= Sanspareil =

Sanspareil Rock Garden
- Felsengarten Sanspareil
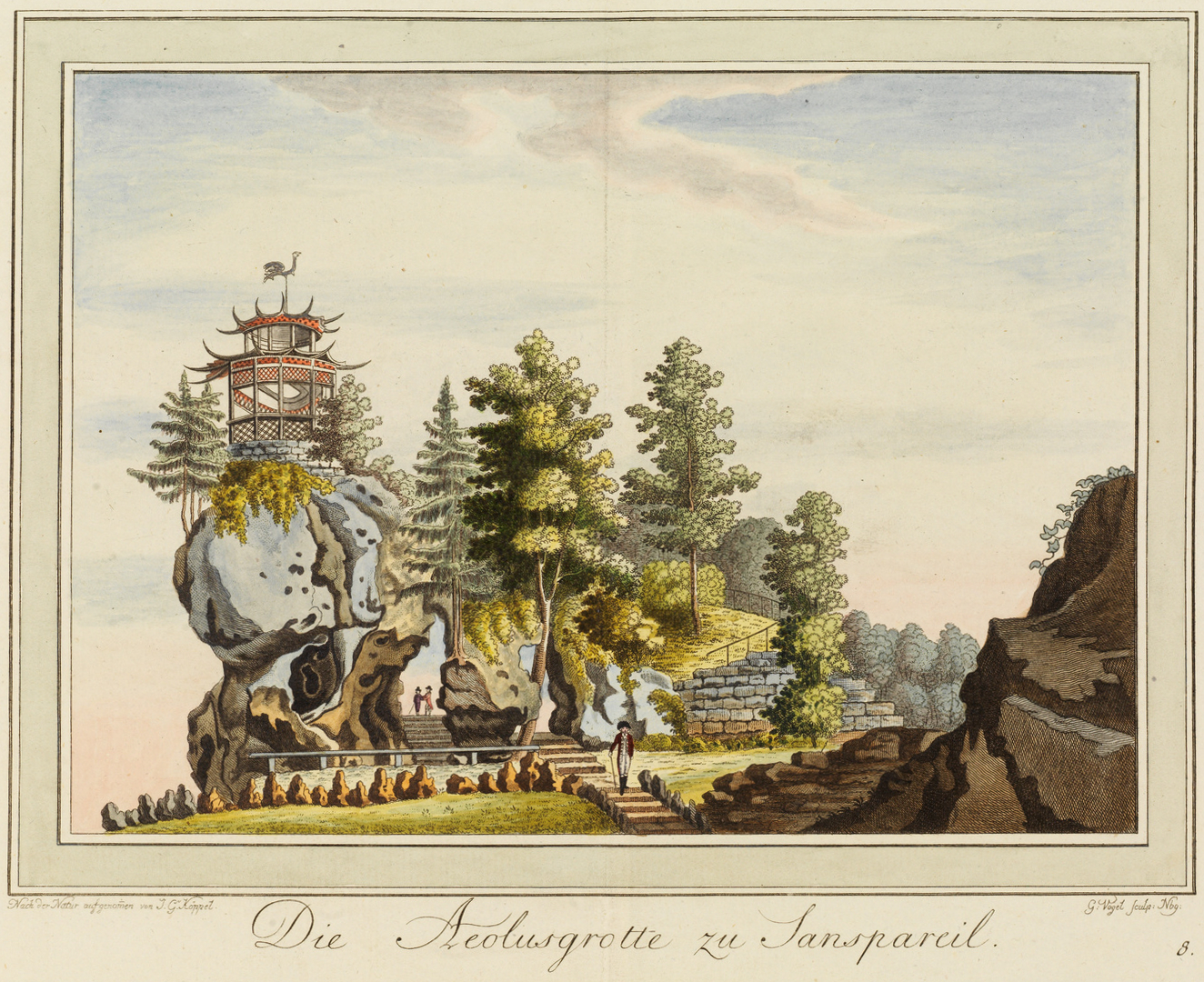
- 1793 illustration of the rock garden
- Location: Sanspareil, Bavaria
- Coordinates: 49°58′59″N 11°19′16″E
- Designer: Joseph Saint-Pierre
- Type: English landscape garden
- Beginning date: 1744
- Completion date: 1748
- Website: Sanspareil Rock Garden

Sanspareil rock garden (French “sans pareil” [sɑ̃paˈʀɛj] meaning 'unparalleled' or 'incomparable') is an English landscape garden created between 1744 and 1748 in the village also now called Sanspareil, pronounced locally in German, or the Ostfränkisch dialect as "Samberell". It is in the municipality of Wonsees in the district of Kulmbach, Bavaria.

The 13-hectare garden incorporates natural rock outcrops of the Franconian Jura and the medieval castle of Zwernitz. Work on it began under Frederick, Margrave of Brandenburg-Bayreuth and was completed by his wife Margravine Wilhelmine. On first seeing the grove with its strange rock formations, one of Frederick's guests is said to have exclaimed 'C'est sans pareil!' – 'It has no equal!'.

The entire ensemble is a protected monument. The garden has been designated Geotope 477R008 by the Bavarian State Office for the Environment.

== Natural setting ==
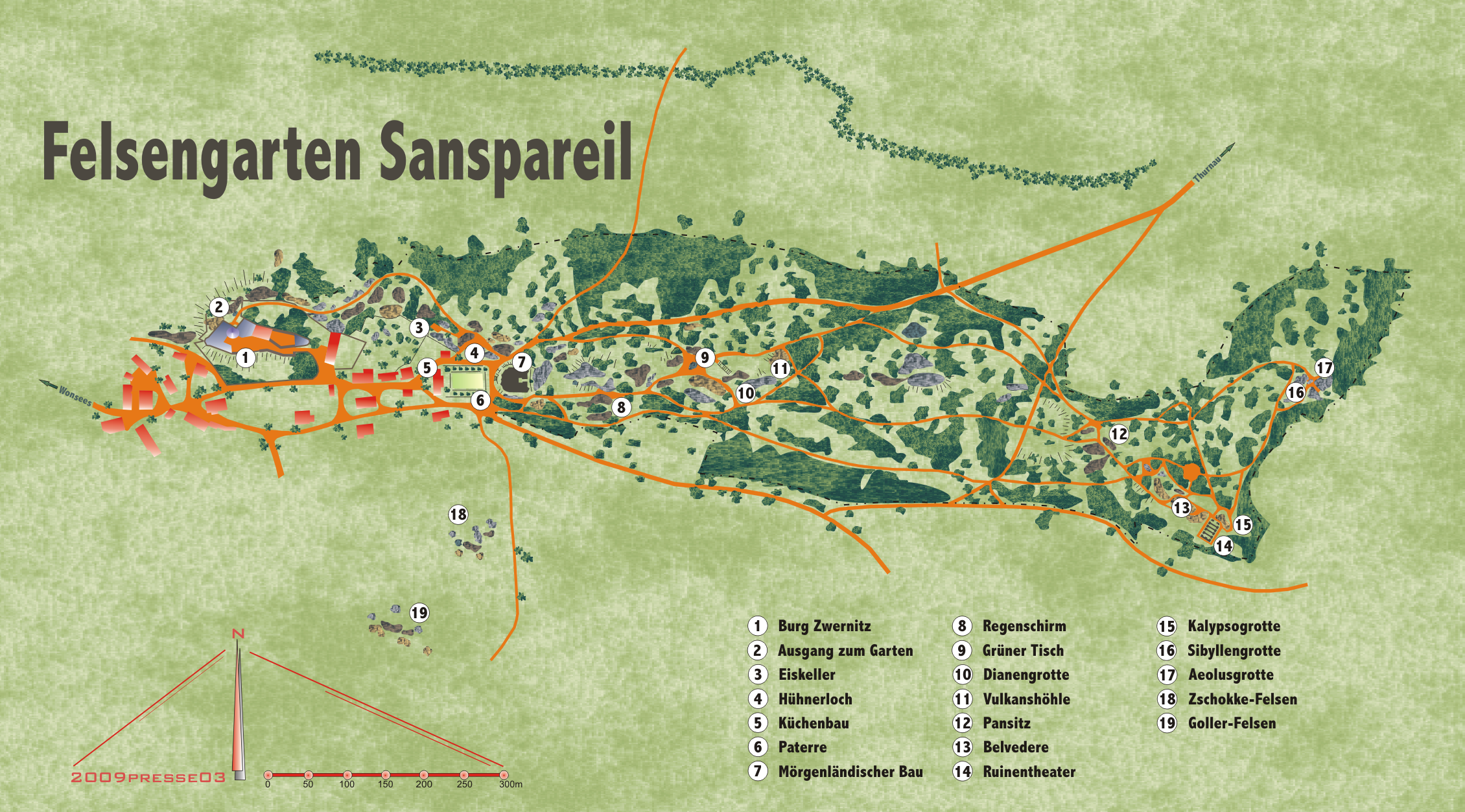
Plan of the Sanspareil gardens

The village now known as Sanspareil was called Zwernitz until 1746, after the castle that stands there. The first mention of the landscape around it was in documents from 1434, which refer to a beech grove below the castle as the “Han zu Zwernitz”. The grove is distinctive because it stands amid numerous formations of limestone rocks, and it is unusual for beech trees to thrive on northern slopes in the arid Franconian Jura. The humanist de:Friedrich Taubmann, born in Wonsees, praised the grove for its beauty and described it in detail in his 1604 work Schediasmata poetica.

Thirty-nine limestone outcrops of different heights and disparate groupings are located in the garden area that is about 800 metres in length, connected by a total of 17.5 kilometers of footpaths. Some of the rocks contain natural grottos or smaller caves, while others are so close together that they only allow crevice-like passages. Most of the rocks served as natural features when the landscape garden was designed in 1744. Some were carved or trimmed and others formed bases for artificial structures, which had all disappeared by the beginning of the twentieth century

The consistent description of the place as a “hain” (“grove”) since the Middle Ages indicates that it has remained largely unchanged for centuries. On the northern edge of the grove there is also a spruce population that appears in old descriptions from the 18th century: "The strongest spruces stood slender and noble in this spruce hall and hardly let the midday sun in." Near the parterre at the entrance grew rowan, chestnut, linden and fruit trees; At Mentor's grotto stood different varieties of willow; the ballroom was surrounded by a double ring of linden and wild chestnut trees, while Calypso's grotto had silver birch, maple, and spruce. Buckthorn bushes crowned the rocky peaks. All of these species occurred naturally in the original landscape, although in some places trees were cleared to afford a distant view of the ornamental buildings, as is seen in engravings of 1748 and 1793.

== Construction ==
In the spring of 1744, on the orders of Margrave Friedrich von Bayreuth, work began in the castle grounds based on plans by the garden architect Joseph Saint-Pierre. In April of the same year, Margravine Wilhelmine moved into Zwernitz Castle. Wilhelmine supervised the further execution of the construction work. She made numerous suggestions, largely to shape the garden around incidents recounted in Fénelon's novel Les Aventures de Télémaque. A German translation had been published in 1733 under the title Die seltsamen Begebenheiten des Telemach and was very popular in court circles at the time.

By the end of 1744, the Speaker's House, (Referentenhaus), the log cabin (Holzstoßhäuschen) and the Belvedere were complete. Construction began the following year on the oriental building, burgrave house, margrave house and kitchen building, with the significant involvement from the court plasterer de:Giovanni Battista Pedrozzi. In 1746 work followed on the ruined theatre, modeled on the ruined theatre at the Eremitage in Bayreuth.

In 1746 the village and the grove at Zwernitz were given the name Sanspareil. Two years later, all work on the garden and on the permanent buildings was completed with the finishing of the stucco work in the hall of the oriental building. Attempts to incorporate water features, considered essential in garden design, were not successful.

In 1748 and 1749 the first publications about the garden of Sanspareil appeared. Also in 1749 Johannes Thomas Köppel published the first series of five engravings with garden motifs. The last Margrave Alexander von Ansbach-Bayreuth had some decorative elements added between 1769 and 1791. J. C. Bechstatt, Princely chief huntsman of Hesse, drew the first complete plan of the entire rock gardens in September 1796. Travel poets such as de:Johann Michael Füssel in 1787 and Johann Heinrich Daniel Zschokke in 1796, praised the garden in their work.

== Chinoiserie and classicism ==
The strange limestone outcrops of Sanspareil served as the ideal backdrop for a gigantic chinoiserie. The way unto the garden is near the oriental building, and most of the individual decorative buildings within it had oriental designs, beginning near the entrance with the Oriental Building. Despite this, the narrative theme of the rock garden drew on Greek mythology, and what might appear to be a thematic dissonance did not prompt any critical comment at the time. The ancient spectacle begins immediately behind the Oriental Building: More than a dozen mythological scenes were carved out of the existing rocks. Following the winding path, the individual stations of the Telemachy are shown.

In Fénelon's pseudo-historical and utopian novel, the young Telemachus and his teacher Mentor proceed through various ancient states in decline because of flattery, war and moral failings. Fénelon shows how, thanks to Mentor's advice, these problems can be solved through peaceful settlements with neighbours and reforms, in particular by promoting agriculture and reducing the production of luxury goods. Margravine Wilhelmine chose to bring this story to life in the design of her landscape garden so that the walker follows a winding course through the natural rock groups from one scene to another. Although today's rock garden has only a few of the features she commissioned, Wilhelmine's iconographic program is still legible.

Wilhelmine's transformation of the Zwernitz's beech grove into the island of Ogygia by giving the landscape a literary program through decorative design was way ahead of its time. Only decades later did it become a common feature in the romantic landscape parks. Her idea of incorporating the medieval Zwernitz Castle into the overall picture as “natural” ruined architecture was only taken up in continental Europe almost a century later.

== Decay and restoration ==
In 1810, the castle and gardens, together with the Margraviate of Bayreuth, became part of the Kingdom of Bavaria. First the decorative features in the rock garden fell into disrepair, then the permanent buildings also began to deteriorate. In 1830, a lightning strike destroyed the temple of Aeolus and King Ludwig I ordered that the gardens be closed. In 1832 the kitchen building, wooden ballroom and what was left of the Temple of Aeolus' metal structures were sold for scrap. In 1835 the Belvedere was demolished due to dilapidation as were, in 1839 the burgrave and margrave houses, the log cabin and the house of Diana. The straw house had already disappeared by that time.

In 1942, the castle and gardens were put under the control of the Bavarian Administration of State-Owned Palaces, Gardens and Lakes, which first restored the gardens and then the oriental building in 1951 and finally opened them to the public in 1956. Two years earlier, Erich Bachmann published the first Official Guide to the Sanspareil Rock Garden, describing it as an example of a distinct type of landscape, the felsengarten (rock garden). This term has been recognized by the specialist literature.

== Natural and decorative elements ==
=== Ice Cellar and Chicken Cave ===
Below the northern flank of Zwernitz Castle, a dark, cellar-like passage emerges from the natural rock, which, coming from the chapel courtyard of the castle, leads through the north-western foothills of the rock garden. A little down the valley from what used to be the outer bailey are two groups of rocks, first the Eiskeller (“ice cellar”), a gorge-like shaft with a cave-like depression, and then the Hühnerloch (“chicken-hole”), a perforated rock through which the footpath used to pass and which now goes around it. Immediately south of the chicken hole the entrance area of the garden begins with the parterre.

=== Parterre ===
Eastwards from the castle the first element in the garden was the parterre, a sunken level area measuring some 20 by 15 metres. The parterre is the only small part of the rock garden laid out geometrically in the then conventional manner of architectural gardens. The inner square, laid out with colored sand and planted with curved box hedges is surrounded by pyramidal trees. Margrave Alexander had flower borders planted in the middle of the parterre only around 1785. This rococo element would have made the contrast with the surrounding landscape garden stand out clearly. Soon after the borders were planted, however, by 1793 the lowered central part with its broderies was filled up to obtain a level lawn. The pyramid trees in pots were also replaced with planted tiered trees. In 1984 the ensemble was reconstructed based on the engraving by J. T. Köppel from 1748. The kitchen building stood on the west side, with the oriental building on the east side. The long sides of the rectangle were flanked the Margrave House and the Burgrave House, both of which disappeared in 1839.

=== Speakers' house ===
The core area of the grove begins immediately behind the oriental building. On the first crest of rock stood the speakers’ house (“Referentenhaus”) a half-timbered building with quarry stone facing that could be heated by an open fireplace. Margrave Friedrich von Bayreuth sometimes did government business here, hence the name.

=== Log cabin ===
On the summit of the highest rock, which was given the romantic name Rock of Love (“Felsen der Liebe”) at the end of the 18th century, between the birches and beeches stood a little house, the outer paneling of which resembled a pile of wood. The log cabin ("Holzstoßhaus"), whose interior walls were decorated with landscapes in a sort of mosaic of moss and colored stones, had a shingle roof.

=== Umbrella and straw house ===
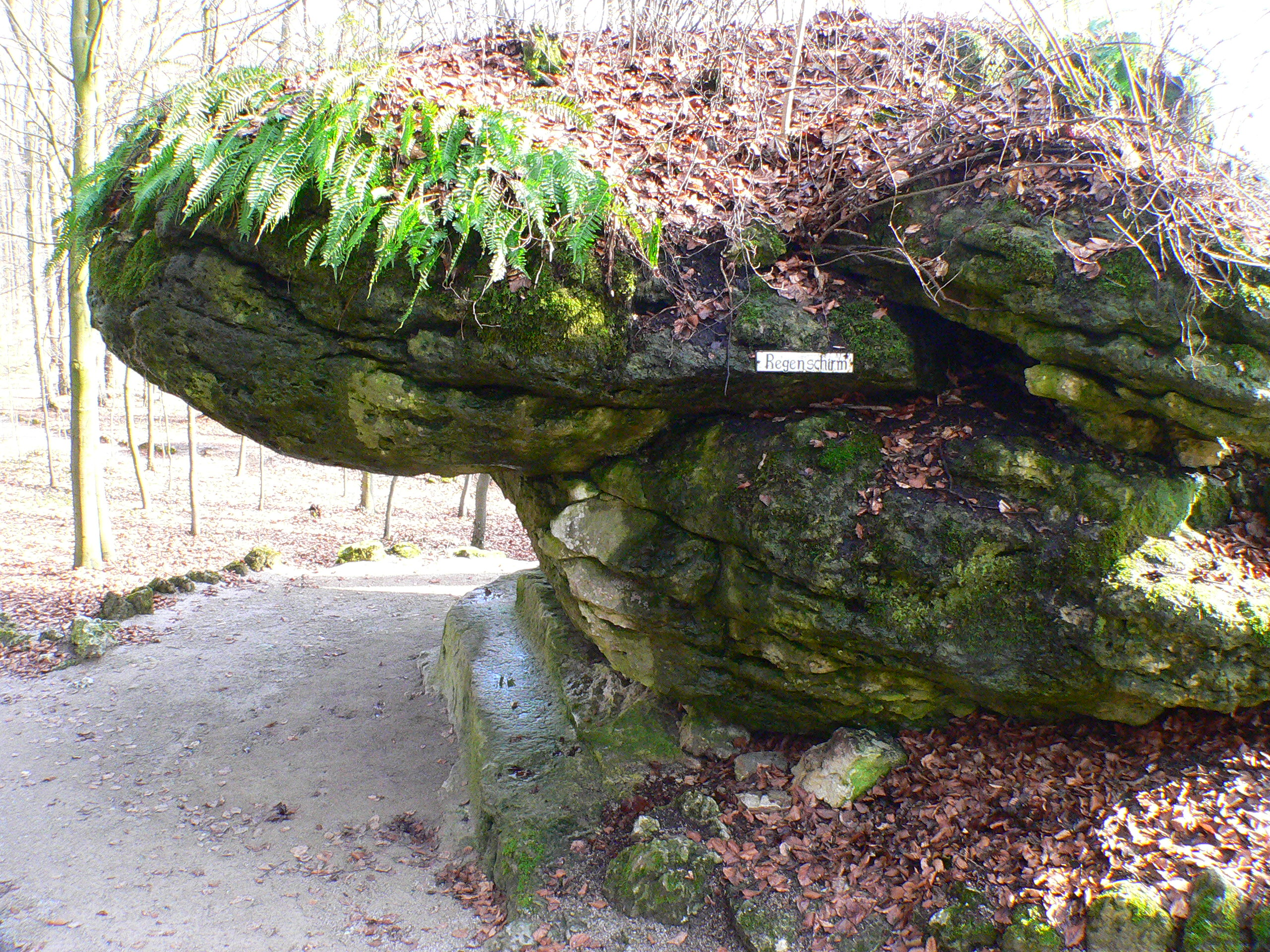
The Umbrella

About 70 meters from the parterre in a south-easterly direction is a widely overhanging rock with a stone bench, the Umbrella (“Regenschirm”). From there a wide meadow stretches out, at the edge of which originally stood the straw house (“Strohhaus”), a half-timbered building clad in bark, whose corners were made of raw tufa stones. An open roof truss with an overhanging thatched roof rested on stripped tree trunks, forming a peristyle-like gallery. The straw house was the favorite residence of Princess Elisabeth Friederike Sophie of Brandenburg-Bayreuth Wilhelmine's daughter.

=== Green Table and Mentor's Grotto ===
Not far to the north-east of the umbrella, eight rocks form a rondel, which is described as the most scenic part of the rock garden: completely surrounded by mountains and rocks, a natural rock theater forms, in which grottos, overhangs and bottlenecks alternate. The strongest overhang is formed by the Mentor's Grotto and in front of it the Green Table (“ Grüner Tisch”), the top of which surrounds a tree trunk like a tree arbor. Mentor's Grotto was the favourite retreat of Margraviate Wilhelmine, who would spend entire days there.

=== Diana’s Grotto ===
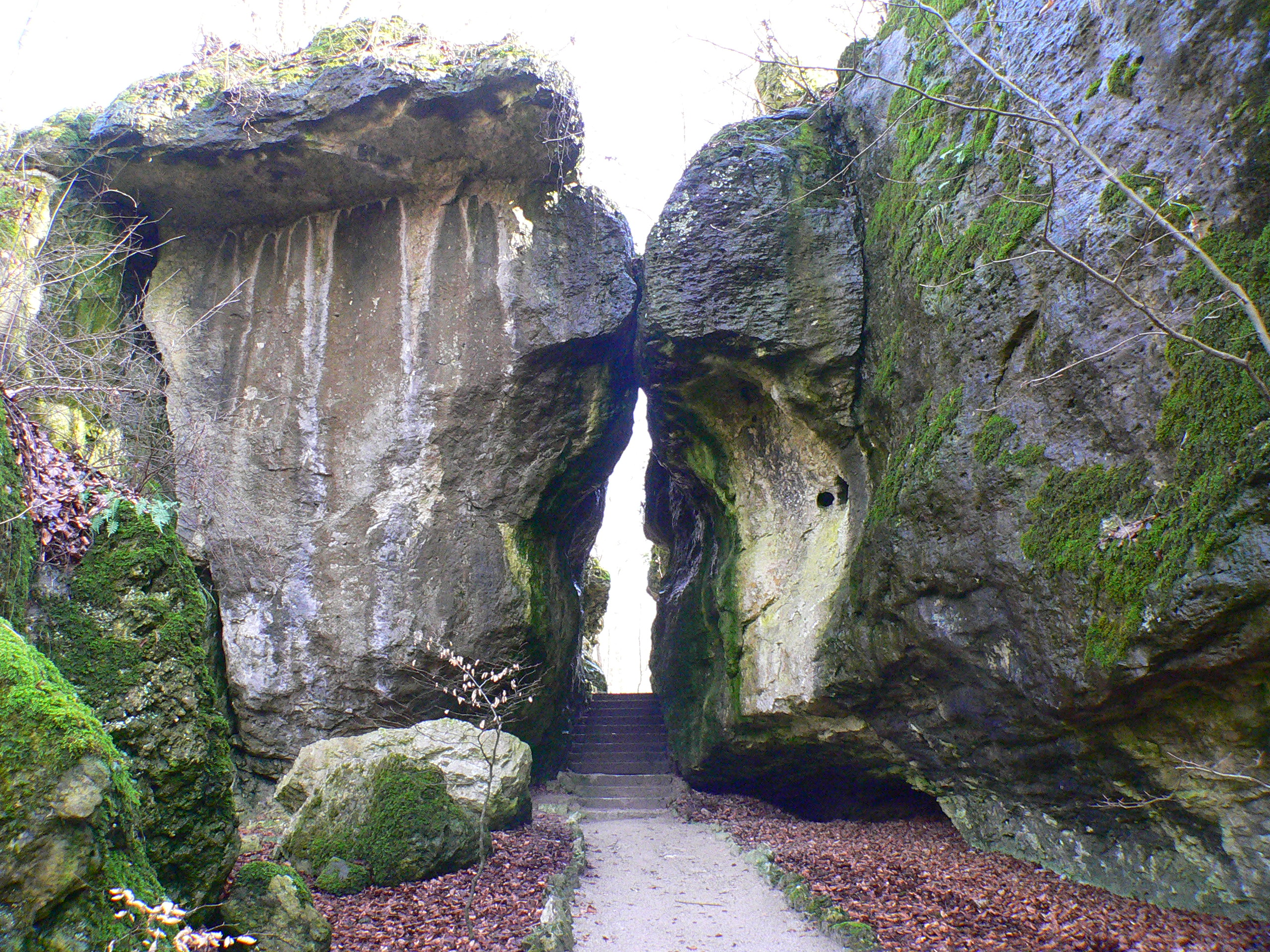
Diana's grotto

Immediately south of the Green Table is a gorge of overhanging rocks that form Diana's Grotto. The grotto was originally decorated with a naturalistic, colorful group of sculptures consisting of the goddess Diana armed with bow and arrows and three nymphs with hunting dogs. On the rock above the grotto stood a shingle-roofed green moss hut, the Dianenhäuschen, another "natural" accessory made of stones and bark clad with tufa.

=== Vulcan's Cave and Bear Hole ===
Also bordering on the rock rondel is Vulcan's cave (“ Vulkanshöhle”) to the east, the largest and most spacious of all grottos in the rock garden. A painting by the Bayreuth court painter Wilhelm Wunder once adorned the back wall of this mighty cave. It showed three cyclops helping Vulcan forge thunderbolts for Zeus. In this group of rocks there is another, smaller cave called the Bear hole (“Bärenloch”). A statue of Penelope originally stood above it.

=== Belvedere ===
The central feature of the mythological scenery around Odysseus and his son Telemachus was on the Belvedere rock. On it, a good 15 meters above the ground, stood the Belvedere, a pleasure house in the form of an octagonal pavilion, framed by two other cylindrical buildings. All were made of half-timbered walls lined with quarry stone, with tinplate roofs.

=== Calypso's Grotto ===
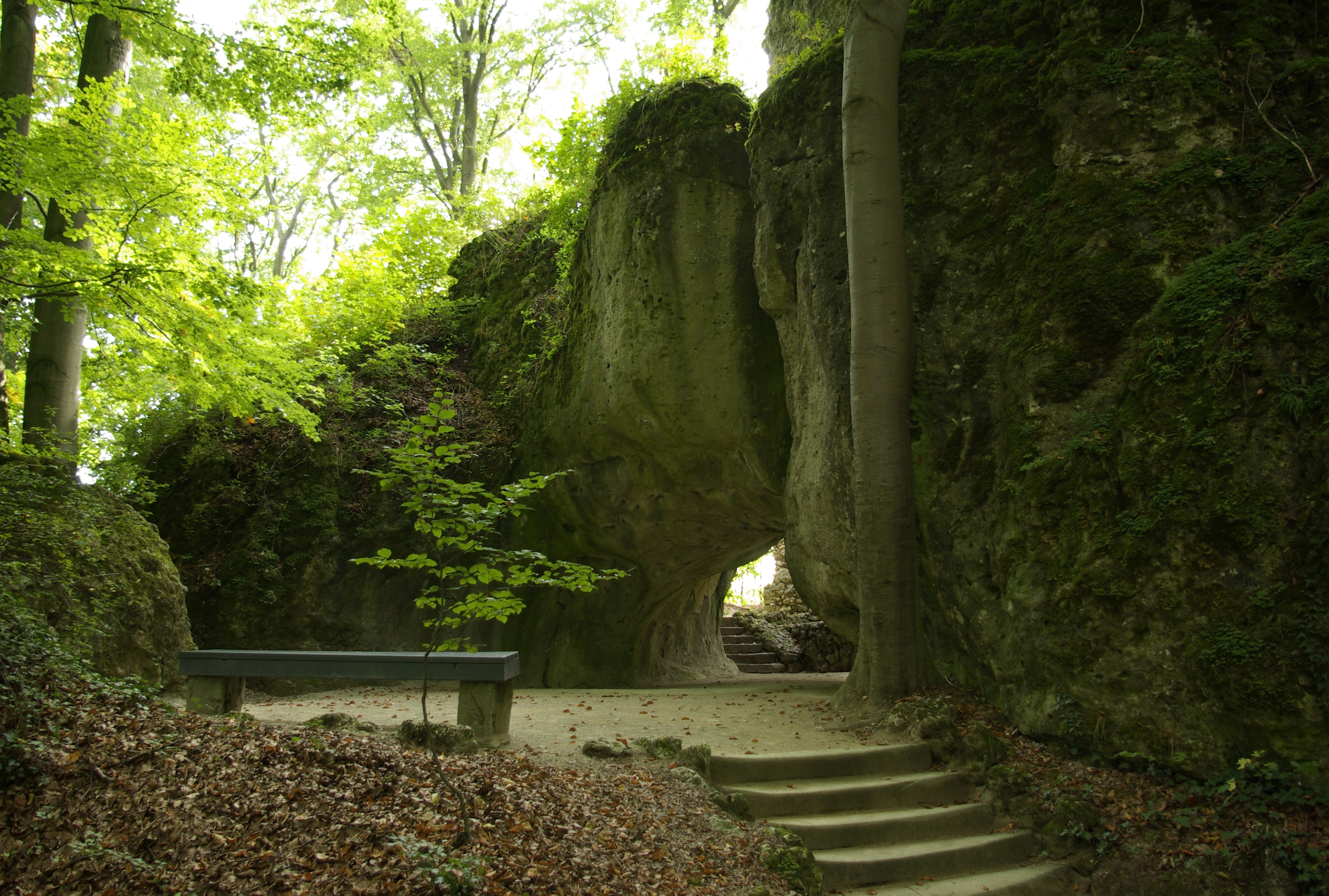
Felsengarten Sanspareil Kalypsogrotte 001

At the foot of the Belvedere rock, next to the small sirens’ grotto, there is the much larger Calypso's grotto and to the south, as the only surviving built element in the garden, the ruin and grotto theater. Contemporary descriptions mention a life-size and colorfully painted group of statues set up in the grotto. It depicted Calypso, being served refreshments by a nymph, with Telemachus kneeling in front of her. Due to its location directly in front of the orchestra pit of the ruin theater and its size, the calypso grotto could be used as a rainproof auditorium.

=== Sibyl’s and Aeolus’ Grotto ===
In Aeolus’ Rock, the easternmost rock in the garden, are Sibyl's and Aeolus’ Grottoes. Originally, statues stood here depicting Sibyl in front of a temple and Telemachus, whose fate was being predicted. Margrave Carl Alexander had the Aeolus temple built on the rock dedicated to the god of the winds. It could only be reached by two rock bridges.

=== Zschokke and Goller Rocks ===
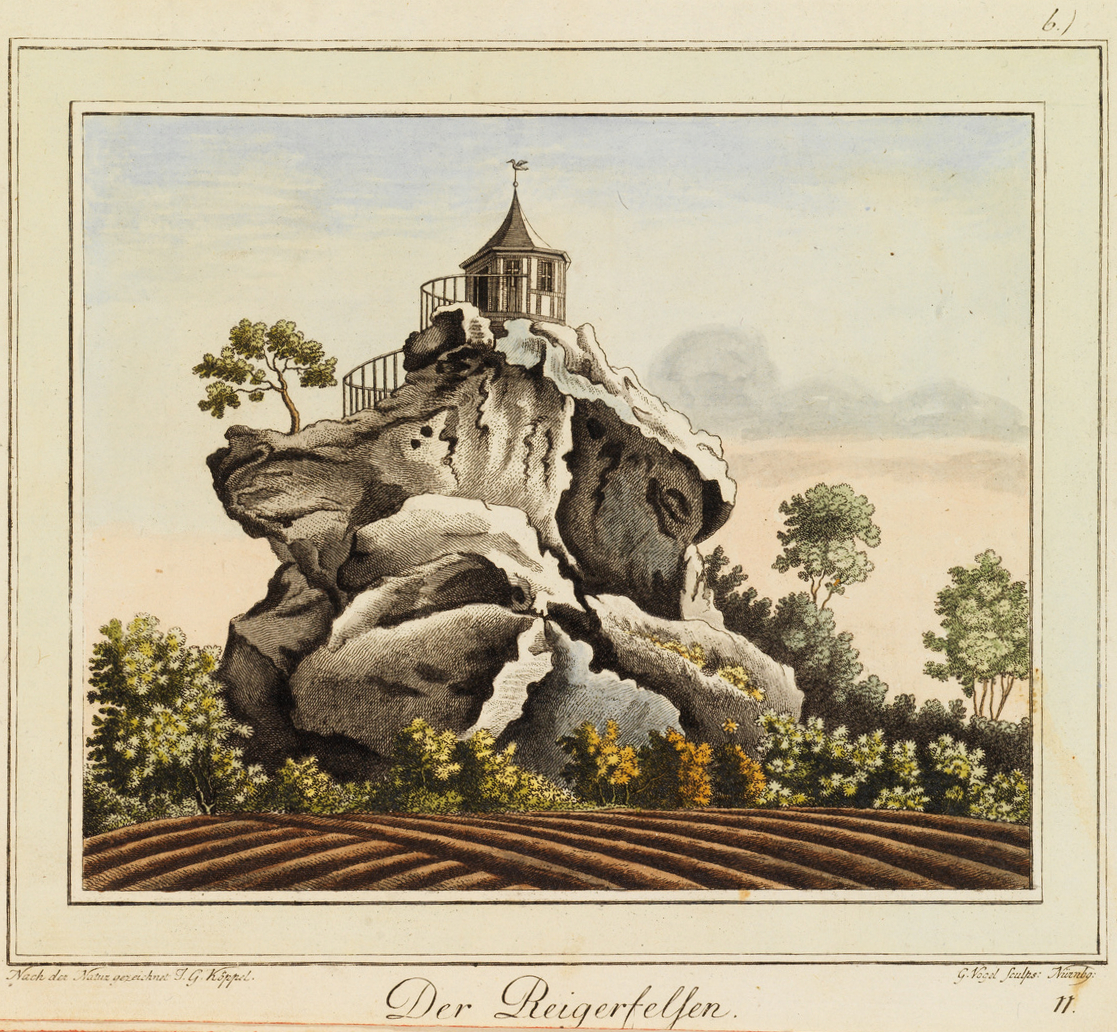
Holler rocks

Well to the south of the parterre and Zwernitz Castle are two groups of rocks in an open field, which were included in the garden as peripheral elements and connected to the grove by paths. The more northern of the two groups contains the mushroom-like Zschokkefelsen (named after the poet Johann Heinrich Daniel Zschokke) and the more southern the Gollerfelsen, also called the Reigerfelsen in the 18th century. Originally it carried a pavilion that was probably built under Margrave Carl Alexander von Bayreuth. In a cave at the foot of the Gollerfelsen stood the life-size, colored statue of a hermit, reading a tract by Paracelsus. Behind the rocks, the rock garden loses itself in the open landscape, as was common everywhere in later classic landscape gardens.

== Surviving buildings ==
=== Zwernitz castle ===
Zwernitz Castle, originally built by Friedrich and Uodalrich de Zvernze in the middle of the 12th century, was destroyed and rebuilt over the course of its history. Its current appearance dates primarily from the 16th and 17th centuries. Only the keep and archive building as well as parts of the curtain walls of the lower and upper castle have medieval origins. As a defensive structure, the castle has been of no importance since the 17th century. By 1793 at the latest, after the outer curtain had been razed, the castle was no more than a scenic element in a landscape.

=== Kitchen building ===
The kitchen building, erected in its original form as a single-storey three-wing complex on the west side of the ground floor opposite the Oriental building, with its partially plastered and fragmented outer walls made of half-timbering or raw stones, represented a mixture of country palace, farmstead and artificial ruin. The three-wing complex opened onto the ground floor, but unusually, its central building had neither windows nor an entrance facing the courtyard. Doors were only on the front sides of the wings. Contrary to all baroque and rococo garden practice, a beech tree was planted right in the main architectural axis in the middle of the small courtyard. This planting is repeated in the inner courtyard of the Oriental Building. The side wings were demolished around 1840 for unknown reasons. In 1983/1984, the remaining building structure was radically redesigned. The goal of setting up a castle café with a serviced terrace led to the opening of the previously closed masonry to the courtyard. Six windows and a central garden portal were added.

=== Oriental building ===
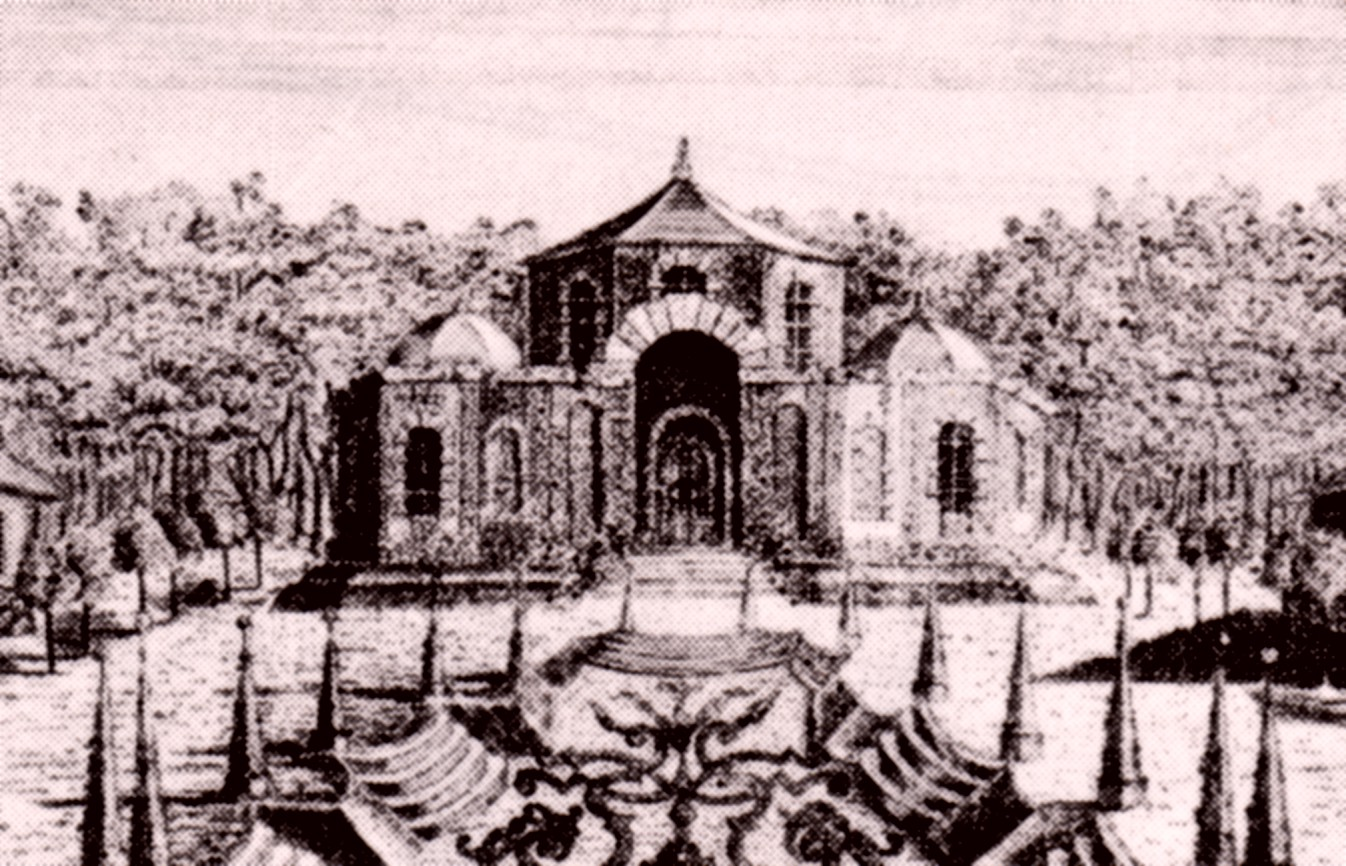
The oriental building in 1748

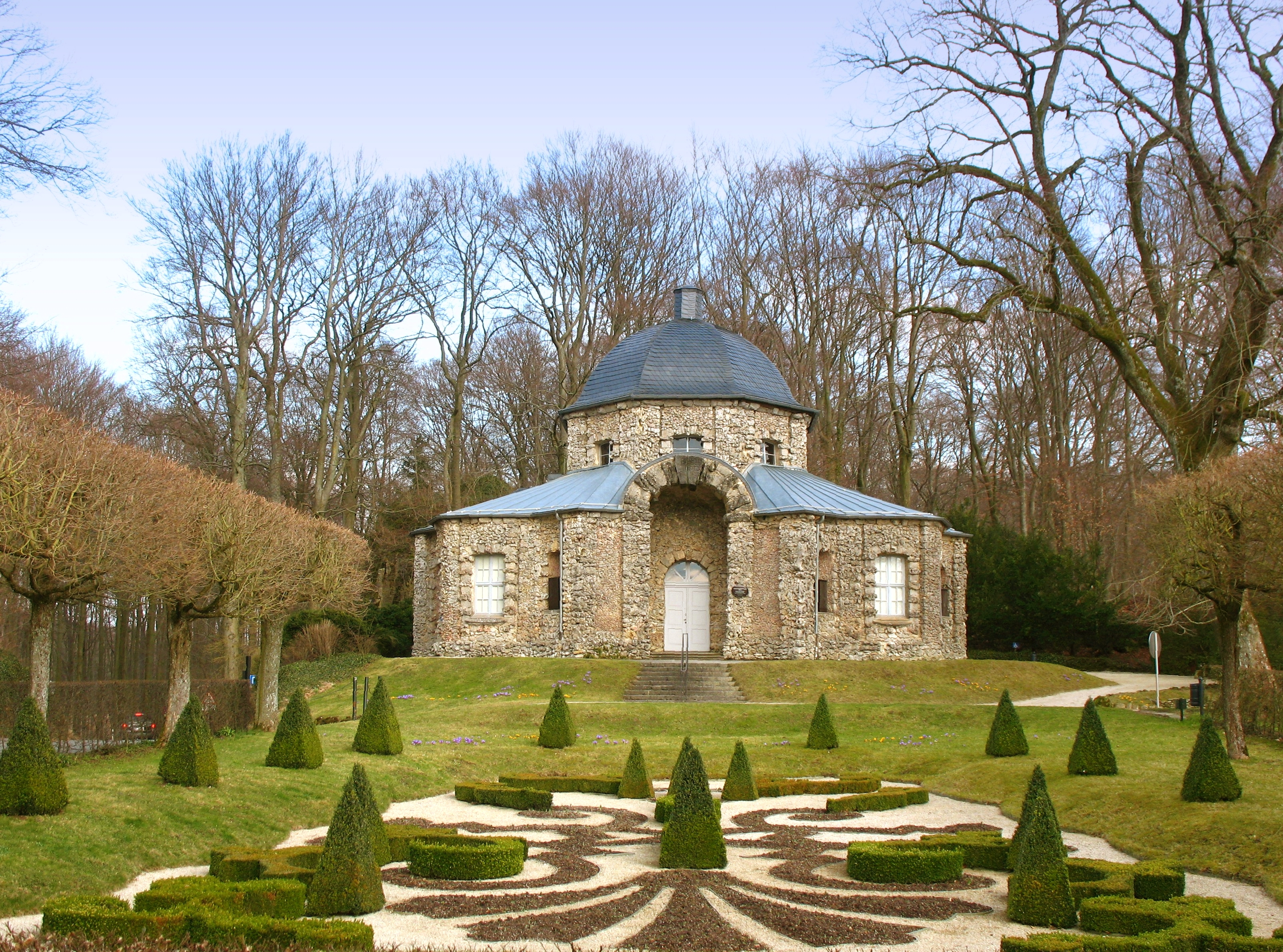
The orientalist building today

The Oriental building, about 50×40 meters in size, was built by Joseph Saint-Pierre in 1746/1747 based on the ideas of Margravine Wilhelmine. The building represents an extraordinary combination of two contrasting building types known in the Baroque and Rococo periods; the floor plan is based on the U-shaped three-wing type with an open courtyard, while the central building type has a dominant middle building. As a result of this mixture, the rooms do not radiate blossom-like from the elevated central building, but rather form a grape-shaped conglomerate along the main axis. The features of the three-wing system are hardly recognizable. The small, open courtyard behind the raised central hall almost closes back onto the rock garden instead of opening up wide towards it, as would have been typical of the time.

The oriental building is also an original architectural representation of the cult of tree arbors, which have been a regular part of German and Swiss garden art since the Middle Ages. The leading French garden theorist of the early 18th century, Dezallier d'Argenville, described them as follows: There are trees in Germany grown in a very ingenious way. Halls are made there, 7–8 feet above the ground, in which the crown of the tree itself forms the roof and the side walls, which are perforated with arcades. The floor is supported by wooden pillars or stone columns. The garden historian Erich Bachmann sees in the oriental building the architectural form of these tree arbours, carried out for the first time in Sanspareil and unique at the time.

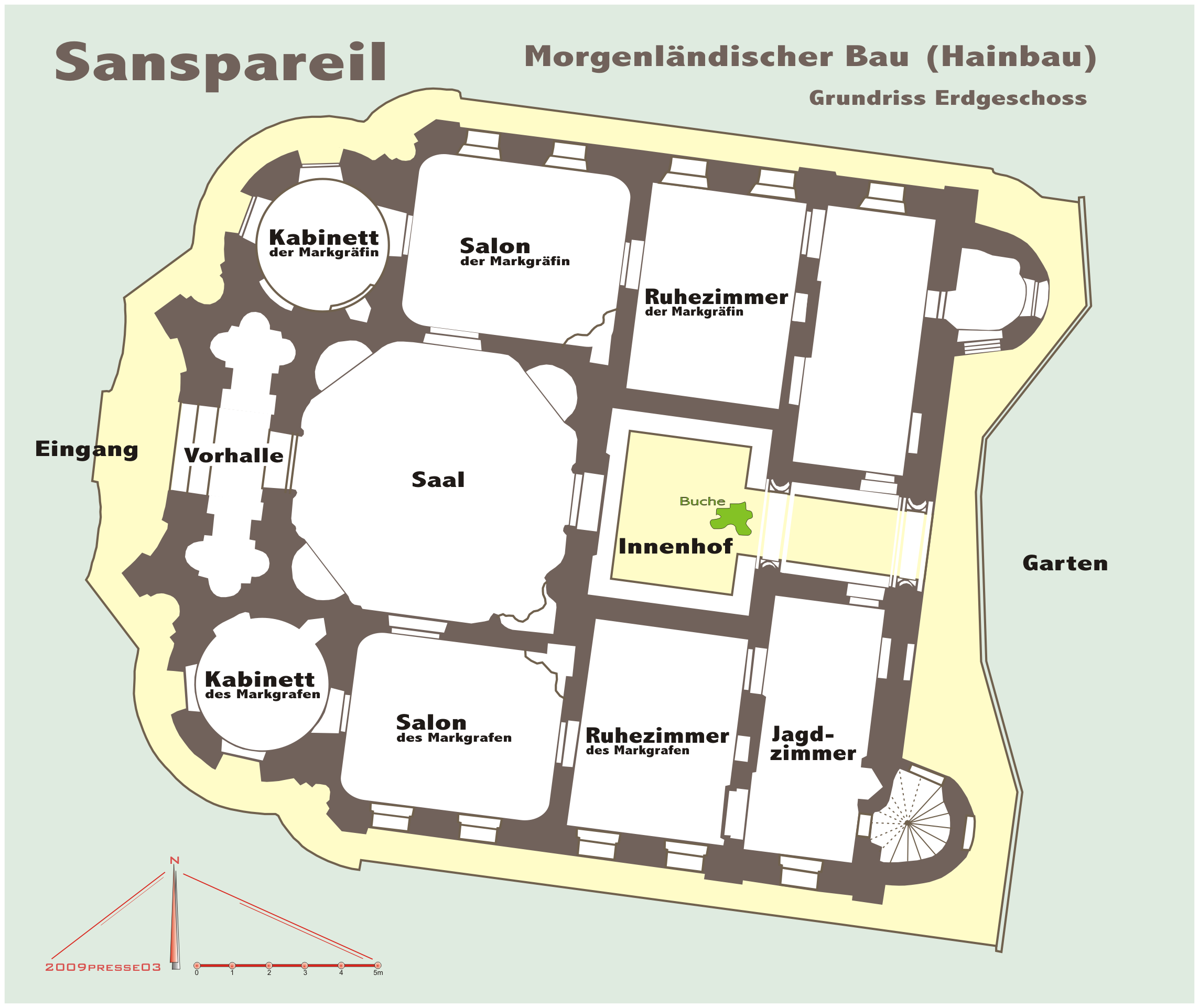
Ground plan of the oriental building

The Margravine preferred labyrinthine, confusing, self-circulating groups of rooms, as her apartments in the New Palace in the Hermitage in Bayreuth testify. This heralded a pre-Romantic rethinking of architecture, which, contrary to the design principles applied until then, now appreciated irregularities and as many broken lines as possible.

The front of the Oriental building was similar to the New Palace later erected at the Hermitage in Bayreuth, with colorful glass rivers, red and blue stones and rock crystals encrusted like a mosaic, although not as consistently as there. This type of decoration was previously only known from the design of grotto-like interiors; its use on exterior facades was a novelty. Especially when the sunlight falls from the side, when the colorful stones and rock crystals begin to glitter, the garden palace appears to the viewer like a foreign palace made of ice and crystal. The castle's original roof shapes also reinforced this impression. The high central building had a flat tent roof and hoods clipped over the flanking cabinets. Everything together gave a Byzantine-oriental impression, reflected in its name.

After 1835, like all the other accessories and buildings in the rock garden, the Oriental Building also fell into disrepair. Almost all of the "Oriental" features of the little garden palace disappeared during the renovations of the 1950s. When it reopened in 1956, it was known as the “Hainbau”, but the name did not catch on.

=== Ruined Theater ===
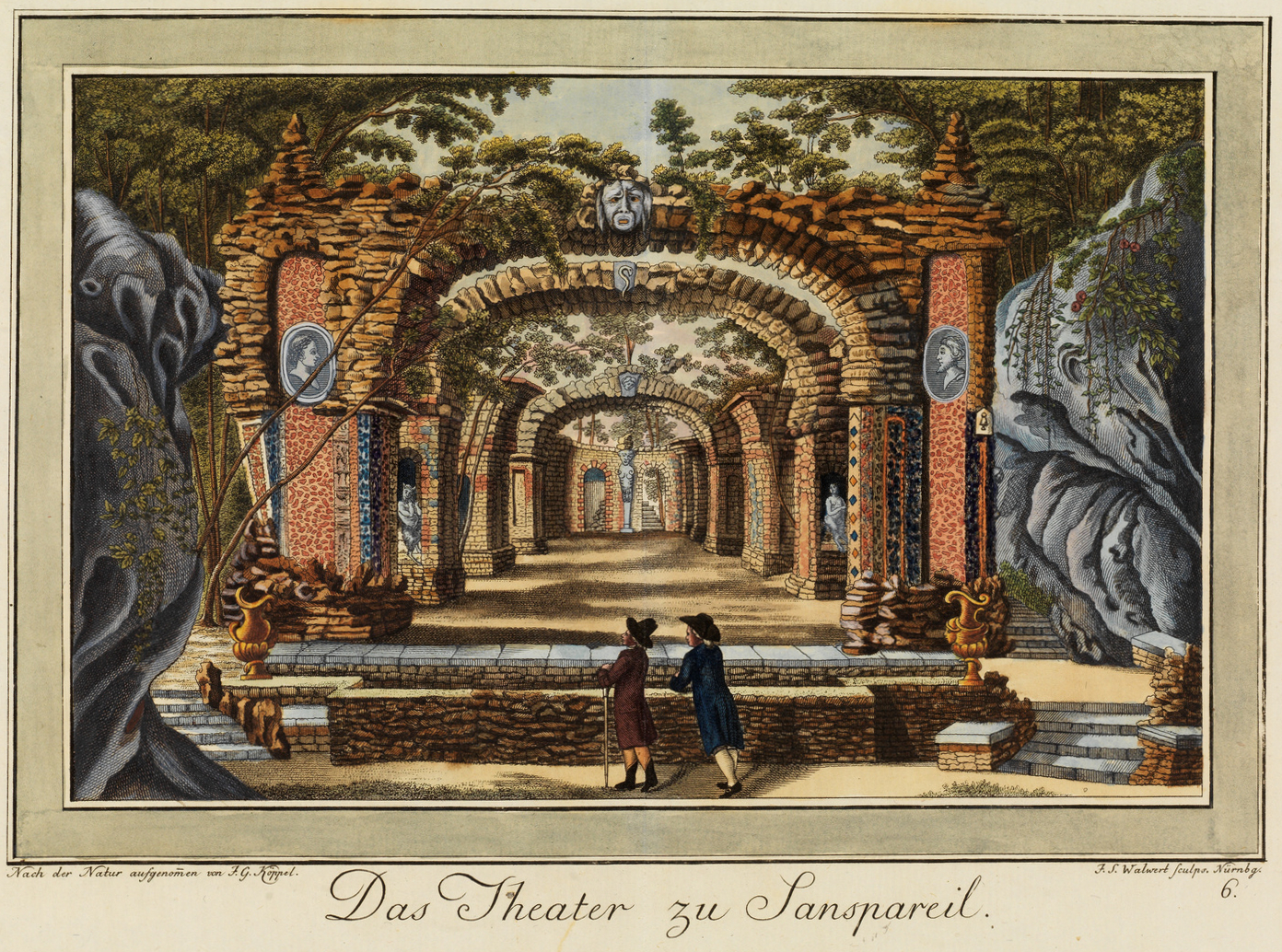
The ruined theatre in the 18th century

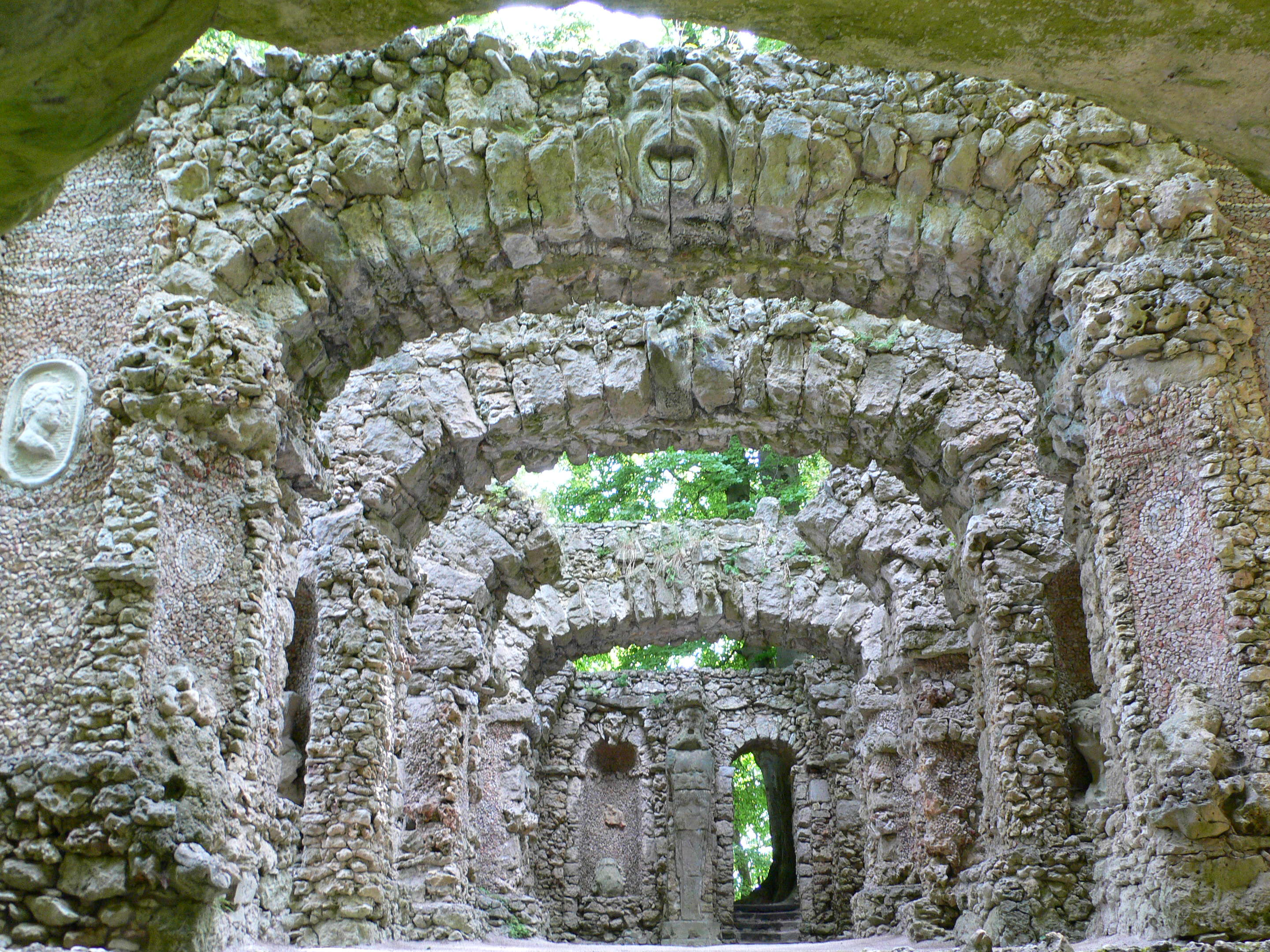
Stage ruined theatre today

The ruined theatre in the south-eastern part of the garden is the only feature that has survived almost intact since its construction in 1744. Joseph Saint-Pierre took as his model the ruin theater in the Hermitage in Bayreuth, which he had also built a year earlier. He also drew inspiration from the only other previous example of a rock theatre, the stone theatre on the Hellbrunner Berg near Salzburg, created between 1610 and 1620.

Whereas in the Bayreuth Hermitage theatre only the stage prospect had the form of an artificial ruin, in Sanspareil the auditorium itself also becomes a scene. As in Salzburg-Hellbrunn, it is located under a large natural rock bridge and, like there, the surrounding rocks are part of the theatrical setting. In addition to the historicizing element of the artificial ruins, there was also the naturalistic-mythical aspect, expressed by statuary. The statues of two satyrs crouched at the base of the frieze, seemed to grow out of the rock. Above them on pilasters were set two oval bust reliefs with idealised portraits of Homer and Virgil. The pilasters merged into cornucopias, between which protruded the keystone in the form of the head of Medusa. While the apex of the second arch displayed the mask of tragedy, the third arch was left unfinished in order to reinforce the character of the ruins. Two more arches follow, the last of which forms the back wall of the stage as a fragment, from which a short staircase leads to the outside. The central column of the back wall is a herm with the bust of Terminus. The height and width of the five arches decreases towards the back wall in order to make the stage appear deeper. There is a walled orchestra pit in front of the stage.

Garden and open-air theaters, also with grottos and ancient ruins, have been known since the 16th century. What is new about the rock theaters in Bayreuth and particularly pronounced in Sanspareil is the lack of the separation between the previously independent elements of scenery and decorative setting.

It is not documented whether there were performances in the Sanspareil rock theater before 1980, but the orchestra pit and audience cave indicate that they were at least planned. The scenery naturally limited the choice of topics, and stood in contrast to the usual baroque and rococo theaters with their fantastic backdrops, special effects and artifice. Since 1985, the de:Studiobühne Bayreuth has regularly performed pieces from its current program in the ruins and grotto theater during the summer months. There are also occasional concerts in the theatre.
