= Harsdorf (disambiguation) =

Harsdorf is a municipality in Germany.

Harsdorf is also a surname. Notable people with the surname include:

- James Harsdorf (born 1950), American politician
- Sheila Harsdorf (born 1956), American politician

== See also ==
- Caspar Frederik Harsdorff (1735–1799), Danish architect
