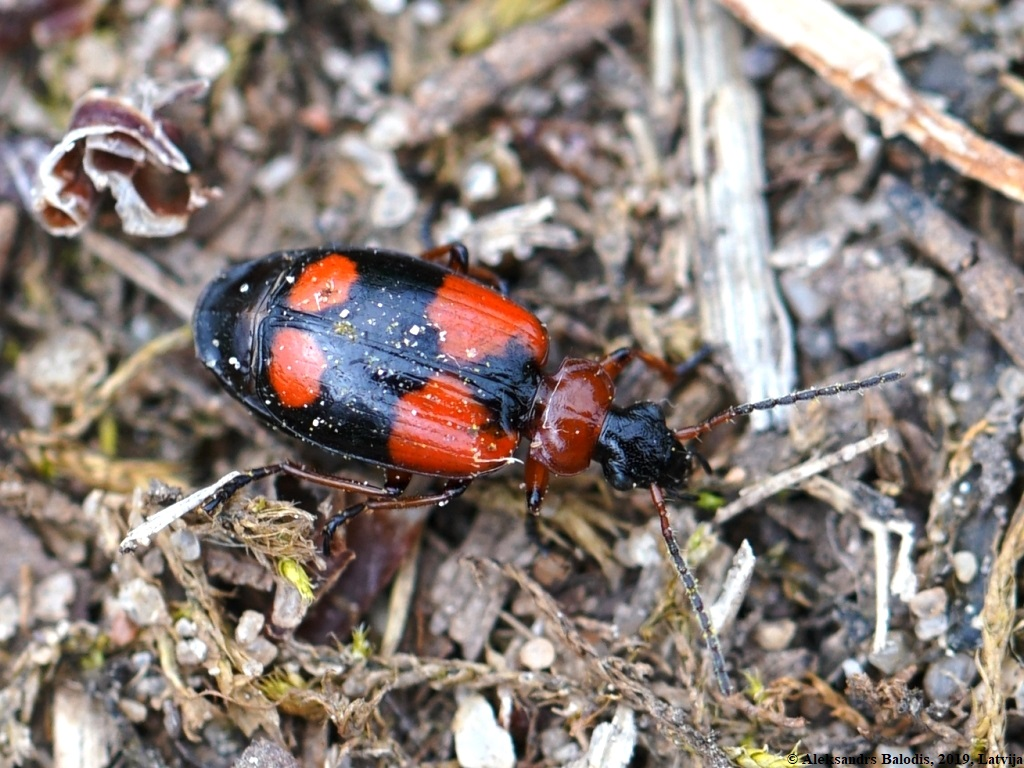
- Lebia cruxminor

Scientific classification
- Kingdom: Animalia
- Phylum: Arthropoda
- Clade: Pancrustacea
- Class: Insecta
- Order: Coleoptera
- Suborder: Adephaga
- Superfamily: Caraboidea
- Family: Carabidae
- Subfamily: Lebiinae
- Tribe: Lebiini
- Genus: Lebia
- Species: L. cruxminor

Binomial name
- Lebia cruxminor (Linnaeus, 1758)

Synonyms
- Carabus cruxminor Linnaeus, 1758; Lebia nigripes Dejean, 1825

= Lebia cruxminor =

Species of beetle

Lebia cruxminor is a species of ground beetle in the Harpalinae subfamily.

== Description ==
Adult beetles length is 6 millimetres (0.24 in). Their color is orange and black. They were first photographed on 30 March 2002, by a Russian entomologist Oleg Berlov, in Irkutsk, Russia.

== Distribution ==
Eurasia, North Africa. The species can be found in Irkutsk, Russia, and various German towns such as: Kulbach district of Bavaria, and Upper Franconia.
