= Mainleus =

- Municipality
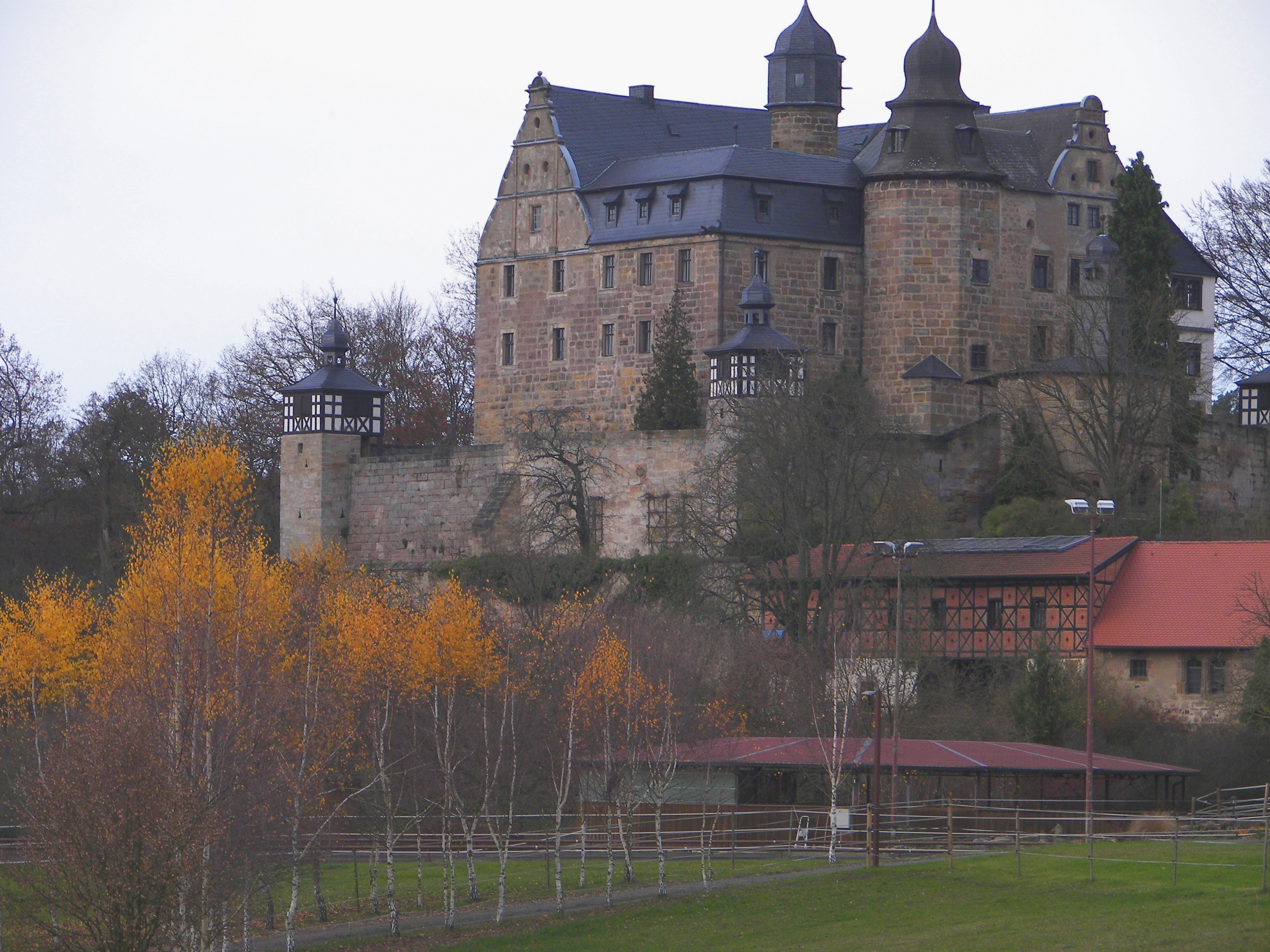
- Wernstein Castle

- Coat of arms

- Location of Mainleus within Kulmbach district
- Interactive map of Mainleus
- Location within Germany Location within Bavaria
- Coordinates: 50°06′00″N 11°22′45″E
- Country: Germany
- State: Bavaria
- Admin. region: Oberfranken
- District: Kulmbach
- Subdivisions: 42

Government
  - Mayor (2020–26): Robert Bosch (CSU)

Area
  - Total: 49.41 km^{2} (19.08 sq mi)
- Elevation: 306 m (1,004 ft)

Population (2025-12-31)
  - Total: 6,378
  - Density: 129.1/km^{2} (334.3/sq mi)
- Time zone: UTC+01:00 (CET)
  - Summer (DST): UTC+02:00 (CEST)
- Postal codes: 95336
- Dialling codes: 09229
- Vehicle registration: KU
- Website: www.mainleus.de

Mainleus is a municipality in the district of Kulmbach in Bavaria in Germany, the site of a post World War II American sector displaced person camp.

== Town administrative division ==
Mainleus is arranged in the following boroughs:

- Heinersreuth
- Wolpersreuth
- Bechtelsreuth
- Krötennest
- Wüstenbuchau
- Buchau
- Wernstein
- Willmersreuth
- Dörfles
- Motschenbach
- Pöhl
- Wüstendorf
- Veitlahm
- Proß
- Eichberg
- Fassoldshof
- Rothwind
- Schwarzholz
- Danndorf
- Schimmendorf
- Schwarzach-Schmeilsdorf.

== Commerce ==
Mainleus is home to Arno Friedrichs Hartmetall GMBH, a leading global manufacturer of tungsten carbide coolant-hole rod blanks for industrial tooling. They are part of the Ohio-based Hyperion Materials & Technologies group.

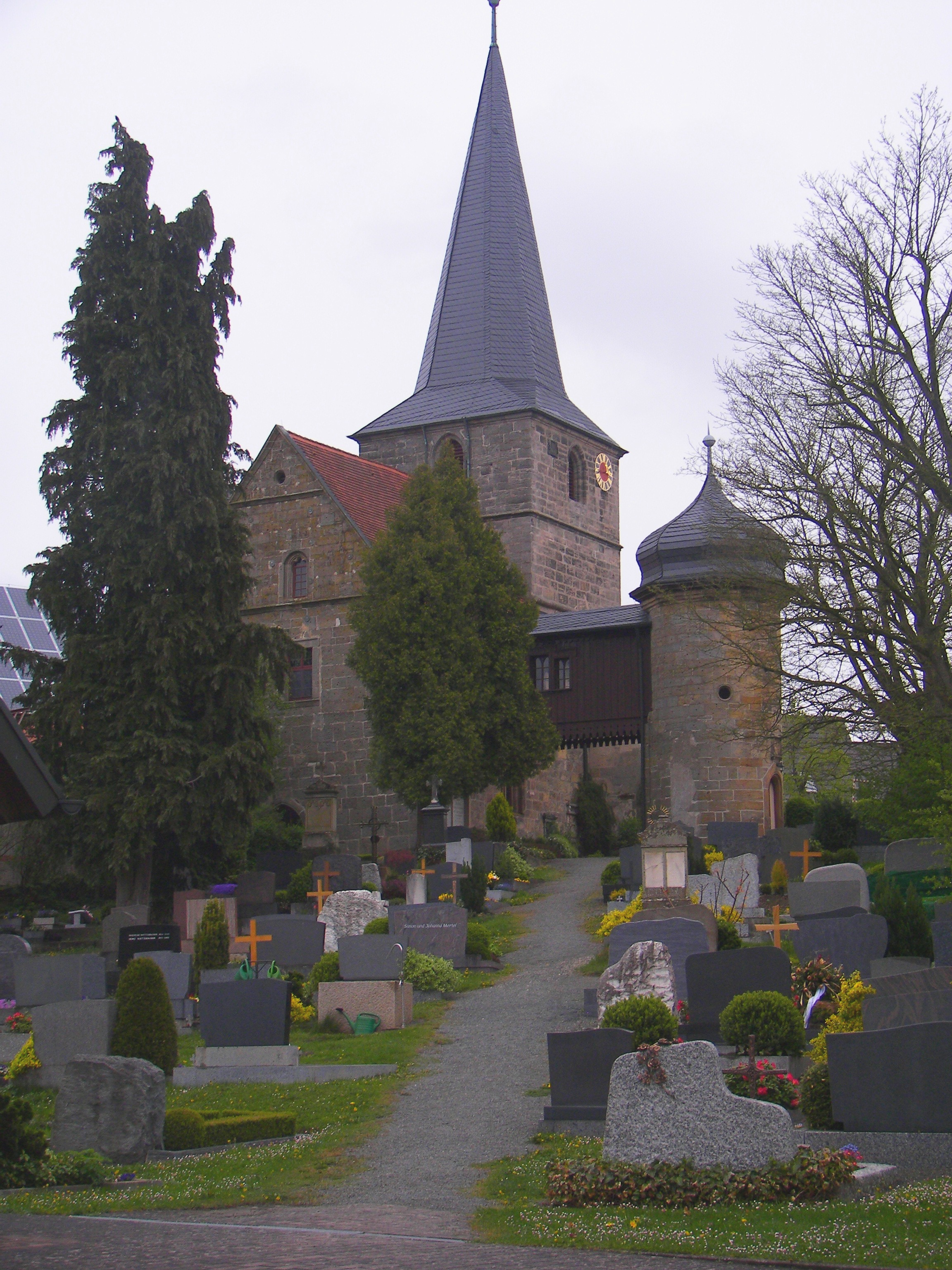
Church and cemetery of Veitlahm

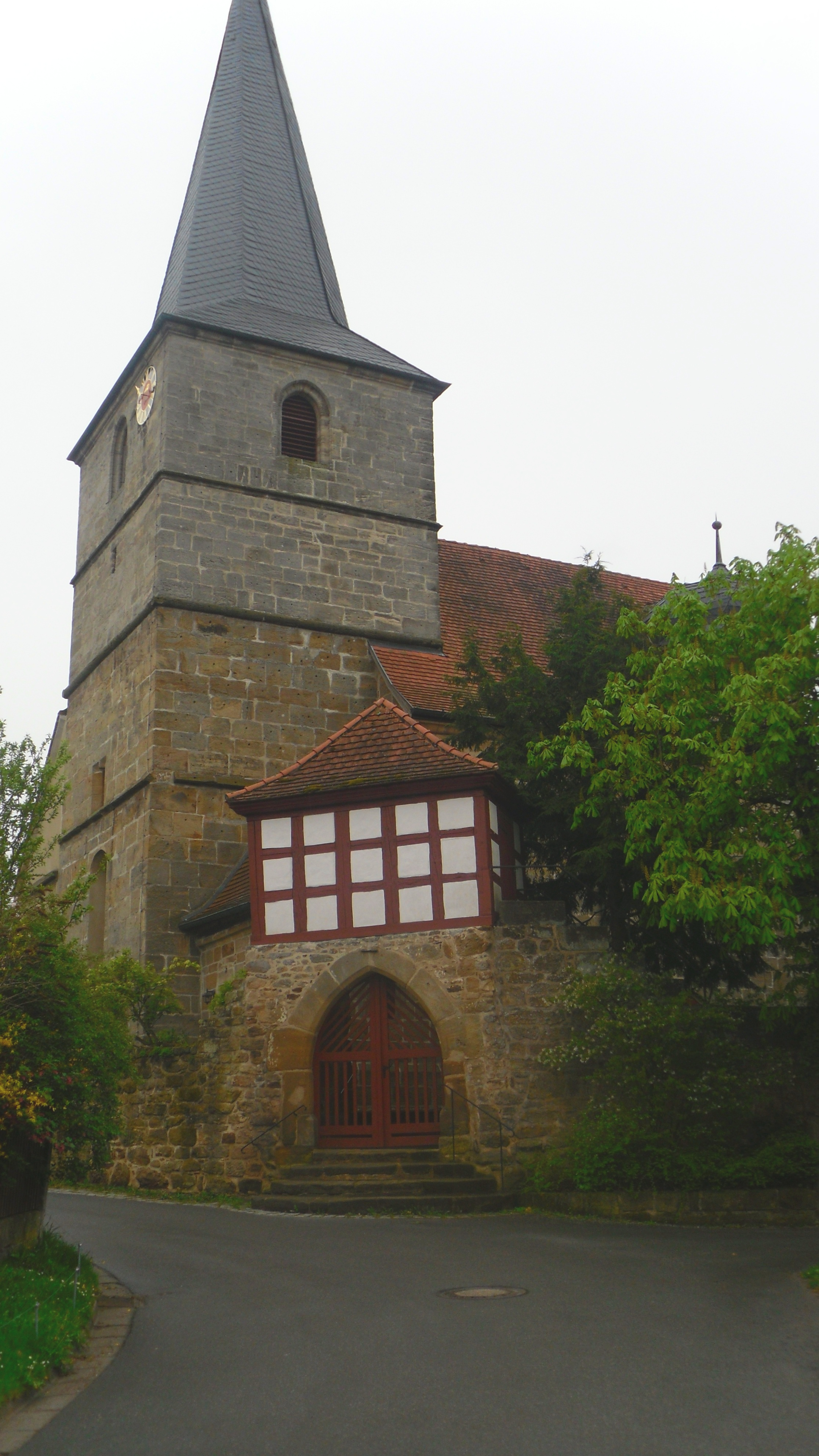
Church of Veitlahm
