= Wonsees =

- Municipality
- Coat of arms

- Location of Wonsees within Kulmbach district
- Interactive map of Wonsees
- Location within Germany Location within Bavaria
- Coordinates: 49°58′N 11°18′E
- Country: Germany
- State: Bavaria
- Admin. region: Oberfranken
- District: Kulmbach
- Municipal assoc.: Kasendorf
- Subdivisions: 10 Ortsteile

Government
  - Mayor (2020–26): Andreas Pöhner

Area
  - Total: 36.78 km^{2} (14.20 sq mi)
- Elevation: 431 m (1,414 ft)

Population (2025-12-31)
  - Total: 1,128
  - Density: 30.67/km^{2} (79.43/sq mi)
- Time zone: UTC+01:00 (CET)
  - Summer (DST): UTC+02:00 (CEST)
- Postal codes: 96197
- Dialling codes: 09274
- Vehicle registration: KU
- Website: www.wonsees.de

Wonsees is a municipality in the district of Kulmbach in Bavaria in Germany.

== City arrangement ==
Wonsees is arranged in the following boroughs:

- Feulersdorf
- Gelbsreuth
- Großenhül
- Kleinhül
- Lindenmühle
- Plötzmühle
- Sanspareil
- Schirradorf
- Wonsees
- Zedersitz
