= Kasendorf (Verwaltungsgemeinschaft) =

- Verwaltungsgemeinschaft
- Location of Kasendorf within Kulmbach district
- Interactive map of Kasendorf
- Location within Germany Location within Bavaria
- Coordinates: 50°02′N 11°21′E
- Country: Germany
- State: Bavaria
- Admin. region: Upper Franconia
- District: Kulmbach
- Seat: Kasendorf
- Subdivisions: 2 municipalities

Area
  - Total: 75.79 km^{2} (29.26 sq mi)

Population (2025-12-31)
  - Total: 3,508
  - Density: 46.29/km^{2} (119.9/sq mi)
- Time zone: UTC+01:00 (CET)
  - Summer (DST): UTC+02:00 (CEST)
- Website: www.kasendorf.de

Kasendorf is a Verwaltungsgemeinschaft (municipal association) in the district of Kulmbach in Bavaria, Germany. Its seat is in Kasendorf.

It consists of the following municipalities:

1. Kasendorf
2. Wonsees
