= Kasendorf =

- Municipality
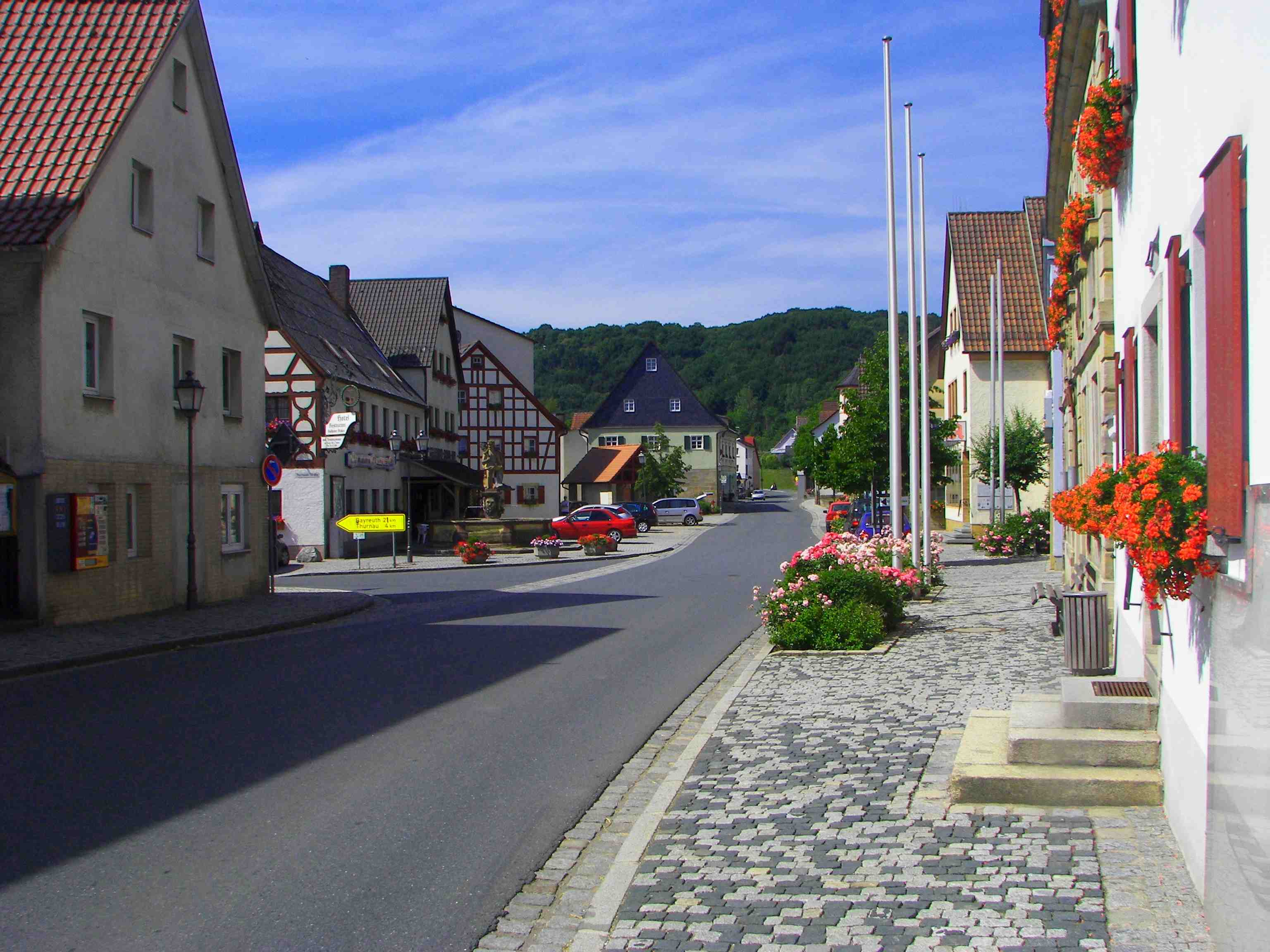
- Main street in the village

- Coat of arms

- Location of Kasendorf within Kulmbach district
- Interactive map of Kasendorf
- Location within Germany Location within Bavaria
- Coordinates: 50°1′N 11°20′E
- Country: Germany
- State: Bavaria
- Admin. region: Oberfranken
- District: Kulmbach
- Municipal assoc.: Kasendorf

Government
  - Mayor (2020–26): Norbert Groß (CSU)

Area
  - Total: 39.01 km^{2} (15.06 sq mi)
- Elevation: 380 m (1,250 ft)

Population (2025-12-31)
  - Total: 2,380
  - Density: 61.0/km^{2} (158/sq mi)
- Time zone: UTC+01:00 (CET)
  - Summer (DST): UTC+02:00 (CEST)
- Postal codes: 95359
- Dialling codes: 09228
- Vehicle registration: KU
- Website: www.kasendorf.de

Kasendorf is a municipality in the district of Kulmbach in Bavaria in Germany.

== Municipal division ==
Kasendorf is arranged in the following boroughs:

- Azendorf
- Döllnitz
- Heubsch
- Kasendorf
- Krumme Fohre
- Lindenberg
- Lopp
- Neudorf
- Peesten
- Reuth
- Welschenkahl
- Zultenberg
