= Marktleugast (Verwaltungsgemeinschaft) =

- Verwaltungsgemeinschaft
- Location of Marktleugast within Kulmbach district
- Interactive map of Marktleugast
- Location within Germany Location within Bavaria
- Coordinates: 50°11′N 11°38′E
- Country: Germany
- State: Bavaria
- Admin. region: Upper Franconia
- District: Kulmbach
- Seat: Marktleugast
- Subdivisions: 2 municipalities

Area
  - Total: 54.68 km^{2} (21.11 sq mi)

Population (2025-12-31)
  - Total: 3,786
  - Density: 69.24/km^{2} (179.3/sq mi)
- Time zone: UTC+01:00 (CET)
  - Summer (DST): UTC+02:00 (CEST)
- Website: www.marktleugast.de

Marktleugast is a Verwaltungsgemeinschaft (municipal association) in the district of Kulmbach in Bavaria, Germany. Its seat is in Marktleugast.

It consists of the following municipalities:

1. Grafengehaig
2. Marktleugast
