= Trebgast =

- Municipality
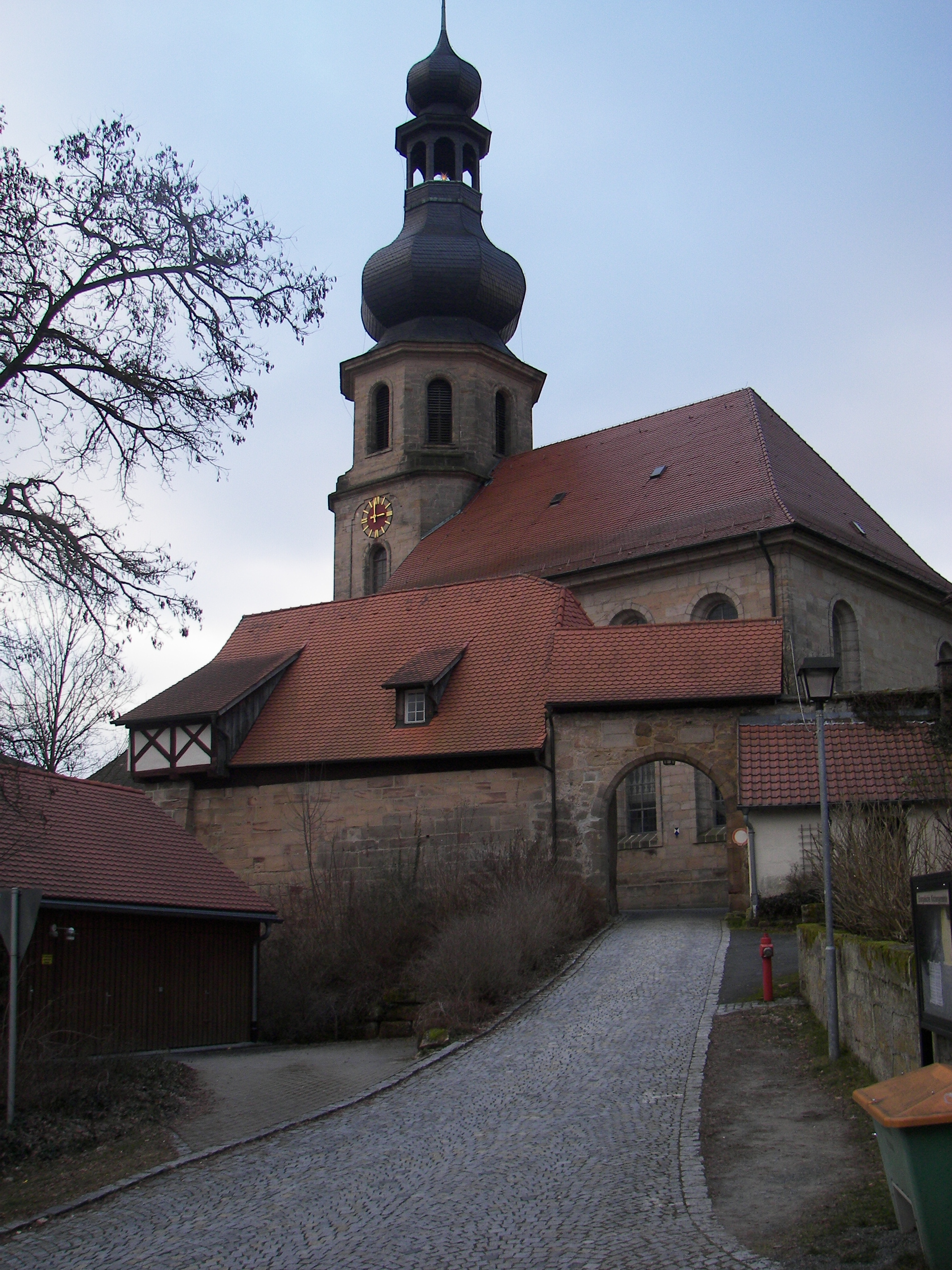
- Church of Saint John

- Coat of arms

- Location of Trebgast within Kulmbach district
- Interactive map of Trebgast
- Location within Germany Location within Bavaria
- Coordinates: 50°4′N 11°33′E
- Country: Germany
- State: Bavaria
- Admin. region: Oberfranken
- District: Kulmbach
- Municipal assoc.: Trebgast
- Subdivisions: 4 Ortsteile

Government
  - Mayor (2020–26): Herwig Neumann

Area
  - Total: 17.08 km^{2} (6.59 sq mi)
- Elevation: 361 m (1,184 ft)

Population (2025-12-31)
  - Total: 1,513
  - Density: 88.58/km^{2} (229.4/sq mi)
- Time zone: UTC+01:00 (CET)
  - Summer (DST): UTC+02:00 (CEST)
- Postal codes: 95367
- Dialling codes: 09227
- Vehicle registration: KU
- Website: www.trebgast.de

Trebgast is a municipality in the district of Kulmbach in Upper Franconia in Bavaria, Germany.

== Municipal divisions ==
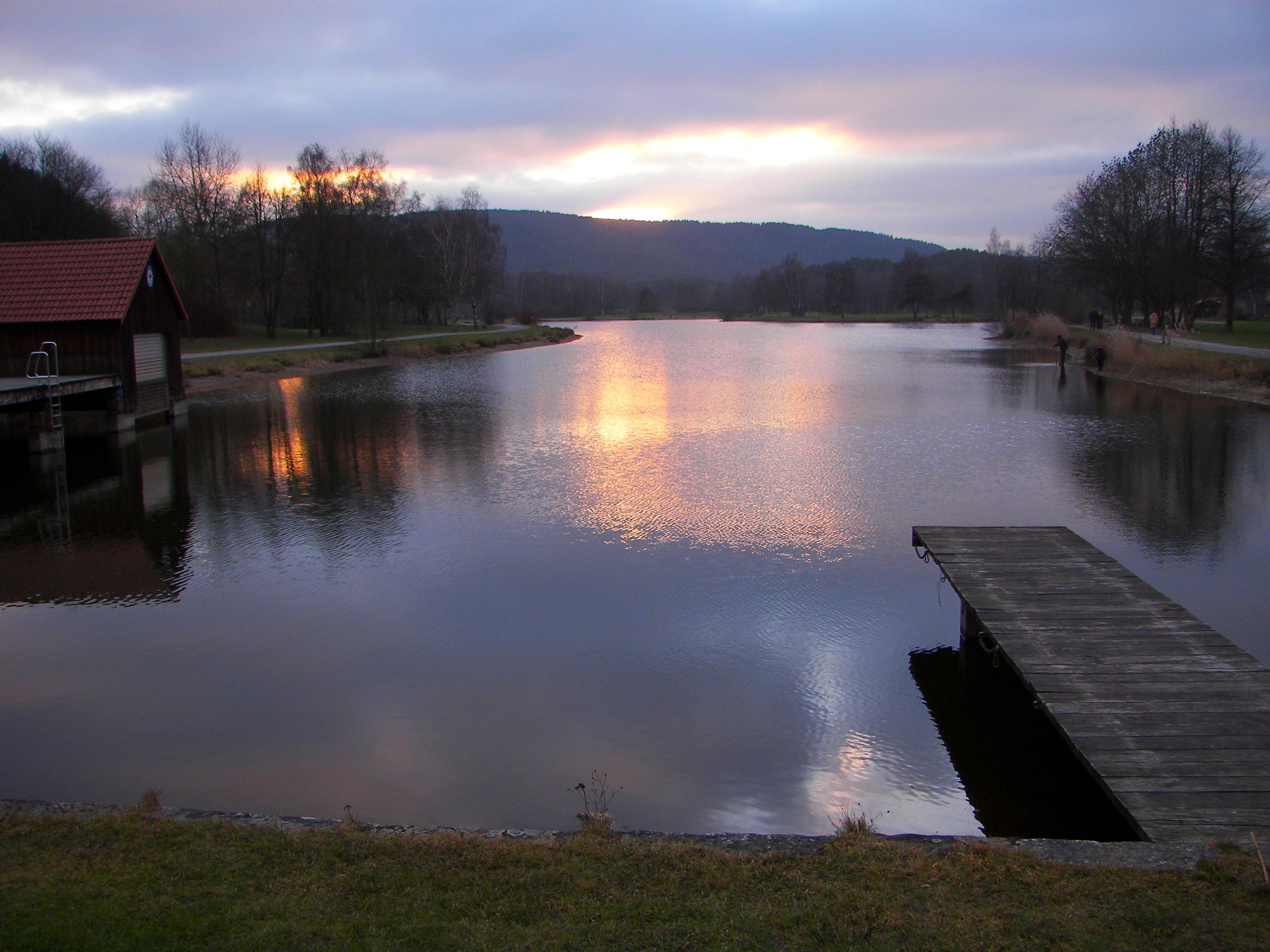
Swimming pond of Trebgast in winter

Trebgast is arranged in the following boroughs:

- Feuln
- Lindau
- Trebgast
- Waizendorf
