= Rugendorf =

- Municipality
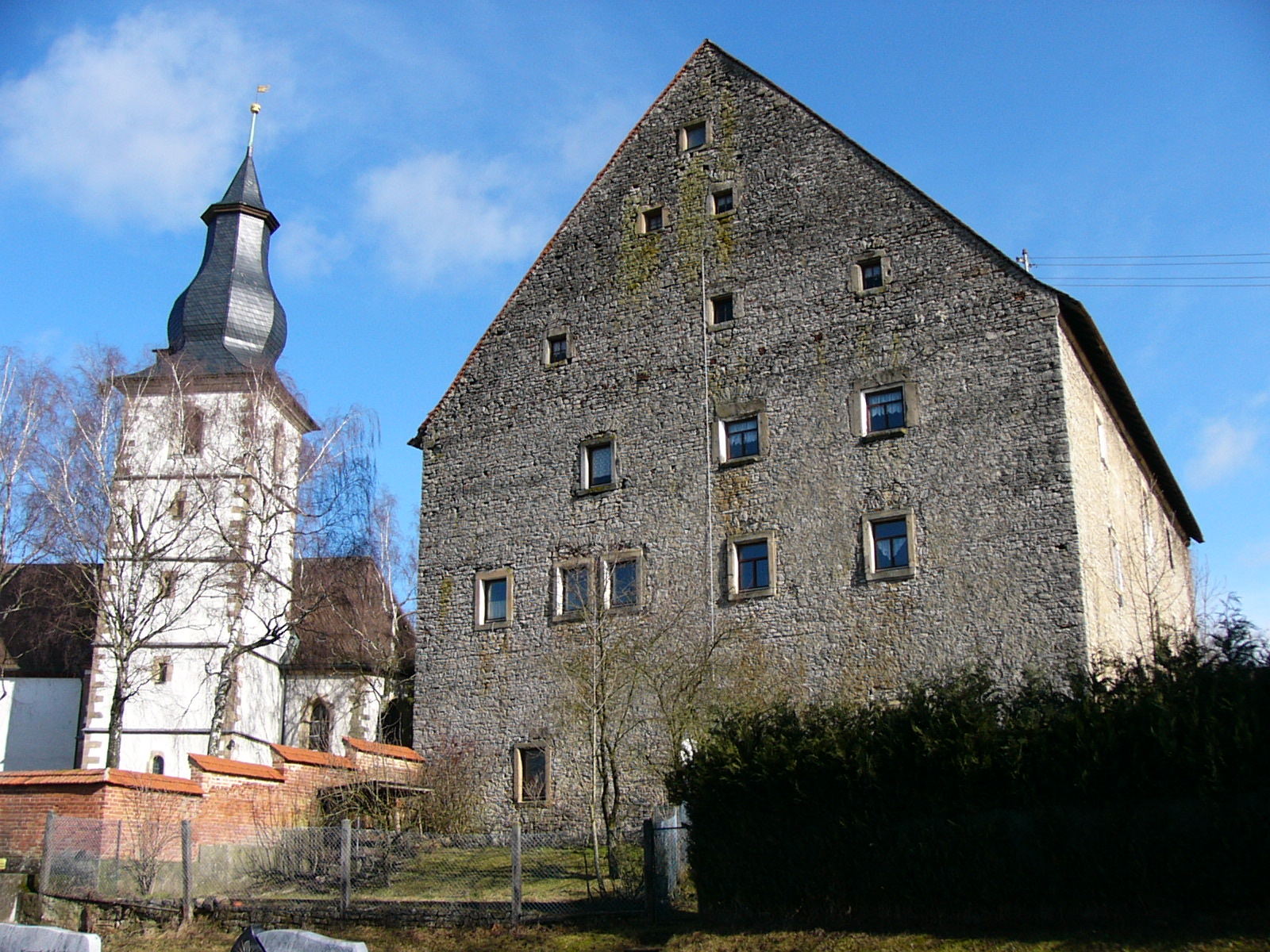
- Lutheran Church of Saints Erhard and James the Elder and the castle

- Coat of arms

- Location of Rugendorf within Kulmbach district
- Interactive map of Rugendorf
- Location within Germany Location within Bavaria
- Coordinates: 50°12′N 11°28′E
- Country: Germany
- State: Bavaria
- Admin. region: Oberfranken
- District: Kulmbach
- Municipal assoc.: Stadtsteinach
- Subdivisions: 7 Ortsteile

Government
  - Mayor (2020–26): Gerhard Theuer

Area
  - Total: 17.32 km^{2} (6.69 sq mi)
- Elevation: 404 m (1,325 ft)

Population (2025-12-31)
  - Total: 929
  - Density: 53.6/km^{2} (139/sq mi)
- Time zone: UTC+01:00 (CET)
  - Summer (DST): UTC+02:00 (CEST)
- Postal codes: 95365
- Dialling codes: 09223
- Vehicle registration: KU
- Website: www.rugendorf.de

Rugendorf is a municipality in the district of Kulmbach in Bavaria in Germany.

== Municipal division ==
Rugendorf is arranged in the following boroughs:

- Eisenwind
- Feldbuch
- Kübelhof
- Losau

- Poppenholz
- Rugendorf
- Zettlitz
