= Jörg Dittwar =

German footballer

Personal information
- Date of birth: 1 August 1963 (age 63)
- Place of birth: Stadtsteinach, West Germany
- Height: 1.81 m (5 ft 11 in)
- Position: Midfielder

Youth career
- TSV Stadtsteinach

Senior career*
| Years | Team | Apps | (Gls) |
| 1980–1986 | SpVgg Bayreuth | | |
| 1987–1994 | 1. FC Nürnberg | 150 | (12) |
- * Club domestic league appearances and goals

Jörg Dittwar (born 1 August 1963) is a retired German football player.

Dittwar was born in Stadtsteinach, Bavaria. In March 2009, he became the coach of the Germany national football team for people with intellectual disabilities.
