= Les Aventures de Télémaque =

1699 novel by François Fénelon

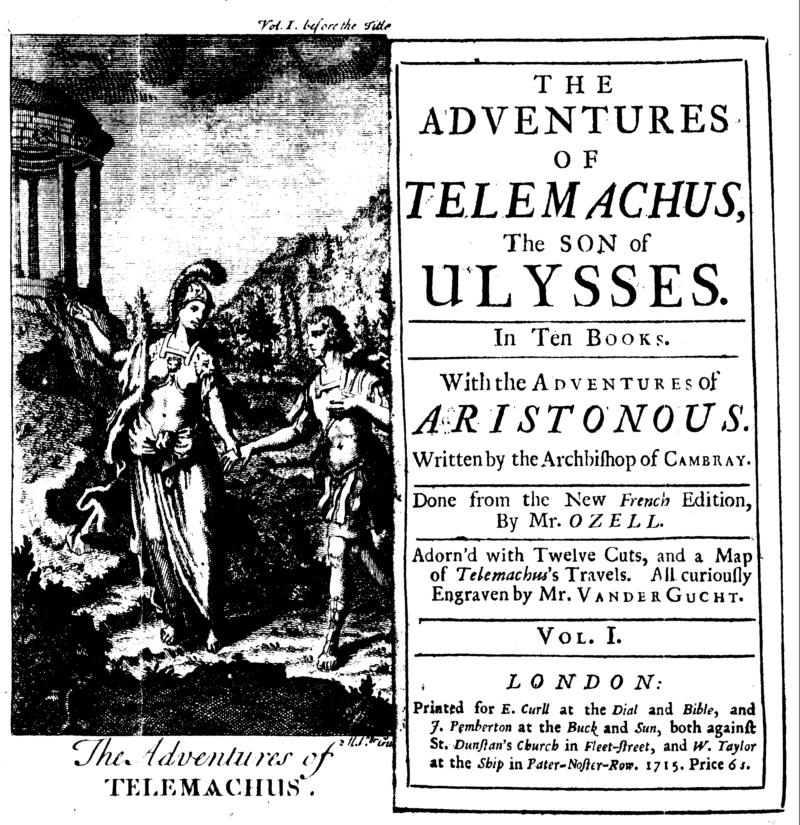
- Frontispiece and title page of a 1715 English translation
- Author: François Fénelon
- Language: French
- Genre: Didactic novel
- Publication place: France

"Les Aventures de Télémaque" is also the title of a 1922 seven-chapter story by Louis Aragon.

Les Aventures de Télémaque, fils d'Ulysse (English: The Adventures of Telemachus, son of Ulysses) is a didactic novel by François Fénelon, Archbishop of Cambrai, who in 1689 became tutor to the seven-year-old Duc de Bourgogne (grandson of Louis XIV and second in line to the French throne). It was published anonymously in 1699 and reissued in 1717 by his family. The slender plot fills out a gap in Homer's Odyssey, recounting the educational travels of Telemachus, son of Ulysses, accompanied by his tutor, Mentor, who is revealed early on in the story to be Minerva, goddess of wisdom, in disguise.

== Themes ==
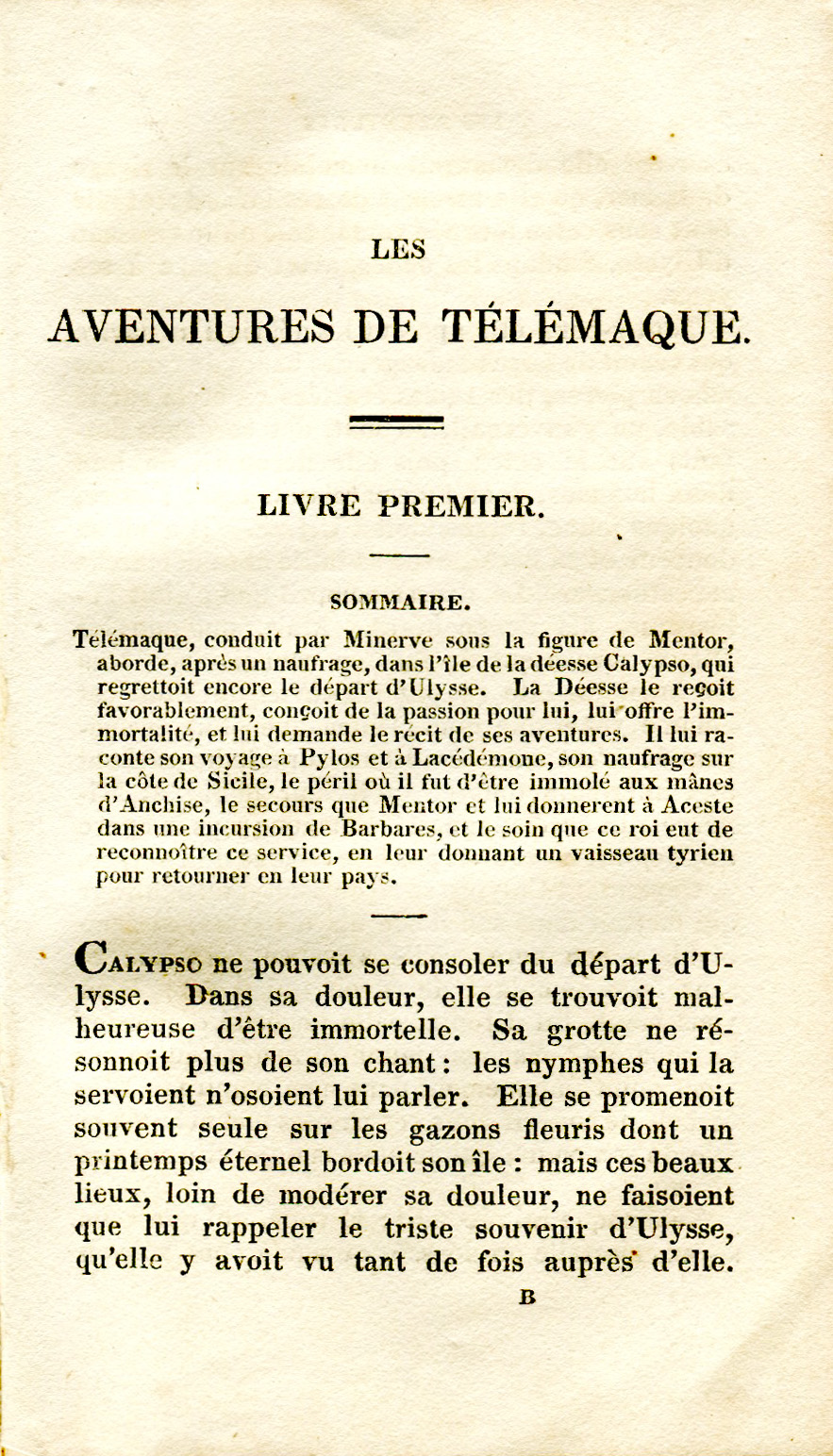
The first page of the first book of Les Aventures de Télémaque

The tutor Mentor is arguably the true hero of the book, much of which is given over to his speeches and advice on how to rule. Over and over, Mentor denounces war, luxury, and selfishness and proclaims the brotherhood of man and the necessity of altruism (though that term would only be coined in the 19th century by Auguste Comte). He recommends a complete overhaul of government and the abolition of the mercantile system and taxes on the peasantry and suggests a system of parliamentary government and a Federation of Nations to settle disputes between nations peacefully. As against luxury and imperialism (represented by ancient Rome) Fénelon holds up the ideal of the simplicity and relative equality of ancient Greece, an ideal that would be taken up by in the Romantic era of the 19th century. The form of government he looks to is an aristocratic republic in the form of a constitutional monarchy in which the ruler-prince is advised by a council of patricians.

== Reception ==
=== Early reception ===
Although set in a far-off place and ancient time, Télémaque was immediately recognized by contemporaries as a scathing rebuke to the autocratic reign of Louis XIV of France, whose wars and taxes on the peasantry had reduced the country to famine. Louis XIV, who had previously banished Fénelon from Versailles and confined him to his diocese because of a religious controversy, was so angered by the book that he maintained those restrictions on Fénelon's movements even when the religious dispute was resolved.

Yet a few years later royal panegyrists were hailing the young king Louis XV as a new Telemachus and flattering his tutors as new "Mentors". Later in the century, royal tutors gave the book to their charges, and King Louis XVI (1754–93) was strongly marked by it.

The French literary historian Jean-Claude Bonnet calls Télémaque "the true key to the museum of the eighteenth-century imagination". One of the most popular works of the century, it was an immediate best-seller both in France and abroad, going through many editions and translated into every European language and even Latin verse (first in Berlin in 1743, then in Paris by Étienne Viel [1737–87]). It inspired numerous imitations (such as the Abbé Jean Terrasson's novel Life of Sethos (1731); it also supplied the plot for Mozart's opera Idomeneo (1781).

With its message of world peace, simplicity and the brotherhood of man, Télémaque was a favorite of Montesquieu and of Jean-Jacques Rousseau, and through him of the French revolutionaries and of German Romantics such as Johann Gottfried Herder (1744–1803), who approvingly quotes Fénelon's remark "I love my family more than myself; more than my family my fatherland; more than my fatherland humankind". It was also a favorite of Thomas Jefferson, who re-read it frequently. It was also widely read in the Ottoman Empire and in Iran.

One critic explains the popularity of Télémaque this way:

Fénelon's story stood as a powerful rebuke to the aristocratic court culture that dominated European societies, with its perceived artificiality, hypocrisy, and monumental selfishness. The book did not simply express these feelings; it helped shape and popularize them. From its wellspring of sentimentality, a river of tenderly shed tears would flow straight through the eighteenth century, fed by Richardson, Greuze, and Rousseau, among others, finally to pour out into the broad sea of Romanticism.

=== Influence on Rousseau ===
In Rousseau's Émile (1762), a treatise on education, the eponymous pupil is specifically given only two novels (although as a young man, he also reads poetry and other literature): as a child he is given Daniel Defoe's Robinson Crusoe to inculcate him in resourcefulness and self-reliance; and when he becomes a young man, the political treatise Télémaque, which is put into his hands by his intended, Sophie, who has read it and fallen in love with the fictional hero.

The education of Émile is completed by a journey during which the institutions of various nations are to be studied. His tutor inculcates principles into him which sum up the essentials of the Social Contract. But it is with a Telemachus in hand that teacher and pupil establish a "scale of measurement" for judging various existing societies. Fénelon's story presents models and counter models of monarchs. The princes and governments of the real world will be compared with them.

In Rousseau's novel, Émile and his tutor travel to Salento (which formerly included much of what is now Calabria and Apulia, Italy) to seek the "good Idomeneo", whom Fénelon's novel had relocated from his former kingdom in Crete to the kingship of a new and reformed government.

Contrary to Louis XIV, whom he resembles in many traits of character, Idomeneus renounces conquest and is able to make peace with his neighbors. The prosperous fields and laborious capital are schools of virtue, where law rules over the monarch himself. Everything here is brought down to a "noble and frugal simplicity", and, in the harmony of a strictly hierarchical society, everything combines in a common utility.

=== Translations ===
The first German translation was almost immediately published in 1700 under the title "Staats-Roman, welcher unter der denckwürdigen Lebens-Beschreibung Telemachi Königl. Printzens aus Ithaca, und Sohns des Ulyssis vorstellet, wie die Königl. und Fürstlichen Printzen vermittelst eines anmuthigen Weges zur Staats-Kunst und Sitten-Lehre anzuführen durch Franciscum de Salinac de la Mothe-Fenelon Ertz-Bischoffen zu Cambray". Another German translation was published in 1733 under the title Die seltsamen Begebenheiten des Telemach and was very popular in German court circles at the time. It inspired Wilhelmine of Prussia, Margravine of Brandenburg-Bayreuth to design her English landscape garden, the Sanspareil.

The work is best known in Russia for a verse translation by Vasily Trediakovsky published in 1766 and entitled Tilemakhida, or the Wandering of Telemachus, Son of Odysseus (Тилемахида, или Странствование Тилемаха, сына Одиссеева). The translation is noted for its archaic diction and its use of hexameters. The work was ridiculed by Catherine the Great but defended by Alexander Radishchev and others.

Télémaque was translated into Ottoman Turkish in 1859 by Yusuf Kamil Pasha (1806–1876), a statesman who would later become grand vezir (prime minister) of the Ottoman Empire. It is considered the first translation of a European novel into Turkish.

=== Later reception ===
Tennyson, in his poem "Ulysses" (1842), may by implication be referring to Fénelon's conception of Telemachus's civilizing mission.

This is my son, mine own Telemachus,
To whom I leave the scepter and the isle
Well-loved of me, discerning to fulfill
This labor, by slow prudence to make mild
A rugged people, and through soft degrees
Subdue them to the useful and the good.
Most blameless is he, centered in the sphere
Of common duties, decent not to fail
In offices of tenderness, and pay
Meet adoration to my household gods,
When I am gone. He works his work, I mine.
