= Presseck =

- Municipality
- Coat of arms

- Location of Presseck within Kulmbach district
- Interactive map of Presseck
- Location within Germany Location within Bavaria
- Coordinates: 50°13′N 11°33′E
- Country: Germany
- State: Bavaria
- Admin. region: Oberfranken
- District: Kulmbach
- Subdivisions: 43 Ortsteile

Government
  - Mayor (2020–26): Christian Ruppert (CSU)

Area
  - Total: 54.96 km^{2} (21.22 sq mi)
- Elevation: 642 m (2,106 ft)

Population (2025-12-31)
  - Total: 1,630
  - Density: 29.7/km^{2} (76.8/sq mi)
- Time zone: UTC+01:00 (CET)
  - Summer (DST): UTC+02:00 (CEST)
- Postal codes: 95355
- Dialling codes: 09222
- Vehicle registration: KU
- Website: www.markt-presseck.de

Presseck is a municipality in the district of Kulmbach in Bavaria in Germany.

== City arrangement ==
Presseck is arranged in the following boroughs:

- Altenreuth
- Birken
- Braunersreuth
- Breiteneben
- Elbersreuth
- Elbersreuthermühle
- Eulenburg
- Fels
- Haid
- Heinersreuth
- Katzengraben
- Köstenberg
- Kreuzknock
- Kunreuth
- Neumühle
- Oberehesberg
- Ochsengarten
- Papiermühle
- Petersmühle
- Pinzenhof
- Premeusel
- Presseck
- Reichenbach
- Rützenreuth
- Schafhaus
- Schafhof
- Schlackenmühle
- Schlackenreuth
- Schlopp
- Schmölz
- Schnebes
- Schöndorf
- Schübelsmühle
- Seubetenreuth
- Spitzberg
- Teichmühle
- Trottenreuth
- Unterehesberg
- Waffenhammer
- Wahl
- Wartenfels
- Wildenstein
- Wustuben
