= Ködnitz =

- Municipality
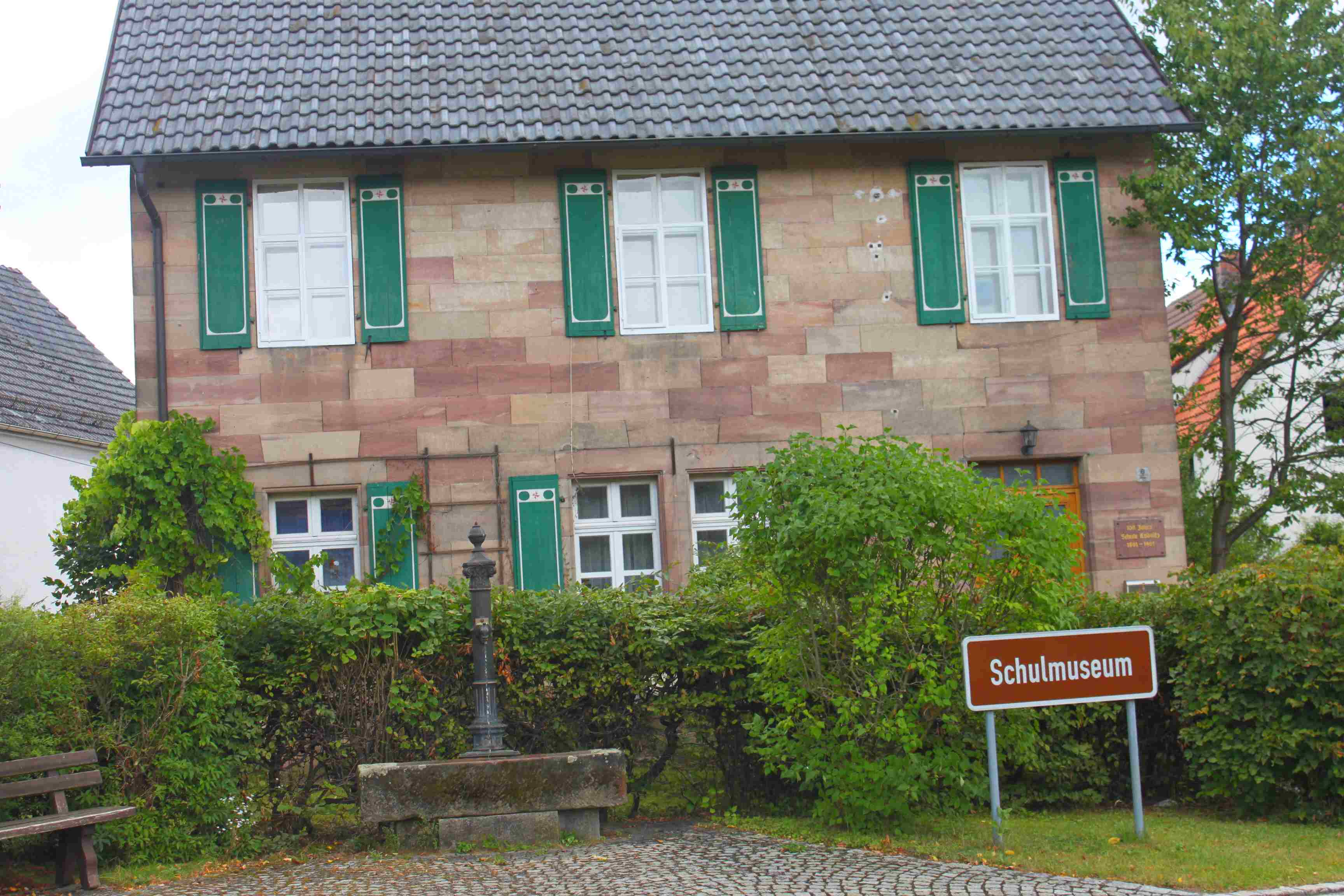
- School museum in Ködnitz

- Coat of arms

- Location of Ködnitz within Kulmbach district
- Interactive map of Ködnitz
- Location within Germany Location within Bavaria
- Coordinates: 50°6′N 11°31′E
- Country: Germany
- State: Bavaria
- Admin. region: Oberfranken
- District: Kulmbach
- Municipal assoc.: Trebgast
- Subdivisions: 14 Ortsteile

Government
  - Mayor (2020–26): Anita Sack

Area
  - Total: 19.62 km^{2} (7.58 sq mi)
- Elevation: 318 m (1,043 ft)

Population (2025-12-31)
  - Total: 1,469
  - Density: 74.87/km^{2} (193.9/sq mi)
- Time zone: UTC+01:00 (CET)
  - Summer (DST): UTC+02:00 (CEST)
- Postal codes: 95361
- Dialling codes: 09221
- Vehicle registration: KU
- Website: www.koednitz.de

Ködnitz is a municipality in the district of Kulmbach in Bavaria in Germany.

== Municipal division ==
Ködnitz is arranged in the following boroughs:

- Ebersbach
- Fölschnitz
- Forstlasmühle
- Haaghof
- Hauenreuth
- Heinersreuth
- Höllgraben
- Kauerndorf
- Ködnitz
- Leithen
- Listenberg
- Meierhof
- Mühlberg
- Pinsenhof
