= Stadtsteinach =

- Town
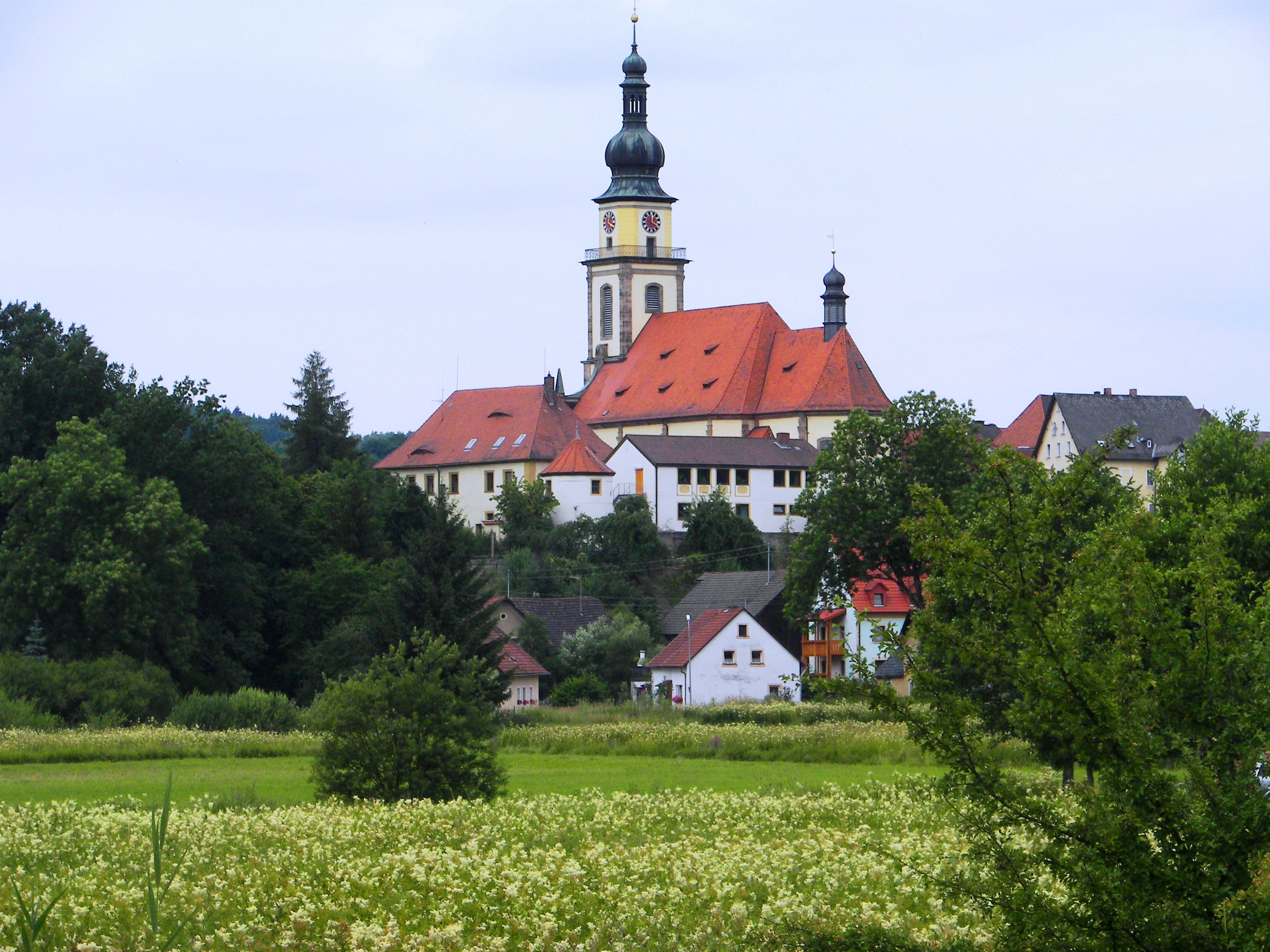
- Church in Stadtsteinach

- Coat of arms

- Location of Stadtsteinach within Kulmbach district
- Interactive map of Stadtsteinach
- Location within Germany Location within Bavaria
- Coordinates: 50°10′N 11°30′E
- Country: Germany
- State: Bavaria
- Admin. region: Oberfranken
- District: Kulmbach
- Municipal assoc.: Stadtsteinach
- Subdivisions: 27 Ortsteile

Government
  - Mayor (2020–26): Roland Wolfrum (SPD)

Area
  - Total: 39.79 km^{2} (15.36 sq mi)
- Elevation: 351 m (1,152 ft)

Population (2025-12-31)
  - Total: 2,996
  - Density: 75.30/km^{2} (195.0/sq mi)
- Time zone: UTC+01:00 (CET)
  - Summer (DST): UTC+02:00 (CEST)
- Postal codes: 95346
- Dialling codes: 09225
- Vehicle registration: KU (old: SAN)
- Website: www.stadtsteinach.de

Stadtsteinach (German pronunciation: [ʃtatˈʃtaɪnax]) is a town in the district of Kulmbach, in Bavaria, Germany. It is situated in the Franconian Forest, 8 km northeast of Kulmbach.

It is known for its proximity to mountains, fields and nature reserves.

== Town divisions ==
Stadtsteinach is arranged in the following boroughs:

- Stadtsteinach
- Bergleshof
- Große Birken
- Kleine Birken
- Deckenreuth
- Deinhardsmühle
- Eisenberg
- Forkel
- Frankenreuth
- Gründlein
- Hammermühle
- Hochofen
- Höfles
- Mittelhammer
- Oberhammer
- Oberzaubach
- Osenbaum
- Petschen
- Römersreuth
- Schwärzleinsdorf
- Schwand
- Silberklippe
- Triebenreuth
- Unterzaubach
- Vogtendorf
- Vorderreuth
- Ziegelhütte

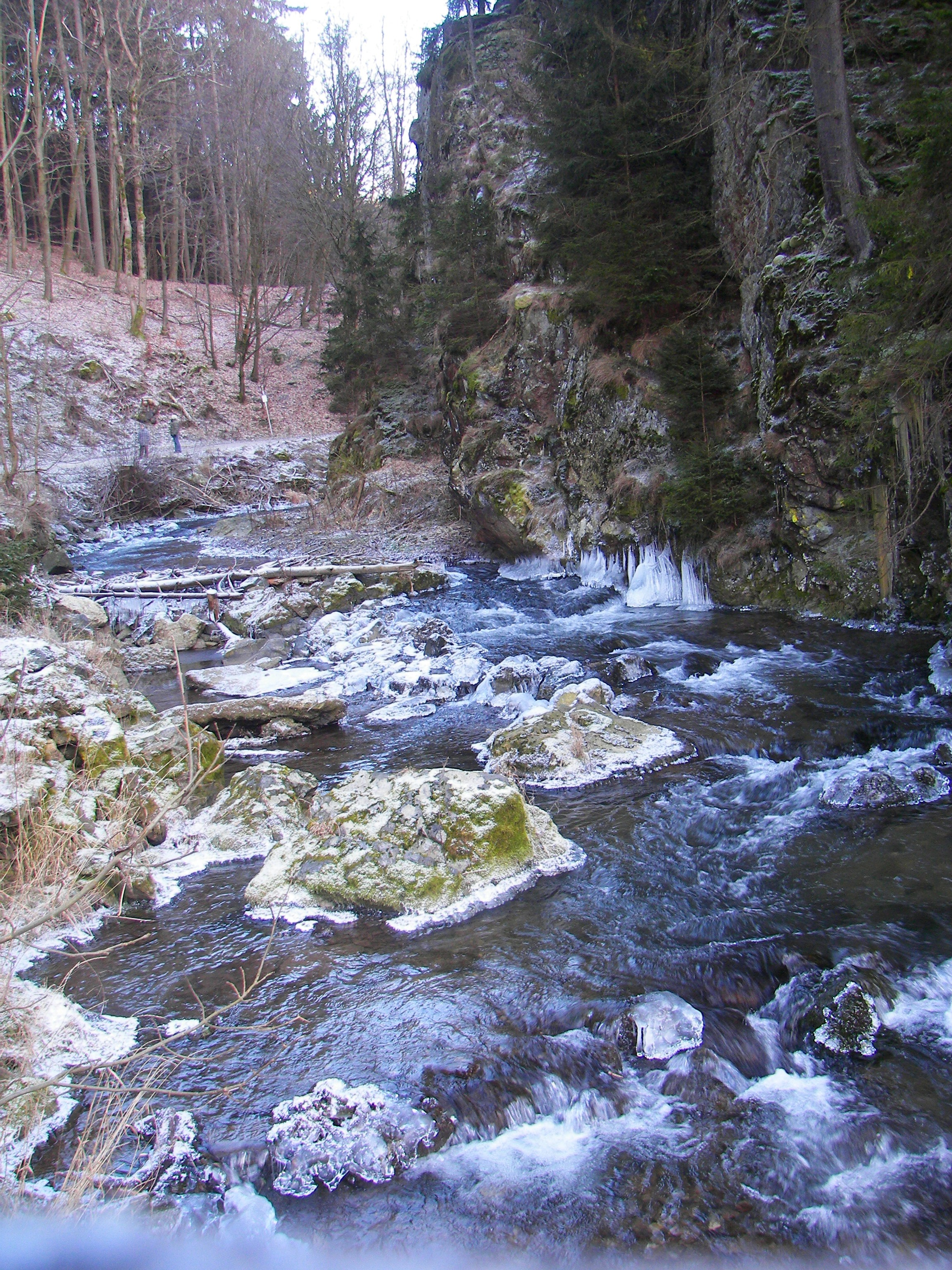
Steinachklamm in the valley of Untere Steinach river in winter

== Notable people ==
- Wilhelm Weiss (1892-1950), politician (NSDAP), SA-Obergruppenführer and chief editor of the Völkischer Beobachter
- Jörg Dittwar (born 1963), footballer
- Simone Mathes (born 1975), hammer thrower, several times German champion during the 1990s
