= Stadtsteinach (Verwaltungsgemeinschaft) =

- Verwaltungsgemeinschaft
- Location of Stadtsteinach within Kulmbach district
- Interactive map of Stadtsteinach
- Location within Germany Location within Bavaria
- Coordinates: 50°10′N 11°30′E
- Country: Germany
- State: Bavaria
- Admin. region: Upper Franconia
- District: Kulmbach
- Seat: Stadtsteinach
- Subdivisions: 2 municipalities

Area
  - Total: 57.12 km^{2} (22.05 sq mi)

Population (2025-12-31)
  - Total: 3,925
  - Density: 68.71/km^{2} (178.0/sq mi)
- Time zone: UTC+01:00 (CET)
  - Summer (DST): UTC+02:00 (CEST)
- Website: www.stadtsteinach.de

Stadtsteinach is a Verwaltungsgemeinschaft (municipal association) in the district of Kulmbach in Bavaria, Germany. Its seat is in Stadtsteinach.

It consists of the following municipalities:

1. Rugendorf
2. Stadtsteinach
