= Trebgast (Verwaltungsgemeinschaft) =

- Verwaltungsgemeinschaft
- Location of Trebgast within Kulmbach district
- Interactive map of Trebgast
- Location within Germany Location within Bavaria
- Coordinates: 50°04′N 11°30′E
- Country: Germany
- State: Bavaria
- Admin. region: Upper Franconia
- District: Kulmbach
- Seat: Trebgast
- Subdivisions: 3 municipalities

Area
  - Total: 47.95 km^{2} (18.51 sq mi)

Population (2025-12-31)
  - Total: 3,924
  - Density: 81.84/km^{2} (212.0/sq mi)
- Time zone: UTC+01:00 (CET)
  - Summer (DST): UTC+02:00 (CEST)
- Website: www.vg-trebgast.de

Trebgast is a Verwaltungsgemeinschaft (municipal association) in the district of Kulmbach in Bavaria, Germany. Its seat is in Trebgast.

It consists of the following municipalities:

1. Harsdorf
2. Ködnitz
3. Trebgast
