= Grafengehaig =

- Municipality
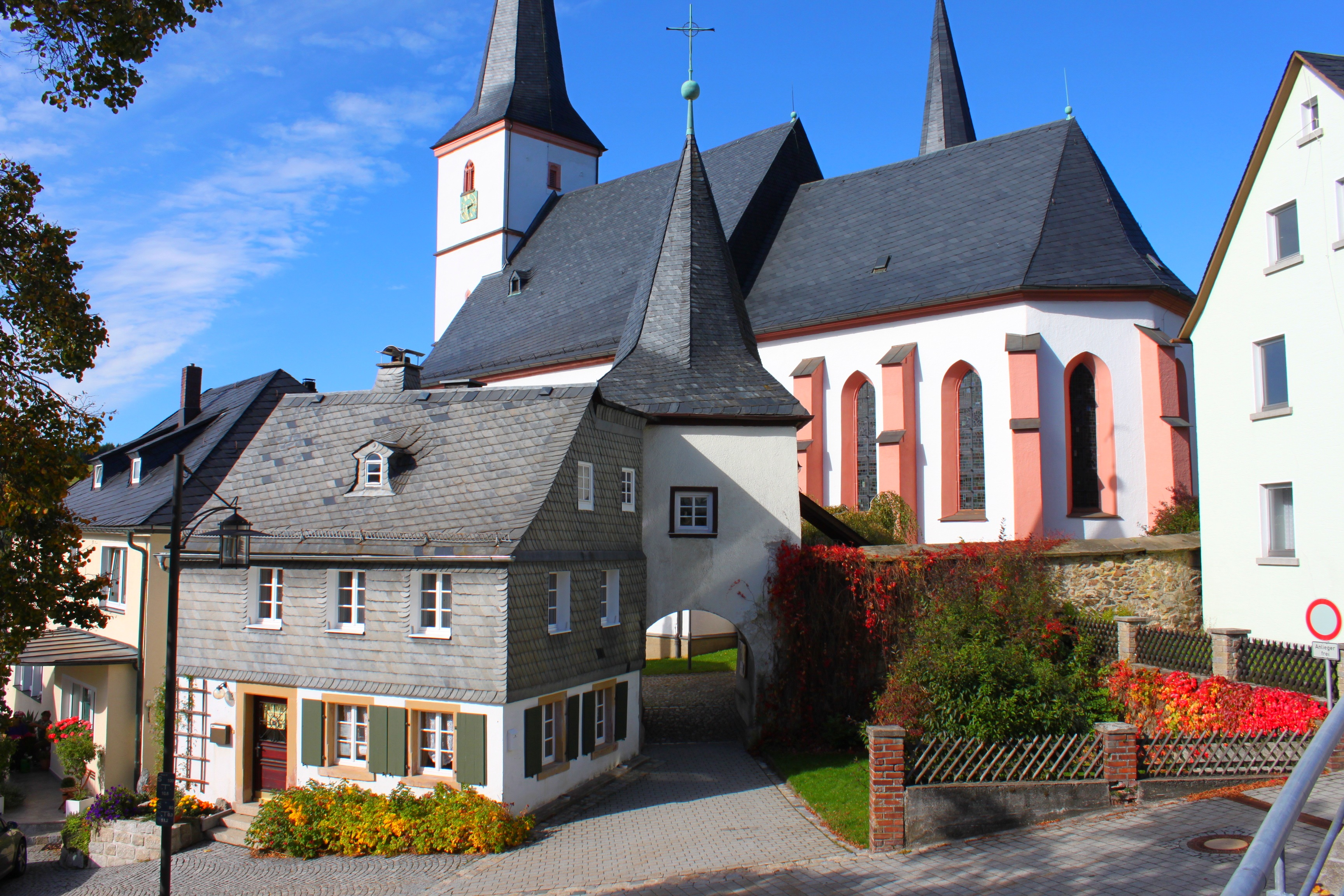
- Fortified church of the Holy Spirit in Grafengehaig

- Coat of arms

- Location of Grafengehaig within Kulmbach district
- Interactive map of Grafengehaig
- Location within Germany Location within Bavaria
- Coordinates: 50°12′N 11°34′E
- Country: Germany
- State: Bavaria
- Admin. region: Oberfranken
- District: Kulmbach
- Municipal assoc.: Marktleugast
- Subdivisions: 27 Ortsteile

Government
  - Mayor (2020–26): Werner Burger

Area
  - Total: 20.80 km^{2} (8.03 sq mi)
- Elevation: 568 m (1,864 ft)

Population (2025-12-31)
  - Total: 840
  - Density: 40/km^{2} (100/sq mi)
- Time zone: UTC+01:00 (CET)
  - Summer (DST): UTC+02:00 (CEST)
- Postal codes: 95356
- Dialling codes: 09255
- Vehicle registration: KU
- Website: https://www.grafengehaig.de/

Grafengehaig is a municipality in the district of Kulmbach in Bavaria in Germany.

It is a part of the Franconian Forest nature park.

== City arrangement ==
Grafengehaig is arranged in the following boroughs:

- Bromenhof
- Eppenreuth
- Grafengehaig
- Guttenberger Hammer
- Hetzenhof
- Hintererb
- Höhhof
- Hohenreuth
- Horbach
- Hübnersmühle
- Hüttenbach
- Mehlthaumühle
- Mesethmühle
- Oberweißenstein

- Rappetenreuth
- Schindelwald
- Schlockenau
- Seifersreuth
- Vollauf
- Vollaufmühle
- Vordererb
- Walberngrün
- Waldhermes
- Weidmes
- Weiglas
- Weißenstein
- Zegast
