= Marktleugast =

- Municipality
- Coat of arms

- Location of Marktleugast within Kulmbach district
- Interactive map of Marktleugast
- Location within Germany Location within Bavaria
- Coordinates: 50°10′N 11°37′E
- Country: Germany
- State: Bavaria
- Admin. region: Oberfranken
- District: Kulmbach
- Municipal assoc.: Marktleugast
- Subdivisions: 23 Ortsteile

Government
  - Mayor (2020–26): Franz Uome (CSU)

Area
  - Total: 33.89 km^{2} (13.09 sq mi)
- Elevation: 544–627 m (1,785–2,057 ft)

Population (2025-12-31)
  - Total: 2,946
  - Density: 86.93/km^{2} (225.1/sq mi)
- Time zone: UTC+01:00 (CET)
  - Summer (DST): UTC+02:00 (CEST)
- Postal codes: 95352
- Dialling codes: 09255
- Vehicle registration: KU
- Website: www.marktleugast.de

Marktleugast is a municipality in the district of Kulmbach in Bavaria in Germany.

== Geography ==
Marktleugast is located on the southeastern edge of the Frankenwald Nature Park.

== City arrangement ==
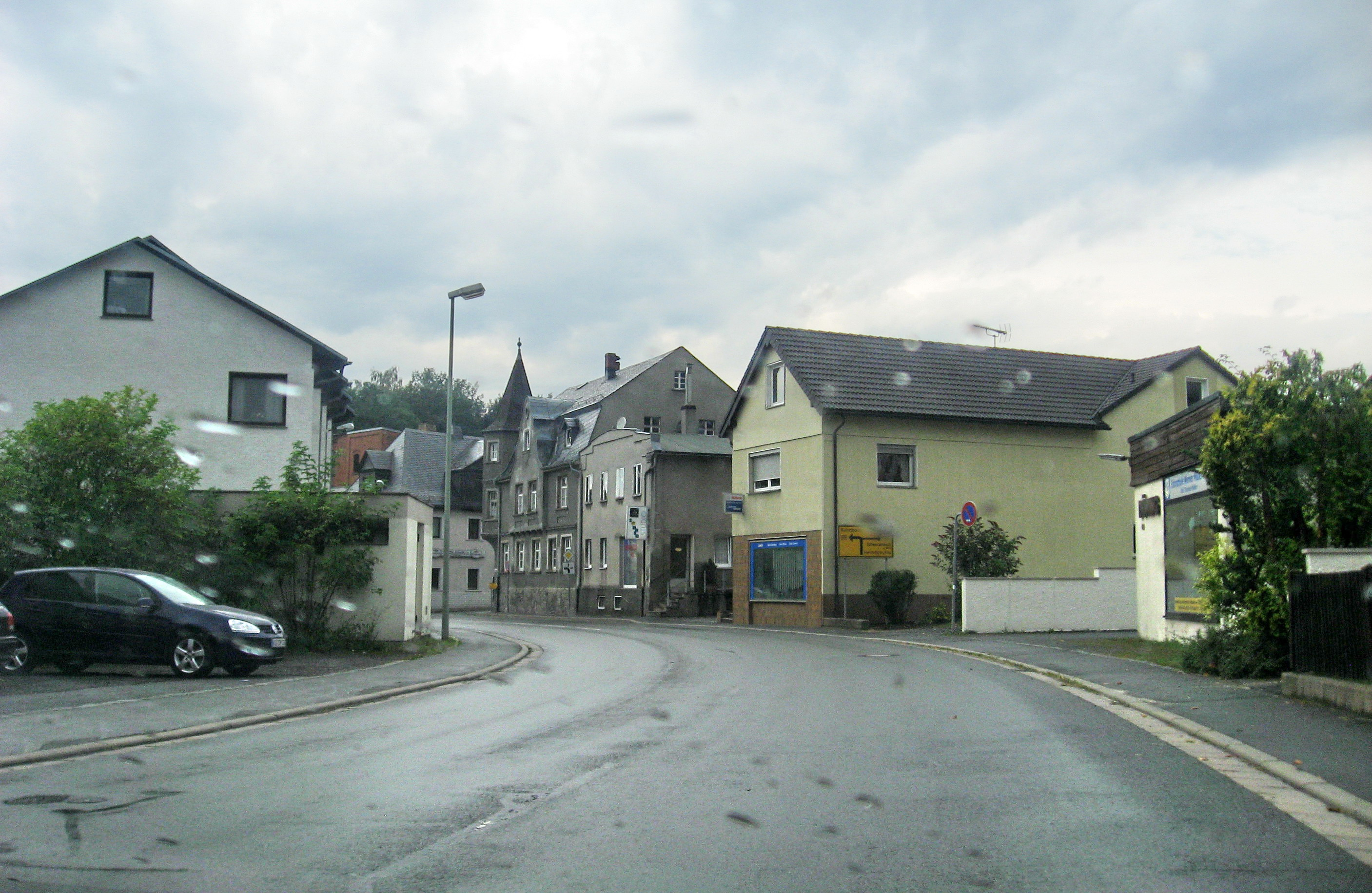
Marktleugast

Marktleugast is arranged in the following boroughs:

- Baiersbach
- Filshof
- Großrehmühle
- Hanauerhof
- Hermes
- Hinterrehberg
- Hohenberg
- Hohenreuth
- Kleinrehmühle
- Kosermühle
- Mannsflur
- Marienweiher
- Marktleugast
- Mittelrehberg
- Neuensorg
- Ösel
- Roth
- Steinbach
- Tannenwirtshaus
- Traindorf
- Vorderrehberg
- Weihermühle
- Zegastmühle
