= Harsdorf =

- Municipality
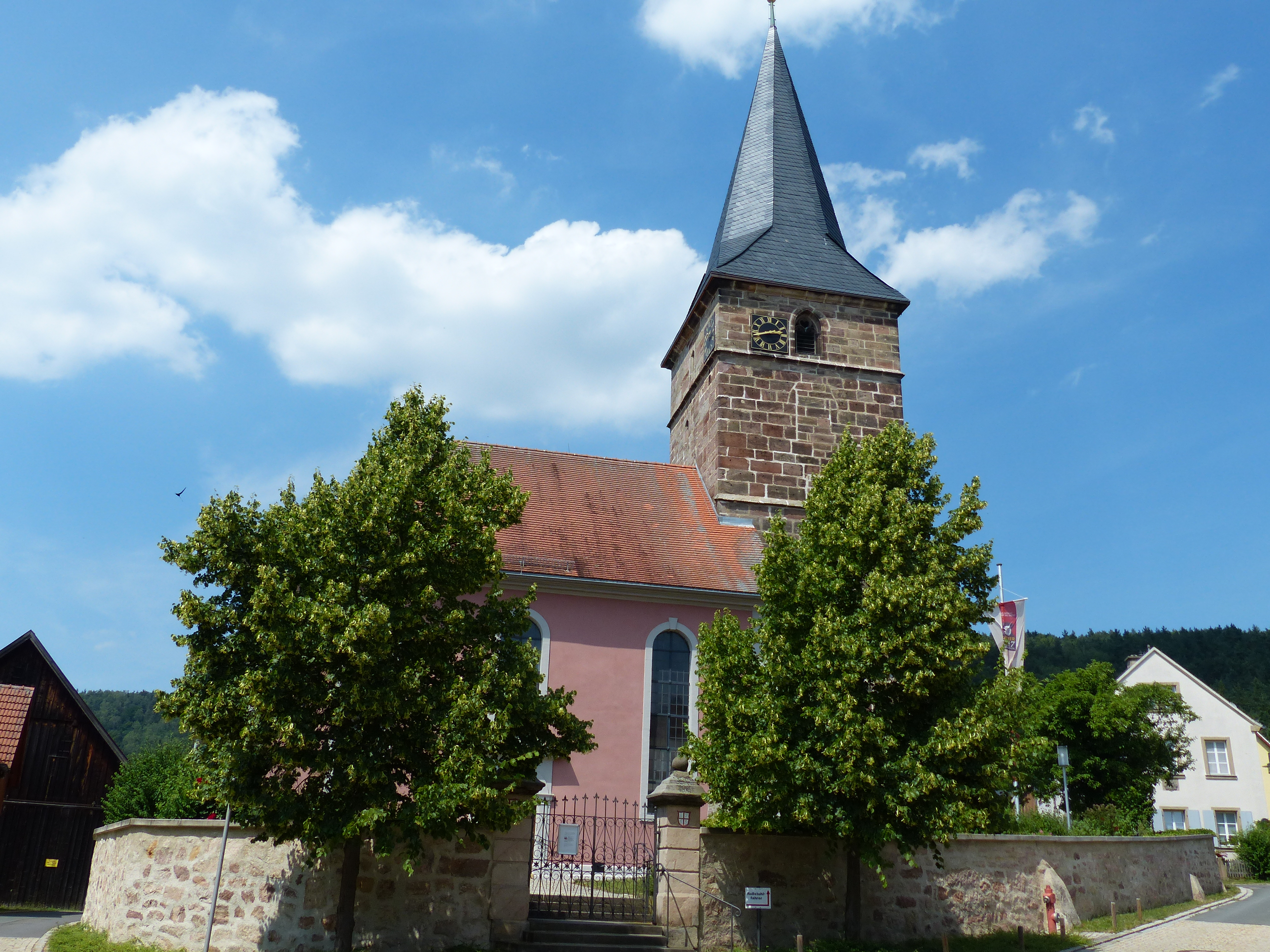
- Church of Saint Martin

- Coat of arms

- Location of Harsdorf within Kulmbach district
- Interactive map of Harsdorf
- Location within Germany Location within Bavaria
- Coordinates: 50°1′N 11°34′E
- Country: Germany
- State: Bavaria
- Admin. region: Oberfranken
- District: Kulmbach
- Municipal assoc.: Trebgast
- Subdivisions: 14 Ortsteile

Government
  - Mayor (2020–26): Günther Hübner (CSU)

Area
  - Total: 10.18 km^{2} (3.93 sq mi)
- Elevation: 351 m (1,152 ft)

Population (2025-12-31)
  - Total: 942
  - Density: 92.5/km^{2} (240/sq mi)
- Time zone: UTC+01:00 (CET)
  - Summer (DST): UTC+02:00 (CEST)
- Postal codes: 95499
- Dialling codes: 09203
- Vehicle registration: KU
- Website: www.gemeinde-harsdorf.de

Harsdorf is a municipality in the district of Kulmbach in Bavaria in Germany.

== City arrangement ==
Harsdorf is arranged in the following boroughs:

- Altenreuth
- Brauneck
- Harsdorf
- Haselbach
- Hettersreuth
- Holzlucken
- Lettenhof
- Oberlaitsch /Seyerhaus
- Oberlohe
- Ritterleithen
- Sandreuth
- Unitz
- Unterlohe
- Zettmeisel
