= Mentor (Odyssey) =

Son of Alcimus in Greek mythology

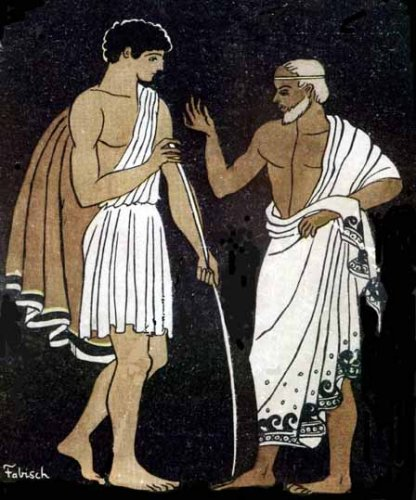
A 1956 illustration of Telemachus and Mentor

Mentor (Greek: Μέντωρ, Méntōr) is a figure in Greek mythology who plays a significant role in Homer’s Odyssey as the advisor to Odysseus’s son Telemachus. The character is the source of the term mentor in various languages.

== The Odyssey ==
In the Odyssey, Mentor is the son of Alcimus and a trusted friend to Odysseus, king of Ithaca. When Odysseus had been called off the island to fight in the extended Trojan War, he left Mentor in charge of his palace.

When Odysseus fails to return from the war, Ithaca is beset by suitors who wish to marry his wife Penelope, and wreak havoc at the palace. When Telemachus calls an assembly to ask for help in expelling them, Mentor unsuccessfully tries to rally the people to the prince's side. Subsequently, the goddess Athena takes the form of Mentor to guide Telemachus on his own voyage to discover what became of Odysseus in the section of the epic known as the Telemachy.

== Later literature and the term "mentor" ==
Mentor (and Athena disguised as Mentor) is a major character in popular 1699 novel Les Aventures de Télémaque by French archbishop and author François Fénelon. Fénelon's book expands on the narrative from Homer's Telemachy, with Athena taking the form of Mentor to advise Télémaque through challenges that teach him how to become a good and just king. Whereas Mentor is a minor character the Odyssey, an old friend of Odysseus who seemingly failed in his charge to maintain the household, in Télémaque he takes on a much larger role as Telemachus' counsellor.

Following Mentor's appearance in Télémaque, his name was adopted into various languages as a term for someone who shares wisdom and knowledge with a less-experienced colleague. "Mentor" in this sense is first attested in German in 1725, in French in 1749, in English in 1750 and in Spanish in 1785, with the variant mentore appearing in Italian in 1789.
