= Kulmbach (district) =

Coordinates: 50°05′N 11°30′E

- District
- Flag Coat of arms
- Country: Germany
- State: Bavaria
- Adm. region: Upper Franconia
- Capital: Kulmbach

Government
  - District admin.: Klaus Peter Söllner (FW)

Area
  - Total: 656 km^{2} (253 sq mi)

Population (31 December 2025)
  - Total: 70,997
  - Density: 108/km^{2} (280/sq mi)
- Time zone: UTC+01:00 (CET)
  - Summer (DST): UTC+02:00 (CEST)
- Vehicle registration: KU, SAN
- Website: landkreis-kulmbach.de

Kulmbach is a Landkreis (district) in Bavaria, Germany. It is bounded by (from the north and clockwise) the districts of Kronach, Hof, Bayreuth and Lichtenfels.

== History ==
The historical centre of the region was the castle of Plassenburg in the city of Kulmbach. In 1135 this castle was first mentioned. The rulers of the castle and the surrounding lands were the counts of Andechs (1135–1248, from 1135 to 1180 Dießen-Andechs, from 1180 to 1248 Andechs-Meranien) and the Thuringian counts of Orlamünde (1260–1340). After the death of the last count of Orlamünde the region fell to the Hohenzollern state.

In 1398 the Hohenzollern state was divided, and in the Franconian area the two states of Ansbach and Kulmbach were founded. When the Hohenzollern family was awarded the margravate of Brandenburg, these states were called Brandenburg-Ansbach and Brandenburg-Kulmbach, but not united with Brandenburg proper. In 1603 the castle of Plassenburg was abandoned, and the capital was moved to the city of Bayreuth. The importance of the city of Kulmbach declined hereafter, although the margraves (and sometimes the population of Kulmbach) often used to take shelter on the castle during the years of the Thirty Years' War.

The last margrave of Brandenburg-Bayreuth (as Brandenburg-Kulmbach was called now) abdicated in 1792 in order to cede his property to his cousin, the king of Prussia. However, this was a short episode. In 1806 Kulmbach surrendered to Napoleon, who ordered the razing of Plassenburg castle. In 1810 the region fell to Bavaria and remained so to date.

The district of Kulmbach was founded soon after. The city of Kulmbach did not belong to the district until 1972, when city and district were merged.

According to a tour guide in Kulmbach, the castle Plassenburg was used by Adolf Hitler as the headquarters for his Highway Department. The highway "A9" was built under Nazi rule, connecting Berlin and Munich, and running past Kulmbach.

After the Second World War, the castle was used as a camp for German prisoners of war under the US military control. One of those stayed employed later as a keeper of natural and biological resources of the castle.

The city is also known for a brewery, producing the strongest beer (11.8% alcohol) available in Germany.

== Events ==
Kulmbach features a series of established periodics:

- Kulmbacher Volksfest, May
- Classic Car Festival 'Kulmbacher Oldtimer Treffen', June
- Old Town Festival 'Altstadtfest' taking place in vast areas of the historic city center, July
- Beer Festival 'Kulmbacher Beer Week', established 1939, largest of many beer festivals in northern Bavaria with approximately 120,000 visitors in 2018, spans nine days end of July/beginning of August
- Christmas market 'Weihnachtsmarkt', 3 days, Friday through the first Sunday in Advent
- 'Heiliger Frühschoppen' - morning get-together of former and current citizens at Christmas Eve in the historic town. Streets are closed for traffic and several thousand people take a chance to meet long-time-not-seen friends and find new ones.
- 'Mönchshof Triathlon', sports event established 1984, May/June

== Geography ==
The district, surrounding the ancient city of Kulmbach, is located on the southern edge of Franconian Forest and Fichtel Mountains. The two headstreams of the river Main, White Main and Red Main, meet in the centre of the district.

== Coat of arms ==
The coat of arms displays:

- the heraldic lion of Bamberg
- the heraldic eagle of Andechs
- the black and white pattern of the Hohenzollern family

== Towns and municipalities ==
Clickable map of towns and municipalities in the district

Towns
1. Kulmbach
Märkte
1. Mainleus
2. Marktschorgast
3. Presseck
4. Thurnau
5. Wirsberg
Municipalities
1. Himmelkron
2. Neudrossenfeld
3. Neuenmarkt

Verwaltungsgemeinschaften
1. Kasendorf; 1. Kasendorf^{1,3}; 2. Wonsees^{3}	2. Marktleugast; 1. Grafengehaig^{3}; 2. Marktleugast^{1,3}	3. Stadtsteinach; 1. Rugendorf; 2. Stadtsteinach^{1,2}	4. Trebgast; 1. Harsdorf; 2. Ködnitz; 3. Trebgast^{1}	5. Untersteinach; 1. Guttenberg; 2. Kupferberg^{2}; 3. Ludwigschorgast^{3}; 4. Untersteinach^{1}
^{1}seat of the Verwaltungsgemeinschaft; ^{2}town; ^{3}Markt
