= Bundesautobahn 93 =

Federal motorway in Germany

A 93
- Bundesautobahn 93

Route information
- Length: 276 km (171 mi)

Major junctions
- A 72

Location
- Country: Germany
- States: Bavaria

Highway system
- Roads in Germany; Autobahns; List; Federal; List; State; E-roads
| ← A 92 | → A 94 |

Bundesautobahn 93 (translates from German as Federal Motorway 93, short form Autobahn 93, abbreviated as BAB 93 or A 93) is an autobahn in Bavaria, Germany.

== Route ==
=== Summary ===
It consists of two parts: one is a short track, from the A 8, near the Austrian border, to the Inntal Autobahn (A12) in Tyrol, Austria, the other from Hof A 72 in the north of Bavaria to Holledau A 9. A connection between the two parts was planned but not implemented. For a connection of the two tracks Bundesstraße B 15n is in construction and will be the foundation of the Autobahn A 93 later on. Currently, the A 93 has an overall length of 276 kilometres (171 mi).

== Exit list ==
Legend:

- I/C - Interchange, I/S - Intersection, RSA - Rest and service area, OBR - Overhead bridge restaurant, R/R - Restaurant and rest plaza, L/B - Layby, V/P - Vista point, TN - tunnel, T/P - Toll plaza, BR - Bridge
- C - Cloverleaf, S - Stack, T-A - Trumpet-A, T-B - Trumpet-B, DT - Directional-T/Y, SDT - Semi-Directional-T/Y, P-Y - Partial-Y, D - Diamond, P-C - Partial cloverleaf, D-D - Diverging diamond, D-R - Direct ramp

| (1) | Hochfranken 3-way interchange A 72 E441 |
| (2) | Hof-Ost B 173 |
| BR | Krebsbachtalbrück 200 m |
| RSA | Rest area Bärenholz |
| (3) | Regnitzlosau |
| BR | Regnitztalbrücke 210 m |
| (4) | Hof-Süd B 15 |
| (5) | Rehau-Nord |
| (6) | Rehau-Süd B 289 |
| BR | Straße 50 m |
| BR | Perlenbachbrücke 290 m |
| BR | Grünbrücke Rehauer Forst 50 m |
| (7) | Schönwald |
| BR | Stockbachtalbrücke 130 m |
| BR | Talbrücke 60 m |
| (8) | Selb-Nord |
| (9) | Selb-West |
| TN | Tunnel Einhausung Unterweißenbach 330 m |
| BR | Ohře 70 m |
| BR | Dangesbachtalbrücke 50 m |
| (10) | Höchstädt |
| (11) | Thiersheim |
| BR | Talbrücke 150 m |
| (12) | Wunsiedel |
| RSA | Rest area Peuntbach |
| BR | Röslautalbrücke 210 m |
| (13) | Marktredwitz-Nord B 303 E48 |
| (14) | Marktredwitz-Süd |
| (15) | Pechbrunn |
| BR | Seibertsbachtalbrücke 80 m |
| (16) | Mitterteich-Nord B 15 |
| BR | Wondrebtalbrücke 240 m |
| (17) | Mitterteich-Süd B 299 |
| BR | Talbrücke 120 m |
| (18) | Wiesau |
| (19) | Falkenberg B 299 |
| | Services Waldnaabtal |
| BR | Waldnaab 210 m |
| (20) | Windischeshenbach |
| BR | Waldnaab 340 m |
| RSA | parking area |
| (21a) | Neustadt an der Waldnaab B 15 |
| RSA | parking area |
| (21b) | Altenstadt an der Waldnaab B 22 |
| (22) | Weiden-Nord |
| (23) | Weiden-West B 470 |
| BR | Bahnstrecke Weiden-Bayreuth 50 m |
| (24) | Weiden-Frauenricht |
| BR | Hochstraße 210 m |
| (25) | Weiden-Süd |
| BR | Waldnaab 160 m |
| (26) | Luhe-Wildenau |
| BR | Naab 200 m |
| RSA | Rest area Grünau |
| (27) | Wernberg-Köblitz B 14 |
| (28) | Oberpfälzer Wald 4-way interchange A 6 E50 |
| BR | Naab 310 m |
| BR | Pfreimdbrücke 60 m |
| (29) | Pfreimd |
| BR | Rest area |
| (30) | Nabburg |
| | Wölsendorf (under construction) |
| BR | Schwarzach 210 m |
| (31) | Schwarzenfeld |
| RSA | parking area |
| RSA | parking area |
| (32) | Schwandorf-Nord B 85 |
| RSA | parking area |
| BR | Bahnstrecke 60 m |
| (33) | Schwandorf-Mitte B 85 |
| RSA | parking area |
| (34) | Schwandorf-Süd |
| (35) | Teublitz |
| BR | Schützengrabentalbrücke 120 m |
| (36) | Ponholz B 15 |
| (37) | Regenstauf |
| RSA | parking area |
| RSA | parking area |
| (38) | Regensburg-Nord B 16 |
| TN | Tunnel Pfaffensteintunnel 880 m |
| (39) | Regensburg-Pfaffenstein B 8 |
| BR | Donau 539 m |
| (40) | Regensburg-West |
| TN | Tunnel Prüfening 670 m |
| (41) | Regensburg-Prüfening |
| (42) | Regensburg-Königswiesen |
| (43) | Regensburg-Kumpfmühl |
| (44) | Autobahnkreuz Regensburg 4-way interchange A 3 E56 |
| (45) | Regensburg-Süd B 16 |
| | Services Pentling |
| Under construction | Rest area Pentling (under construction) |
| (46) | Bad Abbach |
| (47) | Saalhaupt 3-way interchange B 15n |
| (48) | Hausen |
| RSA | parking area |
| (49) | Abensberg |
| (50) | Siegenburg B 299 |
| RSA | Rest area |
| BR | Abens 100 m |
| (51) | Elsendorf B 301 |
| (52) | Aiglsbach |
| (53) | Mainburg |
| (54) | Wolnzach |
| (55) | Holledau 3-way interchange A 9 E45 |
| | A 8 A 9 A 99 |
| (56) | Inntal 3-way interchange A 8 E45 E52 E60 |
| (57) | Reischenhart B 15 |
| (58) | Brannenburg |
| RSA | Rest area |
| RSA | parking area |
| RSA | parking area |
| (59) | Oberaudorf B 171 |
| (60) | Kiefersfelden |
| | Services / Motel Inntal |
| BR | Inn 340 m |
| (61) | Grenzubergng Kiefersfelden border crossing |
| | Austria A 12 |

== Accidents ==
On 1 August 2023, an American military vehicle collided with a civilian truck while trying to enter A 93. One American soldier was killed in the collision. The A 93 was closed for several hours afterward.
