= Painten =

- Municipality
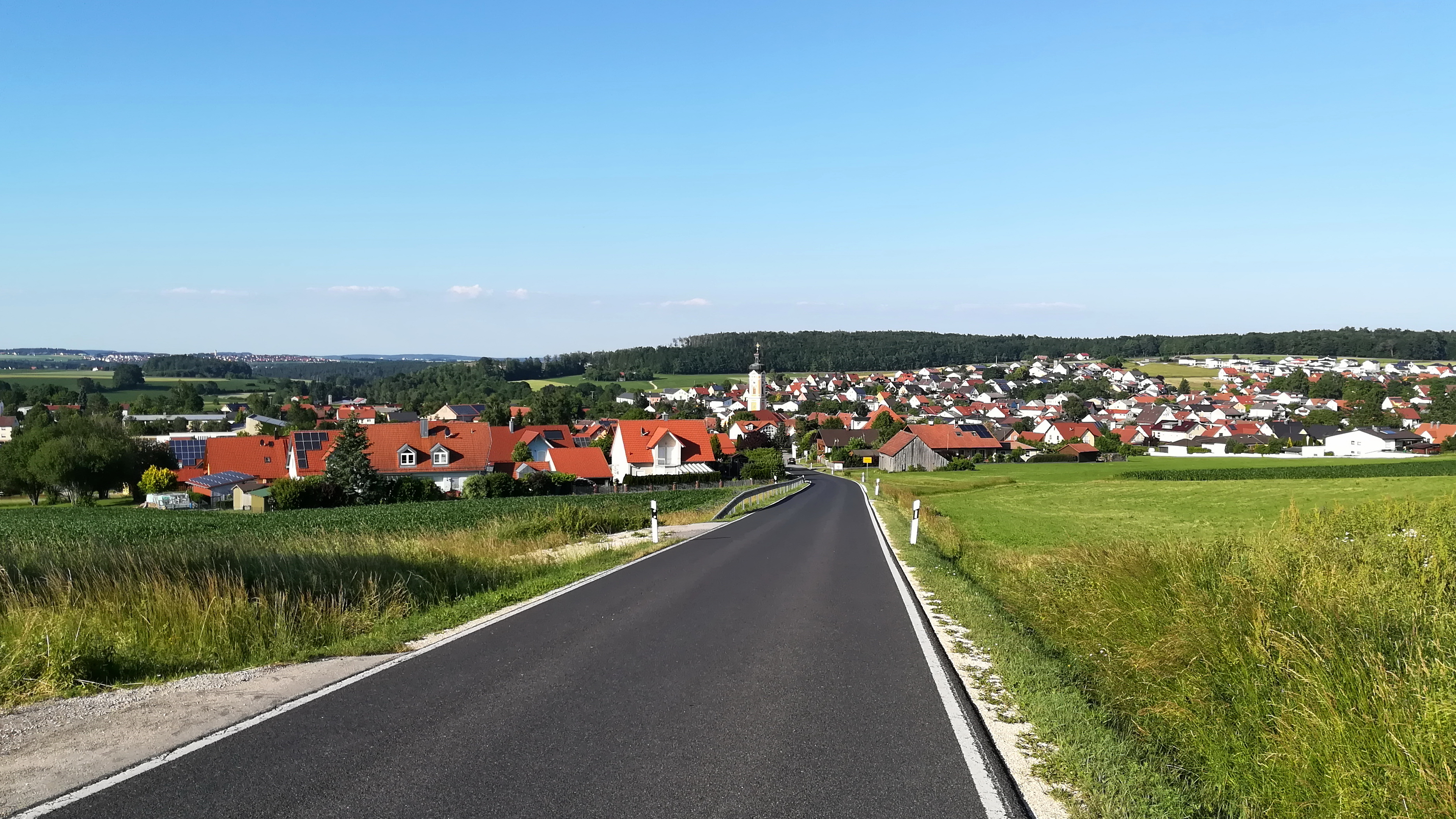
- Painten can be seen in background

- Coat of arms

- Location of Painten within Kelheim district
- Interactive map of Painten
- Location within Germany Location within Bavaria
- Coordinates: 49°0′N 11°49′E
- Country: Germany
- State: Bavaria
- Admin. region: Niederbayern
- District: Kelheim

Government
  - Mayor (2020–26): Michael Raßhofer (CSU)

Area
  - Total: 36.89 km^{2} (14.24 sq mi)
- Elevation: 490 m (1,610 ft)

Population (2025-12-31)
  - Total: 2,313
  - Density: 62.70/km^{2} (162.4/sq mi)
- Time zone: UTC+01:00 (CET)
  - Summer (DST): UTC+02:00 (CEST)
- Postal codes: 93351
- Dialling codes: 09499
- Vehicle registration: KEH
- Website: www.painten.de

Painten (German pronunciation: [ˈpaɪntn̩]) is a municipality in the district of Kelheim in Bavaria in Germany.

== Geography ==
The town is located about ten kilometers northwest of Kelheim and twenty kilometers west of Regensburg at an altitude of about 500 m above sea level. It is situated on the southern Franconian Jura in the southeastern part of the historical Tangrintel region, a predominantly wooded plateau lying between the Altmühl and Schwarzen Laber rivers. All villages are located in the western part of the municipality, the east is occupied by the Paintner Forest.

=== Community structure ===
There are twelve parts of the municipality (the settlement type is indicated in brackets):

- Berg (hamlet)
- Falterhof (wilderness)
- Maierhofen (church village)
- Mantlach (hamlet)
- Netzstall (village)
- Neulohe (village)
- Painten (main town)
- Prexlhof (wilderness)
- Rothenbügl (village)
- Streithäusl (wilderness)
- Wasenhütte (wilderness)
- Wieseneck (wilderness)

There are the districts Klingen - Painten, Neulohe, Painten, Paintner Forst and Rothenbügl.

== History ==
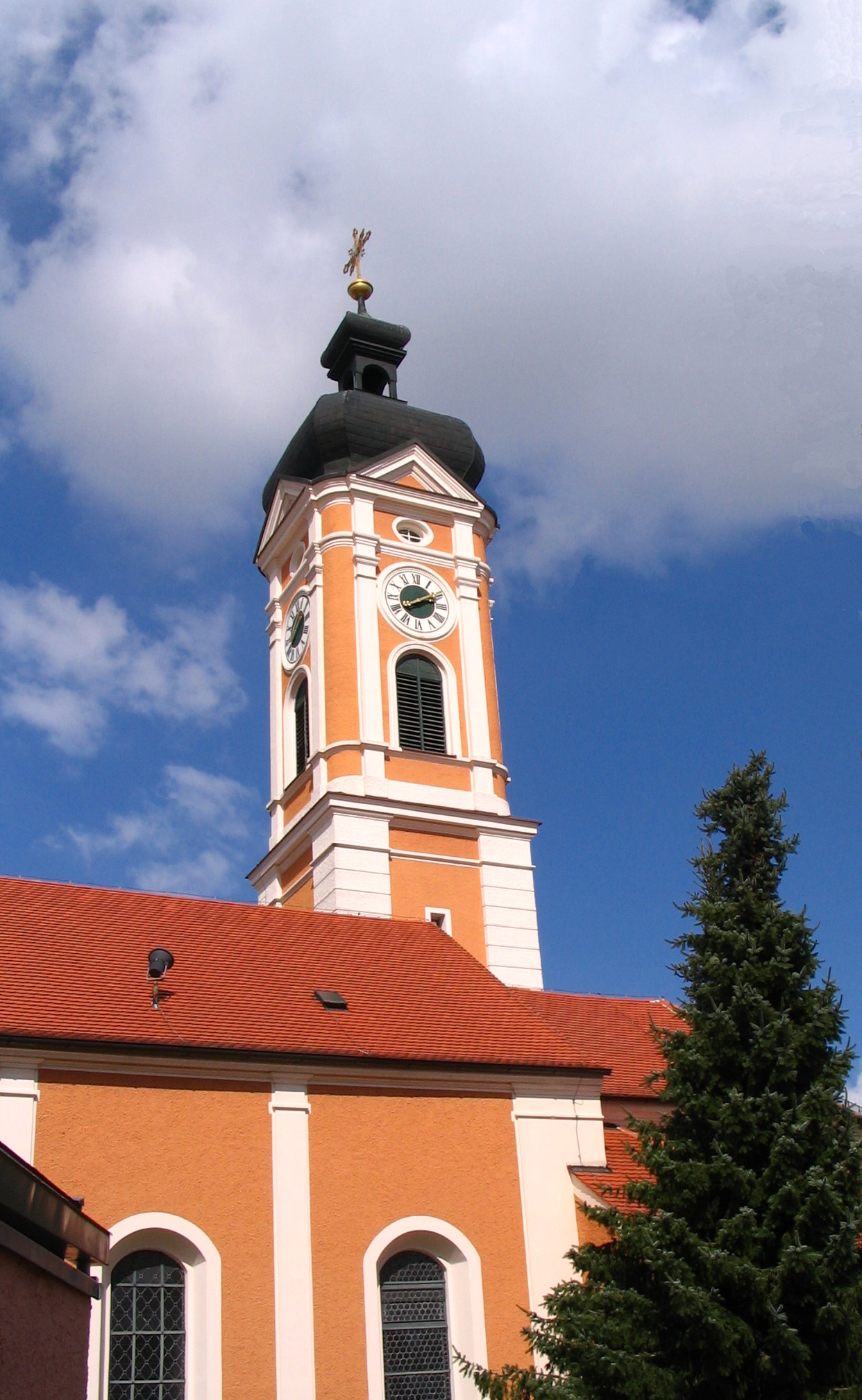
St. George

=== Until the 19th century ===
Around 1150, the place name was first mentioned in documents as "Piwente" and from about 1150 to 1160 as "Piunten" in the literal records of the Prüfening Abbey. In 1293, the place was called "Peinten" and finally "Painten" in 1584. The name of the place goes back to the field name "biunta" or "piunte", which in Old High German meant something like "enclosed property".

In 1293, Painten was mentioned together with Hemau and the Tangrintel in the agreement between Count Gebhard von Hirschberg and Duke Ludwig II of Bavaria. Until 1305, the town belonged to the County of Hirschberg, then to the Duchy of Upper Bavaria, and from 1505 to the newly founded Duchy of Neuburg and its Hemau custodianship. The town had probably already achieved its market freedom as an economic center in the southern part of the Hemau custodianship before 1500.

Painten lay on a salt road that led from Salzburg via Altötting, Landshut, and Kelheim to Nuremberg. In 1505, the town became a toll station for the Palatinate-Neuburg region and a border town to the Duchy of Bavaria for almost three centuries.

During the Lutheran Reformation by Count Palatine Ottheinrich, Painten became an independent parish in 1542 and remained so until the Catholic Counter-Reformation around 1618. During the Schmalkaldic War (1546/47), Painten was severely damaged and temporarily lost its market rights. In 1576, the market rights were renewed and expanded by the then sovereign, Duke and Count Palatine Philipp Ludwig of Palatinate-Neuburg. He granted the Painten market town the coat of arms upon confirmation of the market rights.

The first documented glassworks in Painten date back to 1630. Count Palatine Wolfgang Wilhelm (Palatinate-Neuburg) commissioned the Venetian Ferrante Morone to establish it. During the Thirty Years' War, only two other glass factories are known in Germany where glass was produced in the Venetian style (à la façon de Venise). The location of Painten was chosen because the lordly Paintner Forest ensured the energy supply for the glass melting. After the first Paintner glassworks went under during the Thirty Years' War, a new one was founded in nearby Rothenbügl in 1665. This glassworks existed until 1878.

During the Thirty Years' War (1618 to 1648), 40 of 81 properties were burned down and only rebuilt decades later.

=== Administrative affiliation ===
Since 1799, the area had been united with the Electorate of Bavaria. Painten possessed a market court with extensive independent rights. As part of the administrative reforms in Bavaria, the municipality of Painten was created by the Municipal Edict of 1818. From 1862 to 1879, Painten belonged to the Hemau District Office and thus to the Bavarian administrative district of Upper Palatinate. With the dissolution of the Hemau District Office on October 1, 1879, Painten became part of the newly formed Parsberg District Office on January 1, 1880. On January 1, 1939, the term "Kreis" (district) was introduced, as was the case everywhere else in the German Empire. Thus, Painten was now part of the Parsberg District. Until 1945, Painten belonged to the administrative district of Lower Bavaria and Upper Palatinate. From 1945, the area was part of the American occupation zone and, from 1949, was assigned to the administrative district of Upper Palatinate.

As part of the administrative reform in Bavaria, the market town of Painten was transferred from the dissolved district of Parsberg to the district of Kelheim and thus to the administrative region of Lower Bavaria in 1972. In 1978, Painten was forcibly incorporated into an administrative community with Ihrlerstein and Essing. On January 1, 1980, the market town of Painten regained its full independence.

=== Incorporations ===
In 1946, part of the dissolved municipality of Rothenbügl was incorporated. In the course of the administrative reform, the municipality of Neulohe (with Maierhofen) was added on 1 January 1972, as well as parts of the municipality of Klingen (Berg, Mantlach, and Netzstall) in 1978. On 1 January 2013, the unincorporated area of Paintner Forst was fully incorporated.

== Politics ==
=== Municipal Council ===
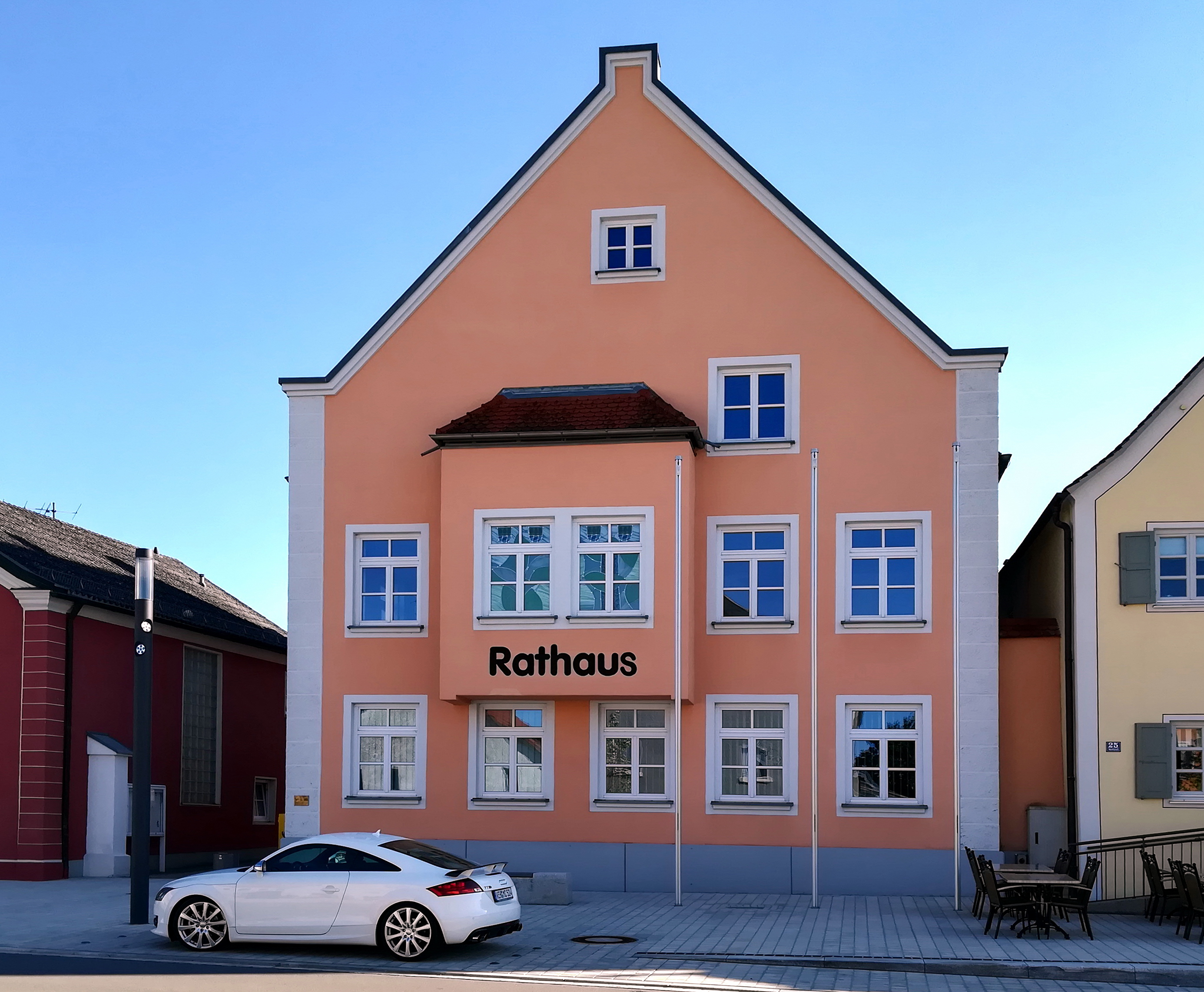
Town hall in Painten

The 2020 municipal council election resulted in the following share of votes and seat distribution:

Party/List	%	Sits
CSU	49,59	7
SPD	37,63	5
Freie Wähler Painten	12,77	2

Michael Raßhofer (CSU) has been mayor since May 2014. He was elected in March 2014 with 50.4% of the vote. and re-elected in 2020 with 94.55% of the vote.

The only political youth organization in Painten is the Junge Union Painten.

== Coat of arms ==
Coat of arms

Blazon reference: "Divided; above in gold next to each other three green deciduous trees, below seven slanting silver and blue diamonds."

== Economy and infrastructure ==
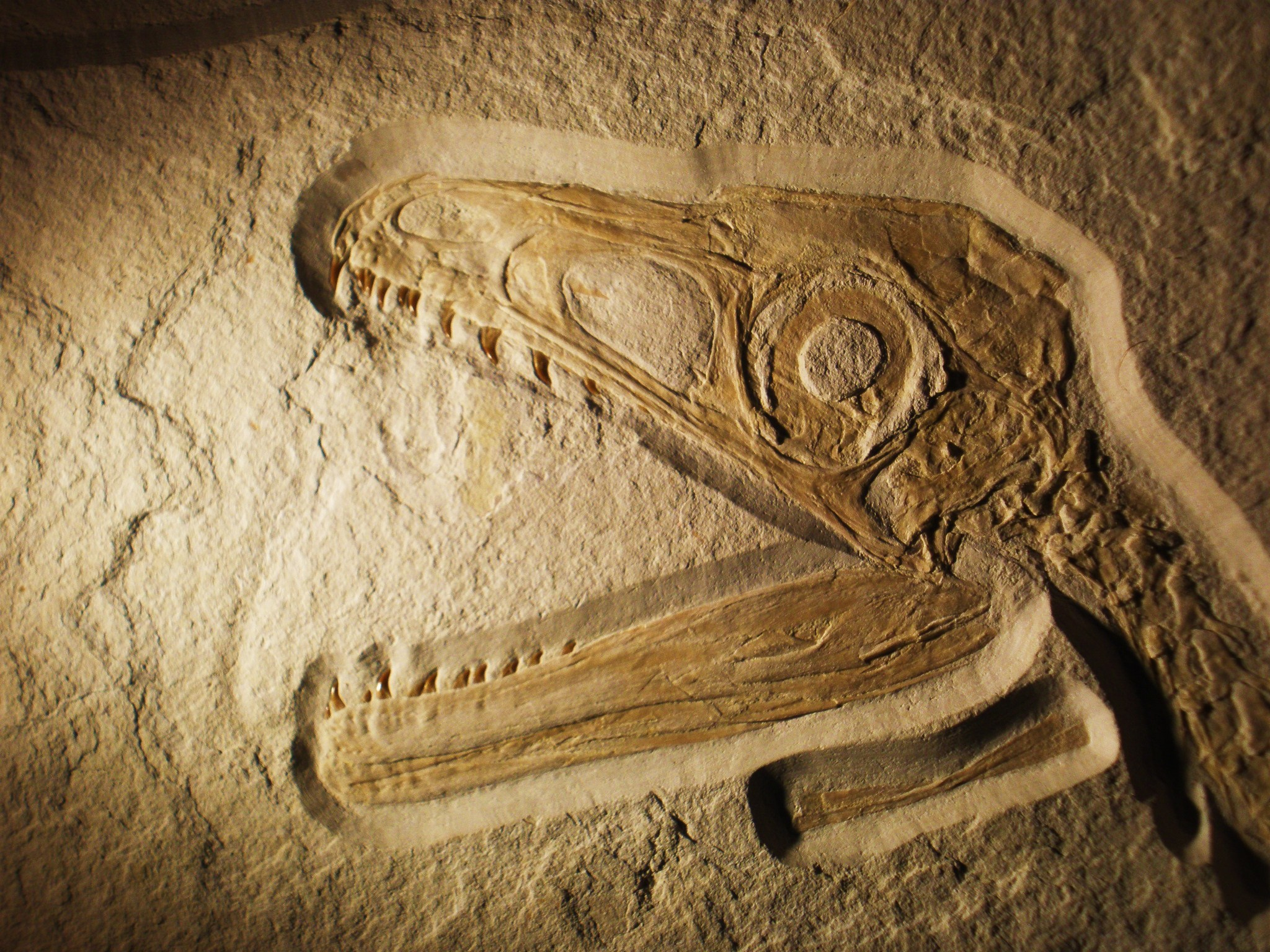
Head skeleton of Sciurumimus. The unusual dentition for a predatory dinosaur from the group Tetanurae is clearly visible here.

=== Economy including agriculture and forestry ===
According to official statistics, in 2020 there were no employees subject to social insurance contributions at their place of work in agriculture and forestry, 386 in manufacturing, and 42 in trade and transport. In other economic sectors, this figure was 91. There were 835 employees subject to social insurance contributions at their place of residence. There were two companies in the manufacturing sector and four in the construction sector. In addition, in 2016 there were 19 agricultural holdings with a total agricultural area of 389 hectares, of which 314 hectares were arable land.

=== Limestone mining ===
The quarry near Painten currently covers an area of 47.7 hectares. The site is used by the RYGOL Baustoffwerk company. An expansion of an additional 18.7 hectares is intended to secure the lime works' existence for another 35 years. RYGOL Baustoffwerk is now one of the leading manufacturers of dry mortars in Bavaria.

During excavations on the quarry site in 2009 or 2010, an almost completely preserved skeleton of the predatory dinosaur Sciurumimus was discovered. The fossil is approximately 151 million years old and one of the best-preserved dinosaur fossils in the world. It is on permanent loan to the Bürgermeister-Müller-Museum paleontology in Solnhofen.

=== Education ===
In 2021, the following facilities existed:

- Two daycare centers: 114 kindergarten places, 97 children
- One elementary school: four teachers, 74 students
