= Bundesstraße 22 =

Federal highway in Germany

B 22
- Bundesstraße 22

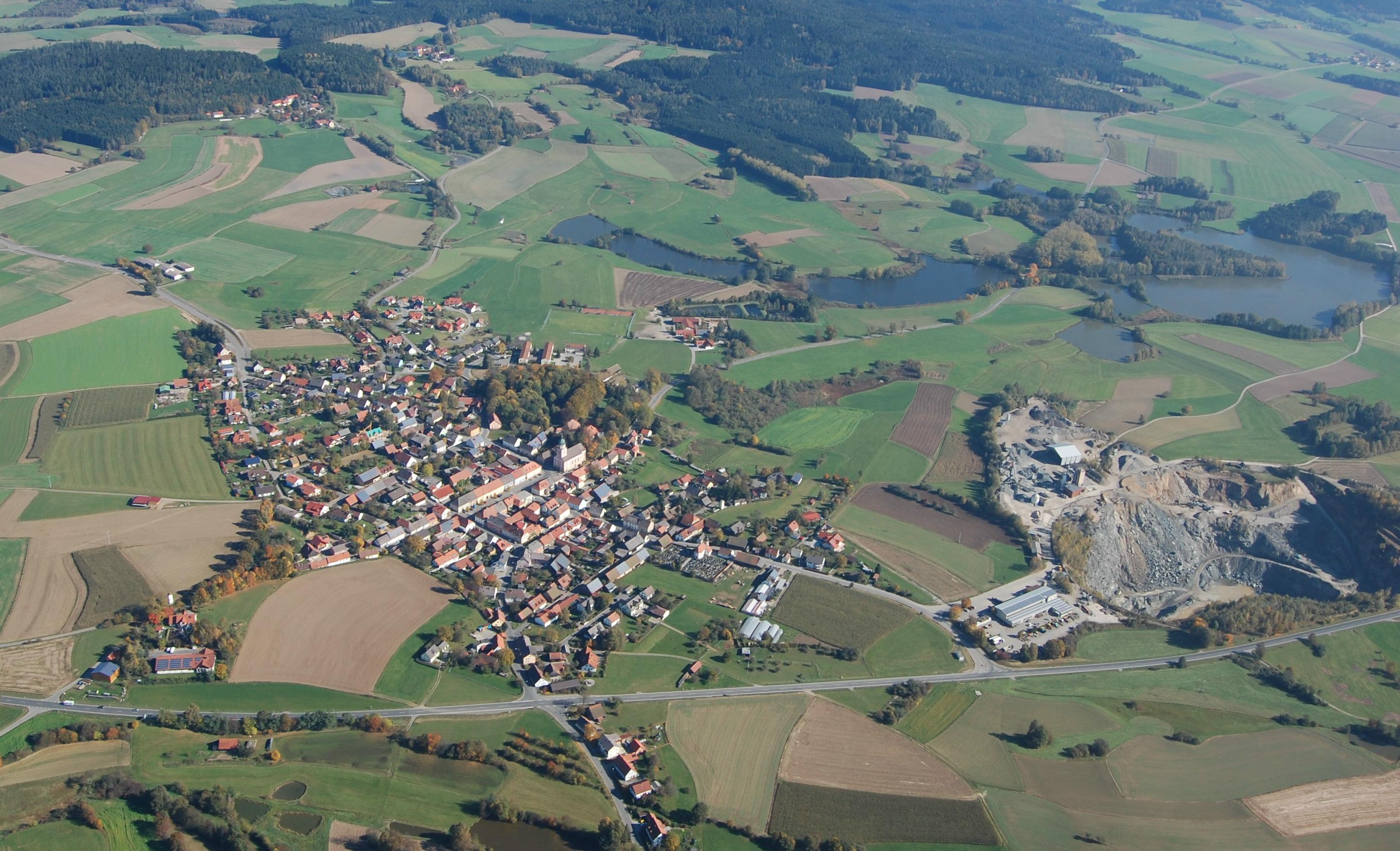

Route information
- Length: 288 km (179 mi)

Major junctions
- West end: Würzburg
- East end: Cham

Location
- Country: Germany
- States: Bavaria

Highway system
- Roads in Germany; Autobahns; List; Federal; List; State; E-roads

Bundesstraße 22 (abbreviated to B 22) is a German federal highway that runs from Würzburg (branching off the B 8 near Rottendorf) in Lower Franconia, through the Upper Franconian cities of Bamberg and Bayreuth and the Upper Palatine town of Weiden, to Cham. The highway acts as a bypass for the Upper Franconian villages of Seybothenreuth and Speichersdorf as well as the Upper Palatine towns of Kemnath, Erbendorf, Oberviechtach and Rötz, running past Cham (Oberpfalz), where it joins the B 20 and B 85 highways.

Between Erbendorf and Cham the B 22 is part of the Bavarian Ostmark Road, that was completed in 1938.

== History ==
=== Origins ===
The Würzburg prince-bishop, Adam Friedrich von Seinsheim, was appointed as Bishop of Würzburg in 1755 and also Bishop of Bamberg in 1757. He encouraged the construction of roads in his two dioceses and had the road between his residence cities of Würzburg and Bamberg upgraded to a long-distance country road or Chaussee. The road from Bamberg to Bayreuth was also upgraded to a Chaussee on the section to Würgau.

=== Former routes and designations ===
Reichsstraße 22 (Reich highway no. 22) was established in 1932, branching from Reichsstraße 15 from Mitterteich to Eger. Later, this route became part of Bundesstraße 299.

Not until 1937 was the well-constructed country road between Würzburg, Bamberg, and Bayreuth incorporated into the Reichsstraße network as Reichsstraße 22. In 1937, this Reichsstraße only went as far as Weiden. Its condition east of Bayreuth was described as dangerously poor in 1938.

The Bavarian Ostmark Road was completed in 1938. For military-strategic reasons, it was built parallel to the then German-Czechoslovak border and was the first north-south route through the Upper Palatine Forest that was suitable for motor vehicles. Between Weiden and Erbendorf, it replaced the previous Reichsstraße.

=== Alterations ===
In 1959, a new bridge over the River Main was built at Stadtschwarzach for the B 22.

The section between the junction at Scheßlitz and the Bamberg crossroads was replaced by the A 70 motorway. From there, it runs on the A 73 to the junction of Bamberg Süd. The roadbed of the old B 22 from Bamberg to Scheßlitz was downgraded and redesignated as state highway (Staatsstraße) 2190.

The stretch from Bundesstraße 8 to Schwarzach was downgraded to state highway 2450 in 2016. Since then, the B 22 begins at the Kitzingen-Schwarzach junction of the A 3 motorway and interrupts state highway 2271.

=== Future Plans ===
The bypass around Eckersdorf is included in the Federal Transport Infrastructure Plan 2030 as a priority need. The bypasses for Düllstadt, Reupelsdorf, Stadelschwarzach, Mönchsambach, and Wirbenz are listed under further needs.

== Sources ==
- Thomas Gunzelmann: Ein erhaltener Abschnitt einer fürstbischöflich-bambergischen Chaussee bei Unterleiterbach. In: Dietmar Absch und Günter Dippold: Dorf-Leben. Politik, Glaube und Kultur im Wandel. 1200 Jahre Unterleiterbach, S. 176–178.
- Josef Forster: Auf und Ab durch das Grenzland. Bundesstraße 22 eine der schönsten Panoramastrecken in Deutschland. In: Heimatzeitung Der neue Tag vom 6. Oktober 2004 oder im oberpfalznetz.de, Netzcode: 10622925.
- Josef Forster: Panoramatour Ostmarkstraße. In: Heimatkundlicher Arbeitskreis Vohenstrauß: Streifzüge 26/2004. S. 38–42.

== See also ==
- List of federal highways in Germany
