= Kirdorf =

Kirdorf is a German surname, a spelling cariant of the word "Kirchdorf". Notable people with the surname include:

- Emil Kirdorf (8 April 1847 – 13 July 1938) was a German industrialist
- Gustav Kastner-Kirdorf (2 February 1881 – 4 May 1945) was a Prussian military officer and later a German pilot and general
- Thomas Kirdorf (born 1954) is a German screenwriter and radio play author .
