= Kirchdorf (disambiguation) =

Many places in German-speaking countries are called Kirchdorf (church village):

== Germany ==
- Baden-Württemberg
  - Kirchdorf an der Iller, a municipality in the district of Biberach
- Bavaria
  - Kirchdorf am Haunpold, former name of the municipality of Bruckmühl
  - Kirchdorf am Inn, in the district of Rottal-Inn
    - Kirchdorf Wildcats, an American football team from Kirchdorf am Inn
  - Kirchdorf am Inn (Raubling), former name of the municipality of Raubling
  - Kirchdorf an der Amper, a municipality in the district of Freising
  - Kirchdorf im Wald, a municipality in the district of Regen
  - Kirchdorf, Lower Bavaria, a municipality in the district of Kelheim
  - Kirchdorf, Upper Bavaria, a municipality in the district of Mühldorf
- Hamburg
  - Kirchdorf Süd in Hamburg-Wilhelmsburg
- Lower Saxony
  - Kirchdorf, Lower Saxony, a municipality in the district of Diepholz
  - Kirchdorf (Samtgemeinde), a Samtgemeinde in the district of Diepholz
  - Kirchdorf (Deister), a part of the city of Barsinghausen
- Mecklenburg-Vorpommern
  - Kirchdorf, Mecklenburg-Vorpommern, a municipality in the district Vorpommern-Rügen
  - Kirchdorf (Poel), village on the island Poel

== Poland ==
- Kirchdorf, the German name for Stróżewo, Greater Poland Voivodeship, in western Poland

== Austria ==
- Kirchdorf (Amstetten)
- Kirchdorf am Inn, Upper Austria
- Kirchdorf an der Krems
- Kirchdorf in Tirol

== Slovakia ==
- Spišské Podhradie, also known as Kirchdorf amongst German-speakers.

== Switzerland ==
- Kirchdorf, Switzerland, a municipality in the canton of Bern
- Kirchdorf, Aargau, part of Obersiggenthal
