= German-Czech Chamber of Industry and Commerce =

Czech organisation

The German-Czech Chamber of Industry and Commerce (DTIHK) is located in Prague and belongs to the worldwide network of German Chambers of Commerce Abroad. The Association of German Chambers of Industry and Commerce is the respective umbrella organisation. The DTIHK employs some 40 people and has about 670 voluntary members which makes it the largest bilateral Chamber of Commerce Abroad in the Czech Republic. AHK Services s.r.o. is the chambers service society and a wholly owned subsidiary of the DTIHK.

== History ==
In 1993 the DTIHK was founded as replacement of the Delegation of the German Economy in the Czech Republic. In the beginning, the chamber had 191 member companies. This number doubled until 1998. In the following year, the DTIHK moved to their new offices at Wenceslas Square. In 2010, the service society AHK Services s.r.o. was founded as a wholly owned subsidiary. One year later, the DTIHK signed a cooperation agreement to open a shared regional office in Plzeň with the IHK Regensburg for Upper Palatinate/Kehlheim. In 2013, the chamber celebrated its 20th anniversary.

== Organisation ==
The DTIHK's top body is the General Assembly, which meets once a year and elects eleven board members. Current president of the DTIHK is Milan Šlachta (Representative of Bosch Group in the Czech Republic and Slovakia). The chamber's operational business is led by the CEO and board member Bernard Bauer.

== Functions ==
The DTIHK combines Czech with German business and promotes the politico-economic collaboration of both countries. By means of its subsidiary AHK Services s.r.o., the chamber can also advise and support companies with multiple services when they enter the market in the Czech Republic and Germany. On behalf of the Federal Ministry for Economic Affairs and Energy, the DTIHK offers a broad network for German and Czech companies on-site, and represents their interests before politics and the public.

Official Representation of the German Economy

The Chambers of Commerce Abroad are the main actors of German foreign trade promotion on behalf of the federal Republic of Germany. They represent German economic interests in their respective host countries, inform about and promote the business location Germany.

Member-based Organisation

The Chambers of Commerce Abroad connect companies active in bilateral economic relations. Its members add to the chambers impact when communicating with politics, economy and administration about bilateral economic relations. They regularly meet at different events, such as Jour Fixes, Speed Business Meetings, the DTIHK summer party or the Oktoberfest in Prague.

Service Provider for Companies

German and Czech companies obtain support from DTIHK's subsidiary AHK Services s.r.o. when entering the respective country's market. Those services ma take the form of:

market & sales consultation | establishment of a company | investment consulting & legal advice | tax consulting & accounting | HR services | education & training | fair services | advertising & communication | industry-specific consulting

== Annual themes & TopTopics ==
The DTIHK follows the latest trends in both countries and actively and publicly addresses topics that have greater potential for the German-Czech business relations with their TopTopic (previously: annual theme).

- Energy Efficiency & Mobility (2011)
- Together for Skilled Workers and Innovation (2012)
- 20 years of German-Czech Business Relations - 20 years of DTIHK (2013)
- Research & Development - Targeting the Future (2014)
- Industry 4.0 – Shaping the rEvolution (2015)
- Connect Visions to Solutions – Startup Award (from 2016)
- Intelligent Infrastructure (2017 and 2018)
- Artificial Intelligence (2019)
- Sustainability & platform #PartnersForSustainability (2020 and 2021)

== Representations ==
The DTIHK represents several associations and institutions in the Czech Republic and in Germany:

exhibition corporations	representations of states	further representations
Brno Exhibition Center; Trade Fair Center Berlin; Nuremberg International Toy Fair	delegation of the Bavarian industry; in the Czech Republic: representative for the Saxon industry; on behalf of the Saxony Economic Development	German National Tourist Board; Germany Trade and Invest; Bayern Handwerk International; Landbell AG
