= Mainburg (Verwaltungsgemeinschaft) =

- Verwaltungsgemeinschaft
- Location of Mainburg within Kelheim district
- Interactive map of Mainburg
- Location within Germany Location within Bavaria
- Coordinates: 48°39′N 11°47′E
- Country: Germany
- State: Bavaria
- Admin. region: Lower Bavaria
- District: Kelheim
- Seat: Mainburg
- Subdivisions: 4 municipalities

Area
  - Total: 133.13 km^{2} (51.40 sq mi)

Population (2025-12-31)
  - Total: 7,243
  - Density: 54.41/km^{2} (140.9/sq mi)
- Time zone: UTC+01:00 (CET)
  - Summer (DST): UTC+02:00 (CEST)
- Website: www.vg-mainburg.de

Mainburg is a Verwaltungsgemeinschaft (municipal association) in the district of Kelheim in Bavaria, Germany. Its seat is in Mainburg, itself not part of the Verwaltungsgemeinschaft.

It consists of the following municipalities:

1. Aiglsbach
2. Attenhofen
3. Elsendorf
4. Volkenschwand
