= B85 =

B85 may refer to:

- Bundesstraße 85, a German road
- Rosental Straße, an Austrian road
- Sicilian Defence, Scheveningen Variation, according to the list of chess openings
