= Herrngiersdorf =

- Municipality
- Coat of arms

- Location of Herrngiersdorf within Kelheim district
- Interactive map of Herrngiersdorf
- Location within Germany Location within Bavaria
- Coordinates: 48°48′N 12°4′E
- Country: Germany
- State: Bavaria
- Admin. region: Niederbayern
- District: Kelheim
- Municipal assoc.: Langquaid

Area
  - Total: 25.09 km^{2} (9.69 sq mi)
- Elevation: 405 m (1,329 ft)

Population (2025-12-31)
  - Total: 1,438
  - Density: 57.31/km^{2} (148.4/sq mi)
- Time zone: UTC+01:00 (CET)
  - Summer (DST): UTC+02:00 (CEST)
- Postal codes: 84097
- Dialling codes: 09452
- Vehicle registration: KEH
- Website: www.herrngiersdorf.de

Herrngiersdorf is a municipality in the district of Kelheim in Bavaria in Germany. The village is dominated by the large, square Schloss Herrngiersdorf, a brewery.

== Geography ==
Herrngiersdorf is located south of Langquaid and consists of Herrngiersdorf, Sandsbach, Semerskirchen, and Sittelsdorf.

== Gallery ==
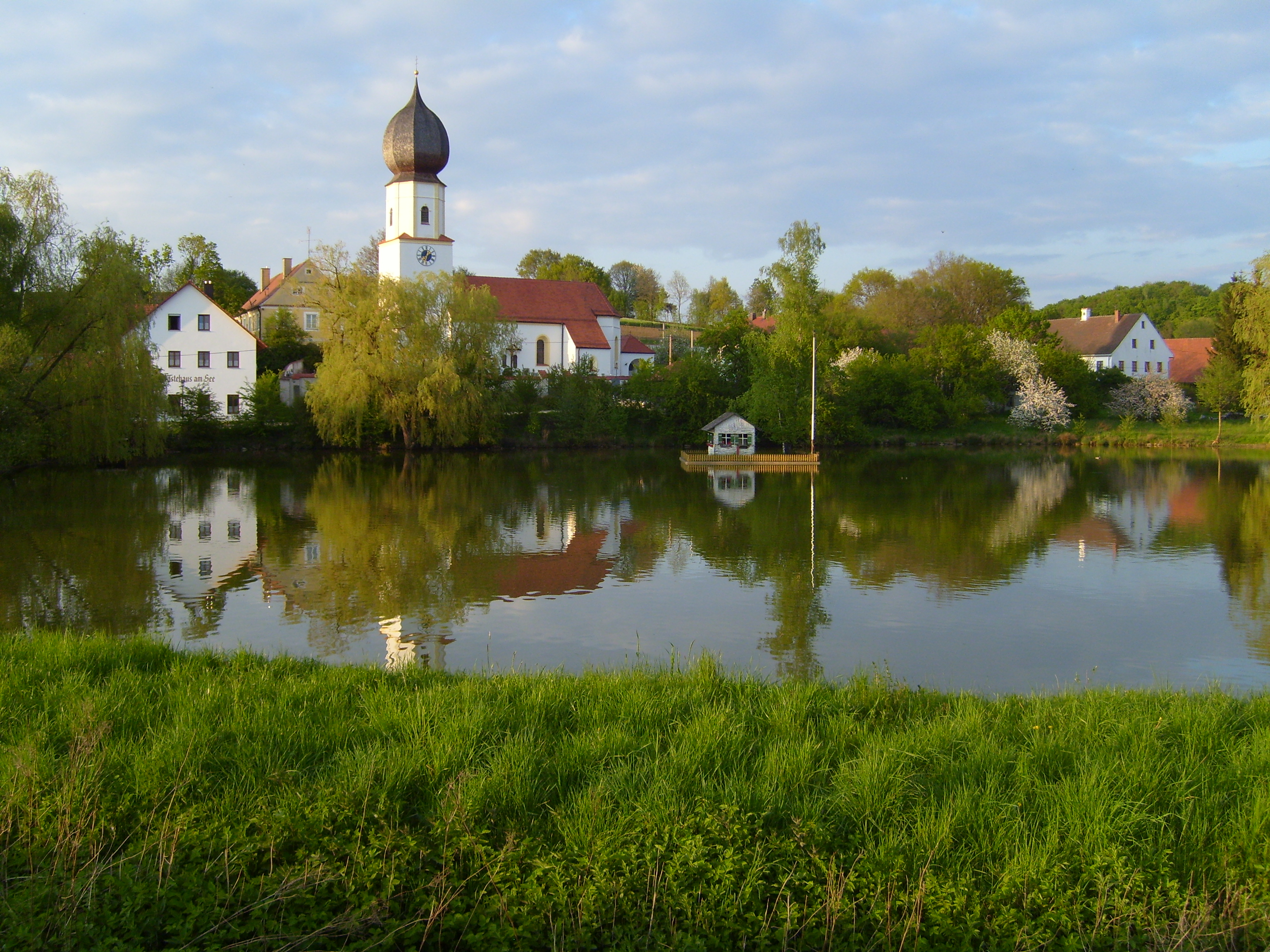
Lake at Semerskirchen

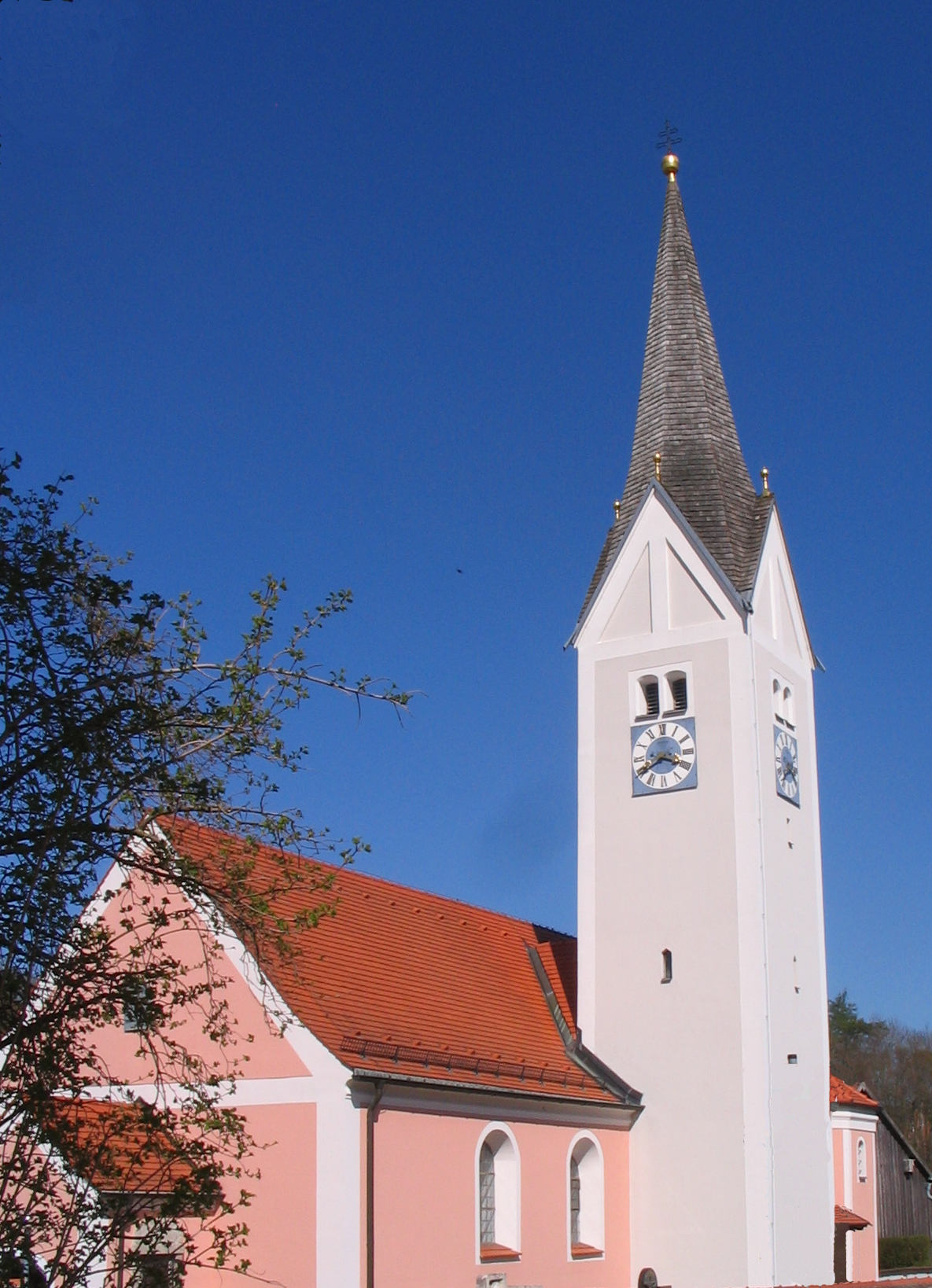
St. Martin's church

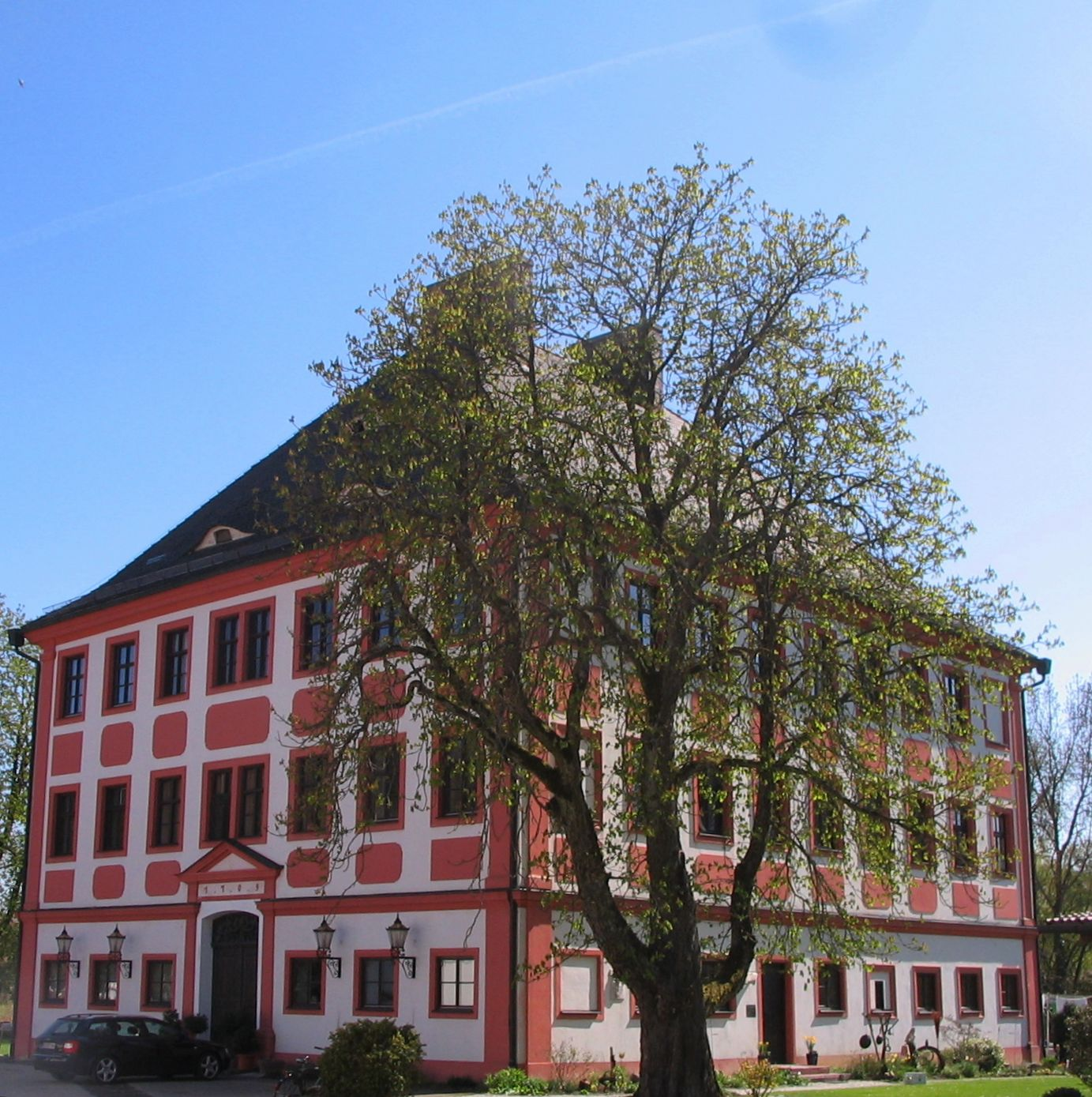
Schloss Herrngiersdorf
