= Biburg =

- Municipality
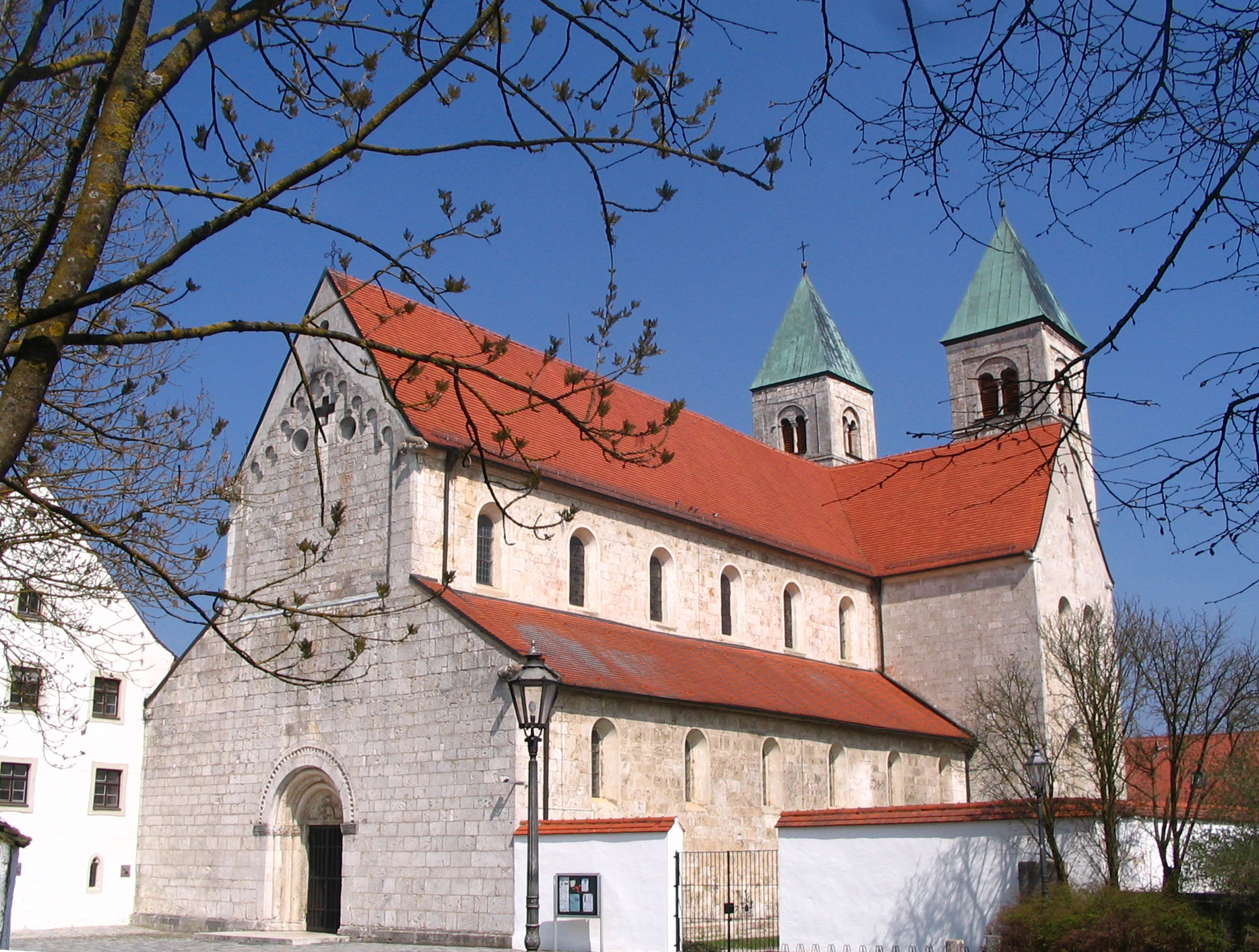
- Former monastery Church of Immaculate Mary

- Coat of arms

- Location of Biburg within Kelheim district
- Interactive map of Biburg
- Location within Germany Location within Bavaria
- Coordinates: 48°48′N 11°52′E
- Country: Germany
- State: Bavaria
- Admin. region: Niederbayern
- District: Kelheim
- Municipal assoc.: Siegenburg

Government
  - Mayor (2020–26): Bettina Danner

Area
  - Total: 14.2 km^{2} (5.5 sq mi)
- Elevation: 376 m (1,234 ft)

Population (2025-12-31)
  - Total: 1,381
  - Density: 97.3/km^{2} (252/sq mi)
- Time zone: UTC+01:00 (CET)
  - Summer (DST): UTC+02:00 (CEST)
- Postal codes: 93354
- Dialling codes: 09444 (Dürnhart, Perka) 09443 (Biburg, Etzenbach, Rappersdorf, Altdürnbuch)
- Vehicle registration: KEH
- Website: www.gemeinde-biburg.de

Biburg (German pronunciation: [ˈbiːbʊʁk]) is a municipality in the district of Kelheim in Bavaria in Germany.
