= Langquaid (Verwaltungsgemeinschaft) =

- Verwaltungsgemeinschaft
- Location of Langquaid within Kelheim district
- Interactive map of Langquaid
- Location within Germany Location within Bavaria
- Coordinates: 48°49′N 12°03′E
- Country: Germany
- State: Bavaria
- Admin. region: Lower Bavaria
- District: Kelheim
- Seat: Langquaid
- Subdivisions: 3 municipalities

Area
  - Total: 116.44 km^{2} (44.96 sq mi)

Population (2025-12-31)
  - Total: 9,684
  - Density: 83.17/km^{2} (215.4/sq mi)
- Time zone: UTC+01:00 (CET)
  - Summer (DST): UTC+02:00 (CEST)

Langquaid is a Verwaltungsgemeinschaft (municipal association) in the district of Kelheim in Bavaria, Germany. Its seat is in Langquaid.

It consists of the following municipalities:

1. Hausen
2. Herrngiersdorf
3. Langquaid
