= Schloss Herrngiersdorf =

- Herrngiersdorf, Bavaria, Germany
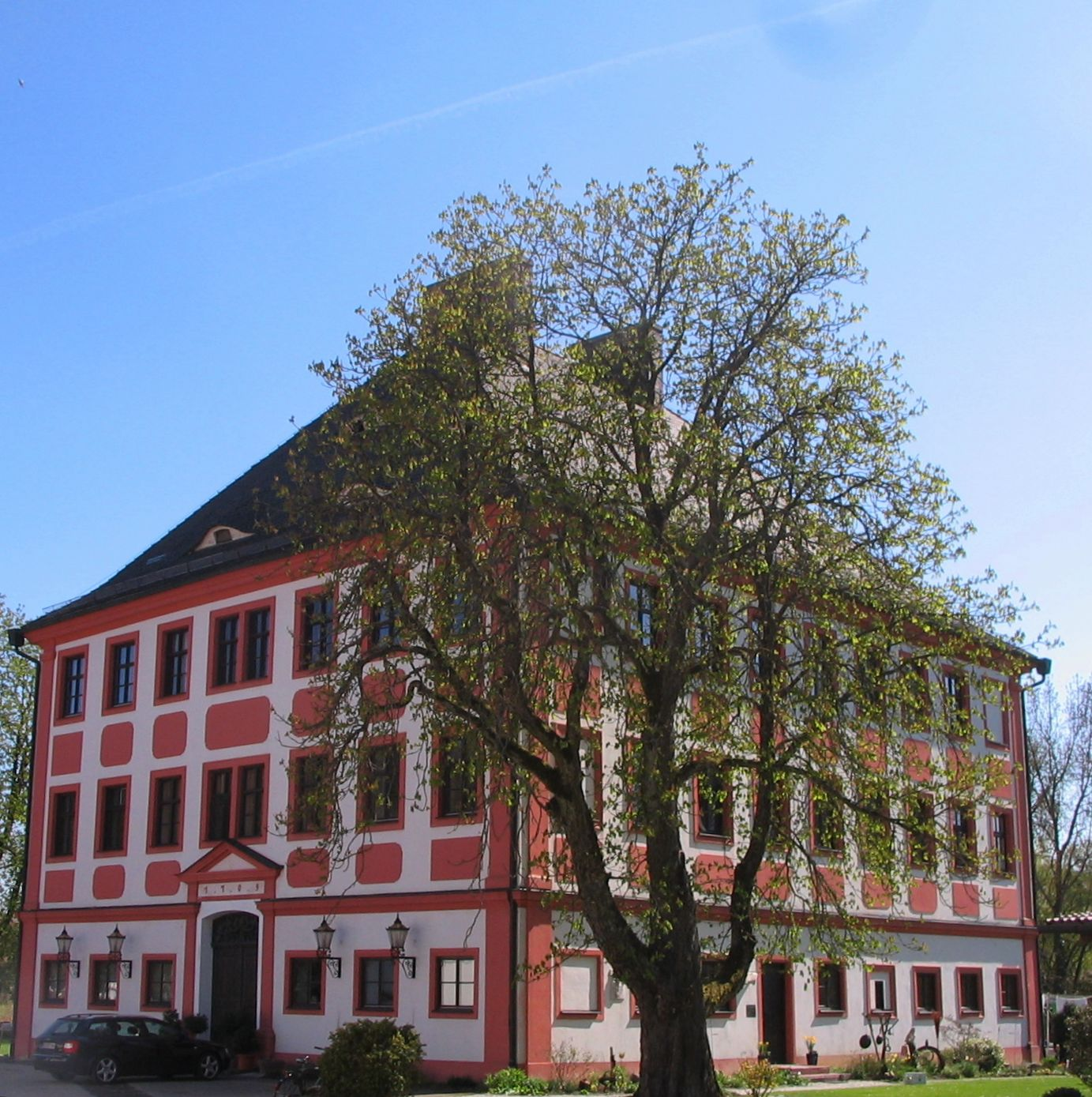
- View of the building

Location
- Location in Bavaria
- Coordinates: 48.790507°N 12.067751°E

Site history
- Built: 1709

Schloss Herrngiersdorf is the building that houses the Schlossbrauerei (Castle brewery) in Herrngiersdorf, Bavaria, Germany. The brewery has its origins in a 12th-century abbey brewery, and describes itself as the oldest privately owned brewery in the world. The building dates to 1709.

== History ==
The Schlossbrauerei in Herrngiersdorf is one of the world's oldest private breweries, and may be the oldest. Its origins are in a brewery founded in 1131 by the Benedictine nuns of Geisenfeld Abbey to supply beer to their extensive possessions in the area. It was able to deliver 20,000 litres (4,400 imp gal; 5,300 US gal) of beer annually. In 1501 the building located at the top of Mühlberg (Mill hill) included a brewery, maltings, mill and blacksmith. Some traces of this building remain today. During the Thirty Years' War (1618–1648) the area around Herrngiersdorf was devastated by the Swedes, but the brewery was not damaged.

The counts of Guggemos owned the town and castle from 1654 to 1822. The brewery building on Mühlberg was abandoned in 1709, replaced with the present building, housing a malthouse and brewhouse. In 1850 the owners built a summer tavern, today's Schlossbräukelle, in the fermentation and storage cellar. In 1874 the notary Mühlbauer from Rottenburg acquired the agricultural property, including the brewery. He ran into financial difficulties and was forced to auction the property in 1899, when it was acquired by Paul Pausinger. Over the years that followed the brewery was modernized and additional buildings were erected, but was still run by the Pausinger family except for a period during World War II (1939–1945). Management of the brewery was taken over by the sixth generation of the Pausinger family in 1995.

== Gallery ==
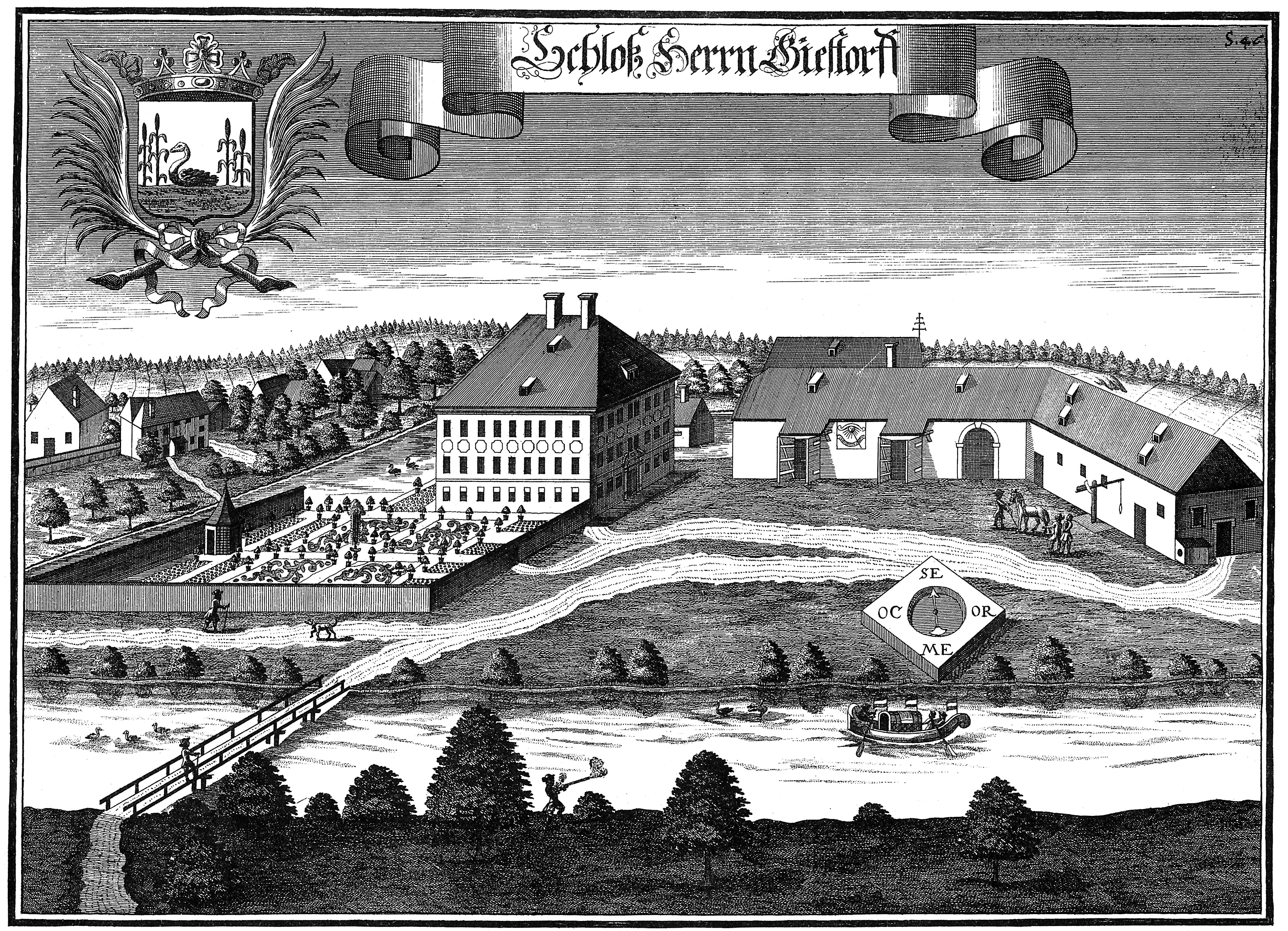
View of the schloss c.1700 by Michael Wening
