= Volkenschwand =

- Municipality
- Coat of arms

- Location of Volkenschwand within Kelheim district
- Interactive map of Volkenschwand
- Location within Germany Location within Bavaria
- Coordinates: 48°36′N 11°53′E
- Country: Germany
- State: Bavaria
- Admin. region: Niederbayern
- District: Kelheim
- Municipal assoc.: Mainburg

Government
  - Mayor (2020–26): Franz Högl

Area
  - Total: 29.24 km^{2} (11.29 sq mi)
- Elevation: 496 m (1,627 ft)

Population (2025-12-31)
  - Total: 1,752
  - Density: 59.92/km^{2} (155.2/sq mi)
- Time zone: UTC+01:00 (CET)
  - Summer (DST): UTC+02:00 (CEST)
- Postal codes: 84106
- Dialling codes: 08754
- Vehicle registration: KEH
- Website: www.volkenschwand.de

Volkenschwand is a municipality in the district of Kelheim in Bavaria in Germany.
