= Wildenberg =

- Municipality
- Coat of arms

- Location of Wildenberg within Kelheim district
- Interactive map of Wildenberg
- Location within Germany Location within Bavaria
- Coordinates: 48°44′N 11°55′E
- Country: Germany
- State: Bavaria
- Admin. region: Niederbayern
- District: Kelheim
- Municipal assoc.: Siegenburg

Government
  - Mayor (2020–26): Winfried Roßbauer (CSU)

Area
  - Total: 18.16 km^{2} (7.01 sq mi)
- Elevation: 430 m (1,410 ft)

Population (2025-12-31)
  - Total: 1,388
  - Density: 76.43/km^{2} (198.0/sq mi)
- Time zone: UTC+01:00 (CET)
  - Summer (DST): UTC+02:00 (CEST)
- Postal codes: 93359
- Dialling codes: 09444
- Vehicle registration: KEH
- Website: www.wildenberg.de

Wildenberg (German pronunciation: [ˈvɪldn̩ˌbɛʁk]) is a municipality in the district of Kelheim in Bavaria, Germany.

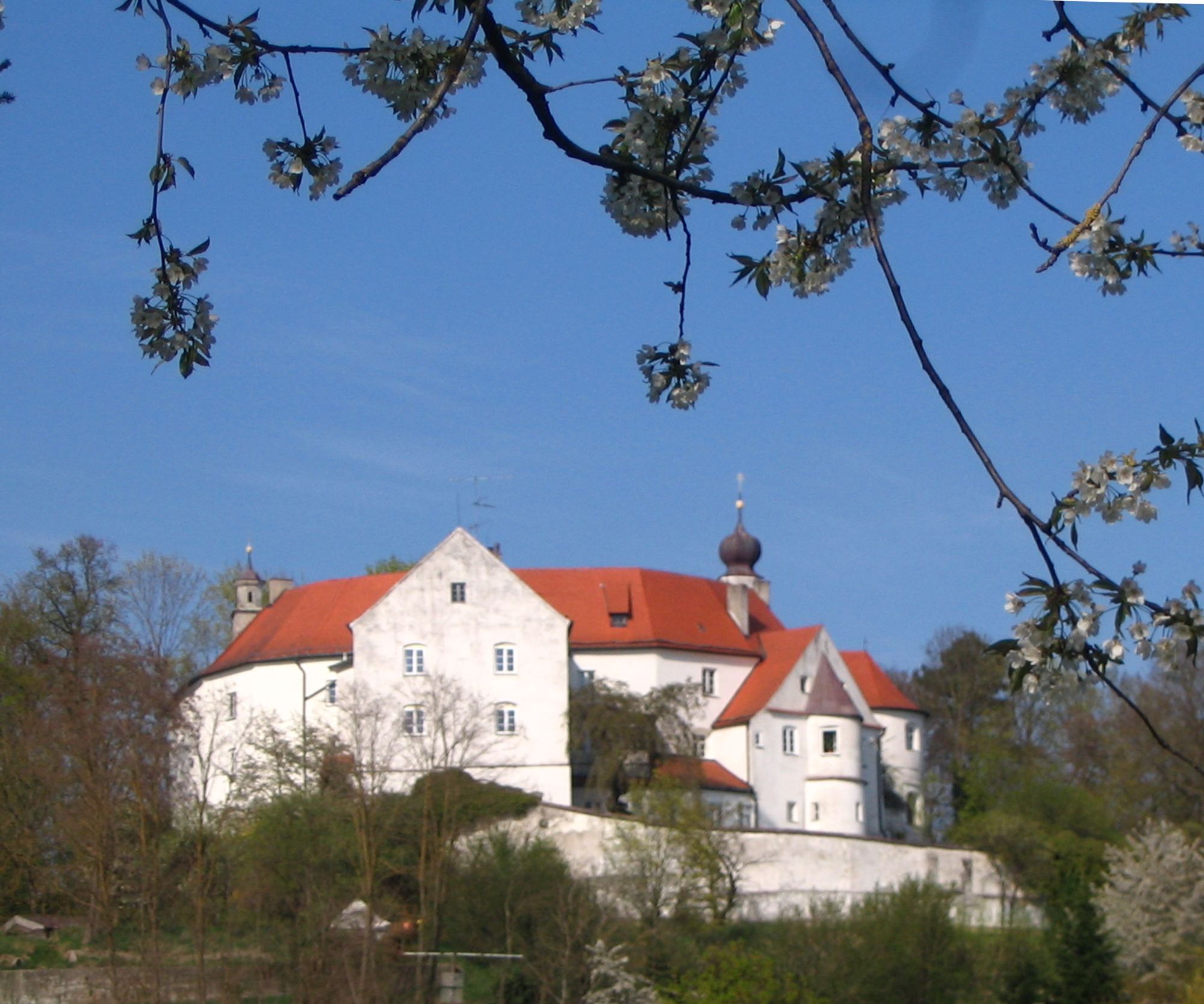
Wildenberg Castle in Wildenberg

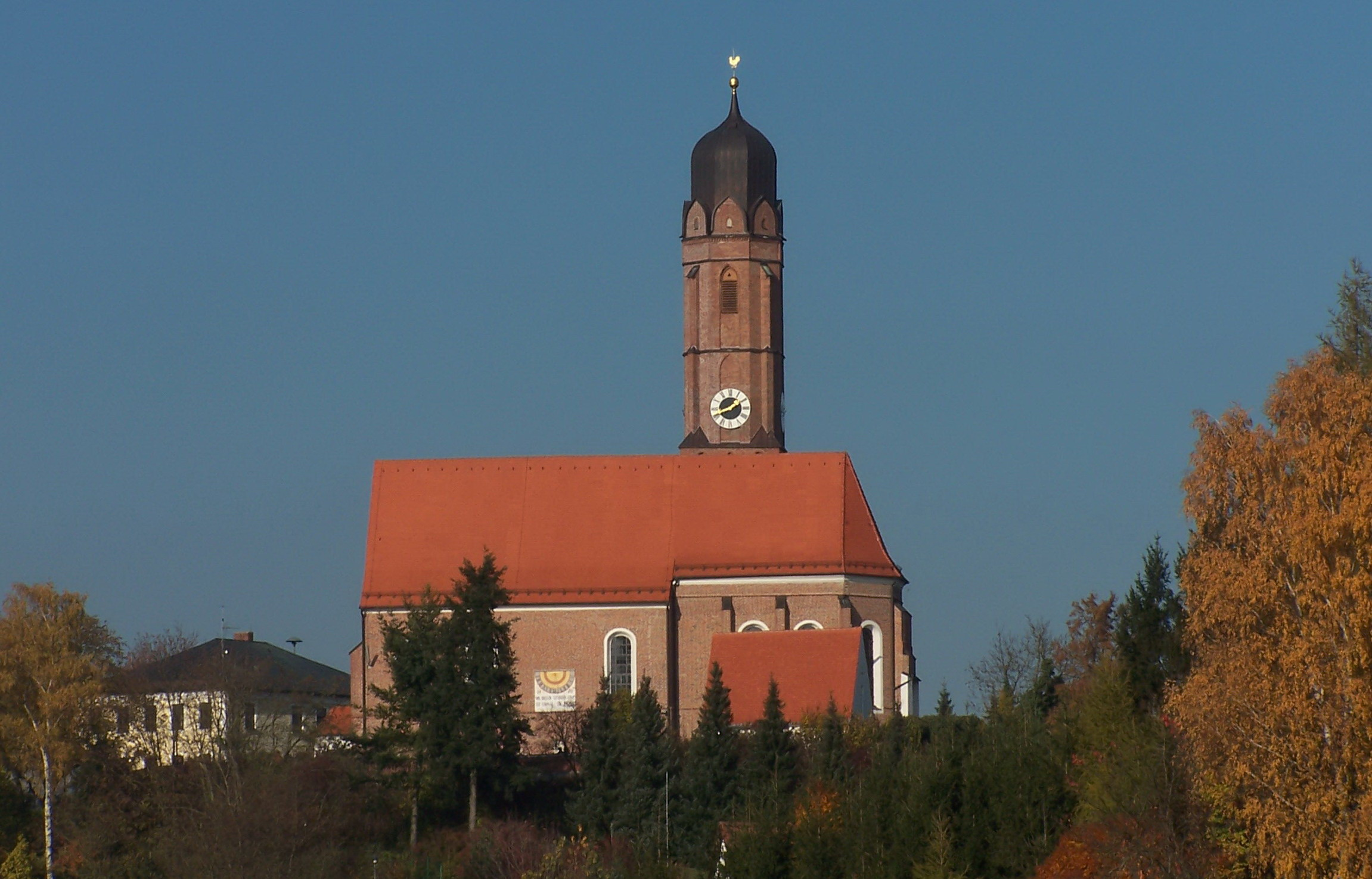
Gothic and Baroque brick church in the joined village of Pürkwang
