= Bundesstraße 15 =

Federal highway in Germany

B 15
- Bundesstraße 15

Route information
- Length: 380 km (240 mi)

Location
- Country: Germany
- States: Bavaria

Highway system
- Roads in Germany; Autobahns; List; Federal; List; State; E-roads

The Bundesstraße 15 is a federal highway in Germany. It is located entirely within the state of Bavaria, runs in an almost perfect north-south direction, and runs from the A 9 north of Hof to the Inntal.

== History ==
=== Previous routes and names ===
Today's Bundesstraße 15 has its origins in the Reichsstraße 15. The Reichsstraßen were created in 1934 for the German Reich. The R 15 began in Gera and went through Schleiz, Hof, Wunsiedel and Marktredwitz to Mitterteich. From Mitterteich, it followed today's route to the connection to the Inntalautobahn near Rosenheim. From there, the R 15 went through Brannenburg and Oberaudorf to the border at Kiefersfelden. After the Anschluss in 1938, the R 15 was extended via Kufstein to Wörgl. In Kufstein, an auxiliary road, R 15a, branched off and went to the R 31 near Ellmau.

In 1941, the path of the R 15 north of Mitterteich was changed. Now, the R 15 began in the Bohemian town of Karlsbad and traveled through Falkenau (Sokolov), Eger (Cheb), and Waldsassen to Mitterteich and from then on, the same path as before. The part from Gera to Hof was given to the R 2, and the part from Hof to Mitterteich was given the designation of R 303.

After World War II, the path of the road was changed again. The B 15 now began in Hof and led over Selb and Marktredwitz to Mitterteich, and then south to the Austrian border as before. The part of the road between Eger and Mitterteich that was still within Germany became part of B 299.
