= Ihrlerstein (Verwaltungsgemeinschaft) =

- Verwaltungsgemeinschaft
- Location of Ihrlerstein within Kelheim district
- Interactive map of Ihrlerstein
- Location within Germany Location within Bavaria
- Coordinates: 48°56′N 11°52′E
- Country: Germany
- State: Bavaria
- Admin. region: Lower Bavaria
- District: Kelheim
- Seat: Ihrlerstein
- Subdivisions: 2 municipalities

Area
  - Total: 40.35 km^{2} (15.58 sq mi)

Population (2025-12-31)
  - Total: 5,268
  - Density: 130.6/km^{2} (338.1/sq mi)
- Time zone: UTC+01:00 (CET)
  - Summer (DST): UTC+02:00 (CEST)
- Website: www.ihrlerstein.de

Ihrlerstein is a Verwaltungsgemeinschaft (municipal association) in the district of Kelheim in Bavaria, Germany. Its seat is in Ihrlerstein.

It consists of the following municipalities:

1. Essing
2. Ihrlerstein
