= Train, Bavaria =

Train
- Municipality
- Coat of arms

- Location of Train within Kelheim district
- Interactive map of Train
- Location within Germany Location within Bavaria
- Coordinates: 48°44′N 11°50′E
- Country: Germany
- State: Bavaria
- Admin. region: Niederbayern
- District: Kelheim
- Municipal assoc.: Siegenburg

Government
  - Mayor (2020–26): Gerhard Zeitler

Area
  - Total: 10.15 km^{2} (3.92 sq mi)
- Elevation: 422 m (1,385 ft)

Population (2025-12-31)
  - Total: 1,927
  - Density: 189.9/km^{2} (491.7/sq mi)
- Time zone: UTC+01:00 (CET)
  - Summer (DST): UTC+02:00 (CEST)
- Postal codes: 93358
- Dialling codes: 09444
- Vehicle registration: KEH
- Website: www.gemeinde-train.de

Train (German pronunciation: [ˈtʁaɪn]) is one of the many municipalities of Germany in the district of Kelheim in Bavaria in Germany.
