= Attenhofen =

- Municipality
- Coat of arms

- Location of Attenhofen within Kelheim district
- Interactive map of Attenhofen
- Location within Germany Location within Bavaria
- Coordinates: 48°39′N 11°51′E
- Country: Germany
- State: Bavaria
- Admin. region: Niederbayern
- District: Kelheim
- Municipal assoc.: Mainburg

Government
  - Mayor (2020–26): Franz Stiglmaier

Area
  - Total: 31.42 km^{2} (12.13 sq mi)
- Elevation: 465 m (1,526 ft)

Population (2025-12-31)
  - Total: 1,439
  - Density: 45.80/km^{2} (118.6/sq mi)
- Time zone: UTC+01:00 (CET)
  - Summer (DST): UTC+02:00 (CEST)
- Postal codes: 84091
- Dialling codes: 08751
- Vehicle registration: KEH
- Website: www.attenhofen.de

Attenhofen (German pronunciation: [atn̩ˈhoːfn̩]) is a municipality located in the district of Kelheim in Bavaria in Germany.

== History ==
Attenhofen was established as a parish in 1413, according to old sources; the parish church was established sometime after the Battle of Lechfeld in 955.

In 1886, 19 people from Attenhofen took part in the Austro-Prussian War and the Franco-Prussian War.

In 1903, the population of Attenhofen was about 440 people; of those, 435 were Catholic.
