= Siegenburg (Verwaltungsgemeinschaft) =

- Verwaltungsgemeinschaft
- Location of Siegenburg within Kelheim district
- Interactive map of Siegenburg
- Location within Germany Location within Bavaria
- Coordinates: 48°45′N 11°51′E
- Country: Germany
- State: Bavaria
- Admin. region: Lower Bavaria
- District: Kelheim
- Seat: Siegenburg
- Subdivisions: 5 municipalities

Area
  - Total: 86.84 km^{2} (33.53 sq mi)

Population (2025-12-31)
  - Total: 9,822
  - Density: 113.1/km^{2} (292.9/sq mi)
- Time zone: UTC+01:00 (CET)
  - Summer (DST): UTC+02:00 (CEST)
- Website: www.vg-siegenburg.de

Siegenburg is a Verwaltungsgemeinschaft (municipal association) in the district of Kelheim in Bavaria, Germany. Its seat is in Siegenburg.

It consists of the following municipalities:

1. Biburg
2. Kirchdorf
3. Siegenburg
4. Train
5. Wildenberg
