= Elsendorf =

- Municipality
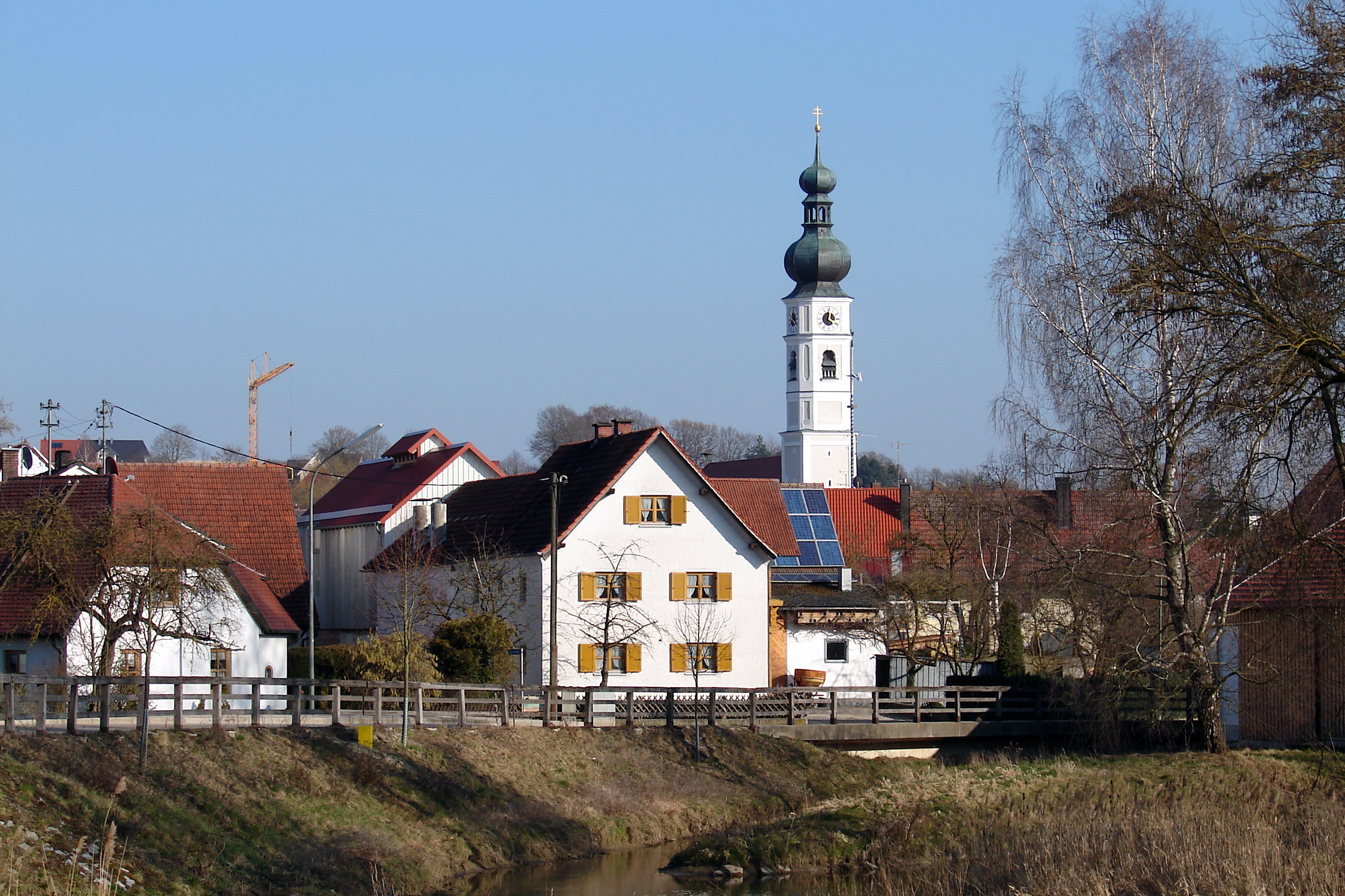
- River Abens and the Church of the Immaculate Conception in Elsendorf

- Coat of arms

- Location of Elsendorf within Kelheim district
- Interactive map of Elsendorf
- Location within Germany Location within Bavaria
- Coordinates: 48°42′N 11°49′E
- Country: Germany
- State: Bavaria
- Admin. region: Niederbayern
- District: Kelheim
- Municipal assoc.: Mainburg

Government
  - Mayor (2020–26): Markus Huber (CSU)

Area
  - Total: 32.63 km^{2} (12.60 sq mi)
- Elevation: 405 m (1,329 ft)

Population (2025-12-31)
  - Total: 2,127
  - Density: 65.19/km^{2} (168.8/sq mi)
- Time zone: UTC+01:00 (CET)
  - Summer (DST): UTC+02:00 (CEST)
- Postal codes: 84094
- Dialling codes: 08753
- Vehicle registration: KEH
- Website: www.elsendorf.de

Elsendorf (German pronunciation: [ˈɛlzn̩ˌdɔʁf]) is a municipality in the district of Kelheim in Bavaria in Germany.
