= Siegenburg =

- Municipality
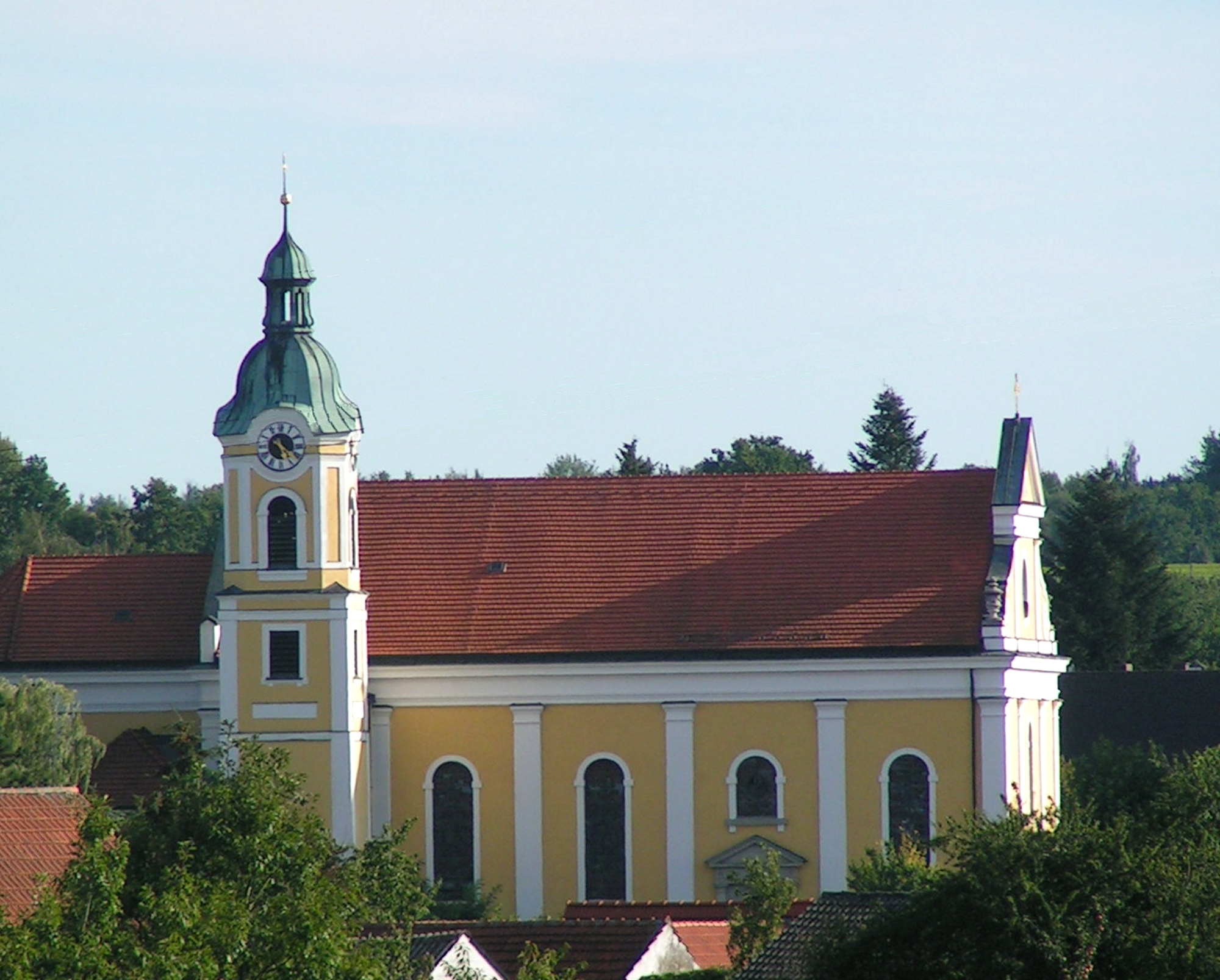
- Saint Nicholas Church

- Coat of arms

- Location of Siegenburg within Kelheim district
- Interactive map of Siegenburg
- Location within Germany Location within Bavaria
- Coordinates: 48°45′N 11°51′E
- Country: Germany
- State: Bavaria
- Admin. region: Niederbayern
- District: Kelheim
- Municipal assoc.: Siegenburg

Government
  - Mayor (2020–26): Johann Bergermeier

Area
  - Total: 27.84 km^{2} (10.75 sq mi)
- Elevation: 392 m (1,286 ft)

Population (2025-12-31)
  - Total: 4,186
  - Density: 150.4/km^{2} (389.4/sq mi)
- Time zone: UTC+01:00 (CET)
  - Summer (DST): UTC+02:00 (CEST)
- Postal codes: 93354
- Dialling codes: 09444
- Vehicle registration: KEH
- Website: www.siegenburg.de

Siegenburg (German pronunciation: [ˈziːɡn̩ˌbʊʁk]) is a municipality in the district of Kelheim in Bavaria in Germany.
