= Ihrlerstein =

- Municipality
- Coat of arms

- Location of Ihrlerstein within Kelheim district
- Interactive map of Ihrlerstein
- Location within Germany Location within Bavaria
- Coordinates: 48°56′N 11°52′E
- Country: Germany
- State: Bavaria
- Admin. region: Niederbayern
- District: Kelheim
- Municipal assoc.: Ihrlerstein

Government
  - Mayor (2020–26): Thomas Krebs (SPD)

Area
  - Total: 23.04 km^{2} (8.90 sq mi)
- Elevation: 482 m (1,581 ft)

Population (2025-12-31)
  - Total: 4,154
  - Density: 180.3/km^{2} (467.0/sq mi)
- Time zone: UTC+01:00 (CET)
  - Summer (DST): UTC+02:00 (CEST)
- Postal codes: 93346
- Dialling codes: 09441
- Vehicle registration: KEH
- Website: www.ihrlerstein.de

Ihrlerstein (German pronunciation: [ˈiːɐ̯lɐʃtaɪn]) is a municipality in the district of Kelheim in Bavaria in Germany.
