= Hausen, Lower Bavaria =

Hausen
- Municipality
- Location of Hausen within Kelheim district
- Interactive map of Hausen
- Location within Germany Location within Bavaria
- Coordinates: 48°51′N 12°0′E
- Country: Germany
- State: Bavaria
- Admin. region: Niederbayern
- District: Kelheim
- Municipal assoc.: Langquaid

Government
  - Mayor (2020–26): Johannes Brunner

Area
  - Total: 34.59 km^{2} (13.36 sq mi)
- Elevation: 384 m (1,260 ft)

Population (2025-12-31)
  - Total: 2,315
  - Density: 66.93/km^{2} (173.3/sq mi)
- Time zone: UTC+01:00 (CET)
  - Summer (DST): UTC+02:00 (CEST)
- Postal codes: 93345
- Dialling codes: 09448
- Vehicle registration: KEH
- Website: www.gemeinde-hausen.de

Hausen (German pronunciation: [ˈhaʊzn̩]) is a municipality in the district of Kelheim in Bavaria in Germany.
