= Thomas Kirdorf =

German screenwriter (born 1954)

Thomas Kirdorf (born 1954) is a German screenwriter and radio play author, best known for his comedy screenplays.

A native of Frankfurt, as of 1995, he used to live on a former vineyard near Mainz.

== Radioplays ==
- 1992: Der Kongreß der Komiker (comedy, with elements of fantasy)
- 1990: Queensfield (science fiction)
- 1987: Ageville (science fiction)
- 1985:Die Zache (science fiction, directed by Bernd Lau)

== Screenplays ==
- Films from the Ein Sommer in … TV film series about trips to various destinations, during which usially people either fall in love or rekindle an old love.
  - 2023: Ein Sommer auf Kreta
  - 2020: A Summer on Mykonos
  - 2019: Ein Sommer in der Toskana
  - 2018: A Summer in Vietnam
  - 2016: Ein Sommer auf Lanzarote
  - 2015: Ein Sommer in Griechenland [A Summmer in Greece]
  - 2014: A Summer in Amsterdam
- 2011: Die göttliche Sophie – Das Findelkind, a sequel to Die göttliche Sophie
- 2009: Die göttliche Sophie [The Divine Sophie], comedy
- 1995: Eine mörderische Liebe [A Murderous Love], TV thriller
- 1992: 5 Rooms, Kitchen, Bathroom, TV film
- 1990: The New Man, comedy

== Awards ==
- 1990: Ernst-Schneider-Preis in Radio category for Aus dem Leben einer Cremedose oder: Wie eine Weltmarke entsteht From the Life of a Cream Jar or: How a Global Brand is Created], about the Nivea brand
- 1985: Radioplay of the Month (November) for radioplay Die Zache
  From Jury's reasoning "With this award, the jury wishes to acknowledge Lau's overall rich and nuanced direction and, secondly, to draw attention to the remarkable radio play debut of a relatively young author, Thomas Kirdorf"... "Kirdorf's radio play, set in the world of electronic entertainment media, succeeds in illustrating that corruption, or rather, corruptibility, is inherent to commercial radio, which obeys only predetermined interests."... "A prominent actor who publicly opposes genetic engineering is, in reality, a secret recipient of royalties and a shareholder in the genetic engineering industry. The radio gag writer, who simultaneously collaborates with the political opposition and is working to expose the actor, is eliminated through intrigue as a disruptive factor and brought into line by the entertainment mafia – in the end, he sits at the station's microphone not as a courageous lone fighter, but as a resigned opportunist."
