= Bad Abbach =

Place in Bavaria, Germany

- Municipality
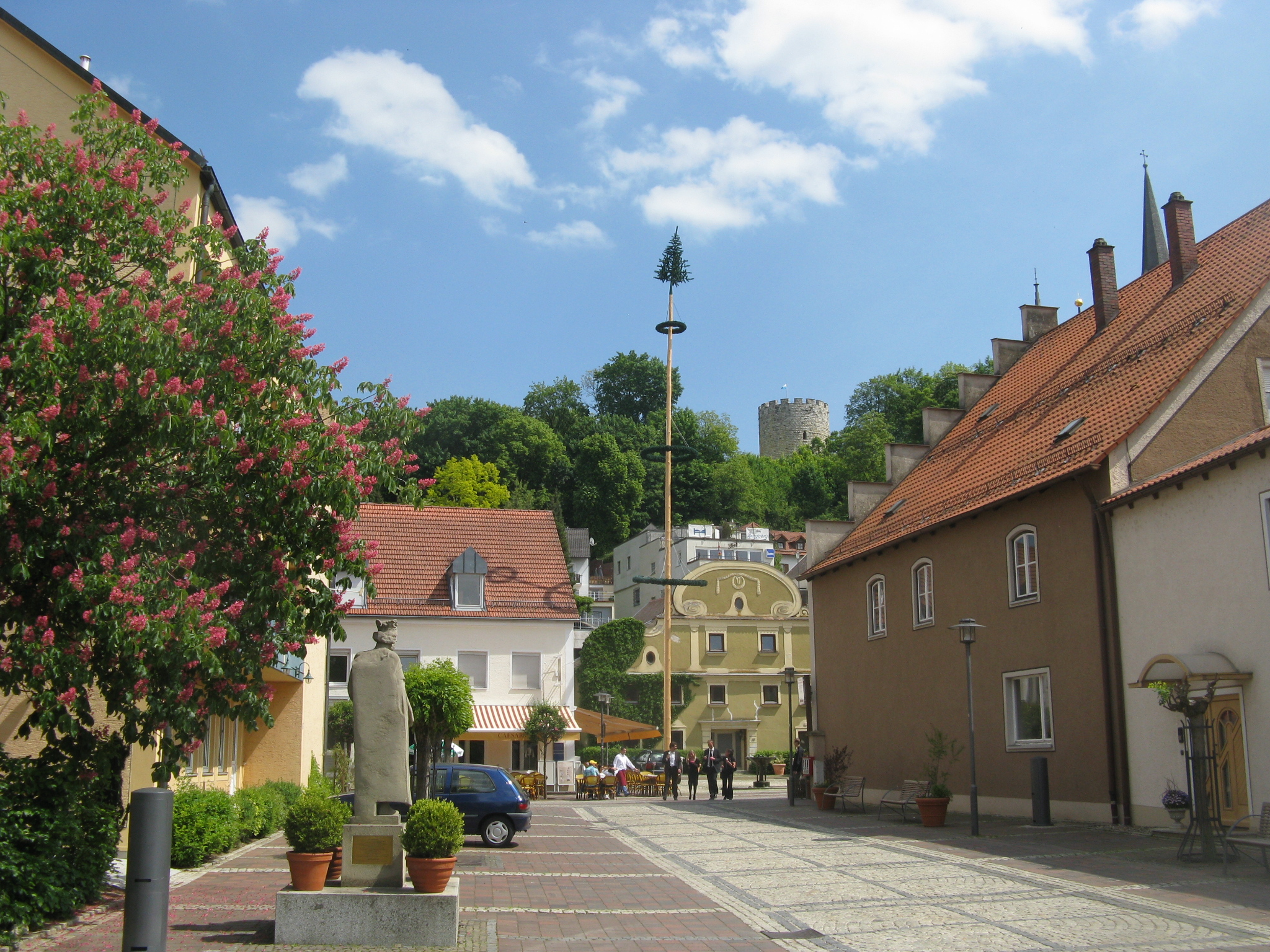
- Town center with the castle

- Coat of arms

- Location of Bad Abbach within Kelheim district
- Interactive map of Bad Abbach
- Location within Germany Location within Bavaria
- Coordinates: 48°56′N 12°03′E
- Country: Germany
- State: Bavaria
- Admin. region: Niederbayern
- District: Kelheim
- Subdivisions: 6 Ortsteile

Government
  - Mayor (2020–26): Benedikt Grünewald (CSU)

Area
  - Total: 55.26 km^{2} (21.34 sq mi)
- Elevation: 371 m (1,217 ft)

Population (2025-12-31)
  - Total: 12,427
  - Density: 224.9/km^{2} (582.4/sq mi)
- Time zone: UTC+01:00 (CET)
  - Summer (DST): UTC+02:00 (CEST)
- Postal codes: 93074–93077
- Dialling codes: 09405
- Vehicle registration: KEH
- Website: www.bad-abbach.de

Bad Abbach (German pronunciation: [baːt ˈabax]) is a municipality in the district of Kelheim, Bavaria, Germany. Due to its sulphurous springs it has the status of a spa town.

Henry II, Holy Roman Emperor was born here in 973 AD.
