= Kirchdorf, Lower Bavaria =

Kirchdorf
- Municipality
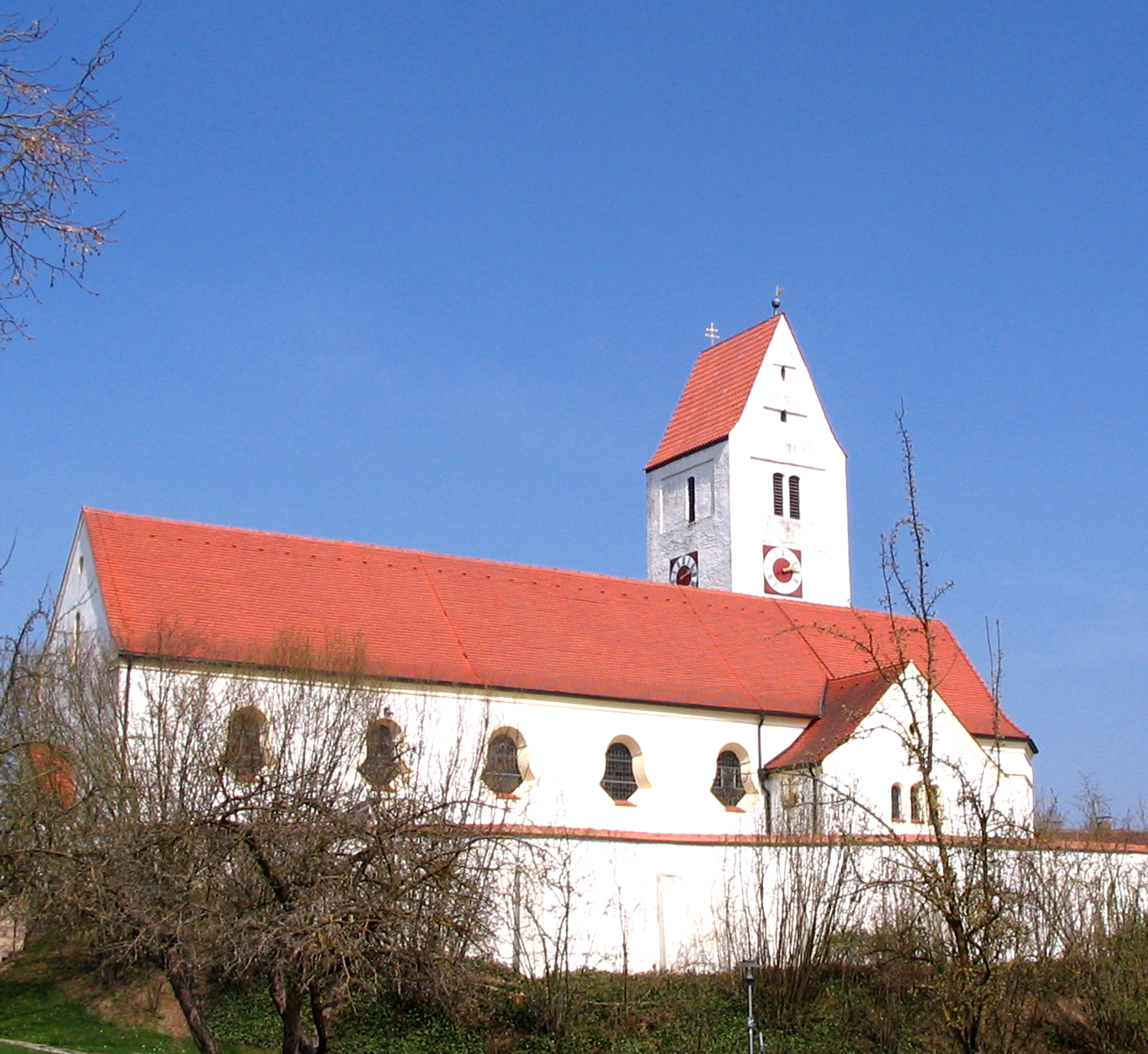
- Church of Saint Elizabeth

- Coat of arms

- Location of Kirchdorf within Kelheim district
- Interactive map of Kirchdorf
- Location within Germany Location within Bavaria
- Coordinates: 48°46′N 11°55′E
- Country: Germany
- State: Bavaria
- Admin. region: Niederbayern
- District: Kelheim
- Municipal assoc.: Siegenburg

Government
  - Mayor (2021–27): Franz Huber

Area
  - Total: 16.49 km^{2} (6.37 sq mi)
- Elevation: 412 m (1,352 ft)

Population (2025-12-31)
  - Total: 940
  - Density: 57/km^{2} (150/sq mi)
- Time zone: UTC+01:00 (CET)
  - Summer (DST): UTC+02:00 (CEST)
- Postal codes: 93348
- Dialling codes: 08783, 09444
- Vehicle registration: KEH
- Website: www.gemeinde-kirchdorf.de

Kirchdorf (German pronunciation: [ˈkɪʁçdɔʁf]) is a municipality in the district of Kelheim in Bavaria in Germany.
