= Essing =

- Municipality
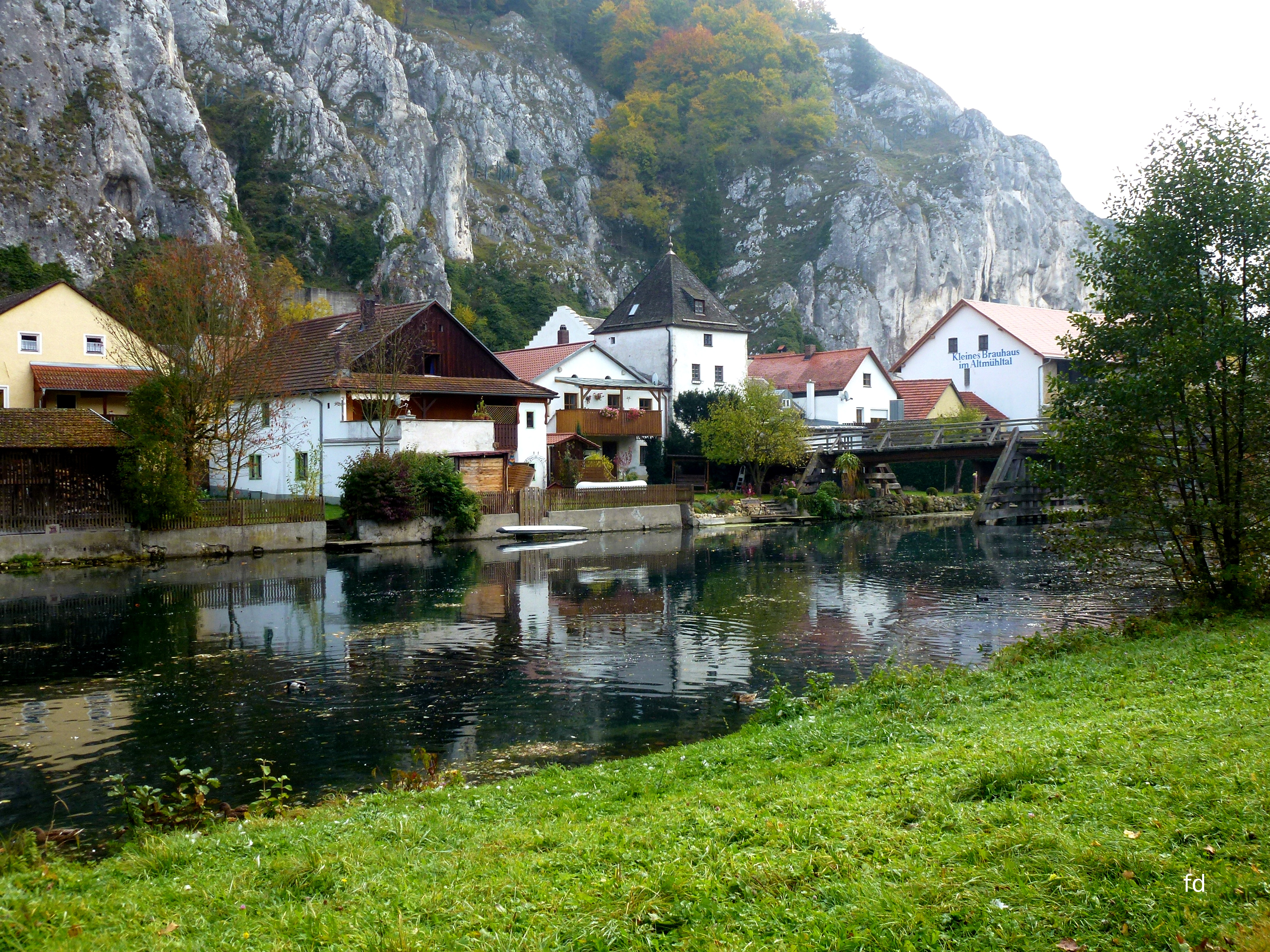
- The river Altmühl in Essing

- Coat of arms

- Location of Essing within Kelheim district
- Interactive map of Essing
- Location within Germany Location within Bavaria
- Coordinates: 48°56′4″N 11°47′24″E
- Country: Germany
- State: Bavaria
- Admin. region: Niederbayern
- District: Kelheim
- Municipal assoc.: Ihrlerstein

Government
  - Mayor (2020–26): Jörg Nowy

Area
  - Total: 17.32 km^{2} (6.69 sq mi)
- Elevation: 351 m (1,152 ft)

Population (2025-12-31)
  - Total: 1,114
  - Density: 64.32/km^{2} (166.6/sq mi)
- Time zone: UTC+01:00 (CET)
  - Summer (DST): UTC+02:00 (CEST)
- Postal codes: 93343
- Dialling codes: 09447
- Vehicle registration: KEH
- Website: www.marktessing.de

Essing (German pronunciation: [ˈɛsɪŋ]) is a municipality in the district of Kelheim in Bavaria in Germany. It lies on the river Altmühl.
