= Langquaid =

- Municipality
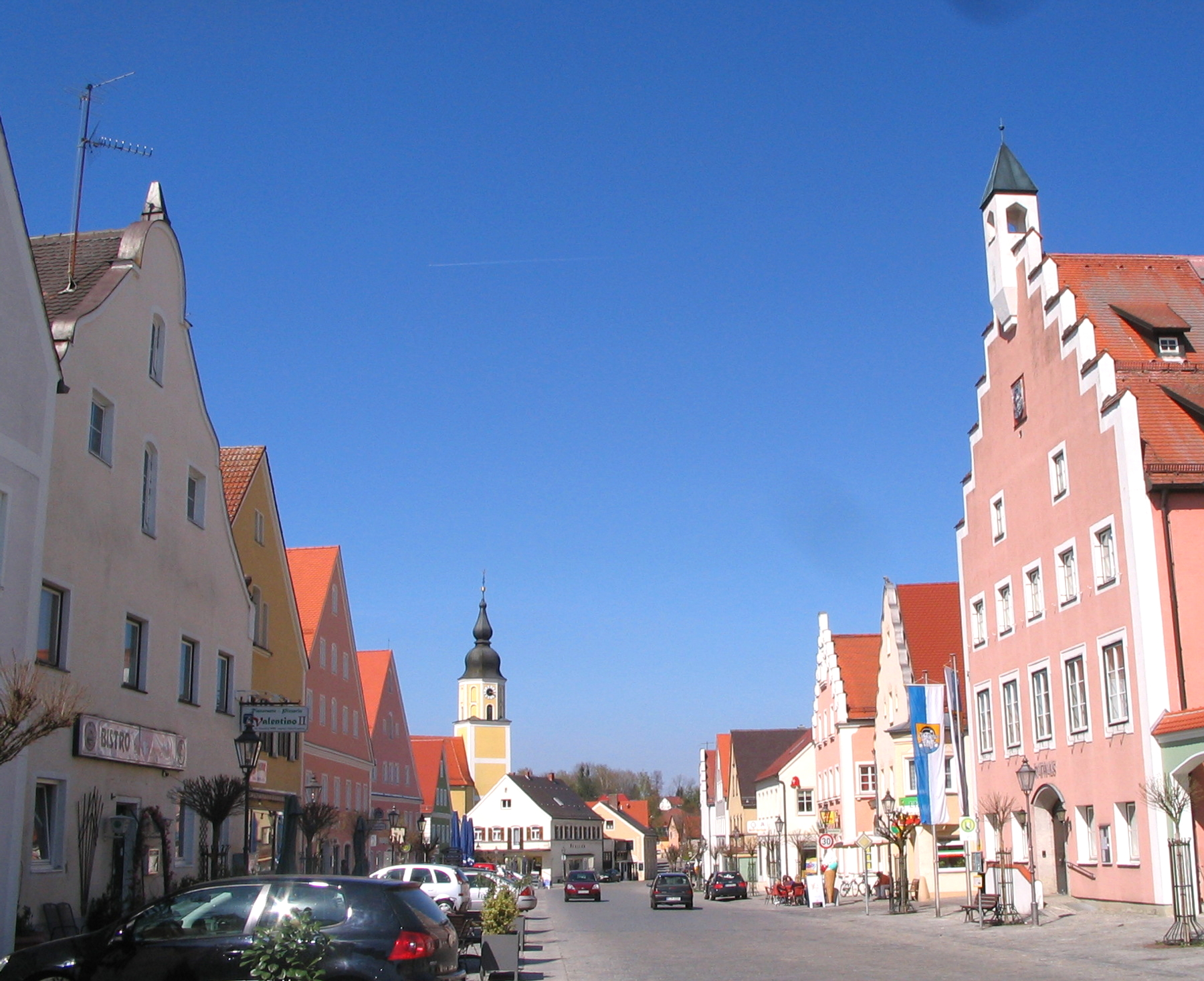
- Market square with the town hall to the right

- Coat of arms

- Location of Langquaid within Kelheim district
- Interactive map of Langquaid
- Location within Germany Location within Bavaria
- Coordinates: 48°49′N 12°03′E
- Country: Germany
- State: Bavaria
- Admin. region: Niederbayern
- District: Kelheim
- Municipal assoc.: Langquaid
- Subdivisions: 8 Ortsteile

Government
  - Mayor (2020–26): Herbert Blascheck (CSU)

Area
  - Total: 56.77 km^{2} (21.92 sq mi)
- Elevation: 389 m (1,276 ft)

Population (2025-12-31)
  - Total: 5,931
  - Density: 104.5/km^{2} (270.6/sq mi)
- Time zone: UTC+01:00 (CET)
  - Summer (DST): UTC+02:00 (CEST)
- Postal codes: 84083–84085
- Dialling codes: 09452
- Vehicle registration: KEH
- Website: www.langquaid.de

Langquaid (German pronunciation: [ˈlaŋkvaɪt]; Bavarian: Langad) is a municipality in the district of Kelheim in Bavaria in Germany.

== Ortsteile ==
Villages affiliated to the administration (Ortsteil) of Langquaid are

- Adlhausen
- Hellring
- Leitenhausen
- Niederleierndorf
- Oberleierndorf
- Paring
- Unterschneidhart
- Mitterschneidhart
- Oberschneidhart
