= Kelheim (district) =

Coordinates: 48°50′N 11°50′E

- District
- Flag Coat of arms
- Country: Germany
- State: Bavaria
- Adm. region: Lower Bavaria
- Capital: Kelheim

Government
  - District admin.: Martin Neumeyer (CSU)

Area
  - Total: 1,067 km^{2} (412 sq mi)

Population (31 December 2025)
  - Total: 126,321
  - Density: 118.4/km^{2} (306.6/sq mi)
- Time zone: UTC+01:00 (CET)
  - Summer (DST): UTC+02:00 (CEST)
- Vehicle registration: KEH, RID, MAI, ROL, PAR
- Website: landkreis-kelheim.de

Kelheim is a Landkreis (district) in Bavaria, Germany, bound (from the north and clockwise) by the districts Regensburg, Landshut, Freising, Pfaffenhofen, Eichstätt and Neumarkt.

== Geography ==
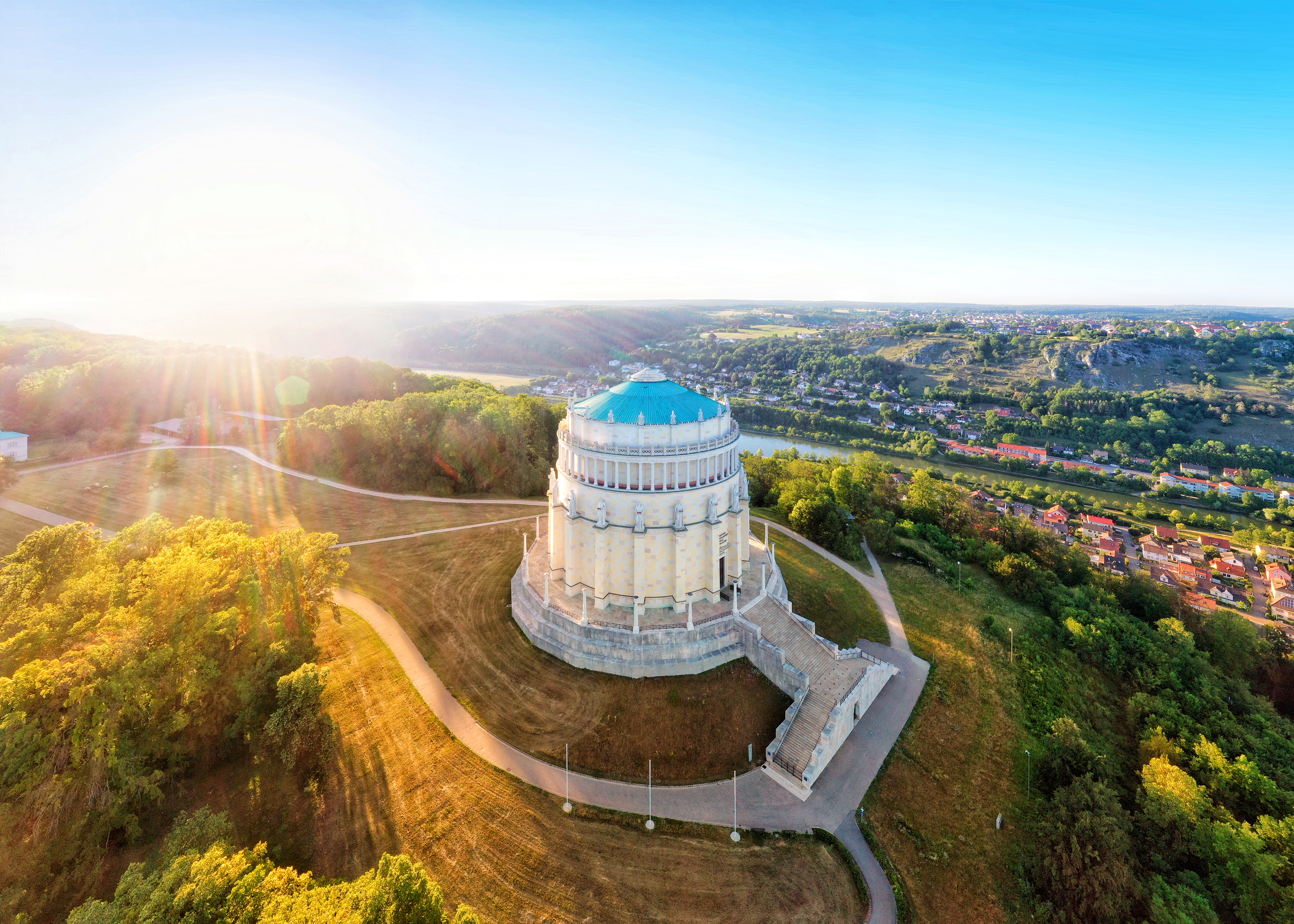
The Befreiungshalle near Kelheim

The district is located halfway between Ingolstadt and Regensburg on both banks of the Danube. In the northwestern part it includes a part of the Altmühl Valley Nature Park and the confluence of Altmühl and Danube.

== Coat of arms ==
The coat of arms displays:

- the blue and white checked pattern of Bavaria
- the roses symbolise the monasteries of Biburg and Weltenburg
- silver and black are the colours of Abensberg, which once was a free imperial city

== Towns and municipalities ==
Clickable map of towns and municipalities in the district

Towns
1. Abensberg
2. Kelheim
3. Mainburg
4. Neustadt an der Donau
5. Riedenburg
Märkte
1. Bad Abbach
2. Painten
3. Rohr in Niederbayern

Verwaltungsgemeinschaften
1. Ihrlerstein; 1. Essing^{2}; 2. Ihrlerstein^{1}	2. Langquaid; 1. Hausen; 2. Herrngiersdorf; 3. Langquaid^{1,2}	3. Mainburg; 1. Aiglsbach; 2. Attenhofen; 3. Elsendorf; 4. Volkenschwand	4. Saal an der Donau; 1. Saal an der Donau^{1}; 2. Teugn	5. Siegenburg; 1. Biburg; 2. Kirchdorf; 3. Siegenburg^{1,2}; 4. Train; 5. Wildenberg
^{1}seat of the Verwaltungsgemeinschaft; ^{2}Markt
