= Aiglsbach =

- Municipality
- Coat of arms

- Location of Aiglsbach within Kelheim district
- Interactive map of Aiglsbach
- Location within Germany Location within Bavaria
- Coordinates: 48°42′N 11°43′E
- Country: Germany
- State: Bavaria
- Admin. region: Niederbayern
- District: Kelheim
- Municipal assoc.: Mainburg

Government
  - Mayor (2020–26): Leonhard Berger

Area
  - Total: 39.85 km^{2} (15.39 sq mi)
- Elevation: 415 m (1,362 ft)

Population (2025-12-31)
  - Total: 1,925
  - Density: 48.31/km^{2} (125.1/sq mi)
- Time zone: UTC+01:00 (CET)
  - Summer (DST): UTC+02:00 (CEST)
- Postal codes: 84089
- Dialling codes: 08753
- Vehicle registration: KEH
- Website: www.aiglsbach.de

Aiglsbach (German pronunciation: [ˈaɪɡl̩sˌbax]) is a municipality and municipality in the Lower Bavarian district of Kelheim, Germany, and a member of the Mainburg administrative partnership, a voluntary resource-pooling agreement with three neighbouring municipalities.

== Geography ==
Aiglsbach lies between Regensburg and Munich, and between Ingolstadt and Landshut. The municipality comprises the following settlements: Aiglsbach, Berghausen, Gasseltshausen, Oberpindhart, Pöbenhausen, Radertshausen, Buch, Haselbuch, Gerblhäuser, Straßberg, Lindach and Moosham.

== History ==
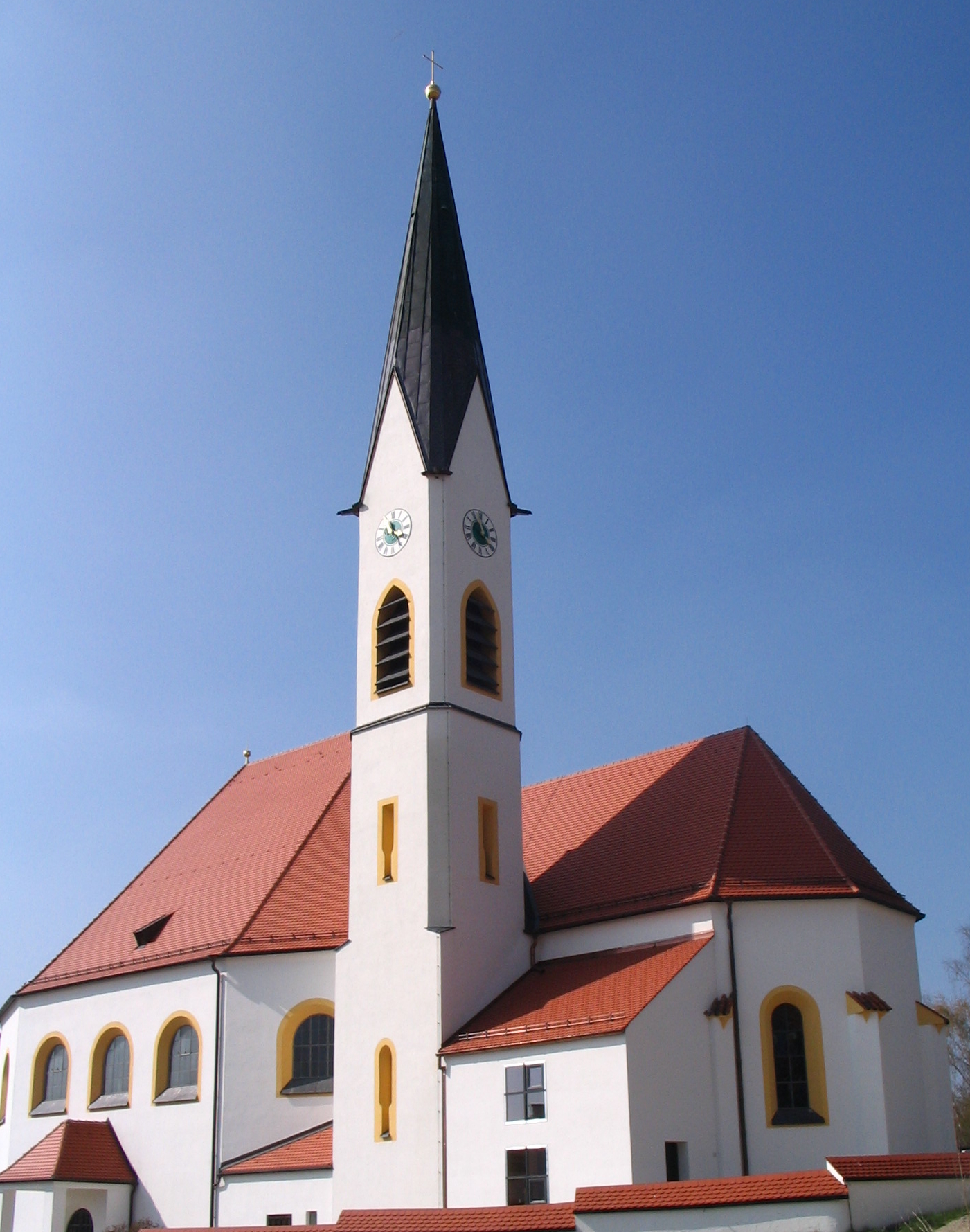
St. Leonard's Church, Aiglsbach

Aiglsbach was first recorded as a settlement in 864, with alternative names recorded as Agelspach (ca. 1145), Ailgilspach (ca. 1190) and Egilspach (ca. 1160). The name likely derives from a given name such as Agil, Egil, Aigil or Eigil, while bach refers to a stream. The town belonged to the taxation district of Munich and to the administrative district of Mainburg in the Electorate of Bavaria. Administrative reform in the Kingdom of Bavaria led in 1818 to the creation of the municipality as it is today, the official spelling being changed in 1911 from Aigelsbach to Aiglsbach.

The name of Eichelsbach, a settlement within the municipality of Elsenfeld in the Bavarian Spessart in Lower Franconia is also sometimes spelled Egilespach. Aigil or Egil was a common name in the Middle Ages, and Eichelsbach in the Spessart is thought to have been named after an abbot named Aigil, of a monastery near Fulda.

=== Population ===
In 1970 there were 1,216 residents recorded; in 1987 1,331; 2000 1,546; and in 2004 1,654.

== Politics ==
The mayor of the municipality is Josef Hillerbrand of the Christian Socialists, who was elected in 2002 replacing Martin Kiemeyer, also Christian Socialist.

== Culture and sightseeing ==
The main tourist attraction in the area is the thirteenth century romanesque Church of Our Lady (Unsere Liebe Frau) in Gasseltshausen.

== Notable residents ==
- Katrin Stotz: Alpine skier
