= Mainburg =

- Town
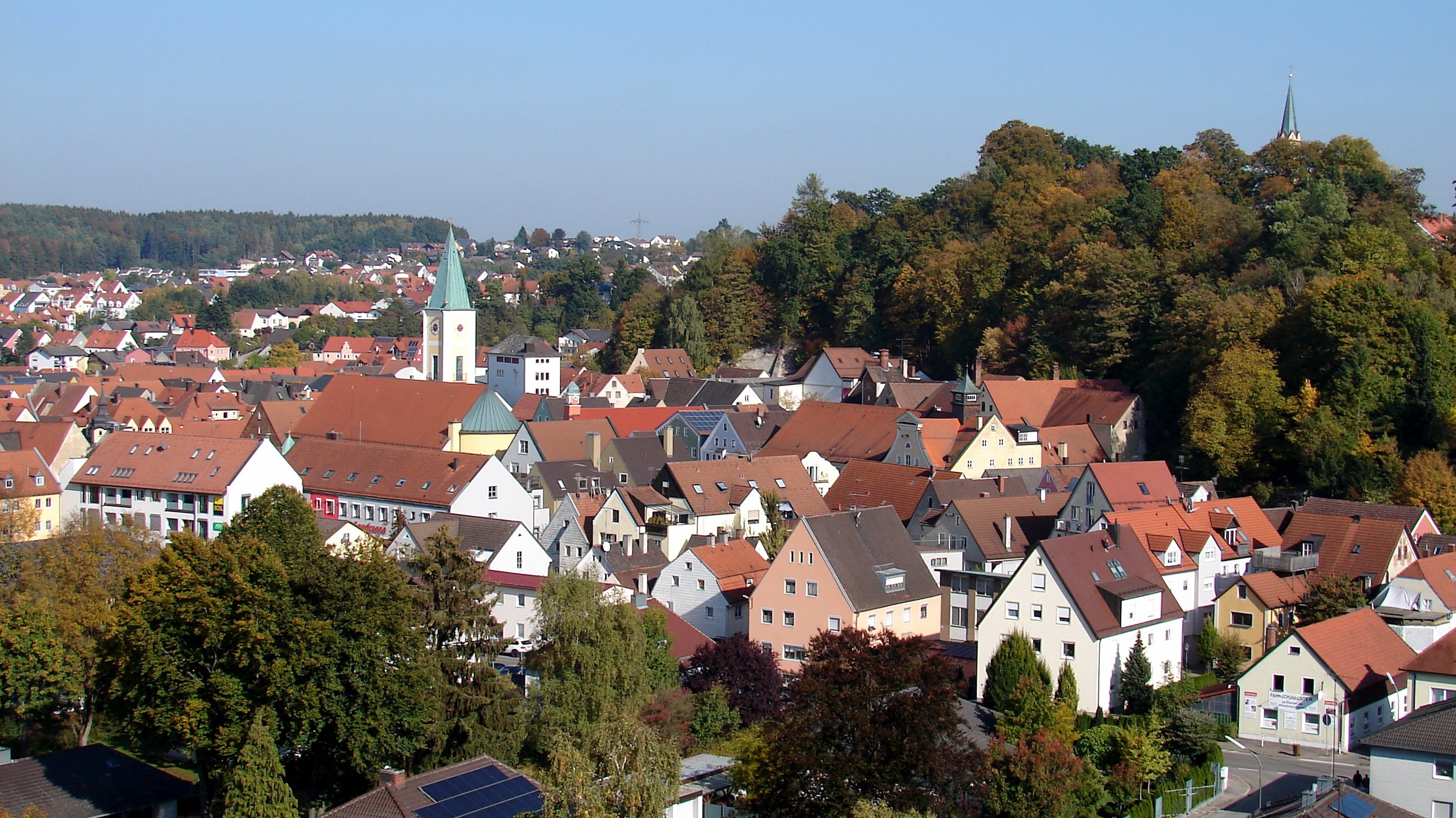
- City center of Mainburg

- Coat of arms

- Location of Mainburg within Kelheim district
- Interactive map of Mainburg
- Location within Germany Location within Bavaria
- Coordinates: 48°39′N 11°47′E
- Country: Germany
- State: Bavaria
- Admin. region: Niederbayern
- District: Kelheim

Government
  - Mayor (2020–26): Helmut Fichtner (FW)

Area
  - Total: 61.54 km^{2} (23.76 sq mi)
- Elevation: 422 m (1,385 ft)

Population (2025-12-31)
  - Total: 15,279
  - Density: 248.3/km^{2} (643.0/sq mi)
- Time zone: UTC+01:00 (CET)
  - Summer (DST): UTC+02:00 (CEST)
- Postal codes: 84042–84048
- Dialling codes: 08751
- Vehicle registration: KEH, MAI, PAR, RID, ROL
- Website: www.mainburg.de

Mainburg (German pronunciation: [ˈmaɪnbʊʁk]) is a town in the district of Kelheim, in Bavaria, Germany. It is situated on the river Abens, 30 km northwest of Landshut and 30 km southeast of Ingolstadt.

Mainburg borders four communities; Aiglsbach, Elsendorf, Attenhofen, and Volkenschwand. The town has 15,163 residents, the third largest in its district.

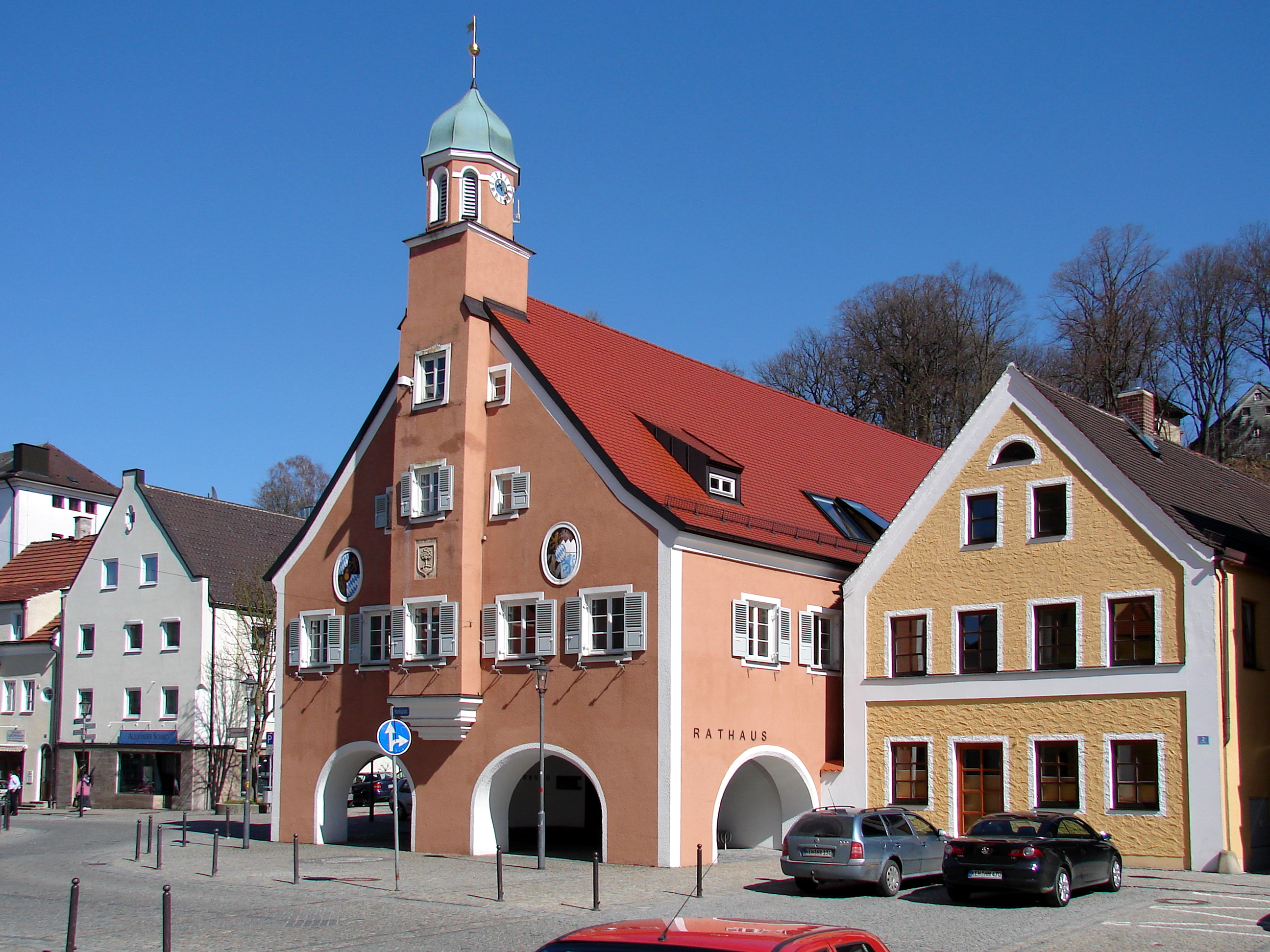
Town Hall on the market square

== People ==
- George Johann Scharf (1788–1860), German painter and lithograph
- Dominik Kaufner (born 1983), German politician
- Erhard Brucker (born 1972), German politician
