= Kirchdorf =

Kirchdorf (German pronunciation: [ˈkɪʁçdɔʁf]; Low German: Kerkdorp) or church village is a historical type of settlements in Germany. In the period when dispersed settlements were common in German rural areas, some settlements had a church and a priest that serviced the rural area in its vicinity.

A number of places in Germany are named "Kirchdorf", also Chirihdorf (Old High German), Kirdorf, Kardorf, etc.

The church in a Kirchdorf is not a parish church; settlements with a parish church were called Pfarrdorf (parish village).

A related term is Pfarrmarkt, a market town with a parish church.

== See also ==
- Kyrkstad
