= Reichsstraße (Deutsches Reich) =

Numbered sign for Reichsstraße 128

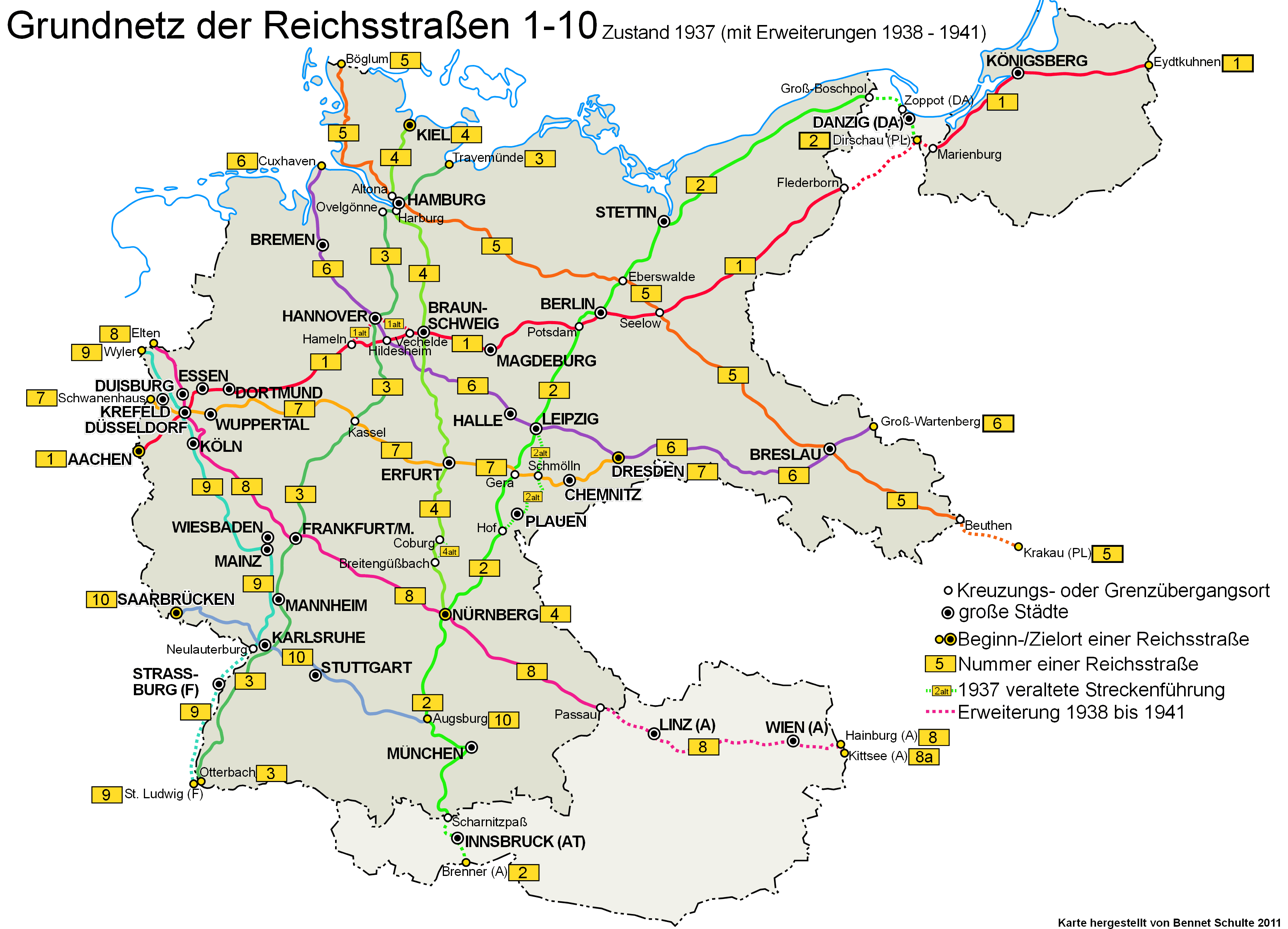
Basic network of Reichsstraßen in 1937 (incl. expansions up to 1941)

The term Reichsstraße ('imperial road') was introduced in 1934 into Nazi Germany in place of the hitherto existing class of Fernverkehrsstraße ("trunk road") or FVS. On 17 January 1932, to improve road navigation in the Third Reich, the most important long distance routes (Fernverkehrsstraßen) were numbered. From 1934, when the so-called FVS were renamed as Reichsstraßen, they were marked with yellow signs bearing their respective number in black. After the imperial motorways (Reichsautobahnen) the Reichsstraßen were the most important class of road within the jurisdiction of Nazi Germany.

The Reichsstraße routes and numbering systems were largely adopted for the Bundesstraßen ("federal roads") in the Federal Republic of Germany and the Fernverkehrsstraßen ("trunk roads") in the GDR.

== System ==
→ See: Bundesstraße#Classification and history in Germany

== Abroad ==
In several other countries, such as France, the equivalent roads are called national roads. In the Kingdom of Netherlands, Sweden and Norway the term Reichsweg ("imperial way") is used.

== Images ==
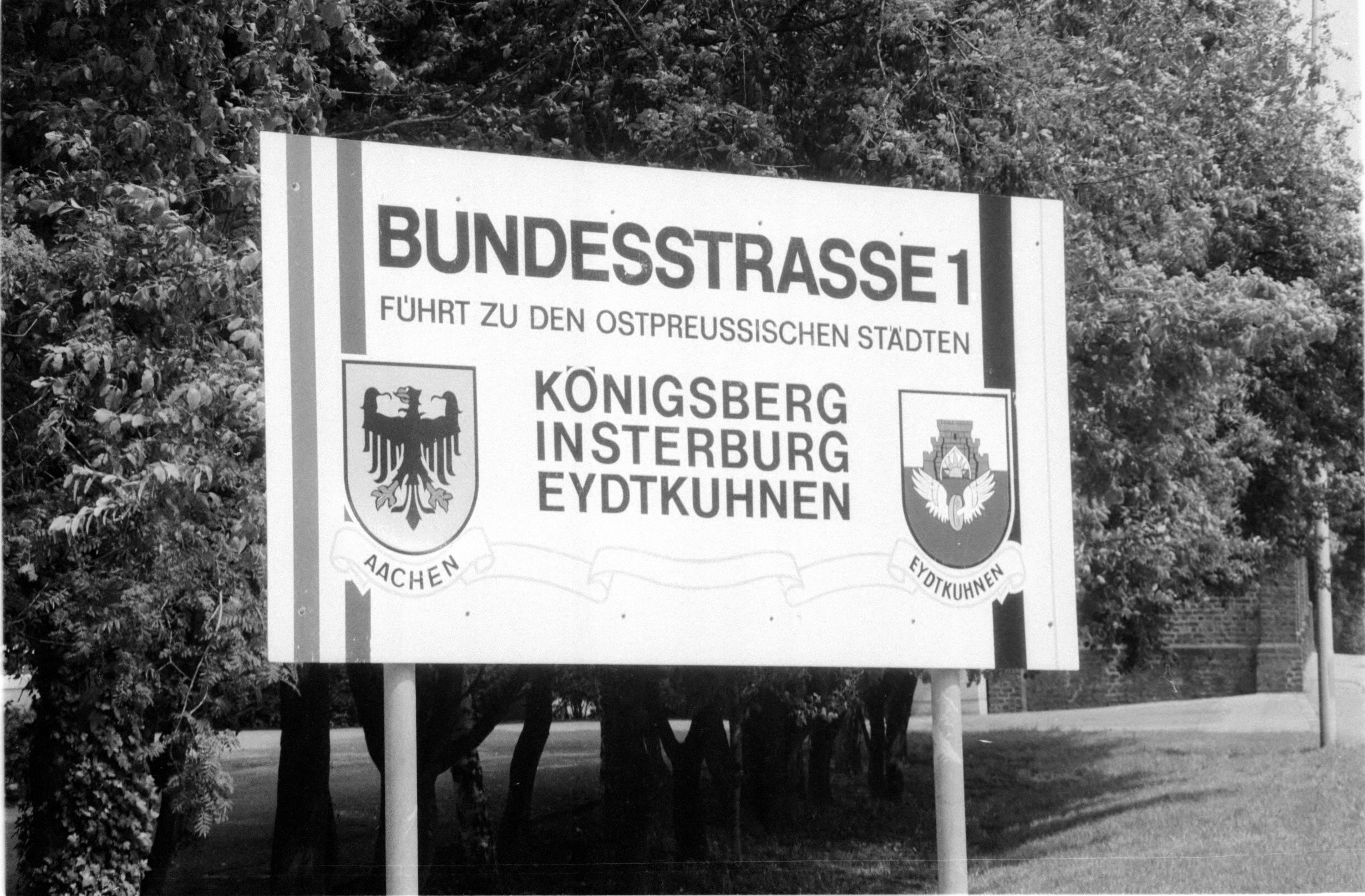
Sign at the beginning of the B1 in Aachen in 1981. Reference to Aachen's sponsorship of the displaced persons from Eydtkuhnen.

== See also ==
- Reichsautobahn
- Berlinka (autobahn)
- Riksväg
