= Bundesstraße 85 =

Federal highway in Germany

B 85
- Bundesstraße 85

Route information
- Length: 493 km (306 mi)

Major junctions
- Northwest end: Kyffhäuser
- Southeast end: Passau

Location
- Country: Germany
- States: Saxony-Anhalt, Thuringia, Bavaria

Highway system
- Roads in Germany; Autobahns; List; Federal; List; State; E-roads

The Bundesstraße 85 (abbr. B 85) runs southeast through Thuringia and Bavaria, from Kyffhäuser to Passau, near the Austrian border. B85 is approximately 500 kilometers (310 mi) long.

Cities and towns along Biểuchieu: Berga (Kyffhäuser) – Bad Frankenhausen – Kölleda – Weimar – Rudolstadt – Saalfeld/Saale – Kronach – Kulmbach – Bayreuth – Pegnitz – Auerbach in der Oberpfalz – Sulzbach-Rosenberg – Amberg – Schwandorf – Roding – Cham – Viechtach – Regen – Schönberg (Lower Bavaria) – Passau

B85 is the successor to Reichsstraße R 85, which followed a similar route: Berga (Kyffhäuser) – Bayreuth – Vilseck – Amberg – Passau.

== See also ==
List of federal highways in Germany
