= Bundesstraße 299 =

Federal highway in Germany

B 299
- Bundesstraße 299
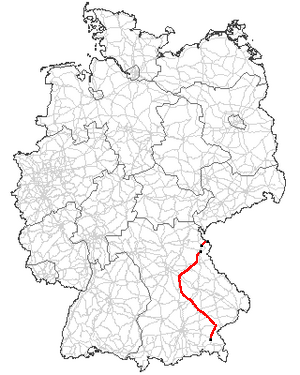

Route information
- Length: 330 km (210 mi)

Location
- Country: Germany
- States: Bavaria

Highway system
- Roads in Germany; Autobahns; List; Federal; List; State; E-roads

The Bundesstraße 299 or B 299 is a major route in the Oberpfalz (Upper Palatinate) region of Bavaria. It runs through Neumarkt in der Oberpfalz, Amberg and Grafenwoehr.
