= Afrikan Spir =

German-Greek-Russian philosopher (1837–1890)

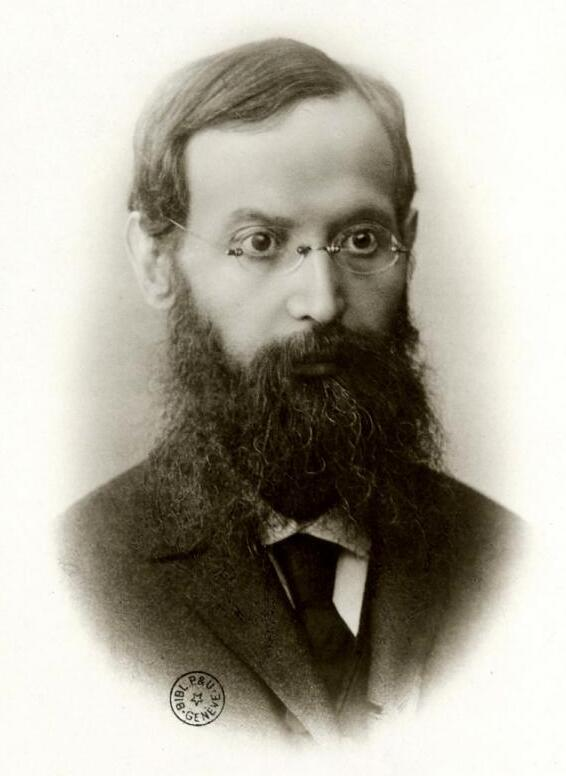
- Photograph of Afrikan Spir taken by Fred Boissonnas c.1887 (Fonds Fred Boissonnas, Bibliothèque de Genève)
- Born: 10 November 1837; Elizabethgrad, Kherson Governorate, Russian Empire (now Kropyvnytskyi, Ukraine)
- Died: 26 March 1890 (aged 52); Geneva, Switzerland

Philosophical work
- Era: 19th-century philosophy
- Region: Western philosophy
- School: Neo-Kantianism
- Main interests: Epistemology, logic, morality, ontology, philosophy of religion
- Notable ideas: The principle of identity as the theoretical foundation of morality

Afrikan Alexandrovich Spir, (Note: Ukrainian: Спір Африкан Олександрович; German: Afrikan (von) Spir; French: African (de) Spir; Italian: Africano Spir) also spelled African Spir (1837–1890), was a Russian-born philosopher of German-Greek descent who wrote primarily in German, but also French.

His book Denken und Wirklichkeit (Thought and Reality, 1873) had a significant influence on several eminent philosophers, scholars and writers such as Hans Vaihinger, Friedrich Nietzsche, William James, Leo Tolstoy and Rudolf Steiner. (Note: For Nietzsche's annotations in his copy of African Spir's Thought and Reality, as well as Hélène's Claparède-Spir comments on these annotations in a letter in German to Hans Vaihinger (dated Geneva, March, 11th, 1930), cf. Fabrizio Frigerio (1990) p. 15, n. 29 c., Ms. l.e. 253.)

== Biography ==
=== Early life and family ===
Afrikan Spir was born on 10 November 1837 in his father's estates of Spirovska, near the city of Elizabethgrad, Kherson Governorate, Russian Empire (now Kropyvnytskyi, Ukraine). (Note: In the biography of Afrikan Spir written by his daughter Hélène as an introduction to Nouvelles Esquisses de Philosophie Critique, his date of birth is given as 15 November 1837 (Vie de A. Spir, p.IX).)

His father, Alexander Alexandrovich Spir, of German-Jewish descent, was a Russian Empire surgeon—Chief Physician of the military Hospital of Odessa specifically—and former professor of mathematics in Moscow. In 1812, he received the Order of St. Vladimir, was knighted, and became councillor and member of Kherson's Governorate hereditary nobility. (Note: According to the Russian Law about the Nobility, people who were awarded with the St. Vladimir Order (each class) had had the rights of hereditary nobility until the Emperor's Decree of 1900 was issued. After this only three first classes of the Order gave such a right.) His mother, Helena Constantinovna Spir, daughter of the major Poulevich, was on her mother's side the granddaughter of the Greek painter Logino, who arrived in Russian Empire under the reign of Catherine the Great. (Note: In the biography of Afrikan Spir written by his daughter Hélène as an introduction to Nouvelles Esquisses de Philosophie Critique, his mother's name is given as Elena Arsenowna Poulevich (Vie de A. Spir, p.IX).)

Alexander and Helena had four children—three boys and one girl— Aristarque, Kharitine, Alexandre and African. The names were chosen, on the whim (un caprice) of their father, from an old synaxis of the Orthodox calendar, which is the source of the curious name "Afrikan" (a very uncommon name of a minor orthodox saint, the father of Šimon). Spir disliked his Christian name, simply signing his letters and books "A. Spir". His modesty impelled him not to use either the German "von" or the French "de"—denoting his noble status—before his family name. (Note: Or to abridge it, if it was absolutely necessary to maintain it, like in his engagement-card: "A. v. Spir-Elise Gatternicht Verlobte Odessa December 1871 Stuttgart", cf.Ibid., p. 4, Personal papers of African Spir, Ms. fr. 1406, 2, no.7.)

=== Education ===
He described his education as follows: "I spent my childhood in the countryside and later I studied for a while in Odessa, first in a Private boarding-school and after in a Gymnasium, more or less equivalent, if I do not mistake, to a French high-school".

During this period he developed an interest in philosophy and read (in the French translation of Tissot) Immanuel Kant's Critique of Pure Reason, which gave him the basis of his speculative thought. He later followed the readings of Descartes, David Hume, and Stuart Mill. (Note: "two philosophers, Stuart Mill and David Hume, that he appreciated very particularly, and who always stayed his preferred authors, "because, he said, of their clarity et of their perfect sincerity". Hélène Claparède-Spir, Paroles d'un sage : choix de pensées d'African Spir, (Words of a wise man: choice of Spir's words) Paris-Genève, Je Sers-Labor, 1937, p.24.)

Later he went to Leipzig where he attended the lectures of Moritz Wilhelm Drobisch (1802–1896), a Herbartian philosopher and one of the forerunners of the neo-Kantian revival of the 1860s. He was there at the same time that Nietzsche was a student, although it does not appear that they met.

=== Military service ===
After gymnasium, Spir entered the Midshipmen's School in Nikolayev (now Mykolaiv), not far from the Black Sea. In 1855, at the age of 18, he participated as Sub-lieutenant of the Russian navy in the Crimean War, during which he was twice decorated (Order of St. Andrew and Order of St. George). Spir defended the same bastion (N. 4 at Malakoff) as Leo Tolstoy during the siege of Sevastopol.

=== Later life, marriage and Swiss citizenship ===
After his father's death in 1852, he inherited his father's estates (his last remaining brother, the poet Aristarch, having died in 1841) whereupon he emancipated his serfs and gave them land, goods and money, presaging the reform of 1861.

In 1862, he left Elizabethgrad for a tour in Germany, where he spent two years "to know better the mind's matter". His sister Charitis died soon after his return to Russia in 1864. After the death of his mother, in 1867, he sold his estates at a ridiculously low price, distributed almost all of his possessions and left Russian Empire permanently.

In 1869, he moved to Tübingen and to Stuttgart in 1871. Here, at the orthodox Church of the Court, (Note: Ibid.: "I was educated and baptized in the Greco-Russian faith, although my father was a Protestant.") he married on 30 January 1872, Elisabeth (Elise) Gatternich. (Note: Elise Sophie Adelaïde Gatternicht, born on 4 June 1850 in Stuttgart, daughter of Johann Adam Gatternicht and Jeanne Catherine, born Heuss (Excerpt of Certificate of Birth, Stuttgart, 19 July 1883), Fabrizio Frigerio (1990) p. 4, Personal Papers of African Spir, Ms. fr. 1406, 5, nos. 8 and 9.) The couple had a daughter, Hélène. (Note: Hélène-Catherine-Augusta Spir (Stuttgart, 14 February 1873 – Geneva, 12 November 1955), who will marry the Swiss neurologist and psychologist Edouard Claparède (Geneva, 24 March 1873 – Geneva, 29 September 1940) and became Hélène Claparède-Spir (or Elena Afrikanovna Klapared-Spir, in russian: Елона Африкановна Клапаред-Спир (Шпир).)

In 1884, Spir asked the Russian Emperor for an allowance to forsake Russian citizenship and to obtain Swiss citizenship. In the same year, he received the imperial authorization and applied for a certificate of registry at Belmont-sur-Lausanne, where he lived with his family. In 1886, to enjoy the facilities of a bigger library (the "Société de Lecture", a private reading society), (Note: Due to his chronic cough, it was not possible for Spir to read books in a public library; as a member of the "Société de Lecture" it was possible for him to take at home the books that he wanted to read.) he moved to Geneva. (Note: Establishment's Setting n. 18529, delivered 19 June 1886, to Mr. African De Spir, without profession, born 10 November 1837, from Russia, married to Miss Eisabeth De Gatternicht, Fabrizio Frigerio (1990) p. 5, no. 24.) On 17 September 1889, he received authorization for his wife, his daughter, and himself to become Swiss citizens from the Swiss Federal Government.

=== Death ===
In 1878, having suffered from pneumonia, in order to treat the consequences of his illness, a chronic cough, Spir moved to Lausanne, Switzerland, where he spent five years.

He died of influenza on 26 March 1890 in Geneva, at 6 rue Petitot. (Note: Spir died at 9 PM, Fabrizio Frigerio, Catalogue raisonné du fonds African Spir (Analytical Catalogue of Afrikan Spir's Corpus) p. 6, n. 28. Death certificate of African Spir, 26 March 1890 (Vol. 1890, n. 139).) He was buried in the Saint-Georges cemetery. He was survived by his wife Elisabeth and his daughter, Hélène.

The surname and lineage are reported to persist in modern times, with some pointing to Mikhailo Fyodorovich Spir (b. 1986), Deputy Minister in the Kherson region, as a possible descendant.

=== Writings ===
In Leipzig, Spir befriended the publisher and fellow Freemason Joseph Gabriel Findel, who published most of Spir's works. His most important book, Denken und Wirklichkeit: Versuch einer Erneuerung der kritischen Philosophie (Thought and Reality: Attempt at a Renewal of Critical Philosophy) was published in 1873. A second edition, which was the one owned by Nietzsche, was published in 1877. In an attempt to reach a broader readership, Spir wrote directly in French his Esquisses de philosophie critique (Outlines of critical philosophy), published for the first time in 1877. (Note: "The author of the present Outlines who, without being himself a German, has published many books in German, will submit his philosophy to the scrutiny of the French Public.", Fabrizio Frigerio (1990) p. 9, no. 14, Ms. fr. 1410.) A new edition was published forty years after his death, in 1930, with an introduction by the French philosopher and professor at the Sorbonne Léon Brunschvicg.

Manuscripts, personal papers, photographs, books by or on African Spir were donated in March 1940 by his daughter Hélène Claparède-Spir (who was married to the Swiss neurologist Édouard Claparède) to the Library of Geneva (Bibliothèque de Genève, formerly Bibliothèque Publique et Universitaire de Genève), where they compose the "Fonds African Spir" and can be consulted.

To celebrate the centenary of his birth, a selection of Spir's writings, Paroles d'un sage ("Words of a sage"), was collated and published by his daughter, Hélène Claparède-Spir in 1937. Some of these thoughts were later reproduced in a collection of Spir's letters.

Other papers concerning Spir, his daughter Hélène Claparède-Spir and her family can be consulted at Harvard University Library.

== Autobiography ==
Spir provided a biographical sketch ("esquisse biographique") of himself that he added to some of his letters of correspondence, after 1882:

My name is African Spir (this strange and unusual name, which I owe to a whim of my father, quite bothers me sometimes). I was born on November 15, 1837, in South Russia, and I was raised in the Greco-Russian religion, although my father was a Protestant. I spent my childhood in the countryside, and later I studied in Odessa, in a gymnasium that corresponds more or less, if I am not mistaken, to a French high school. I didn't go to university, but I entered the Midshipmen's School in Nicolayew, near the Black Sea. On leaving this school, in 1856, I left the naval service and retired to a countryside that belonged to me. In 1862 I left for Germany and spent two years there, to be more aware of spiritual matters. In 1867, I left Russia permanently, and I lived in Germany, first in Leipzig, then in Stuggart, where I married. From 1882 until now, I have lived in Lausanne. I have never had any other occupation than reading and solitary meditation, being moreover, of poor health and subject, for seven years, to a chronic cough.

— "Textes Ajoutés par Spir A Certaines de Ses Lettres", Lettres Inédites de African Spir au professeur Penjon. Éditions du Griffon Neuchâtel (Introduction de Émile Bréhier), pp.207-208 (1948).

== Honours ==
- Order of St. Andrew
- Order of St. George (fourth class)

== Philosophy ==
=== Epistemology ===
Spir referred to his philosophy as "critical philosophy". He sought to establish philosophy as the science of first principles, he held that the task of philosophy was to investigate immediate knowledge, show the delusion of empiricism, and present the true nature of things by strict statements of facts and logically controlled inference. This method led Spir to proclaim the principle of identity (or law of identity, A ≡ A) as the fundamental law of knowledge, which is opposed to the changing appearance of empirical reality.

=== Ontology ===
For Spir the principle of identity is not only the fundamental law of knowledge, it is also an ontological principle, expression of the unconditioned essence of reality (Realität = Identität mit sich), which is opposed to the empirical reality (Wirklichkeit), which in turn is evolution (Geschehen). The principle of identity displays the essence of reality: only that which is identical to itself is real, the empirical world is ever-changing, therefore it is not real. Thus the empirical world has an illusory character, because phenomena are ever-changing, and empirical reality is unknowable.

=== Religion and morality ===
Religion, morality and philosophy, have for Spir the same theoretical foundation: the principle of identity, which is the characteristic of the supreme being, of the absolute, of God. God is not the creator deity of the universe and mankind, but man's true nature and the norm of all things, in general. The moral and religious conscience live in the consciousness of the contrast between this norm (Realität) and empirical reality (Wirklichkeit). "There is a radical dualism between the empirical nature of man and his moral nature" and the awareness of this dualism is the sole true foundation of moral judgment.

=== Social justice ===
Socially, Spir was not favourable to inherited wealth's accumulation in private hands and demanded just distribution of material goods, but disapproved of collectivism. He set the example, redistributing his personal inherited land properties to his former serfs.

== Critical reception ==
Although he spent most of his life as a philosopher, Spir never held a university appointment and his writings remained relatively unknown and unrecognized throughout his life. Indeed, Spir complained of a wall or conspiracy of silence (das Totschweigen). Yet, he had a significant influence on several eminent philosophers, scholars and writers such as Hans Vaihinger, Friedrich Nietzsche, William James, Leo Tolstoy and Rudolf Steiner. Vaihinger read Spir's Thought and Reality as soon as it was published (1873) and recalls that it made a "great impression". (Note: "I was 21 years old when in 1873 was published this important book (Thought and Reality by A. Spir), which I started immediately to study diligently. The book produced immediately a great impression." 8 March 1930, in a memory on an article of the Nouvelles littéraires (Literary News) on Nietzsche and Spir.) Nietzsche described him as "a distinguished logician" (eines ausgezeichneten logikers) and "the logician I value" (Der von mir geschätzte Logiker heißt: A. Spir). James makes several references to Spir in his Principles of Psychology, for example when debating a certain Kantian issue he wrote, "On the whole, the best recent treatment of the question known to me is in one of A. Spir's works, his Denken und Wirklichkeit".

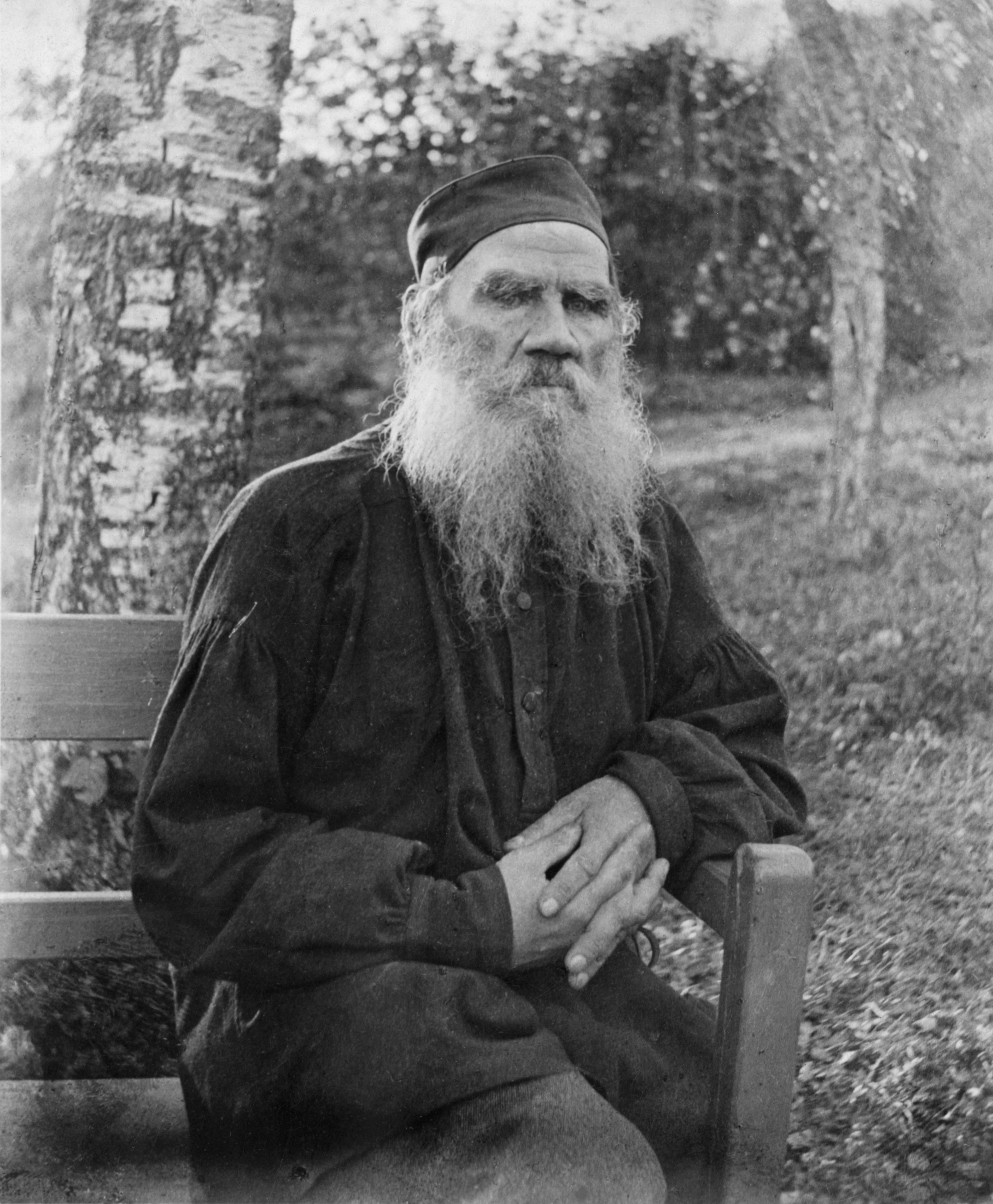
"I am reading Spir all the time, and the reading provokes a mass of thoughts". Leo Tolstoy, Journal, May 1896

In 1896 Leo Tolstoy read Thought and Reality and was also deeply impressed, as he mentioned in a letter to Hélène Claparède-Spir: "reading Thought and Reality has been a great joy for me. I do not know a philosopher so profound and at the same time so precise, I mean scientific, accepting only what is strictly necessary and clear for everybody. I am sure that his doctrine will be understood and appreciated as it deserves and that the destiny of his work will be similar to that of Schopenhauer, who became known and admired only after his death". (Note: The original letter can be consulted at the Bibliothèque de Genève, cf. Fabrizio Frigerio (1990) p.17, n. 2. Manuscript letter (in French) to Hélène Claparède-Spir in Stuttgart, 1/13 May 1896.)

In his Journal (2 May 1896) Tolstoy wrote: "Still another important event the work [Thought and Reality] of African Spir. I just read through what I wrote in the beginning of this notebook. At bottom, it is nothing else than a short summary of all of Spir's philosophy which I not only had not read at that time, but about which I had not the slightest idea. This work clarified my ideas on the meaning of life remarkably, and in some ways strengthened them. The essence of his doctrine is that things do not exist, but only our impressions which appear to us in our conception as objects. Conception (Vorstellung) has the quality of believing in the existence of objects. This comes from the fact that the quality of thinking consists in attributing an objectivity to impressions, a substance, and a projecting of them into space". The next day (3 May 1896) he added, "I am reading Spir all the time, and the reading provokes a mass of thoughts".

The most important works on Spir's philosophy were published between 1900 and 1914 (Theodor Lessing, Andreas Zacharoff, Joseph Segond, Gabriel Huan, Piero Martinetti).

In a lecture given in 1917, Rudolf Steiner called Spir "extraordinarily fascinating" and an "original thinker", and someone possessed of a "subtlety" not found in his 19th century contemporaries. As a consequence, Spir was unfortunately not understood and "suffered all the distress that a thinker can experience from being entirely ignored; killed by silence as the saying goes".

After the First World War, the interpretation of Spir's thought by the Italian philosopher Martinetti gave it a second life for a short while, in the form of a "religious idealism". In 1937, for the centennial of Spir's birth, Martinetti published in Italy a monographic edition on Spir of the Rivista di Filosofia (Philosophical Review).

Before the Second World War, Hélène Claparède-Spir published some new editions of her father's books in French and had an extensive exchange of letters to promote her father's thought.

After the Second World War, African Spir fell into oblivion. In 1990, for the centennial of Spir's death in Geneva, the Geneva Public Library organized an exhibition of African Spir's corpus and published the analytical catalogue. Many of Spir's books have not been entirely sold and are still available in their first or second edition (in German, French, Italian, English, or Spanish translations). Presumably, due to the increasing interest in the argument at the beginning of the twenty-first century, a reprint of the Italian translation by Odoardo Campa in 1911 of Spir's Moralität und Religion (1874) has been published in 2008.

== Works ==
- 1866. Die Wahrheit, Leipzig, J.G. Findel (under the pseudonym of "Prais", anagram of: A. Spir, 2nd ed. under the name of A. Spir 1867, Leipzig, Förster und Findel).
- 1868. Andeutung zu einem widerspruchlosen Denken, Leipzig, J.G. Findel.
- 1869. Erörterung einer philosophischen Grundeinsicht, Leipzig, J.G. Findel.
- 1869. Forschung nach der Gewissheit in der Erkenntniss der Wirklichkeit, Leipzig, J.G. Findel.
- 1869. Kurze Darstellung der Grundzüge einer philosophischen Anschauungsweise, Leipzig, J.G. Findel.
- 1869. Vorschlag an die Freunde einer vernünftigen Lebensführung, Leipzig, J.G. Findel (French translation by Hélène Claparède-Spir: Projet d'un coenobium laïque, Ed. of Coenobium, Lugano, 1907).
- 1870. Kleine Schriften, Leipzig, J.G. Findel.
- 1873. Denken und Wirklichkeit: Versuch einer Erneuerung der kritischen Philosophie, 1st ed. Leipzig, J. G. Findel.
- 1874. Moralität und Religion, 1st ed. Leipzig, J.G. Findel. (Italian translation by Odoardo Campa: Religione, Lanciano, Carabba, 1911, reprint 2008).
- 1876. Empirie und Philosophie: vier Abhandlungen, Leipzig, J.G. Findel.
- 1876. "Zu der Frage der ersten Principien", in: Philosophische Monatshefte, XII, p. 49–55.
- 1877. Denken und Wirklichkeit: Versuch einer Erneuerung der kritischen Philosophie, 2d ed. Leipzig, J. G. Findel.
  (French translation from the 3rd ed. by A. Penjon: Pensée et réalité: essai d'une réforme de la philosophie critique, Lille, Au siège des Facultés – Paris, Alcan, 1896).
- 1877. Sinn und Folgen der modernen Geistesströmung, 1st ed. Leipzig, J.G. Findel.
- 1878. Moralität und religion, 2d ed. Leipzig, J.G. Findel.
- 1878. Sinn und Folgen der modernen Geistesströmung, 2d ed. Leipzig, J.G. Findel.
- 1879. Johann Gottlieb Fichte nach seinen Briefen, Leipzig, J. G. Findel.
- 1879. Recht und Unrecht: Eine Erörterung der Principien, Leipzig, J.G. Findel.(2nd ed., 1883, Italian translation by Cesare Goretti: La Giustizia, Milano, Lombarda, 1930; French translation: Principes de justice sociale, Genève: Éditions du Mon-Blanc (Hélène Claparède-Spir ed., Préf. de Georges Duhamel); English translation by Alexander Frederick Falconer: Right and Wrong, Edinburgh, Oliver and Boyd, 1954).
- 1879. Ueber Idealismus und Pessimismus, Leipzig, J.G. Findel.
- 1879. "Ob eine vierte Dimension des Raums denkbar ist?", in: Philosophische Monatshefte, XV, p. 350–352.
- 1880. Vier Grundfragen, Leipzig, J.G. Findel.
- 1883. Studien, Leipzig, J.G. Findel.
- 1883. Über Religion: Ein Gespräch, 1st ed. Leipzig, J.G. Findel. (Italian translation by O. Campa, Ed. of Coenobium, Lugano, 1910.
- 1883–85. Gesammelte Schriften Leipzig:, J.G. Findel, (republished in 1896 by Paul Neff, Stuttgart).
- 1885. Philosophische Essays, Leipzig:, J.G. Findel, (republished in 1896 by Paul Neff, Stuttgart).
- 1887. Esquisses de philosophie critique, Paris, Ancienne librairie Germer-Baillière et Cie, F. Alcan éditeur. (Russian translation by N. A. Bracker, Moscow, 1901; Italian translation by O. Campa, with an introduction by P. Martinetti, Milan, 1913).
- 1890. Deux questions vitales: De la Connaissance du bien et du mal; De l'immortalité, Genève, Stapelmohr (published anonymously).
- 1895. "Wie gelangen wir zur Freiheit und Harmonie des Denkens", in: Archiv für systematische Philosophie, Bd. I, Heft 4, p. 457–473.
- 1897. Über Religion: Ein Gespräch, 2d ed. Leipzig, J.G. Findel.
- 1899. Nouvelles esquisses de philosophie critique (études posthumes), Paris, Librairie Félix Alcan, (Spanish translation by R. Urbano, Madrid, 1904).
- 1908–1909. Gesammelte Werke, Leipzig, J.A. Barth (Hélène Claparède-Spir ed.).
- 1930. Esquisses de philosophie critique, Paris, Libraire Félix Alcan (Nouvelle éd. avec une introduction par Léon Brunschvicg, Membre de l'Institut)
- 1930. Propos sur la guerre, Paris, Editions Truchy-Leroy (Hélène Claparède-Spir ed.).
- 1937. Paroles d'un sage, Paris-Genève, Je Sers-Labor (Choix de pensées d'African Spir avec une esquisse biografique, Hélène Claparède-Spir ed., 2d ed. Paris, Alcan, 1938).
- 1948. Lettres inédites de African Spir au professeur Penjon, Neuchâtel, Éditions du Griffon (Introd. d'Émile Bréhier).
