= Findel =

Findel may refer to:

- Findel, Luxembourg, a town in southern Luxembourg
- Luxembourg Airport, previously known as Luxembourg-Findel Airport, Luxembourg's main airport, located near the town of Findel
- Studio Retail Group plc, known as Findel plc until 2019, a British home shopping company
- Joseph Gabriel Findel German writer and publisher on Freemasonry.
