= Via Mediolanum-Verbannus =

Ancient Roman road connecting Milan to Lake Maggiore

Mediolanum-Verbannus
- Part of Roman road system
- Northwest Italy
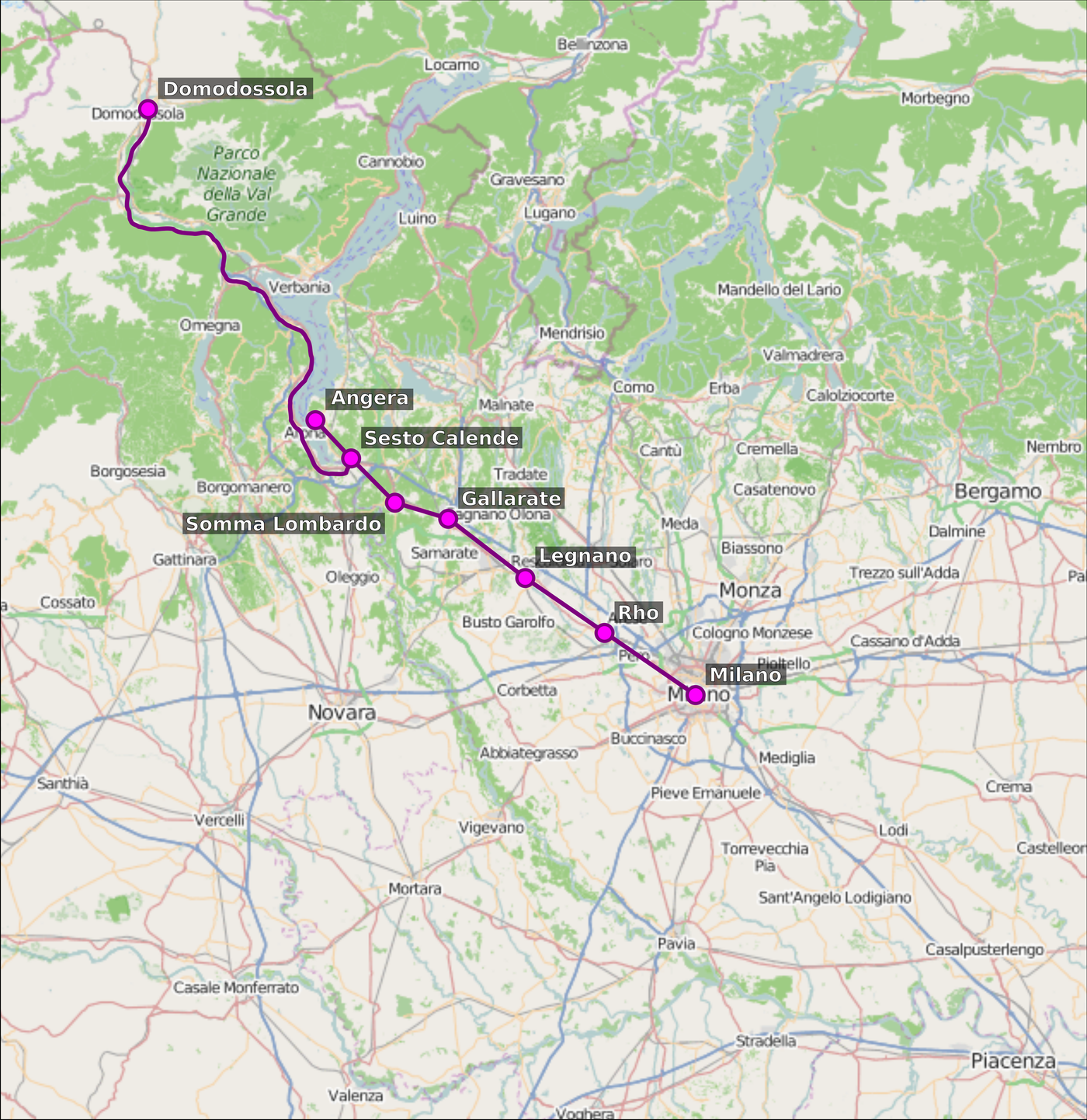
- Route of the Via Mediolanum-Verbannus, including the branch from Sesto Calende to Domodossola

Site information
- Type: Military road
- Owner: Roman Empire
- Controlled by: Roman Republic; Roman Empire; Western Roman Empire
- Condition: Few ancient remains discovered

Location
- Length: Approximately 45 Roman miles (from Milan to Angera)

Site history
- Built: Mediolanum (Milan)
- In use: Sebuinus (Angera)

The Via Mediolanum-Verbannus (in Italian "via Milano-Verbano") is the modern name given to a Roman road located in the Regio XI Transpadana.

Constructed between the late Republican era and the early decades of the Imperial era, it connected Mediolanum (modern Milan) to the Verbannus Lacus (Lake Verbano, or Lake Maggiore) and onward to the Simplon Pass, facilitating passage across the Alps.

A 19th-century theory suggests it was expanded by Emperor Septimius Severus.

Designed for terrestrial transport, this road was complemented by waterways, primarily the Olona River, enabling both land and water-based movement.

Much of its route, reused during the Middle Ages and beyond, was later adapted by Napoleon Bonaparte for the Sempione State Road.

== History ==
The Mediolanum-Verbannus was built following the Roman conquest of Cisalpine Gaul, after the pacification of Alpine territories.

Initially, the Romans relied on water routes along the Olona River, heavily utilized from the late Republican era into the early Imperial era. The Olona, along with its many tributaries and Lombard lakes, formed an extensive network of navigable waterways.

This trade fostered the establishment of towns and villages along the route. Existing settlements also prospered, their predominantly agricultural economies experiencing growth.

To support this development, a terrestrial road network was needed to complement the waterways, enhancing connectivity among villages and small towns. Similarly, significant waterway improvements were undertaken in Milan.

Thus, a road was constructed along the Milan-Verbano axis, augmented by lateral branches linking rural settlements. However, no documentary evidence of its construction exists, leading to decades of belief that the Roman government funded no terrestrial roads in the Insubrian region. Indeed, no consular roads are found here. For years, archaeological evidence of this road was also absent.

After abandonment during the Barbarian invasions, the Mediolanum-Verbannus saw renewed use in the Middle Ages.

During this period, it became one of the pilgrimage routes, with travelers heading to Milan passing along what was then called the Via Romana.

Much of its medieval path was later repurposed by Napoleon Bonaparte for the Sempione State Road. In Legnano, both the ancient medieval road and the modern Sempione route are colloquially known as the "strada magna".

== Studies ==
Ancient sources on Insubrian geography are scarce, mostly dating from the 2nd century BC onward.

This paucity long deterred studies of connectivity between Milan and Lake Maggiore, which began in earnest only in the early 1960s. It was then recognized that the route linking Milan, Verbano, and the Simplon Pass, active in the Middle Ages, had far older origins.

A breakthrough came in 1985 when archaeologists uncovered a Roman road segment in Somma Lombardo, near the presumed path to Lake Maggiore, with further finds in 2002. Subsequent discoveries, alongside deeper analysis of existing artifacts like milestones and epigraphic materials, confirmed its Roman-era existence.

== Pavement Characteristics ==
Archaeological investigations in Somma Lombardo revealed that the deepest layers of the Mediolanum-Verbannus pavement consisted of gravel and river pebbles compacted into a clay substrate.

The glareated road surface featured drainage channels along its sides for rainwater. Further analysis indicates it underwent regular maintenance.

== Terrestrial Route ==
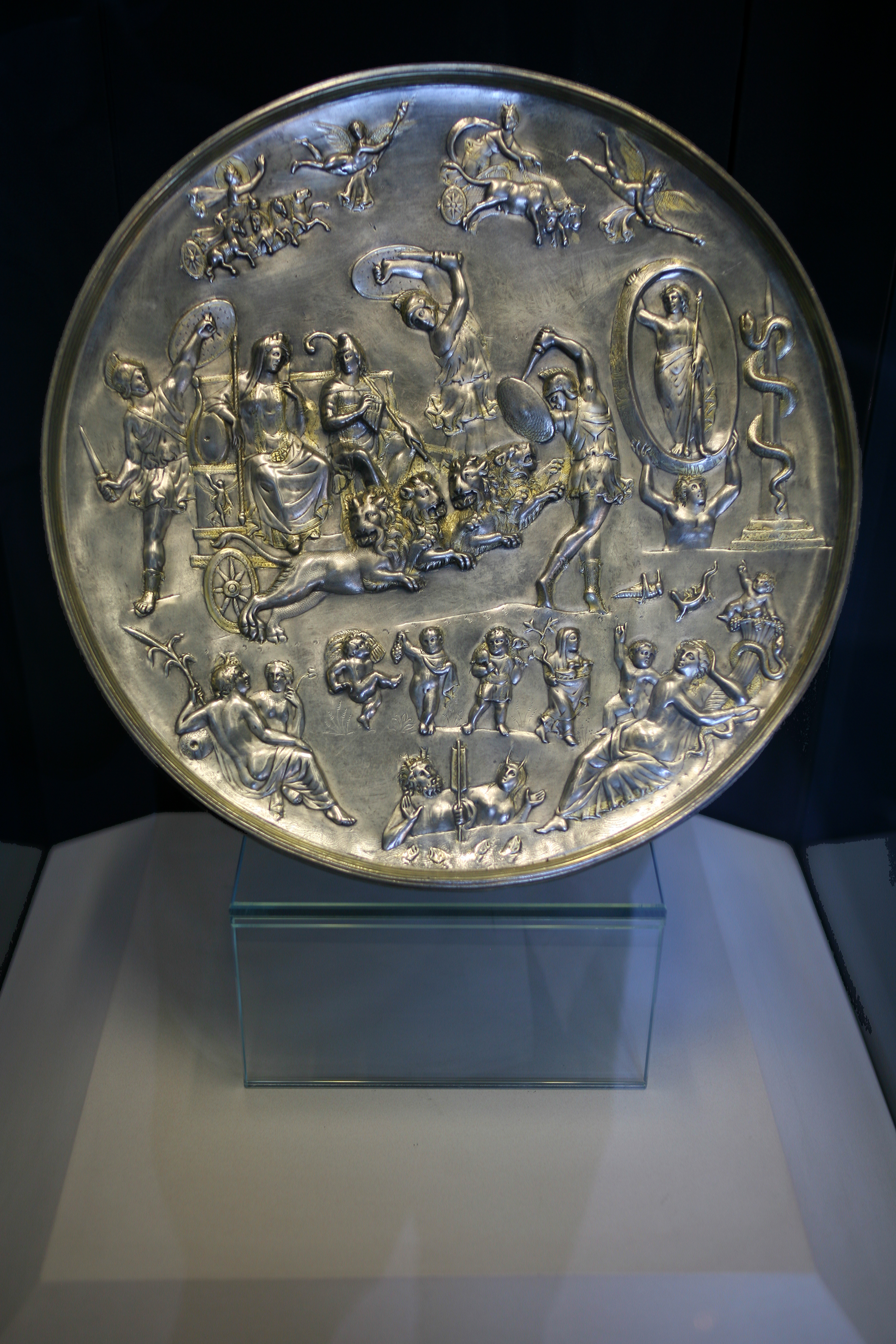
The gods Cybele and Adonis on the Parabiago Plate, an embossed silver plate housed in the Archaeological Museum of Milan.

The Mediolanum-Verbannus followed a primary southeast-to-northwest axis, with minor cart tracks branching off to connect villages and agricultural settlements.

It originated in Mediolanum, intersecting the Via Gallica, Via delle Gallie, Via Regina, Via Spluga, Via Mediolanum-Bellasium, Via Mediolanum-Bilitio, Via Mediolanum-Brixia, Via Mediolanum-Placentia, and Via Mediolanum-Ticinum near the Roman Porta Giovia (Latin: Porta Jovia), close to the modern Castello Sforzesco.

The road then headed northwest, skirting the eastern bank of the Olona’s artificial channel, passing through modern Pero, Rho (Latin: Rhaudum), Nerviano, Parabiago (Latin: Parablacum, notable in Roman times for the Parabiago Plate find), San Vittore Olona, and Legnano (Latin: Legnianum). Archaeological finds between Canegrate and Castellanza suggest a branch toward Saronno (Latin: Solomnum).

It reached modern Castegnate, a hamlet of Castellanza, crossing the Olona via a bridge to the western bank, continuing through Castellanza.

It then skirted Busto Arsizio, proceeded to Gallarate (Latin: Glaeratum), Cardano al Campo, passed near Arsago Seprio, and arrived at Somma Lombardo (Latin: Summa), where segments were unearthed in 1985 and 2002.

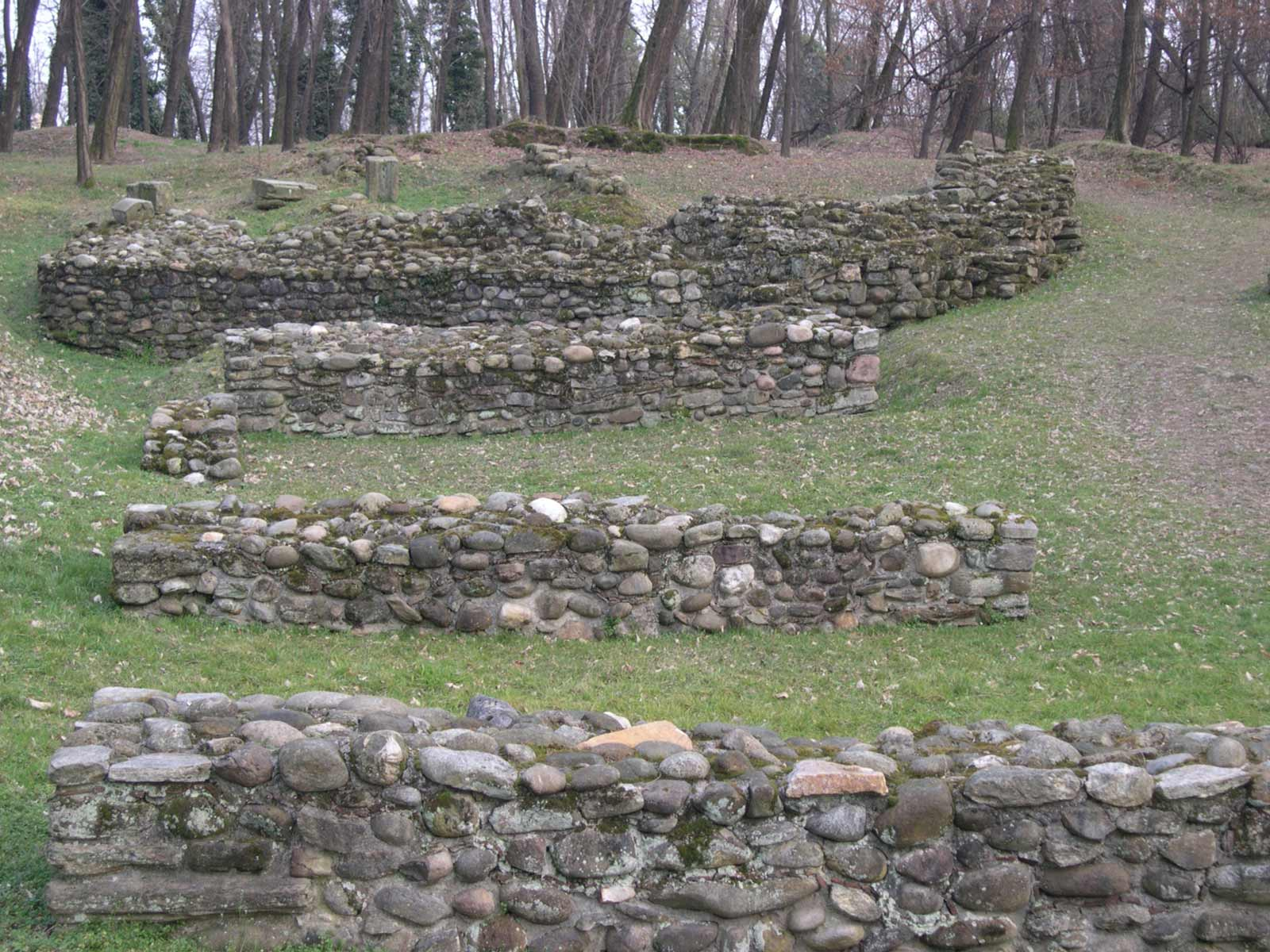
Entrance to the Roman castrum at Castelseprio.

South of Somma Lombardo, it intersected a Roman road linking Novara (Latin: Novaria) and Como (Latin: Comum) via Castelseprio (Latin: Sibrium).

From Somma Lombardo, it continued through Sesto Calende, splitting into two endpoints: one directly to Angera (Latin: Sebuinus) along the lakeshore, the other via a hilly route through Taino. Angera, a key Roman lake port on Verbano, facilitated trade with the Val d'Ossola, Muralto, and Bellinzona, accessing Alpine passes like the Novena, Lucomagno, and San Bernardino Pass.

Among routes from Milan to Switzerland, one branched from Sesto Calende, following the right bank of the Ticino through the Val d’Ossola to cross the Alps at the Simplon Pass or Arbola Pass. These challenging paths linked Cisalpine Gaul to the Rhône Valley.

A 19th-century hypothesis of a Roman bridge over the Ticino at Sesto Calende lacks archaeological support. The river’s shifting banks likely necessitated mobile crossings like ferries or pontoon bridges.

== Riverine Transport ==
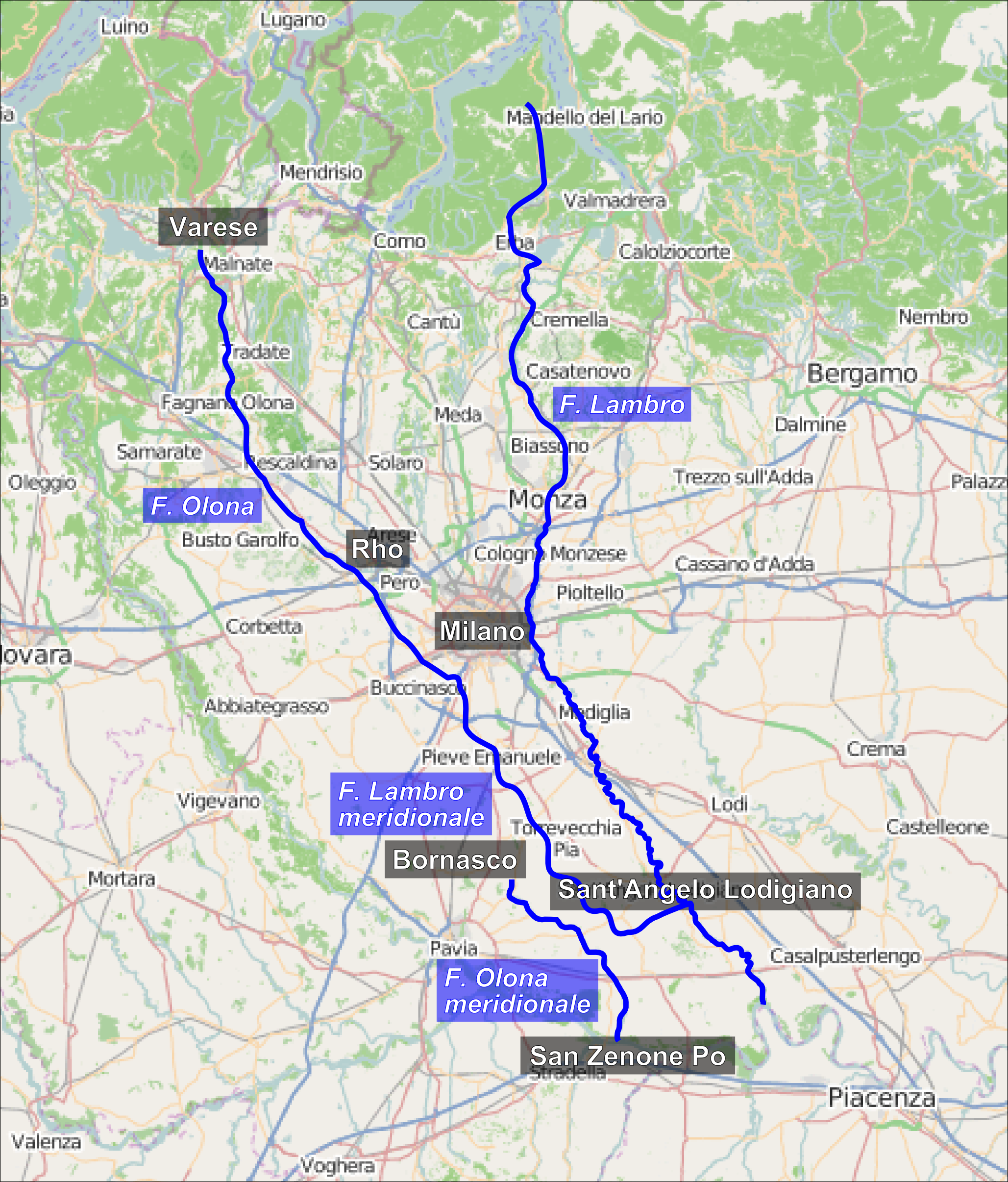
Paths of the Olona, Lambro Meridionale, and Olona meridionale rivers.

As noted, the Mediolanum-Verbannus’ terrestrial transport was integrated with extensive water routes utilizing Lombard lakes, the Olona River, and its tributaries.

In Roman times, barges on artificial channels could haul up to 500 quintals of goods, and 300 on river barges, compared to 8–20 quintals by land carts. Pliny the Elder described Northern Italy’s lakes as "immense" for their transport capacity:

[...] thirty are the rivers that the Po carries into the Adriatic, besides the immense lakes that empty into it [...]

— Pliny the Elder, Naturalis historia

Unlike the sea, lakes offered steady, moderate winds and calm waters, aiding ancient fluvial and lacustrine transport. In the Insubrian region, key lakes included Lake Maggiore (Latin: Verbanus lacus), Lake Monate (Latin: Monati lacus), Lake Lugano (Latin: Ceresius lacus), Lake Varese (Latin: Gavirati lacus), Lake Orta (Latin: Cusius lacus), and Lake Comabbio (Latin: Comavii lacus). Numerous streams, notably the Olona, supported this network. The Ticino (Latin: Ticinus) was another vital transport river. Southward, the Po connected Insubrian peoples to the Adriatic Sea and Mediterranean Sea.

The Olona was navigable from at least Legnano in Roman times. Other navigable streams included the Lura, Bozzente, and Nirone, all direct or indirect Olona affluents. To boost its capacity, the Romans redirected the Olona toward Milan and the Vettabbia. Originally, at Lucernate (a hamlet of Rho, Latin: Rhaudum), it flowed south naturally through modern Settimo Milanese (Latin: Septimus ab Urbe Lapis), bypassing Milan by several kilometers, following the modern Olona inferiore or meridionale (Latin: Olonna) to join the Po (Latin: Padus) at San Zenone.

The Romans diverted it at Lucernate, digging an artificial channel toward Milan alongside the Mediolanum-Verbannus. This integrated land-river system relied on draft animals towing barges upstream.

A waterway paralleling the road was deemed essential to boost trade, given barges’ superior capacity over land transport. This hydraulic feat coincided with the road’s construction in the early Common Era, spanning the late Republican era to the early Imperial era.

== Bibliography ==
- D'Ilario, Giorgio; Gianazza, Egidio; Marinoni, Augusto; Turri, Marco (1984). Profilo storico della città di Legnano. Edizioni Landoni.
- Dizionario di toponomastica: storia e significato dei nomi geografici italiani. UTET. 2006. ISBN 978-8-802-07228-9.
- Ferrarini, Gabriella; Stadiotti, Marco (2001). Legnano. Una città, la sua storia, la sua anima. Telesio editore.
- Miedico, Cristina (2014). "Sulla strada per Angera - Viabilità terrestre ed acquatica tra Milano e la Svizzera in età romana". In Facchinetti, Grazia; Miedico, Cristina (eds.). Di città in città – Insediamenti, strade e vie d'acqua da Milano alla Svizzera lungo la Mediolanum-Verbannus. Soprintendenza Archeologia della Lombardia. pp. 13–28. Archived from the original on February 16, 2017.
