= Bronzite =

Pyroxene mineral variety

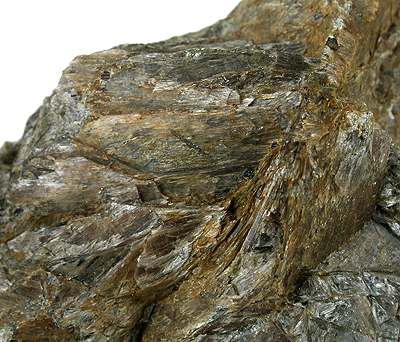
- Bronzite variety from the Bare Hills copper mine, Baltimore County, Maryland, USA (size: 9.6 x 7.5 x 4.9 cm)

General
- Category: Minerals
- Formula: (Mg,Fe^{2+})_{2}[SiO_{3}]_{2}

Identification

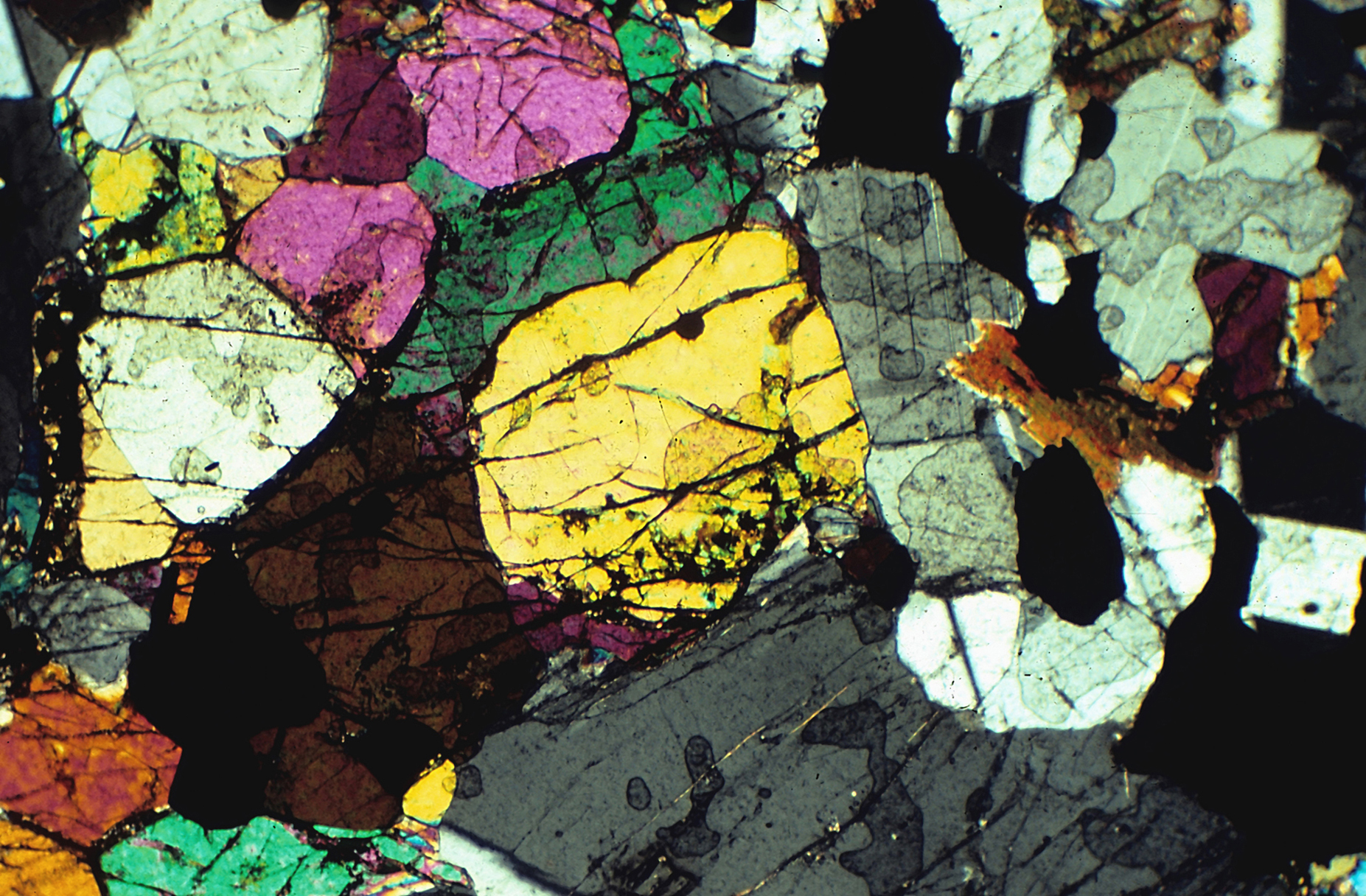
Bronzitite, thin section of a rock made of olivine and pyroxene, mostly bronzite. Photomicrograph, viewed with polarized light.

Bronzite is a member of the pyroxene group of minerals, belonging with enstatite and hypersthene to the orthorhombic series of the group. Rather than a distinct species, it is really a ferriferous variety of enstatite, which owing to partial alteration has acquired a bronze-like sub-metallic luster on the cleavage surfaces. It is named for its bronze-like luster on the cleavage surfaces.

Enstatite is magnesium silicate, MgSiO_{3}, with the magnesium partly replaced by small amounts (up to about 12%) of Fe^{2+}. In the bronzite variety, (Mg,Fe)SiO_{3}, the iron(II) oxide ranges from about 12 to 30%, and with still more iron there is a passage to hypersthene. The ferriferous varieties are liable to a particular kind of alteration, known as schillerization, which results in the separation of the iron as very fine films of oxide and hydroxides along the cleavage cracks of the mineral. The cleavage surfaces therefore exhibit a metallic sheen or schiller, which is even more pronounced in hypersthene than in bronzite. The color of bronzite is green or brown; its specific gravity is about 3.3–3.4, varying with the amount of iron present. The refractive indices and optic angle increase with iron content. The enstatite endmember has a positive optic sign, whereas bronzite and hypersthene both show a negative optic sign.

Like enstatite, bronzite is a constituent of many mafic to ultramafic igneous rocks, such as, norite, gabbro, and especially peridotite, and of the serpentinites which have been derived from them. It also occurs in some crystalline schist. Bronzitite, a pyroxenite of bronzite composition, is noted in the cumulate rocks of the Stillwater igneous complex of Montana.

== Ornamental usage ==
Bronzite is sometimes cut and polished, usually in convex forms, for small ornamental objects, but its use for this purpose is less extensive than that of hypersthene. It often has a more-or-less distinct fibrous structure, and when this is pronounced the sheen has a certain resemblance to that of cats-eye. Masses sufficiently large for cutting are found in the norite of the Kupferberg in the Fichtel Mountains, and in the serpentine of Kraubat near Leoben in Styria. In this connection mention may be made of an altered form of enstatite or bronzite known as bastite or schiller spar. Here, in addition to schillerization, the original enstatite has been altered by hydration and the product has the approximate composition of serpentine. In color bastite is brown or green with the same metallic sheen as bronzite. The typical locality is Baste in the Radauthal, Harz, where patches of pale greyish-green bastite are embedded in a darker-colored serpentine. This rock when cut and polished makes an effective decorative stone, although little used for that purpose.
