= Filippo Beltrami =

Italian resistance leader (1908–1944)

Filippo Maria Beltrami
- Born: 14 July 1908; Cireggio, Kingdom of Italy
- Died: 13 February 1944 (aged 35); Megolo, Italian Social Republic
- Military career
- Allegiance: Kingdom of Italy
- Branch: Royal Italian Army
- Rank: Captain
- Conflicts: World War II
- Awards: Gold Medal of Military Valour (posthumous)

Filippo Maria Beltrami (14 July 1908 – 13 February 1944) was an Italian officer and Resistance leader during World War II.

== Biography ==
He was born in Cireggio (today part of Omegna), and during his high school studies, he made friends with philosophers Eugenio Colorni and Piero Martinetti, who influenced his thinking. From 1932, after graduating in architecture, Beltrami established himself professionally in Milan following in the footsteps of his paternal great-uncle, architect Luca Beltrami, and in 1936, after less than three months of engagement, he married Giuliana Gadola, with whom he had three children, Luca, Giovanna and Michele.

After the outbreak of the Second World War, Beltrami was called up for military service and stationed as an officer in a horse artillery regiment in Lucca and Piacenza. In the summer of 1943, after the fall of the Fascist regime, Beltrami was promoted to captain in the 27th Artillery Regiment, stationed in Baggio. After the armistice of Cassibile, Beltrami moved from Milan to his native Cireggio, in a family villa, along with his wife and children. Being known in the area for his anti-fascist ideas, he was soon approached by some young Communists and quickly gathered a group of soldiers who had escaped the Germans, of which he assumed command, setting up a partisan group in the mountains of Valle Strona (southwestern Ossola); by December the group had grown to about 200 partisans.

In late January 1944, Beltrami's partisan group was repeatedly attacked by German and Fascist forces, and was forced to split up and retreat from Valle Strona to the village of Megolo, a hamlet of Pieve Vergonte. A German officer, sent from the German command of Meina, offered him a safe conduct in exchange for abandoning the fight, but Beltrami refused. In the morning of 13 February 1944, a column composed of troops of the 12th SS Police Regiment, led by Captain Ernst Simon, and of the National Republican Guard, led by Captain Renato Vanna, attacked Beltrami's group, now down to thirteen men, in their provisional base, a group of abandoned huts near Megolo. Severely outnumbered and outgunned, after several hours of fighting, all partisans were killed, including Beltrami, his deputy Antonio Di Dio, and the political commissar of the group, Gianni Citterio. Beltrami was posthumously awarded the Gold Medal of Military Valor, and another partisan group, the "Beltrami" Alpine Brigade, was named after him.
