= Pieve Vergonte =

- Comune
- Pieve Vergonte
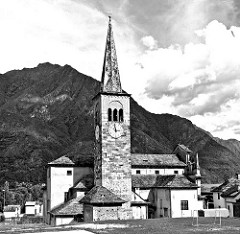

- Coat of arms

- Location within Italy Location within Piedmont
- Coordinates: 46.0045402°N 8.268456°E
- Country: Italy
- Region: Piedmont
- Province: Verbano-Cusio-Ossola (VB)
- Frazioni: Fomarco, Rumianca, Megolo Cima, Megolo Mezzo, Megolo Fondo

Government
  - Mayor: Maria Grazia Medali

Area
  - Total: 41.67 km^{2} (16.09 sq mi)
- Elevation: 232 m (761 ft)

Population (31 December 2021)
  - Total: 2,447
  - Density: 58.72/km^{2} (152.1/sq mi)
- Demonym: Pievesi
- Time zone: UTC+1 (CET)
  - Summer (DST): UTC+2 (CEST)
- Postal code: 28886
- Dialing code: 0324
- Patron saint: St. Vincent and St. Atanasius
- Saint day: 22 January
- Website: Official website

Pieve Vergonte is a comune (municipality) in the Province of Verbano-Cusio-Ossola in the Piedmont region of Italy. It is about 20 kilometres (12 mi) northwest of Verbania and 110 kilometres (68 mi) northeast of Turin.

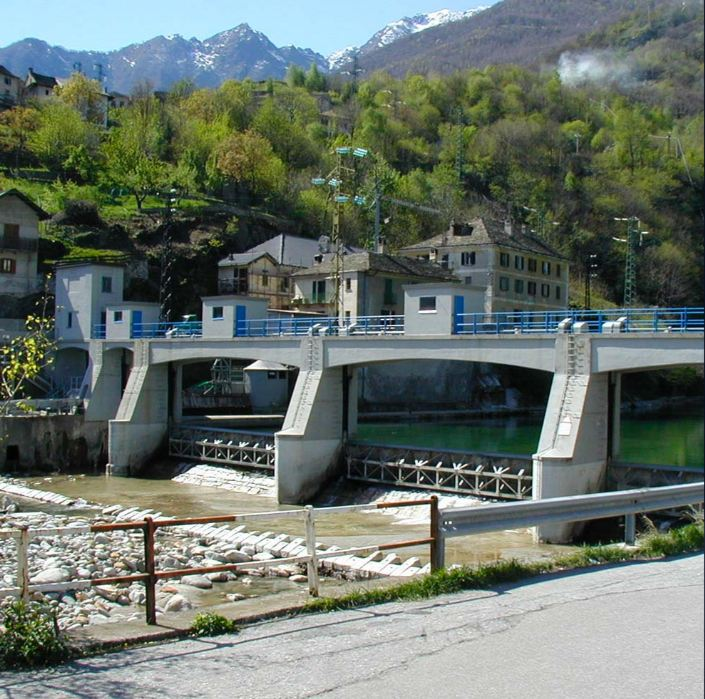

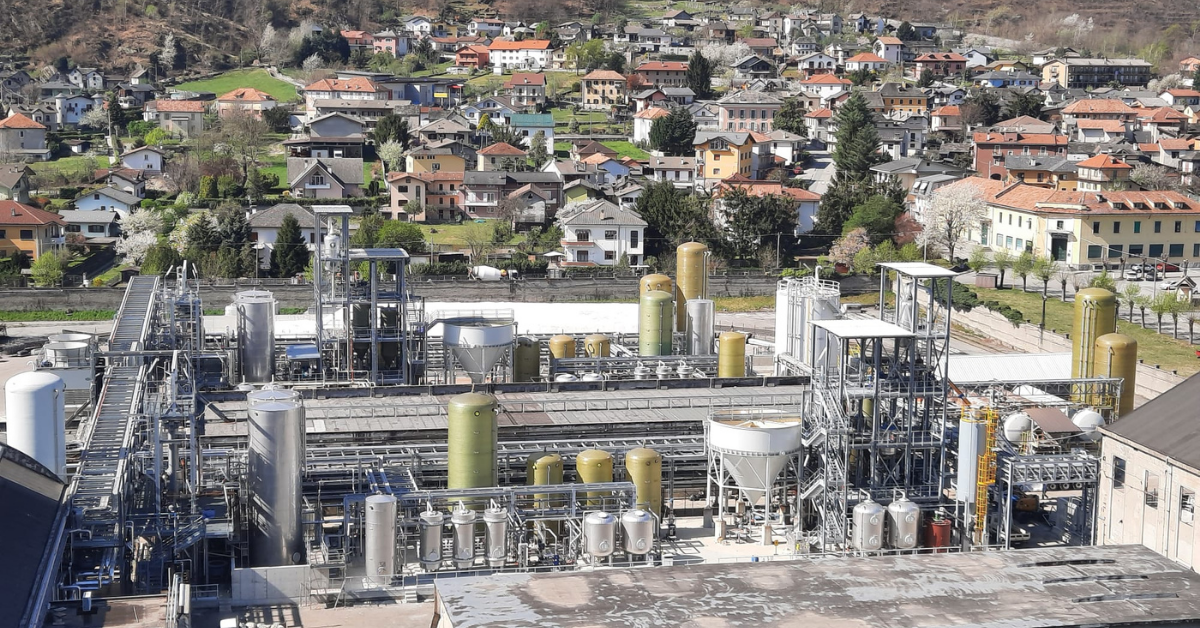

== Physical geography ==
Pieve Vergonte is located in lower Ossola, along the course of the Toce. Various watercourses are present in the municipal territory: Torrente Marmazza, the most important watercourse of Pieve Vergonte, Rio San Rocco, Rio Santa Maria, Rio Toietti, Rio della Fontana, Rio Valletta, Rio della Vallaccia, Rio called Lanca, Rio called Rialetto, Rio Arsa, Rio del Castello, Rio della Chiesa, Rio called Inferno, Rio Togni, Rio Mot. Branchis. The Rio della Taverna and Rio Fornate are present with an outlet in the Anzasca valley. The Rumianca Industrial Canal is an important work for the production of hydroelectric energy for industrial purposes. Lake Sant’Anna, in Loro hamlet, is linked to the Sant’Anna Fishermen’s Society. The watercourses registered in the public waters registry are: Rivo Valle dell’Inferno, Rivo di Megolo, Torrente Arsa, Rivo Vallaccia, Torrente Marmazza, Torrente Anza.

== Symbols ==
The coat of arms and banner of the Municipality of Pieve Vergonte were granted by decree of the President of the Republic on 5 November 1981.

== History ==
=== From Celtic tribes to the Roman Empire ===
The area of Northern Italy where today's Pieve Vergonte stands was known to the Romans as Gallia Transpadana, indicating that territory of Cisalpine Gaul comprised between the Alps and the Po river, and the ancient peoples who dwelt there were considered Gauls. The most relevant population of the area were the Insubres, from which the denomination of Insubria, while it seems that in the lands of the municipality of Pieve Vergonte were settled the Agoni, of which trace remains in the name of the Agogna river and the city of Vogogna.

About a century later, the Romans were threatened with losing their conquests in the Gaul by an invasion of the Cimbri, who descended into Italy together with their allies the Teutones. The consuls Gaius Marius and Quintus Lutatius Catulus were sent at the head of a large army to stop them at the outlet of the Alps. Marius headed towards Provence while Catulus went to Ossola, ascending along the Atisone, today called Toce, and here he fortified himself in two castles, which as recounted by Plutarch in the life of Marius, should not have been very distant from ancient Vergunto, village placed where today's Pieve Vergonte stands, and from Vogogna, placed one on this side, the other on that side of the Atisone.

The high number of Cimbri invaders forced the Romans to retreat, leaving only a small garrison in the fortifications, which was, however, easily defeated. The Cimbri, travelling through the valleys to the plain between the Sesia and the Ticino, crossing the territory of Borgomanero, clashed with the Romans in the countryside of Vercelli, on this side of the Sesia. The Battle of the Raudine Plain of 101 BC (653 a.U.c.), which occurred near present-day Peltrengo in the municipality of Casalino, was particularly bloody and marked the end of the Cimbri invasion.

The ancient Simplon road was traced in the contiguous territory of Vogogna and built east of the Atisone river directed towards Cardezza, Beura, Masera, Montecrestese, up to Ponte Maglio with which it passes to the opposite bank, still towards Crevola entering the Deveria valley and continuing to Iselle to Algabio and Simplon.

A Roman inscription, placed at Vogogna, indicates the restoration of the road in 196, under emperor Septimius Severus, with a text severely damaged in which one reads:

"QUIA FACTA EX......HS XIII DCC DOMITIO DEXTRO II P..... FUSCO COSS M VALERIO OPTATO.C.VALERIO.THALETE CURATORIBUS.OPERI.DATIS.IMPERIO.VENUSTI.CONDIANI. PROC.ALP.ATRECT.MARMOREIS CREPIDINIBUS.MUNITA".

In the second line of the inscription are cited Gaius Domitius Dexter and Publius Fuscus, consuls in the year 196 (948 a.U.c.).

The Goths dominion period
After the dismissal of Belisarius, general of the Roman Empire of the East, at war for the Byzantines against the Goths; Narses, general of the Roman Empire of the East, commands the expedition of the year 551 against the Goths, with the help of many Germanic mercenaries, including 2,500 Lombard warriors, the future invaders of Italy. The dominion of the Ostrogoths in Italy, including Pieve Vergonte, ended following the military defeat of King Totila, who clashed with Narses at Busta Gallorum at Tagina (Gualdo Tadino) in July 552, was defeated and died in flight. The authentic proof of Gothic Ossola, including Pieve Vergonte, is the hoards of Greco-Gothic coins from Finero (Verbania Repertoire 4980), a treasure of gold coins and jewels, while the hoards of Masera (Domodossola Repertoire 5010), are only of silver and already of Lombard origin.

=== Middle Ages ===
Lombard Kingdom period

The Lombards, led by king Alboin in 569 passed into Italy. Paul the Deacon recounts in the Historia Langobardorum:

Habitaverunt autem in Pannoniam Annis quadraginta duobus. De qua egressi sunt mense Aprili, per indictionem Vai alla Alio Die Post Pascha sanctum, cuius festivitas eo anno iuxta calcoli rationem Ipsis Kalendis Aprilibus fuit, cum iam un incarnatione Domini Anni Quingenti sexaginta octo Essent evoluti.

In autumn 569, Alboin conquered Milan, where he was proclaimed king of Italy by his people (dominus Italiae), while Pavia was able to resist until 571, when it fell under Lombard dominion together with Vergunto (Pieve Vergonte). In 584, faced with the real threat of a Frankish invasion, the Lombards promoted King Authari and his successor, Agilulf (590-616).

Liutprand, king of the Lombards, successor of his father Ansprand, on whose throne he ascended in 712, was of Catholic faith and proved himself a builder and restorer of churches in Pavia and elsewhere. He founded the Monastery of San Pietro in Ciel d'Oro around the year 728, to which he made a gift of an estate, such Coro Vergonto, with the right to fish in the Atosa river (Toce), later reconfirmed by Conrad the Salic in 1033 (antiq. Italia. T. I.Col.596) The Lombard dominion of Italy and of Pieve Vergonte ended with king Desiderius who when king Aistulf died without heirs (756), was proclaimed his successor and could ascend to the throne through the intervention of Pope Stephen II.

Desiderius’s daughter, Desiderata (also called Ermengarde), married Charlemagne, the Frankish king, in 770 as part of an alliance. However, Charlemagne repudiated her in 771, escalating tensions. The death of Charlemagne’s brother Carloman in 771 left Charlemagne free to focus on Italy, especially after Pope Adrian I’s call for aid against Desiderius. Desiderius’s aggressive moves, including threats against Rome, prompted Charlemagne to intervene, fearing the loss of prestige if Rome fell to the Lombards

In 773, Pope Adrian I, facing Desiderius’s threats, sought military support from Charlemagne. Charlemagne invaded Italy, defeating Desiderius’s forces at Susa and besieging Pavia, the Lombard capital. Desiderius’s son, Adelchis, attempted to resist from Verona but was forced to surrender the city to Frankish troops. He fled to the Byzantine Empire, seeking refuge and later attempting to reclaim the kingdom with Byzantine support, but he was unsuccessful. After a nine-month siege, Pavia fell in June 774. Desiderius surrendered and was deposed. Charlemagne, in a groundbreaking move, took the title Gratia Dei rex Francorum et Langobardorum (“By the grace of God king of the Franks and the Lombards”), becoming the first Germanic ruler to adopt the title of a conquered kingdom. This marked the end of the Lombard Kingdom in northern Italy. The conquest ended two centuries of Lombard rule in northern Italy, integrating the region into the Carolingian Empire. The region retained the name Lombardy, reflecting the Lombard legacy. Pieve Vergonte became part of the Carolingian Empire.

Charlemagne and Carolingian Empire period
The Carolingian Empire, founded by Charlemagne, reached its height after his coronation as “Emperor of the Romans” by Pope Leo III on 25 December 800, in Rome. This event revived the idea of a Western Roman Empire, with Charlemagne as a Christian emperor ruling over much of Western Europe (modern-day France, Germany, and northern Italy, including Pieve Vergonte. After Charlemagne’s death in 814, the empire was divided among his heirs under the Treaty of Verdun (843), leading to fragmentation. The imperial title persisted but weakened, passing through various Carolingian rulers until it lapsed in the West with the death of Emperor Charles the Fat in 888 and later Berengar I in 924, when no emperor was crowned.

In the year 918 Vergunto and the neighboring lands, including fishing and hunting rights, appear as property of the ancient monastery of San Pietro in Ciel d'Oro in Pavia, as can be seen from imperial diplomas that confirm previous donations made by the Lombard king Liutprand in the 8th century and by subsequent emperors. The diploma that gives certainty is of King Berengar, in which one reads:

...et silc. corroboramus, oia quesca Ecclia possidet, in Epatu Nocariae in Oxola que dr. Vergunti et misendone et in villa et in monte cristeso et in murade et in varenzasca et in baci et in devere et in finole et in antigorio et piscaria que est in Tuxa et in valensasca, seselle cum ecclia in ibi fundata in honore santa marie et...

The Holy Roman Empire period
In 962, Otto I was crowned “Emperor of the Romans” by Pope John XII in Rome on 2 February, marking the foundation of what later became known as the Holy Roman Empire. This event is conventionally seen as the starting point of the Holy Roman Empire, though the term “Holy Roman Empire” was not used until the 13th century (under Frederick Barbarossa). Otto’s coronation revived the imperial tradition begun by Charlemagne, but his empire was centred in East Francia (Germany) and northern Italy, distinct from the broader Carolingian Empire. Otto I’s coronation was significant because it reestablished a Western emperor recognised by the papacy, claiming continuity with the Roman and Carolingian imperial traditions. Unlike the Carolingian Empire, which included West Francia (modern France), the Holy Roman Empire was primarily Germanic and Italian in scope, including Pieve Vergonte.

In the year 1004 Henry II, king of Germany from 1002, descended into Italy, where Arduin of Ivrea had himself crowned king, and forced him to flee by girding himself with the royal crown of Italy at Pavia. Following clashes between Italians and Germans, Henry II had to abandon Rome and, passing through Tuscany and Lombardy, return to Germany. During this journey, he dispensed the broadest favours and privileges to the churches and especially to the bishops of Novara and Vercelli. The Emperor rewarded Bishop Peter of Novara, for the constant fidelity shown to him and in consideration of the damages suffered during the dominion of Arduin. In reward, therefore, for his abnegation and restoration of so many damages suffered by him, the Emperor granted a small county in the Ossola Valley. Pieve Vergonte was transferred into the power and under the jurisdiction of the Church

Conradus, etc. Cenobio S.Petri, quod dicitur Coleum Aureum, subvenire et nostra preceptali auctoritate confirmare et corroborare omnes cortes et proprietates, quas pridem per quodvis ingenium donoscitur possedisse... et omnia, quae in Monte Ferrato, et quae in Comitati Vercellensi et Yporegiensi, et quae in Novariensi ad eundem locum pertinent... et illas terras que habere visum est in Belingo et in Liventina, cum omnibus suis pertinentiis; cortem insuper, quae Vergonto dicitur, et Piscariam, quae est in Tauxa etc (Muratori, Antiq.Med.Aevi, I, 595)

This is the text of the most precious document, preserved in the Capitular Archive of Santa Maria in Novara (Novara, Diocesan Historical Archive, A.C. N, 27).

To these facts of Italy is added the history of Pieve Vergonte, as on 12 July 1006 in the castle of the Island of San Giulio, Peter III, bishop of Novara, granted to one Grimaldo for 29 years half of four farms located in the territory of Anzola belonging to the goods of the parish church of San Vincenzo of Vergonte, for the annual rent of one hundred pounds of cheese. In 1006, the four farms and six colonists were pertaining to the parish church of Vergonte, even if administered by the Bishop, who, according to a formula in use at that time, enjoyed the goods but provided for the needs of that church proportionally to the fruits. A bond already strong in 1006, but which dated back to an earlier era and united Anzola to the most ancient parish of San Vincenzo of Vergonte. The six farmers of the church of Vergonte (Domenico, Lupo, Martino, Domenico, Giovanni Battista and Albino) who in 1006 worked the four farms of which the land of Anzola was composed, probably descended from the first colonists settled by the Parish of Vergonte or by the Monastery of San Pietro in Ciel d'Oro of Pavia, which appears to have possessed in those times lands and fisheries in other places of the valley. The colonists lived off the products of agriculture and livestock, as revealed by the rent established in cheese - one hundred pounds - to be paid every year in the days preceding or following the feast of Saint Andrew (November 30): deadline postponed compared to that of Saint Martin (November 11), traditionally fixed as the end of the agricultural year.

The Investiture Controversy (1075–1122) between emperors and popes weakened imperial control. The conflict, sparked by disputes over appointing bishops, empowered Italian cities, as both sides sought their support. The Concordat of Worms (1122) resolved the issue but reduced imperial influence over the Church, a key administrative arm in Italy. Cities like Milan, Florence, and Venice grew wealthy through trade, agriculture, and crafts, fostering a merchant class that demanded greater autonomy. By the late 11th century, northern Italian cities began forming comuni—self-governing entities led by elected consuls from the merchant and noble classes. Milan, Genoa, Pisa, and Bologna were among the earliest, with Milan emerging as a leader by 1097. Communes arose due to weak imperial and feudal control, economic growth, and the need for collective defence against external threats, including imperial intervention.

Emperor Frederick I Barbarossa (r. 1155–1190) sought to reassert imperial authority in northern Italy, demanding taxes and control over city governance. His campaigns (1154–1183) provoked resistance, led by the Lombard League, a coalition of cities including Milan, Bergamo, and Brescia, formed in 1167 with papal support. The League defeated Frederick at the Battle of Legnano (1176), a landmark victory for communal autonomy. The Peace of Constance (1183) granted cities the right to self-governance, including electing magistrates and managing finances, while nominally recognising imperial overlordship. This marked a significant step toward independence.

By the early 13th century, comuni were effectively independent, managing their own laws, militias, and foreign policies. Cities like Florence, Siena, and Venice developed sophisticated governments, with podestà (external magistrates) hired to mediate factional disputes. However, internal conflicts between Guelphs (pro-papal) and Ghibellines (pro-imperial) and class struggles between nobles (magnati) and merchants (popolo) destabilized communes, paving the way for signorial rule

By the mid-13th century, factionalism and external threats weakened communal governments. The struggle between Guelphs and Ghibellines, exacerbated by Emperor Frederick II’s campaigns (1212–1250), led to power vacuums in many cities. Strongmen, often Ghibelline nobles or military leaders, seized control as signori (lords), promising stability. Cities like Verona (under the Della Scala family) and Ferrara (under the Este family) transitioned from communes to hereditary lordships.

The Visconti, a noble Ghibelline family, emerged in Milan during the 13th century. They initially held ecclesiastical power, with Ottone Visconti appointed Archbishop of Milan in 1262 by Pope Urban IV, despite resistance from the pro-Guelph Della Torre family. Ottone defeated the Della Torre at the Battle of Desio (1277), securing control of Milan. He became the city’s de facto lord, marking the transition from communal to signorial rule. His nephew, Matteo I Visconti, succeeded him in 1287.

Matteo expanded Visconti influence over Lombardy, capturing cities like Bergamo and Vercelli. His rule marked Milan’s transformation into a regional power, with the Visconti establishing hereditary control, formalised when Matteo’s son Galeazzo I succeeded him. In 1311, Emperor Henry VII briefly restored imperial authority in Italy, confirming Matteo as vicar, but his death in 1313 and subsequent papal excommunication of Matteo (1317) underscored the Visconti’s reliance on local power rather than imperial backing.

In the year 1301, on 20 September, Francesco Scaciga della Silva writes in his History of Ossola Valley:

Leonardo da Perazzo who such was the name of the Ossolan Vicar before whom the disputes were pending, and who held his tribunal under the cover of Pietra Santa, in the village of Vergonte...

In the year 1348, on 9 February, the village of Pietrasanta, born following the destruction of ancient Vergunto and preceding the creation of Pieve Vergonte, was destroyed by a flood of the Anza torrent. At that time Pietrasanta was capital of Lower Ossola and ordinary seat of the tribunal for the entire District. Francesco Scaciga della Silva reports again in his History of Ossola Valley:

The river or torrent as one wishes to call it, of Anza, which starting from the ice of Monte Rosa runs through the entire Valley, to carry the whitish waters into the bosom of the Toce, changed so much its course and advanced with such precipice into the country, that the damage no longer had remedy.

Pieve Vergonte was still the remains of the most ancient village of Vergonte, which was submerged by a terrible irruption of the Marmazza torrent around the 5th century of the common era. Always Scaciga della Silva reports:

The code of Novarese statutes makes us certain that when Domodossola, Vogogna, Valle Antigorio, Ornavasso and Mergozzo brought to the feast of Saint Gaudenzo in Novara, only four and a half pounds of wax among all, Pietra Santa alone sent a full eight pounds.

Above the hamlet of Megolo, there was a small castle, which already served as a signalling place on the behaviour of the enemy in the time of the Ferraris factions of Lower Ossola and Spilorcia of Upper Ossola.

Rumianca was included in the Lordship of Vogogna and became a fief of a branch of the Borromeo family, owner of the boat port through which one crossed the Toce

By the mid-14th century, under Azzone Visconti (r. 1329–1339) and his successors, the Visconti transformed Milan into the dominant power in northern Italy, absorbing cities like Pavia (1359) and Bologna. They ruled as signori, later claiming ducal titles from Emperor Charles IV (1355), signalling the eclipse of communal autonomy. The Visconti’s success lay in their ability to exploit communal factionalism, secure imperial titles for legitimacy, and build a centralised administration, paving the way for the Duchy of Milan under Gian Galeazzo Visconti (r. 1378–1402).

=== Modern Age ===
In 1421 Filippo Maria Visconti (Milan 1392 - there 1447), duke of Milan, son of Gian Galeazzo and Caterina Visconti, wanted to secure also the outlets by occupying, with the help of Carmagnola, Genoa, the valleys of Domodossola, including Pieve Vergonte, and Bellinzona, threatened by the German Swiss. In 1422, at the plain of Arbedo, a battle was fought which saw the victory of the militias of Filippo Maria Visconti, commanded by Carmagnola, over the Swiss. As a consequence, the Swiss border returned to the Alpine watershed. On 20 January 1490 the separation of the Church of San Gottardo of Castiglione in Valle Anzasca occurred, from the parish church of San Vincenzo of Vergonte and its erection as a parish:

’‘Quod cum ipsi positi existunt intra limites parochialis ac matricis ecclesiae S.Vincentii de Plebe Verguntis ejusdem Novariensis Diocesis, coguntur as nos, ne nostram sedem episcopalem Novariensem, pro subsidio, ac necessario suffragio habere recursum: maxime cum ipsi homines ab aliquibus annis citra ex urgenti causa, pro animarum eorum salute in loco de Castilliono territori Drocalae, ecclesiam, seu Basilicam erexerunt, sub vocabulo S.Gottardi, eo quod distant a dicta terra de plebe Vergunti…’’

In the year 1525 following the Battle of Pavia between the army of France led by king Francis I and the army of the Holy Roman Empire led by Charles V Habsburg, the regions of Northern Italy, including the Duchy of Milan, Ossola and Pieve Vergonte were transferred to the House of Habsburg. In the year 1555, following the abdication of Charles V, the Empire was divided between his son Philip II and his brother Ferdinand I. Ossola and with it Pieve Vergonte passed under the administration of the king of Spain, Philip II, and Spanish it would remain for the following 159 years. The Peace of Augsburg was concluded on 25 September 1555 between Emperor Charles V and the German princes; it ended the Thirty-Year religious War in Germany. The peace sanctioned the right of princes to choose according to conscience the religious confession, with the obligation for their subjects to adopt the same religion ‘’(cuius regio, eius religio’’ «whose [is] the region, his [be] the religion»). Pieve Vergonte, under the dominion of a Catholic king, remained by right, a land of Catholic faith. Following the War of Spanish Succession (1701-1714) concluded with the peace treaty of Utrecht (1713) and specifically the treaty of Peace of Rastatt (1714), the King of Spain Philip V was forced to cede the Kingdom of Naples, the Kingdom of Sardinia, the State of Presidi and much of the Duchy of Milan to emperor Charles VI. Ossola and with it Pieve Vergonte followed the political destiny of the Duchy of Milan, passing under Austrian administration. Following the War of Austrian Succession (1740-1748) and the related Treaty of Worms of 1743 and the Treaty of Aix-la-Chapelle of 1748 which ended the conflict, the Kingdom of Sardinia acquired among the numerous territories, that of Ossola, including Pieve Vergonte. The King of England, the Queen of Bohemia and Hungary, Empress of the Holy Roman Empire and the King of Sardinia stipulated a military alliance on English initiative with the cession of territories under Austrian control to the Kingdom of Sardinia, which moved the border to Lake Maggiore and along the Ticino river until its entrance into the Po river. After 29 years of Austrian government, Pieve Vergonte passed to the lands of House Savoy, whose destinies it would follow until its fall. In the year 1775, King Victor Amadeus III approved, with Patent 6 June 1775, the new Regulation for municipal administrations. The community of Vogogna was considered too extensive, so the ancient Municipality of Vogogna, originally constituted by ten lands, was divided into six distinct and separate Municipalities: Vogogna with Prata; Pallanzeno; Piedimulera; Cimamulera; Fomarco; Rumianca with the hamlets of Megolo, Loro and Pieve Vergonte.

=== Contemporary era ===
In the year 1800, Napoleon descended into Italy and, with a proclamation of 15 October, reorganised upper and lower Novara into the department of Agogna. With the law of 2 November 1800, Ossola was administratively dependent on the Compartment of Agogna, subdivided into 17 districts. Vogogna, declared capital of District XIV, still maintained its ancient jurisdiction over Lower Ossola and the Anzasca Valley with 26 municipalities, including Fomarco. The decree of 8 June 1805 on Public Administration and territorial compartmentalisation of the Kingdom of Italy, whose capital was Milan, subdivided the Kingdom into departments, districts, cantons and municipalities. Pieve Vergonte, a fraction of the municipality of Rumianca, together with the municipalities of Pallanzeno, Piedimulera, Cimamulera, Anzino, Valle Anzasca, Fomarco, Anzola, Migiandone, Ornavasso, Mergozzo, Cuzzago and Premosello, was part of the Canton of Vogogna, which was its capital. In the year 1847, Pieve Vergonte was still a fraction of Rumianca to which the fractions of Megolo and Loro also belonged. In the year 1847, it was still written of Rumianca that

”…the little plain suitable for cultivation is devastated by the Torrents Marmazza, Anza, and Inferno, which descend precipitously from the mountains above, and flow into the Toce these in their floods cause much damage to the countryside, threaten the ruin of the villages through which they pass and it is very burdensome for this municipality to restrain their impetus by means of appropriate embankments. A chain of mountains stands behind the places of which the Municipality is composed: on the ridge of these can be seen many chestnut groves, and in several sites there are also many tall trees, nor are there lacking pastures to feed numerous livestock. The territory produces rye, corn, millet, chestnuts and grapes in discrete quantities, the products of bovine and woolly beasts is quite considerable”.

In the year 1861, with the birth of the Kingdom of Italy, Ossola and with it Pieve Vergonte passed under the administration of the Province of Novara.

In the year 1928, the Municipality of Fomarco and the Municipality of Rumianca were definitively suppressed and united into a single Municipality with the name “Pieve Vergonte”, having a population of 1,916 inhabitants. The seats of the suppressed Municipalities were abandoned. During the Second World War the mountainous territories around Pieve Vergonte, like those of all Val d’Ossola, witnessed important partisan activity, particularly of the formation of commander Filippo Beltrami, one of the first to arise in the area between Cusio and Ossola, which at the end of January 1943 had placed its temporary base in the Pieve territory, in the locality of Cortavolo, just above the fraction of Megolo Mezzo. On 13 February 1944, this area was the theatre of the battle of Megolo, between Beltrami’s partisan group and Nazi-fascist troops of the German army and the Italian Social Republic coming from Domodossola and Novara, under the orders of Captain Ernst Simon. After a sabotage action on the railway line, in which Beltrami himself had participated, which took place on the night of February 12, the partisan squad had returned to the Cortavolo base. The German and Italian Social Republic vehicles arrived in Megolo around six in the morning of February 13 and occupied the village, entering house by house, beating men and women suspected of having relations with the partisans and taking hostages among the inhabitants. Three partisans found in Megolo were shot on the spot. Before the news reached the partisan command, Germans and fascists of the Italian Social Republic had already managed to surround the area and place heavy weapons; Commander Beltrami nevertheless chose to resist to the end, and the group took combat positions. The clash lasted all morning and in the end the German and Italian Social Republic troops, superior in number (60 partisans against 150 between Germans and republicans) and better armed, had the upper hand. During the day, between battle and execution, commander Filippo Beltrami fell, political commissar Gianni Citterio, vice-commander Antonio Di Dio and nine other partisans: Carlo Antibo, Giovanni Bressani Bassano, Aldo Carletti, Angelo Clavena, Bartolomeo Creola, Emilio (or Cornelio) Gorla, Paolo Marino, Gaspare Pajetta and Elio Toninelli. The rest of the group managed to retreat to the mountains.

In the Resistance are also to be remembered the Pieve partisan Mario Massari, belonging to the Antonio Di Dio brigade, who fell at twenty-one years old on October 11, 1944 in a clash with German and republican soldiers near Migiandone, in the territory of Ornavasso, to whom the municipality of Pieve Vergonte has dedicated a street, and the Pieve native Ester Maimeri Paoletti, the “blue courier”, young daughter of the director of Rumianca and niece of architect Paolo Vietti-Violi, who driven by the Nazi-fascist atrocities she had witnessed and by threats against her father, maintained contacts between the partisans and the management of the Rumianca plant that helped them, carrying messages for the partisan groups operating in Ossola and Cusio, particularly the Catholic groups. On 9 May 1945 there was recorded in Pieve Vergonte, in Val d’Ossola, the execution by firing squad of 11 militiamen of the Italian Social Republic by partisan forces: Canapa Angelo Francesco (Carrara 18.10.1925), Conti Angelo (Roma 11.1.1893), Di Giovanni Carlo (Roma 25.9.1894), Francia Michele (Velletri 3.9.1900), Micale Salvatore (Taviano 2.12.1919), Cerchi Dino, De Deo Giuseppe (Civitavecchia 16.12.1910), Perlini Vittorio (Frosinone 1.1.1902), Princigalli Giovanni, Tesoro Alfredo (Terlizzi 14.10.1927) and his brother Tesoro Giuseppe (Terlizzi 24.8.1925). A civilian was also shot, Serafini Amelia (Macerata 29.6.1901). These militiamen belonged to the Ministerial Black Brigade, a unit brought to Val d’Ossola after the reoccupation of the territory of the Partisan Republic in October 1944. The Ministerial Black Brigade was born following the imminent fall of Rome in 1944, by Benito Mussolini and Alessandro Pavolini, Secretary of the Republican Fascist Party, who militarised the Republican Fascist Party, transforming the provincial formations into Black Brigades. On 27 August 1944, the Chief of Staff of the Black Brigades, Giovanni Battista Riggio, distributed a circular addressed to state and ministerial employees in which he hoped for their voluntary enrollment in the brigades. In turn, Pavolini announced on 17 September 1944, the constitution of special ministerial departments, thus was born the Autonomous Ministerial Black Brigade, based in Brescia (Field Post 704) and which obtained the greatest success among the officials of the Ministries of Finance and Popular Culture On 21 February 1945, the execution by firing squad of two civilians by partisans at Pieve Vergonte is recorded, Gavazzi Rosina and Gavazzi Luciana. They are respectively the wife and daughter of Gavazzi Luciano, Gold Medal for military valour and battalion commander who fell in 1941, during the war in East Africa. Gavazzi Luciano was 1st Senior (CC.NN., CLXIV battalion CC. NN.) to whom was conferred in 1941 a Gold Medal posthumously with the following motivation: :{{{1}}} {{{1}}}as Commander of CC. NN. battalion and vice commander of the defence of Uolchefit, though weakened by serious illness, gave in every difficult contingency the most brilliant example of pure faith, sacred enthusiasm and precious, intelligent activity. Several times, he invoked the honour of testing himself in open field against the overwhelming enemy forces, and on 13 July, commanding a column of nationals operating in the Amberco zone, he fulfilled this task with full success by virtue of his great daring and sublime contempt for danger. On 1 August, though suffering, he assumed command of another column in the assault on Giramba, and the bloody attack having been frustrated by enemy mines and barbed wire, he knew how to disengage brilliantly despite the arriving enemy masses threatening dangerously on the flank. He then led his men again in a furious counterattack, thus managing to restore the situation. Undermined in his unsteady health by fatigue and hardships and struck by sudden, inexorable disease, he then ascended to the heaven of heroes. Elect spirit of a soldier, decorated several times for valour, squadrist of purest faith, he was with sacred enthusiasm, the soul of the defence of that distant strip of Italian land. Uolchefit, (A.O.), April - August 1941’’.’’ On 25 April 1945, with the war not yet concluded, partisans assassinated three civilians in Pieve Vergonte: Mr. Casella and Mrs. Calvi, residents in Pieve Vergonte, and Mr. Bettineschi resident in Fomarco. Mr. Casella and Mrs. Calvi were temporarily buried at Alpe Piana, in Val Toppa, above the town of Pieve Vergonte. Mr. Bettineschi was temporarily buried inside a mine gallery at Alpe Fontano, in Val Toppa, above the town of Pieve Vergonte.

At the beginning of April 1945, a German chemist was captured by the Garibaldini partisans of Megolo. This chemist was anti-Nazi and supported the excuses for the continuous delays in the production of a powerful chemical weapon manufactured at Rumianca. He had been assigned to oversee the operations of several chemical plants, including Rumianca. On 10 April 1945, a partisan commando unit was sent to Megolo with orders to escort him to Command headquarters for a prisoner exchange. He attempted to escape, and a partisan killed him by shooting him in the back. He was buried in great secrecy in a field, but following complaints from the landowner, his body was moved, still in great secrecy, to the cemetery. The partisan commander, Baron Alessandro Cavalchini (code name "Sandro"), who held monarchist convictions, notified the family after the war ended. In 1978, in Anzola, the restoration of the Chapel of the Holy Crucifix was inaugurated, a restoration donated, together with a Crucifix and a plaque with words from the donor, by Alessandro Cavalchini.

== Economy ==
=== Industry ===
The town is home to an important and historic chemical industry (Pieve Vergonte Chemical Plant). The industrial site of Pieve Vergonte covers a total area of 395,617 m². The Pieve Vergonte industrial plant was established in 1915 on the initiative of industrialists represented by the Italian Society for Explosive Products (SIPE), headquartered in Milan with a share capital of 2,500,000 Lire. Construction of the site began under the chemical company Dr. Vitale with the creation of a Krebbs cell chlor-alkali plant designed to produce materials commissioned by the War Ministry. The first production was for military purposes, manufacturing iodine monochloride, chlorobenzene, and phosgene used during World War I and later in the African campaign. To improve living and working conditions for employees, the Company established a Cooperative, company canteen, and built and purchased various housing units. It negotiated an agreement with the State Railways for the construction of a railway station with direct connection to the plant. Communication routes were improved in agreement with the municipalities of Rumianca and Fomarco, constructing the carriage road between Piedimulera and Pieve Vergonte, followed by the connecting road between Rumianca and Vogogna, including the suspended "footbridge" over the Toce River.

In 1920, the site was acquired by SNIA Company, part of the Gualino enterprise, and the corporate headquarters was transferred to Turin. The new Company introduced the production of organic chlorinated compounds.

SNIA was already an established industry producing artificial textile fibres and required carbon disulfide and caustic soda for its processes. The new Managing Director was engineer Ostilio Severini. New plants were established for the production of tetralin, chlorobenzene, and concentrated soda. Professor Luigi Casale, from the Chemistry Faculty of the University of Turin, completed studies and experimentation on ammonia synthesis, then licensed the patent to Rumianca. In the 1930s, due to economic sanctions imposed on Italy and the resulting state of autarky, Rumianca undertook mining activities in Val Toppa, Valle Anzasca, and Valle Antrona. Using arsenic trioxide obtained from arsenical pyrites from gold mines, production began of formulated fungicides and copper sulfate. Along with the Cani mine in Vanzone, the company acquired the Battiggio mining facility, where extracted ore was partially processed, with completion at Pieve using "Lurgi" rotary furnaces for ore treatment. Iron pyrites from the Ogaggia mine in Valle Antrona provided sulfur dioxide for sulfuric acid and oleum production. A "gold" department was also equipped for precious metal extraction through roasting and cyanidation processes.

In 1924, the site was acquired by the Rumianca Chemical Mining Company, which transformed in 1941 into Rumianca S.p.A., a company of the SIR Financial S.p.A. group. This introduced the production of arsenic and its derivatives from auriferous arsenopyrites from the nearby Valle Anzasca.

From 1930, the Managing Director was Comm. Ferdinando Ravazzi, who led Rumianca to public listing in 1938. To ensure an ample electricity supply, Rumianca began construction of the Megolo hydroelectric plant in 1938, producing approximately 8,000 kWh by diverting water from the Toce with the Masone dam, plus a small plant at Piedimulera producing approximately 2,500 kWh. During World War II (1940-1945), the Company signed a collaboration agreement with the Military Chemical Centre for the production of chemical weapons, smoke agents, and fog agents. A new chlor-alkali plant was installed with KREBBS technology, equipped with 68 mercury cells capable of producing 30 tons of 100% caustic soda and 27 tons of chlorine daily. The industrial area was expanded by approximately 200,000 m², and plants were built for metallic sodium, DCA, DFA, phosgene, formic acid, and new chlorobenzene.

Between 1941 and 1942, during Mussolini's fascist government period, the Workers' Village was built, equipped with twenty buildings containing 90 apartments, several villas for executives, recreational facilities with a hotel and cinema, a modern infirmary, a gymnasium, a shower building with changing rooms, and a new executive office building. All buildings and services were designed by internationally renowned architect Paolo Vietti Violi. The company canteen was completely restructured and expanded to serve 1,000 meals daily.

Subsequently, production developed along chlor-alkali, sulfuric acid, and fertiliser production lines. In the postwar period, Rumianca and later SIR developed new production lines consisting of DDT production. These products were used by the United States during the Vietnam War. During the same period, the following productions were activated: chlor-alkali line with Krebbs cells, sulfuric acid with pyrite roasting furnaces, oleum, chlorosulfonic acid, synthetic ammonia from methane cracking, carbon disulfide, chloral, oxalic acid, formic acid, K-N-P based fertilizers, mono and dichlorobenzenes, ammonium sulfate, and ammonium tetrachloride.

After the war ended, Rumianca established a modern and well-equipped Studies and Research Laboratory for developing new products for agriculture and basic chemistry; consequently, it began production of complex granular fertilisers: phosphammonium and PKN. In 1948, construction of the Ceppomorelli hydroelectric plant was completed, deriving from the Anza at Macugnaga and completed with a settling basin in Val Quarazza; the penstock has a 550 m drop and the plant develops 14,000 kW of power. Fertiliser production required the construction of a modern Synthetic Ammonia plant, Casale system, for nitrogen-hydrogen mixture production from methane, a Cracking plant was installed under Hercules license and built by Grande Paroisse of France. A large sulfuric acid plant was also installed, capable of treating granular and flotation iron pyrites, with DORR-OLIVER (USA) fluidised bed furnaces. Fertiliser production reached 25,000 tons per year, stored in bulk in two large warehouses and packaged at shipping time. Plants were built for the production of D.D.T., Sulfuric Chlorhydrin, Chlorine and Orthodichlorobenzene, decolorising earths, selective herbicides, Rumianca powder, copper oxychloride, microsulfur, and ammonium sulfate with 80 ton/day capacity. In 1954, outside the plant near the canal, to compensate for electricity shortages in the winter months, a heavy fuel oil thermal power plant was built with 14,000 kW capacity, featuring a Breda boiler, a Tosi turbine, and a Savigliano generator.

Starting in the 1960s, electrolysis plants with de Nora amalgam cells and a new mono and dichlorobenzene plant (1961) were started. In 1965, carbon disulfide production ended.

In 1964, President Gualino died. Due to the construction of the new Cagliari-Assemini plant and simultaneous competition in the fertiliser market from state companies, Rumianca was involved in a serious financial crisis, with consequent loss of stock exchange listing. The SIR group of N. Rovelli quickly acquired 37% of Rumianca shares, becoming the majority shareholder in 1967; headquarters were transferred to Milan. Until 1982, Rumianca's life was conditioned by Rovelli's administration, and when SIR was overwhelmed by debts accumulated from poor management of received loans, a significant portion was indirectly transferred to Rumianca itself, which risked permanent closure.

Under Legislative Decree 9 December 1981 No. 721, for implementation of the SIR Group reorganisation program, which included Rumianca S.p.A. with the Pieve Vergonte plant, the Company's plants were transferred to the ENI Group and from there to ANIC Company on 8 April 1982. ANIC inherited the following plants: chlor-alkali with De Nora type mercury cells, sulfuric acid, DDT and chloral plants, chlorinated benzene derivatives, carbon tetrachloride, and the methane plant. Subsequently, ANIC Company transferred the plant to ENICHIMICA SECONDARIA S.p.A (06/01/1983), ENICHIMICA changed its name to ENICHEM Sintesi S.p.A (09/20/1984) until 01/01/1996, when EniChem Synthesis S.p.A was incorporated into EniChem Holding Company. DDT production was stopped on 30 June 1996. Chloral and chlorosulfonic acid production was stopped on 30 June 1997. On 1 July 1997, the De Nora type mercury cell chlor-alkali plants, sulfuric acid, chloroaromatics (chlorinated compounds of benzene and toluene), methane thermal plant were sold to Tessenderlo Italia, for which the chlor-alkali and chloroaromatic plants (chlorinated compounds of benzene and toluene) are in production.

In May 2013, Tessenderlo sold to ICIG (International Chemical Investors Group) the companies Tessenderlo Partecipazioni S.p.A. and its subsidiary Tessenderlo Italia Srl. The operation included the Pieve Vergonte (VB) plant, where an electrolysis plant and one for chloro-aromatics are active, plus two hydroelectric plants that supply energy to the chemical complex. Tessenderlo Italia employed a total of 113 people. Achim Riemann, ICIG Managing Director, stated:

The upstream integration of Tessenderlo Italia, with direct energy supply through its own hydroelectric plants, is fundamental to the competitiveness of the Pieve Vergonte plant and therefore we want to maintain this integration and both hydroelectric concessions have been renewed for the long term.

The company markets under the name hydrochemitalia. On 29 March 2019, at the Ministry of Economic Development, the Pieve Vergonte (VB) site of Hydrochem Italia S.r.l. passed to Esseco Group ownership with a new industrial plan for the Pieve Vergonte site. In the industrial plan, Esseco Group emphasised how fundamental it is to use self-produced electricity from the Ceppo Morelli plants in Val Anzasca and Megolo. Esseco Group will provide a new chlor-alkali production plant, whose commissioning is an essential condition for returning to normal production. In autumn 2017, the European Union had stopped the mercury plant the company was using because it was too polluting.

The second major industrial plant in Pieve Vergonte (Italy) is SITINDUSTRIE, which has a leading position in Europe in the field of copper and copper alloy products for the electromechanical, galvanic and building industry. The first industrial site was established in 1909. At the end of 1992 SITINDUSTRIE entered the non ferrous metal market acquiring from ENI the factory in Pieve Vergonte. Since 2011 the plant is owned by V.C.O. Copper SpA. It occupies a site of 77.000 m² of which 27.500 m² covered, with a total capacity of 20.000 tons per year of copper and copper alloys round square and hexagonal sections and profiles, as well as special products such as large diameter seamless CuNi pipes and CuNi bars & billets for marine applications. The production capability, the wide range of products (more than a thousand sections available) and the high quality standards of the range characterize the plant production.

=== Energy production ===
Pieve Vergonte produces electricity from hydraulic sources.

=== Natural and mineral resources ===
Along the Marmazza stream, above Pieve Vergonte, the Toppa valley is of considerable mining value.

Gold extraction from Val Toppa mines was practised using mercury. As proof of interest in extracting gold ore, reference should be made to the Val Toppa Gold Mining Company, listed on the London Stock Exchange in 1863. Val Toppa Company's gold production was:

- Year 1864 - Production 509 ounces & 275 - Value 1798 pounds (£), 18 shillings (s), 9 pence (d)
- Year 1865 - Production 574 ounces & 575 - Value 2032 £, 14 s, 5 d
- Year 1866 - Production 1400 ounces & 925 - Value 4957 £, 15 s, 8 d

with an average production of 1 ounce and 5 pennyweight of gold per ton of extracted ore.

== Sources ==
- De Bartolomeis, G. Luigi (1843). Notizie topografiche e statistiche sugli stati sardi: dedicate A.S.S.R.M Carlo Alberto [Topographical Data and Statistics on Sardinian States: dedicated to His Majesty Charles Albert] (in Italian). Turin: Chirio e Mina.
- Casalis, Goffredo (1847). Dizionario geografico, storico, statistico, commerciale degli stati di S.M. il re di Sardegna [Geographical, historical, statistical, commercial dictionary of the states of H.M. the king of Sardinia] (in Italian). Vol. 16. Turin: Presso G. Maspero Librajo. p. 652.
- Diacono, Paolo (1990). Pin, Italo (ed.). Storia dei Longobardi [History of the Lombards]. Biblioteca di storia (in Italian). Pordenone: Studio Tesi. ISBN 978-887692231-2.
- Jenkinson, Charles (1785). A collection of all the treaties of peace, alliance, and commerce between Great Britain and other Powers, from the treaty signed at Munster in 1648 to the treaties signed at Paris in 1783. Vol. II – from 1713 to 1748. London, opposite Burlington House, Piccadilly: J. Debrett.
- Labus, Giovanni (1842). Antica romana via del Sempione: nuovamente osservata e illustrata; con monumenti contemporanei [The Ancient Roman Road from Simplon: newly observed and illustrated; with contemporary monuments] (in Italian). Milan: I. R. Istituto lombardo.
- Martin, Simon (2004). Football and Fascism: The National Game Under Mussolini. New York, USA: Berg Publishers. ISBN 978-185973705-7.
- Robolini, Giuseppe (1826). Notizie appartenenti alla storia della sua patria: raccolte ed illustrate da Giuseppe Robolini, gentiluomo pavese [News belonging to the history of his homeland: collected and illustrated by Giuseppe Robolini, a gentleman from Pavia] (in Italian). Vol. II. Pavia: Fusi e Comp.
- Rosina, Gaetano (1819). Osservazioni e richerche minearologiche-chimiche sopra alcune valli dell'ossola del chimico Gaetano Rosina: coll'aggiunta di un metodo economico per estrarre l'oro da una miniera di quei dintorni riputata finora incoltivabile [Observations and mineralological-chemical researches in some valleys of the Ossola by the chemist Gaetano Rosina: with an economic method for extracting gold from a mine whose surroundings have been rebuilt and is now unworkable] (in Italian). Milan: Giovanni Pirotta.
- Soldani, Massimiliano (1999). L'ultimo poeta armato: Alessandro Pavolini segretario del Partito fascista repubblicano [The last armed poet: Alessandro Pavolini, secretary of the Republican Fascist Party]. Sinergie (in Italian). Milan: Barbarossa. OCLC 43082470.
- Viganò, Marino (1991). Il Ministero degli Affari Esteri e le Relazioni Internazionali della Repubblica Sociale Italiana: 1943–1945 [The Ministry of Foreign Affairs and International Relations of the Italian Social Republic: 1943-1945] (in Italian). Milan: Jaca Book. ISBN 978-881695081-8.
- De Vit, Vincenzo (1859). Memorie Storiche di Borgomanero e del suo mandamento compilate dal Sacerdote Vincenzo De Vit [Memories of Borgomanero and his mandate: compiled by Father Vincenzo De Vit] (in Italian). Milan: Ditta Boniardi Pogliani di Ermenegildo Besozzi.
- Memorie del Reale istituto lombardo di scienze, lettere ed arti, Volume 1,- Milano – Tipografia Bernardoni – 1843
