= Law of identity =

Logic statement

In logic, the law of identity states that each thing is identical with itself, or symbolically a = a. It applies to singular terms, and is a tautology.

== History ==
=== Ancient and Medieval philosophy ===
Identity has been discussed since antiquity in philosophy, but as a principle in logic was not discussed until much later. (Note: Note how despite the "laws of thought" sometimes being attributed to Aristotle; even Hamilton, who believed in the laws of thought, noted Aristotle does not talk about identity. Identity is not a symbol in Aristotle's categorical syllogism, and singular terms are not its topic but rather general terms.)

William Hamilton offers a history of the so called "laws of thought". About the law of identity he states "it was not explicated as a coordinate principle till a comparatively recent period. The earliest author in whom I have found this done, is Antonius Andreas, a scholar of Scotus, who flourished at the end of the thirteenth and beginning of the fourteenth century. The schoolman, in the fourth book of his Commentary of Aristotle's Metaphysics – a commentary which is full of the most ingenious and original views – not only asserts to the law of Identity a coordinate dignity with the law of Contradiction, but against Aristotle, he maintains that the principle of Identity is the one absolutely first. The formula in which Andreas expressed it was Ens est ens. Subsequently to this author, the question concerning the relative priority of the two laws of Identity and of Contradiction became one much agitated in the schools; though there were also found some who asserted to the law of Excluded Middle this supreme rank." [From Hamilton LECT. V. LOGIC. 65–66]

=== Modern philosophy ===
Gottfried Wilhelm Leibniz claimed that the law of identity, which he expresses as "Everything is what it is", is the first primitive truth of reason which is affirmative, and the law of noncontradiction is the first negative truth (Nouv. Ess. IV, 2, § i), arguing that "the statement that a thing is what it is, is prior to the statement that it is not another thing" (Nouv. Ess. IV, 7, § 9). Wilhelm Wundt credits Gottfried Leibniz with the symbolic formulation, "A is A."

Another law known as Leibniz's law, rather than merely expressing identity, defines identity: if two objects have all the same properties, they are in fact one and the same: $\forall F\,(Fx \leftrightarrow Fy) \leftrightarrow x = y$.

John Locke (Essay Concerning Human Understanding IV. vii. iv. ("Of Maxims") says:

[...] whenever the mind with attention considers any proposition, so as to perceive the two ideas signified by the terms, and affirmed or denied one of the other to be the same or different; it is presently and infallibly certain of the truth of such a proposition; and this equally whether these propositions be in terms standing for more general ideas, or such as are less so: e.g., whether the general idea of Being be affirmed of itself, as in this proposition, "whatsoever is, is"; or a more particular idea be affirmed of itself, as "a man is a man"; or, "whatsoever is white is white" [...]

Afrikan Spir proclaimed the law of identity as the fundamental law of knowledge, which is opposed to the changing appearance of the empirical reality.

=== Contemporary philosophy ===
==== Analytic ====
In the Foundations of Arithmetic, Gottlob Frege associated the number one with the property of being self identical. Frege's paper "On Sense and Reference" begins with a discussion on equality and meaning. Frege wondered how a true statement of the form "a = a", a trivial instance of the law of identity, could be different from a true statement of the form "a = b", a genuine extension of knowledge, if the meaning of a term was its referent.

Bertrand Russell in "On Denoting" has this similar puzzle: "If a is identical with b, whatever is true of the one is true of the other, and either may be substituted for the other without altering the truth or falsehood of that proposition. Now George IV wished to know whether Scott was the author of Waverley; and in fact Scott was the author of Waverley. Hence we may substitute “Scott” for “the author of Waverley” and thereby prove that George IV wished to know whether Scott was Scott. Yet an interest in the law of identity can hardly be attributed to the first gentleman of Europe.”

In his "Tractatus Logico-Philosophicus", Ludwig Wittgenstein writes that "roughly speaking: to say of two things that they are identical is nonsense, and to say of one thing that it is identical with itself is to say nothing."

In the formal logic of analytical philosophy, the law of identity is written "a = a" or "For all x: x = x", where a or x refer to a singular term rather than a proposition, and thus the law of identity is not used in propositional logic.

==== Continental ====
Martin Heidegger gave a talk in 1957 entitled "Der Satz der Identität" (The Statement of Identity), where he linked the law of identity "A=A" to the Parmenides' fragment "to gar auto estin noien te kai einai" (for the same thing can be thought and can exist). Heidegger thus understands identity starting from the relationship of Thinking and Being, and from the belonging-together of Thinking and Being.

Gilles Deleuze wrote that "Difference and Repetition" is prior to any concept of identity.

== Modern logic ==
In first-order logic, identity (or equality) is represented as a two-place predicate, or relation, =. Identity is a relation on individuals. It is not a relation between propositions, and is not concerned with the meaning of propositions, nor with equivocation. The law of identity can be expressed as $\forall x (x = x)$, where x is a variable ranging over the domain of all individuals. In logic, there are various different ways identity can be handled. In first-order logic with identity, identity is treated as a logical constant and its axioms are part of the logic itself. Under this convention, the law of identity is a logical truth.

In first-order logic without identity, identity is treated as an interpretable predicate and its axioms are supplied by the theory. This allows a broader equivalence relation to be used that may allow a = b to be satisfied by distinct individuals a and b. Under this convention, a model is said to be normal when no distinct individuals a and b satisfy a = b.

One example of a logic that restricts the law of identity in this way is Schrödinger logic.
