= Lago di Comabbio =

Lake in Lombardy, Italy

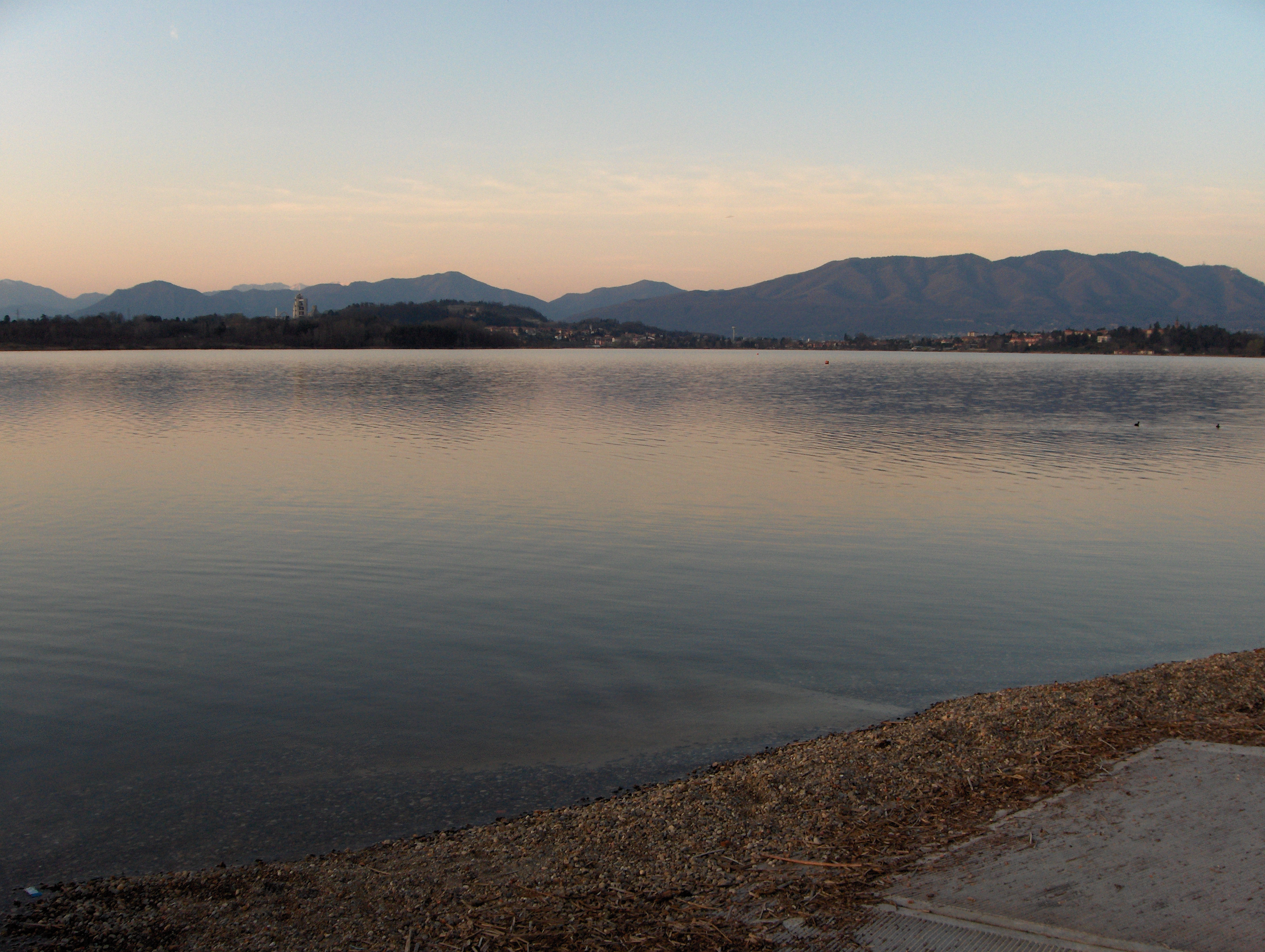

- Location within Lombardy
- Location: Province of Varese, Lombardy
- Coordinates: 45°46′7″N 8°41′34″E
- Primary inflows: Different streams
- Primary outflows: Canale Brabbia
- Basin countries: Italy
- Max. length: 3.6 km (2.2 mi)
- Max. width: 1.4 km (0.87 mi)
- Surface area: 3.4 km^{2} (1.3 sq mi)
- Max. depth: 8 m (26 ft)
- Surface elevation: 243 m (797 ft)

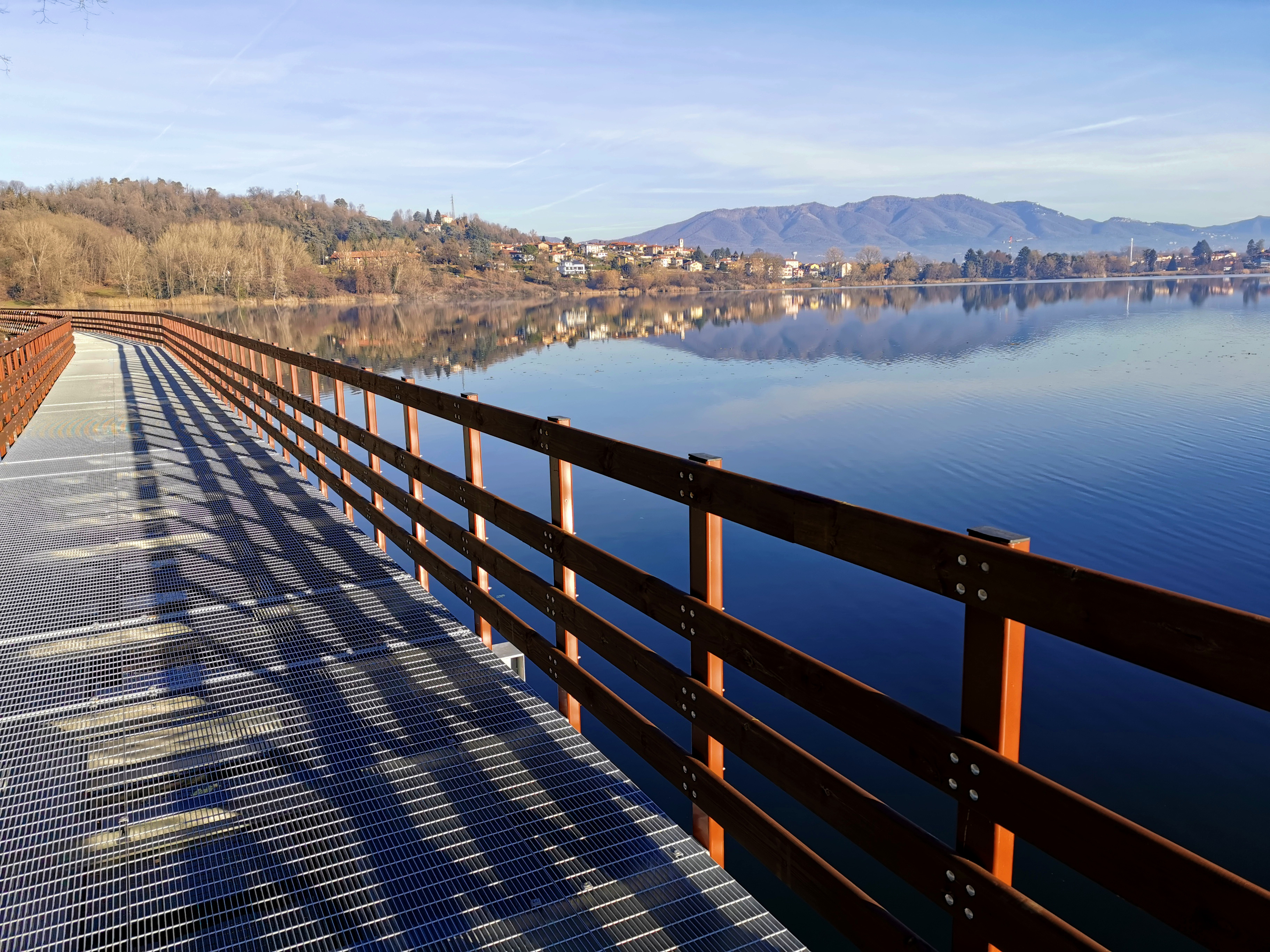
Catwalk over Lago di Comabbio, near Ternate

== Geography ==
Lago di Comabbio is a lake in the Province of Varese, Lombardy, Italy. At an elevation of 243 m (797 ft), its surface area is 3.4 km^{2} (1.3 sq mi).

Once it was part of Lake Varese, but now the two lakes are connected just by an artificial channel.

== Wildlife ==
On the lake, it is forbidden to use motor boats, and thanks to this, the growth of the wildlife is possible.

The lake hosts different species of fishes such as: pikes, bluegills, craps and Tenches. Experts think that in the next few years the fauna of this lake will be in serious danger, because of the most likely arrival of one of the most lethal predators in northern Italy: the Wels catfish. Who is yet causing serious problems in other lakes and rivers in northern Italy, such as Lake Maggiore, Lake Iseo and also in Po River.
