= Mykhailo Shpir =

Ukrainian journalist (born 1986)

- Михайло Шпір
- Born: 16 August 1986 (age 40); Chernivtsi, Ukrainian SSR, Soviet Union (now Ukraine)
- Education: Vasyl Stefanyk Precarpathian National University
- Occupations: campaign manager, blogger

Mykhailo Fedorovych Shpir (Ukrainian: Михайло Федорович Шпір; born 16 August 1986) is a Ukrainian journalist, blogger, political scientist. Since 22 September 2022 he has been Deputy Minister of Digital Development and Mass Communications of the Kherson Oblast by its Russian occupations.

== Biography ==
In 2008 he graduated from the law faculty of the Vasyl Stefanyk Precarpathian National University. In 2014 he graduated from the aspirantur at Kyiv National Economic University. Since 2009, he worked as editor of the Russian edition of "Snob" and the ukrainian magazine "Zolotaya kasta". On 17 May 2010 he founded the "Sistema" management company, which provided branding, promotion, design and advertising services. In the 2019 Ukrainian parliamentary election, he ran for People's Deputies on the list of the "Opposition Platform — For Life". Since spring 2021 he has been working in Moscow. Since 1 July 2022, he has been the deputy director of the Department of Digital Development and Mass Communications of the Russian occupation Military-Civilian Administration of the Kherson Oblast, since 22 September, he has been the Deputy Minister of Digital Development and Mass Communications.

== Prosecution ==
In 2017 he was added to the site Myrotvorets for incitement to ethnic hatred.

He claimed that he received threats from right-wing radicals, and that a group of Ukrainian nationalists attacked him in a Kyiv restaurant, doused him with coffee and smashed his glasses. On 25 August 2020, he provoked a fight in Lviv.

In 6 September 2020 he fled Ukraine to seek political asylum. The Security Service of Ukraine put him on the wanted list on charges of violating several articles of the Criminal Code of Ukraine. On 18 March 2021, security officers searched his places of residence in Ukraine. At the end of May 2021, he was repeatedly summoned for interrogation to the Office of the Attorney General.

On 18 March 2021, security officers searched his apartment in Kyiv, his parents' house in Ivano-Frankivsk and the place of residence of his girlfriend. They seized equipment, money and everything that looked like communist symbols. On 7 June 2023 he was sentenced in absentia by the regional court of Ivano-Frankivsk to 10 years in prison with confiscation of property.
