= Joseph Gabriel Findel =

Writer and publisher (1828–1905)

Gottfried Joseph Gabriel Findel (born 21 October 1828 in Kupferberg, died 23 November 1905 in Leipzig) was a Masonic writer and publisher.

== Life ==
Findel came from a poor family. He went to high school in Bamberg in 1848 and attended the Ludwig-Maximilians-Universität München, but was taken into custody in the following year for his part in the political movement in 1849. Pardoned after ten months in prison, he abandoned his studies and devoted himself to the book trade in Heidelberg, where he also attended lectures at the university. In 1856, he was admitted to Freemasonry in the Lodge Eleusis in Bayreuth.

Later he moved to Leipzig, where he joined the Lodge Minerva. After working as co-editor of the Illustrierten Zeitung (Illustrated News) in 1858 he went into business with Rudolf Seidel, and with the Masonic newspaper Die Bauhütte (The Lodge) founded a publishing business.

In 1860 the Prince Hall Grand Lodge of Massachusetts in the United States appointed him honorary Grand Master to Prince Hall Freemasonry in Germany.

Disputes arose from his writing activities, which led in 1891 to his retirement from the lodge in Leipzig, but in 1898 he became a member of the lodge John of the Rebuilt Temple in Ludwigsburg. Rehabilitation with Leipzig did not occur until after the Lodge Phoenix, which emerged from Minerva, accepted him as a member, allowing the reconciliation process with the Leipzig Freemasons to begin.

He was also the editor of African Spir's philosophical works.

== Selected works ==
- Geschichte der Freimaurerei von der Zeit ihres Entstehens bis auf die Gegenwart. Leipzig, Luppe 1861-62 (his main work, translated several times, numerous editions. Published in English in 1865 as A History of Freemasonry from its Rise to the Present Day.)
- History of freemasonry from its rise down to the present day. Translated from the second German edition under the author's personal supervision London : Asher 1866, accessed 4 October 2014
- Br Schiffmann und die Grosse Landesloge von Deutschland. Leipzig: J. G. Findel 1877
- Meine maurerische Büchersammlung (1870)
- Grundsätze der Freimaurerei im Völkerleben (2. Aufl. 1882);
- Geist und Form der Freimaurerei: Instructionen für Brr. Maurer (4. Aufl. 1883)
- Quickborn der Lebensweisheit (2. Aufl. 1860)
- Bausteine zur Diätetik der Seele (2. Aufl. 1864)
- Die klassische Periode der deutschen Nationalliteratur im 18. Jahrhundert (2. Aufl. 1873)
- Der innere Zerfall der Socialdemokratie. Leipzig, 1880
- Die Juden als Freimaurer. Leipzig, 1893
- Schach-Bismarck oder Jesuiten und Freimaurer (Roman) Leipzig: Findel 1894. Edition Corvey: Mikrofiche-Ausgabe o. J.. ISBN 3-628-39583-6
- Geschichte der Grossloge zur Sonne in Bayreuth Leipzig, J.G.Findel 1897

His writings on Freemasonry are collected as J. G. Findel’s Schriften über Freimaurerei, 1882–85, 6 Bde. Reprint Vaduz/Liechtenstein: Sändig-Reprints-Verlag, o. J.
