= Lake Varese =

Varese Lake Lago di Varese
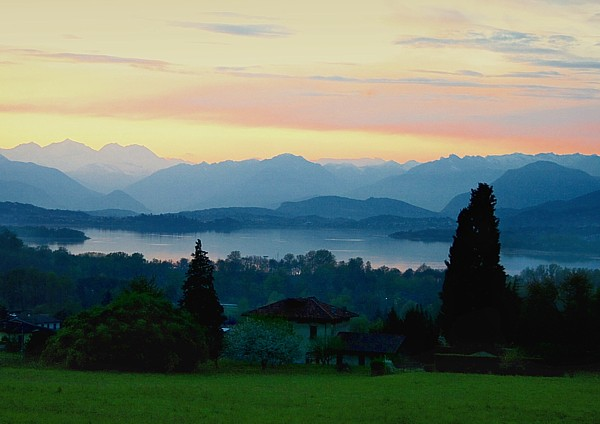

- Location within Lombardy
- Location: Province of Varese, Lombardy
- Coordinates: 45°49′N 8°44′E
- Type: Natural freshwater lake
- Primary outflows: Bardello
- Catchment area: 112 km^{2} (43 sq mi)
- Basin countries: Italy
- Max. length: 8.6 km (5.3 mi)
- Max. width: 3.1 km (1.9 mi)
- Surface area: 14.5 km^{2} (5.6 sq mi)
- Average depth: 11 m (36 ft)
- Max. depth: 23 m (75 ft)
- Residence time: 1.8 years
- Surface elevation: 238 m (781 ft)
- Settlements: Varese, Biandronno (village), Gavirate (village)

Varese Lake (Italian: Lago di Varese) is a lake of glacial origin in Lombardy, in the north of Italy. It has an area of 14.5 km², a medium depth of 11 m, and a maximum depth of 23 m.

It hosted the Canoeing European Championships in 2012, the World Rowing Master Regatta in 2013, the World Rowing Under 23 Championships in 2014, the second Canoeing World Championship in 2015 and the World Rowing Under 23 / Under 19 Championships in 2022.

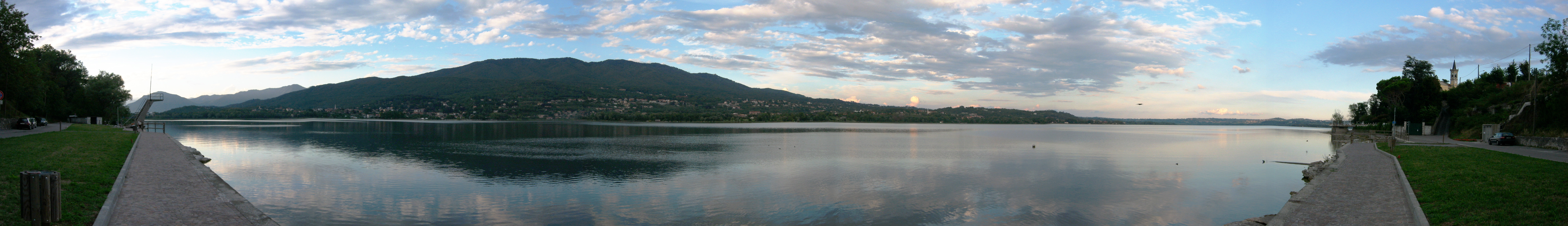
Panoramic view of the lake from Biandronno.

== Formation ==
The birth of Lake Varese dates back to about 15,000 years ago, at the same time as that of nearby Lake Maggiore, when the retreat of the Verbano glacier created the large basin in which the city and its lake are located today, which at the time had a much larger surface and included much of the surrounding lakes.

== The Waters ==
The lake is currently (since 2015) not suitable for swimming.

== Flora and Fauna ==
Flora

Lying between the basins of Lake Varese and Lake Comabbio, the Palude Brabbia, covering 459 hectares, is a nature reserve that protects one of the best-preserved examples of lowland peat bog. The swamp is an alternation of areas covered by dense aquatic vegetation, with large reeds, willows and alders, sometimes open water, the so-called clear, small bodies of water with a regular shape. Since 1994, the management of the reserve has been entrusted to Lipu.

Fauna

There are about 170 species of birds that frequent the area of Lake Varese. Among the most difficult to meet there are some species of ducks such as the Tufted Duck and Gadwall or herons such as the Bittern and the Purple Heron.

== See also ==
- Italian Lakes
- List of lakes of Italy
