= Kupferberg =

- Town
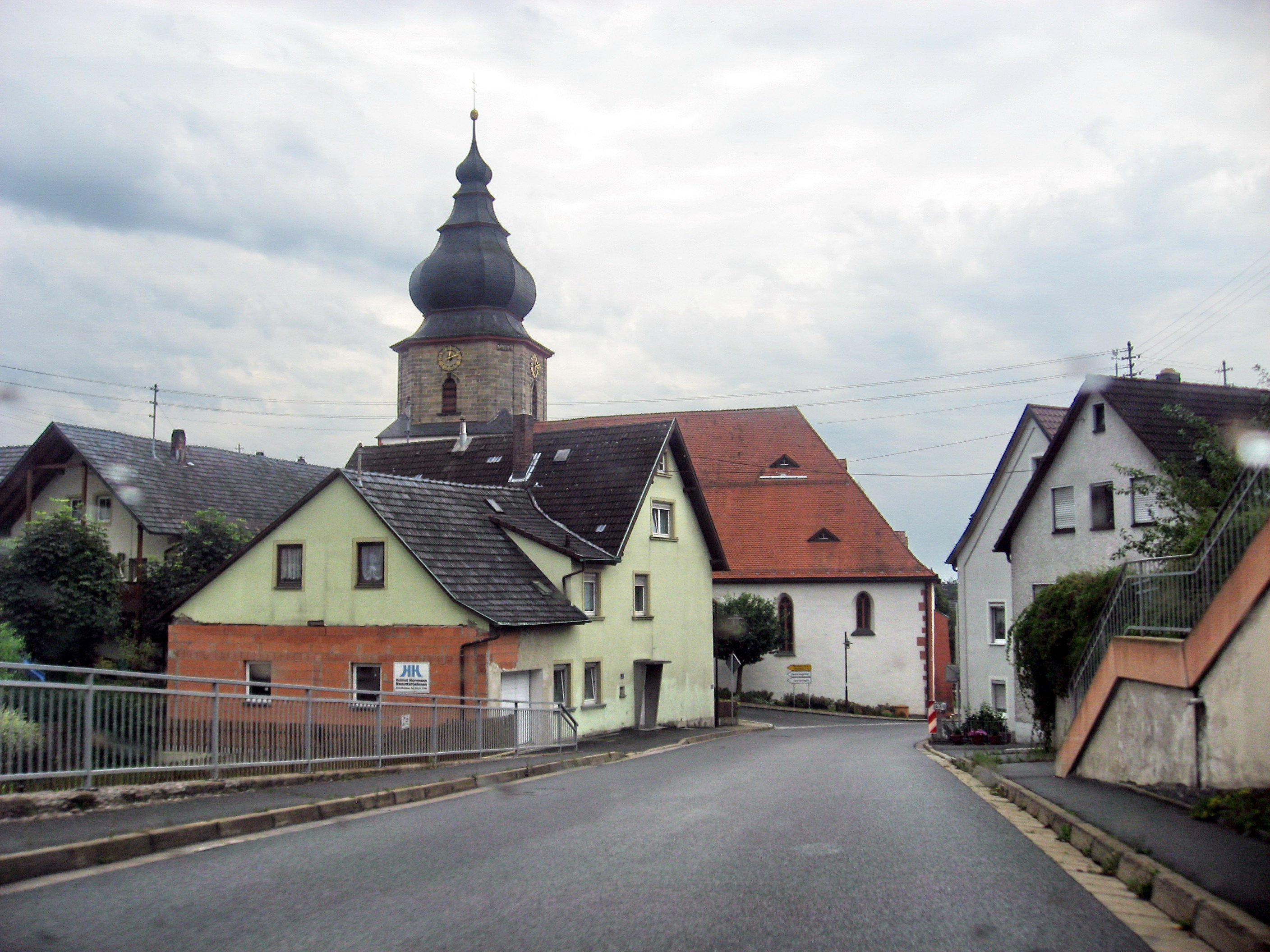
- Kupferberg

- Coat of arms

- Location of Kupferberg within Kulmbach district
- Interactive map of Kupferberg
- Location within Germany Location within Bavaria
- Coordinates: 50°7′N 11°34′E
- Country: Germany
- State: Bavaria
- Admin. region: Oberfranken
- District: Kulmbach
- Municipal assoc.: Untersteinach
- Subdivisions: 4 Ortsteile

Government
  - Mayor (2020–26): Harald Michel

Area
  - Total: 8.29 km^{2} (3.20 sq mi)
- Elevation: 467 m (1,532 ft)

Population (2025-12-31)
  - Total: 1,033
  - Density: 125/km^{2} (323/sq mi)
- Time zone: UTC+01:00 (CET)
  - Summer (DST): UTC+02:00 (CEST)
- Postal codes: 95362
- Dialling codes: 09227
- Vehicle registration: KU
- Website: www.stadt-kupferberg.de

Kupferberg (German pronunciation: [ˈkʊpfɐbɛʁk]) is a municipality in the district of Kulmbach, in Bavaria, Germany. It is situated in the Franconian Forest, 9 km northeast of Kulmbach.

== Notable people ==
- Joseph Gabriel Findel (1828–1905), freemason writer
