= Piero Martinetti =

Italian philosopher (1872–1943)

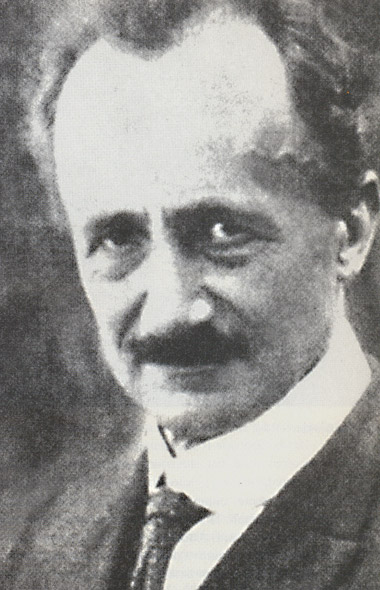
Piero Martinetti

Piero Martinetti (21 August 1872 – 23 March 1943) was an Italian philosopher who was professor of theoretical philosophy and moral philosophy. He was one of the few university professors, following the example of Benedetto Croce, to refuse to swear an oath of allegiance to the National Fascist Party.

== Early life and education ==
Born Pier Federico Giuseppe Celestino Mario Martinetti in Pont Canavese, Martinetti was the first of four children. His parents were Rosalia Bertogliatti (1846–1927) and Francesco Martinetti (1846–1921). After completing his secondary school education at the liceo classico named after Carlo Giuseppe Guglielmo Botta in Ivrea, he went on to study philosophy at the University of Turin, graduating at the age of 21 in 1893 with a dissertation on the Samkhya system in Indian philosophy. Despite some initial resistance from the University of Turin's Philosophy Department, the dissertation was published by Lattes Editori in 1896 and won the Gautieri Prize. Martinetti's interest in Indian philosophy was long lasting, including a cycle of lectures held in Milan in 1920, collected and published in 1981. After graduation, Martinetti spend two semesters (1894–1895) at Leipzig University, where he encountered the thought of Afrikan Spir.

== Career ==
After returning to Italy, Martinetti worked as a secondary school teacher in Avellino (1899–1900), Correggio (1900–1901), Vigevano (1901–1902), Ivrea (1903–1904), and at the liceo classico statale named after Vittorio Alfieri in Turin (1904–1905). In 1904, he published his introduction to metaphysics, "Introduction to Metaphysics: Theory of Knowledge" (in Italian: Introduzione alla metafisica. Teoria della conoscenza), thanks to which he was appointed professor of theoretical and moral philosophy at the Scientific-Literary Academy of Milan (in Italian: Accademia scientifico-letteraria di Milano), which was to become in 1923 the University of Milan, where he taught from 1906 to 1931. In 1915, he became an honorary fellow of the Lombard Institute Academy of Sciences and Letters (in Italian: Istituto Lombardo Accademia di Scienze e Lettere), which was founded in 1797 by Napoleon and modelled on the Institute of France (in French: Institut de France).

=== Political views ===
Martinetti was a maverick intellectual figure, independent of traditional political affiliations, as well as of the Catholic tradition. He refused to adhere both to Giovanni Gentile's "Manifesto of the Fascist Intellectuals" and to Benedetto Croce's "Manifesto of the Anti-Fascist Intellectuals". He was one of the few intellectuals to critique the First World War; he thought that war subverted social order and moral values, creating idleness and dissolution, and giving the military decision making powers, which it should not have, based either on moral or intellectual value. In 1923, following some very difficult occurrences, such as the March on Rome and Benito Mussolini's rise to power, he refused an honorary fellowship at the prestigious Academy of the Lynx-Eyed (in Italian: Accademia dei Lincei).

=== Society for Philosophical and Religious Studies ===
While in his lectures Martinetti was developing his own philosophy of religion, on 5 January 1920, in Milan, he co-founded the Society for Philosophical and Religious Studies (Italian: Società di studi filosofici e religiosi), together with some friends, fully independent of any dogmatism. The aim was to gather a number of Italian intellectuals and hold a series of conferences. In 1926, Martinetti was sued for "contempt for the Eucharist"; as a consequence, he was forced to sign a defence of his courses on philosophy of religion.

=== VI National Philosophy Congress ===
In March 1926, Martinetti organised the VI National Philosophy Congress on behalf of the Italian Philosophical Society, aiming for a free expression of ideas despite a difficult political context. The event was suspended after only two days because of protests from Italian fascist and Catholic activists. After that, the congress was cancelled, partly due to the opposition of Agostino Gemelli, at the time vice-chancellor of the Catholic University of Milan.

=== Rivista di filosofia ===
From 1927, Martinetti edited the philosophical journal Rivista di filosofia; however, his name never appeared on the publication due to the controversies surrounding him. He wanted to continue to participate and foster philosophical thought in Italy in the ways that were still accessible to him, despite his refusal to swear an oath of allegiance to the National Fascist Party. The refusal prevented him from teaching but not from collaborating in publications, such as Rivista di filosofia, which he considered partly as his brainchild.

=== Refusal to support the National Fascist Party ===
Martinetti unhesitatingly refused to swear allegiance to the National Fascist Party in December 1931; he was one of the very few university professors to do so. He explained his reasons in a letter to the Minister of Education Balbino Giuliano. In the letter, he explained that he cannot betray his own conscience, the only true light and comfort a person can have, and declared readiness to bear the consequences of that action. Following his rejection of fascism, Martinetti was forced to retire. From 1932 until his death, he devoted himself to his philosophical studies in the company of a number of cats in his house in Spineto, close to his birthplace. On his door, the inscription read "Piero Martinetti – agricoltore" ("Piero Martinetti – farmer"). During this time, he studied the works of Baruch Spinoza and Immanuel Kant, and wrote Gesù Cristo e il Cristianesimo (Jesus Christ and Christianity) in 1934, Il Vangelo (The Gospel) in 1936, and Ragione e fede (Reason and Faith) in 1942.

=== Arrest ===
Marinetti's quiet studies were interrupted by a sudden arrest and imprisonment in Turin in May 1935, being accused by Pitigrilli, an agent of the Organisation for the Vigilance and Repression of Anti-Fascism, of conniving with the anti-fascist group Justice and Freedom (in Italian: Giustizia e Libertà). The accusation was unfounded. Pitigrilli also caused the arrest with the same allegations of several Italian intellectuals, including Giulio Einaudi, Vittorio Foa, Cesare Pavese, and Carlo Levi. At the moment of his arrest, Martinetti was reported to have said, as many times before: "I am a European citizen, born in Italy by chance."

=== Final years ===
Martinetti started to decline in 1941 after an episode of thrombosis following an accidental fall off a pear tree, which also eroded his mental faculties. In 1942 and 1943, he had two prostate operations. He died in hospital in Turin, at the time evacuated in Cuorgnè, on 23 March 1943, after requesting that no priest would intervene on his body. Although the vicar of Spineto had urged not to honour the body of a man who had always been a heretic and atheist in his lifetime, about ten people followed the funeral van to the train station, from where Martinetti's corpse was taken to Turin to be cremated.

=== Legacy ===
Shortly before his death, Martinetti bequeathed his private book collection to Nina Ruffini, Gioele Solari, and Cesare Giretti. The collection was then donated to the Piero Martinetti Foundation for the Study of the History of Philosophy and Religion (in Italian: Fondazione Piero Martinetti per gli studi di storia filosofica e religiosa) in 1955. It is now part of the Library of the Faculty of Letters and Philosophy at the University of Turin. His house in Spineto hosts the headquarters of the Piero Martinetti House and Archive Foundation (in Italian: Fondazione Casa e Archivio Piero Martinetti), which aims to promote Martinetti's thought both in Italy and internationally.

== Philosophy ==
Martinetti's philosophy includes an original interpretation of neo-Kantian idealism, interpreted as transcendent pantheistic dualism. This interpretation is close to that of Spir, who was Martinetti's favourite philosopher. Martinetti wrote a long monograph on Spir, which was published after his death in 1990. Martinetti thought that Spir's metaphysics was a pure form of religious vision, fundamentally expressed in the dualism between real being (the absolute transcendent Unity through which divinity is expressed) and the multiple apparent being revealed by experience. At the same time, this dualism is apparent as it is not a distinction between two actual realities but between the only reality and the unreality in which the world sinks. Martinetti also inherited Spir's moral philosophy with very few modifications, which in turn was derived from Kant. For Martinetti, after Kant, "no serious philosopher can avoid being Kantian in ethics".

== Animals ==
In La psiche degli animali (The Psyche of Animals), Martinetti argued that, just like humans, animals possess intellect and consciousness. For Martinetti, ethics cannot be limited to regulating relationships among humans but needs to aim to ensure the wellbeing and happiness of all sentient forms of life, which like human beings are capable of experiencing pleasure, happiness, and pain. In this essay, Martinetti also observed how the great Western religions ignored the problem of the unspeakable suffering inflicted by human beings on other animals. Martinetti argued that in the eyes of other animals it is possible to see the deep unity that ties them to humans. Martinetti himself felt deep sympathy and compassion for animals, which was reflected in his vegetarianism. In his will, Martinetti left a significant sum of money to the Society for the Protection of Animals (in Italian: Società Protettrice degli Animali).
