= Bundesstraße 289 =

Federal highway in Germany

B 289
- Bundesstraße 289

Route information
- Length: 97 km (60 mi)

Location
- Country: Germany
- States: Bavaria

Highway system
- Roads in Germany; Autobahns; List; Federal; List; State; E-roads

The German federal highway, the Bundesstraße 289 (B 289), runs from Coburg to Rehau in southern Germany.

Bundesstraße 289 branches eastwards from the B 4 south of Coburg near Untersiemau. In its upgraded section from the Coburg's southern motorway junction to the Untersiemau junction on the A 73 (Suhl - Coburg - Nürnberg), the road has two lanes and, on hilly sections, three. The total cost of this six kilometre long section which was called Project Bundesstraße 289n was 26.8 million euros, of which 3.3 million euros was needed to purchase land. The new section was opened to traffic on 5 September 2008. The continuation of the road northwards begins at the Lichtenfels junction. Here it runs to just behind Hochstadt, where it branches east to Kulmbach, together with the B 173.

Until the A 73 motorway was completed the B 289 ran through Untersiemau, Obersiemau, Buch am Forst and Lichtenfels to the Lichtenfels-Ost junction on the B 173.

- Kulmbach
  - Crossing with the B 85
- Untersteinach
  - Crossing with the B 303
- Marktleugast
- Münchberg
  - Crossing with the B 2
  - shortly before the entrance to the village A 9
- Weißdorf

to

- Rehau, where it ends at the eponymous junction with the A 93.

== Junction lists ==
Legend:

- I/C - Interchange, I/S - Intersection, RSA - Rest and service area, OBR - Overhead bridge restaurant, R/R - Restaurant and rest plaza, L/B - Layby, V/P - Vista point, TN - tunnel, T/P - Toll plaza, BR - Bridge
- C - Cloverleaf, S - Stack, T-A - Trumpet-A, T-B - Trumpet-B, DT - Directional-T/Y, SDT - Semi-Directional-T/Y, P-Y - Partial-Y, D - Diamond, P-C - Partial cloverleaf, D-D - Diverging diamond, D-R - Direct ramp

Intersection	()	Coburg-Süd 3-way interchange B 4
	(11)	Untersiemau A 73
Replaced by the A 73
Motor road		Kraftfahrstraße
Intersection	(13)	Lichtenfels 3-way interchange A 73
		Lichtenfels B 173
		near Zettlitz B 173
Diversion		Burgkunstadt local diversion
Diversion		Mainleus local diversion
Diversion		Kulmbach local diversion B 85
		Untersteinach B 303
		near Ludwigschorgast B 303
		Marktleugast
	(35)	Münchberg-Nord A 9
		Münchberg B 2
Diversion		Schwarzenbach local diversion
Diversion		Rehau local diversion
	(6)	Rehau-Süd A 93

== See also ==
- List of federal highways in Germany
