= Bundesstraße 303 =

Federal highway in Germany

B 303
- Bundesstraße 303
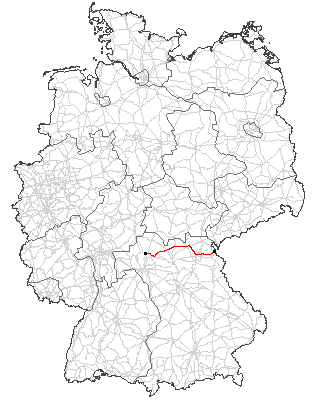

Route information
- Length: 210 km (130 mi)

Major junctions
- West end: A 7 west of Schweinfurt
- East end: Border with the Czech Republic east of Schirnding

Location
- Country: Germany
- States: Bavaria

Highway system
- Roads in Germany; Autobahns; List; Federal; List; State; E-roads

The Bundesstraße 303 (abbreviation: B 303) is a German federal highway that runs from west to east, beginning at the A 7 autobahn west of Schweinfurt and ending at the border with the Czech Republic east of Schirnding. It runs through the eastern part of Lower Franconia and the whole of Upper Franconia.

== History ==
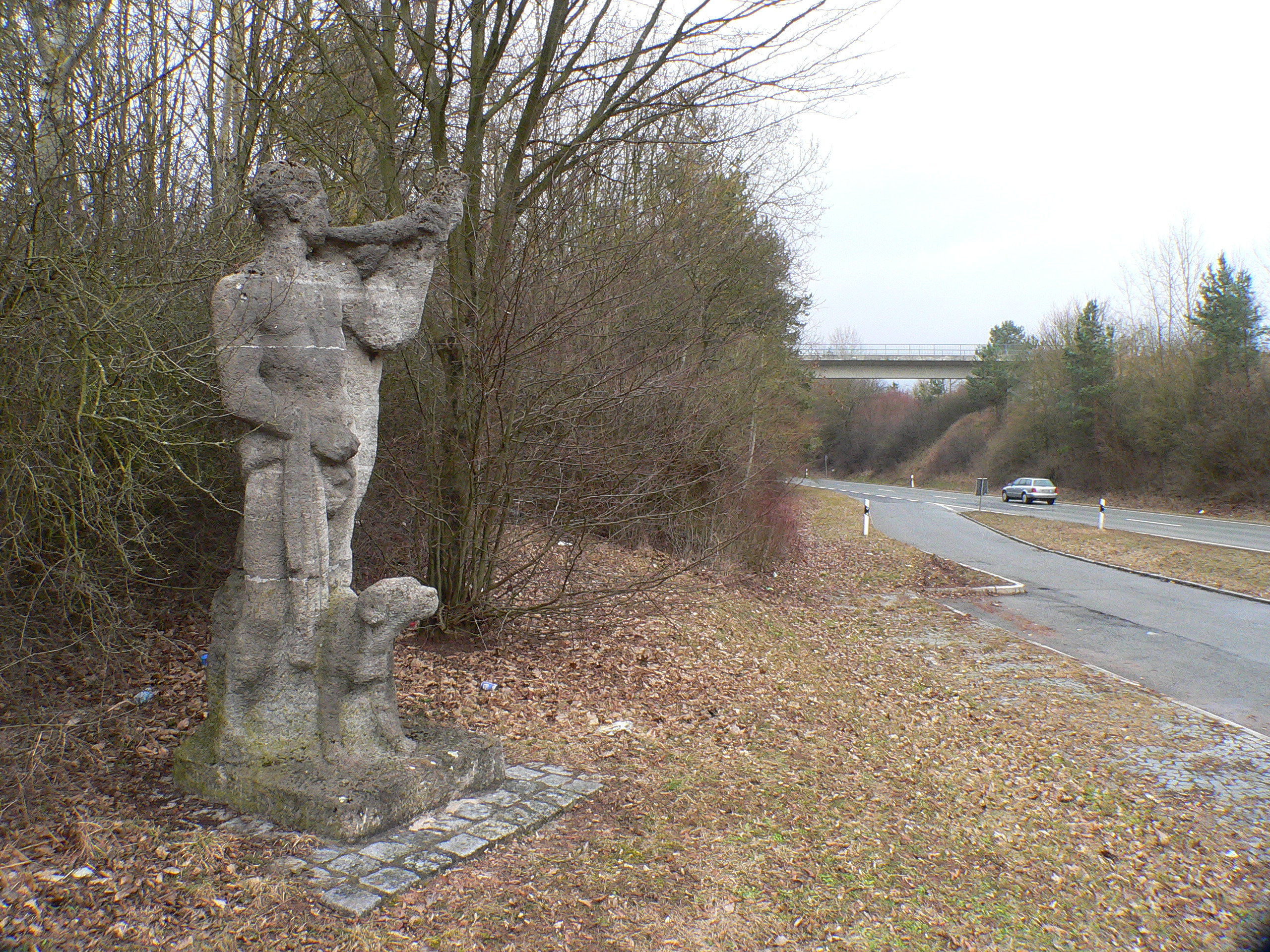
B 303 car park at Dietersdorf

The original route of Reichsstraße 303 ran from Schweinfurt via Schonungen, Hofheim in Unterfranken, Coburg, Mitwitz, Kronach and Selbitz to Hof and continued via Rehau and Eger to Mitterteich. In 1941 the section from Hof via Eger to Mitterteich was replaced by Reichsstraße 15 and the section of that from Hundsbach (border) to Mitterteich by the B 299. In the early 1950s the road from Marktrodach via Stadtsteinach, Bad Berneck, Marktredwitz and Arzberg to Schirnding was redefined as the Bundesstraße 303. This section used to be called the Main Valley Road (Maintalstraße).

The central section of the B 303 between Schonungen am Main and Tambach near Coburg originally ran through 14 villages. From the 1960s to the 1990s the route was re-routed eastwards in stages over a length of 49.7 km and, as a result, it now only passes through Oberelldorf and Tambach. Since 19 October 2007, the B 303 has crossed over junction 10 of the new A 73 autobahn (Nürnberg – Suhl) near Ebersdorf bei Coburg.

== Fichtelgebirge autobahn ==
There were plans to upgrade the section from Wirsberg to Cheb (Eger) into a four-lane 'yellow autobahn', the so-called 'Fichtelgebirge autobahn' (Fichtelgebirgsautobahn). This was intended to connected to the Czech highway, the D6 motorway, to Prague. However these plans were not put into action due to the expected environmental damage, high construction costs and decreasing traffic volumes since January 2009. Instead the existing B 303 will be selectively widened in places.

== Junction lists ==
Legend:

- I/C - Interchange, I/S - Intersection, RSA - Rest and service area, OBR - Overhead bridge restaurant, R/R - Restaurant and rest plaza, L/B - Layby, V/P - Vista point, TN - tunnel, T/P - Toll plaza, BR - Bridge
- C - Cloverleaf, S - Stack, T-A - Trumpet-A, T-B - Trumpet-B, DT - Directional-T/Y, SDT - Semi-Directional-T/Y, P-Y - Partial-Y, D - Diamond, P-C - Partial cloverleaf, D-D - Diverging diamond, D-R - Direct ramp

(98)	Wasserlosen A 7
	Sömmersdorf
(30)	Schweinfurt-West A 71
	Niederwerrn local diversion
	Schweinfurt B 26 B 286
(9)	Schonungen A 70 / E48
	near Gädheim B 26
	Hofheim local diversion
	near Breitenbach B 279
	Dietersdorf local diversion
	Ahorn local diversion
	Grub local diversion B 4
(10)	Ebersdorf bei Coburg A 73
	Sonnefeld local diversion
	Mitwitz
	Kronach local diversion B 85 B 173
	Marktrodach B 173
	Stadtsteinach
	Untersteinach local diversion B 289
	near Ludwigschorgast B 289
	Wirsberg local diversion
	Himmelkron local diversion
(39)	Bad Berneck/Himmelkron A 9
	Bad Berneck B 2
	Bischofsgrün local diversion
	Tröstau
	Bad Alexandersbad local diversion
	Marktredwitz local diversion
(13)	Marktredwitz-Nord A 93
	Arzberg local diversion
	Schirnding local diversion
(CZ)	border crossing D6 / E48
	continues in the direction of Cheb/Eger

== See also ==
- List of federal roads in Germany
