= Bundesstraße 26 =

Federal highway in Germany

B 26
- Bundesstraße 26

Route information
- Length: 233 km (145 mi)

Major junctions
- East end: Westring in Aschaffenburg, Bavaria
- Bundesautobahn 67 in Griesheim, Hesse Bundestrasse 469 in Großostheim, Bavaria
- West end: Bundestrasse 44 in Riedstadt, Hesse

Location
- Country: Germany
- States: Hesse, Bayern

Highway system
- Roads in Germany; Autobahns; List; Federal; List; State; E-roads

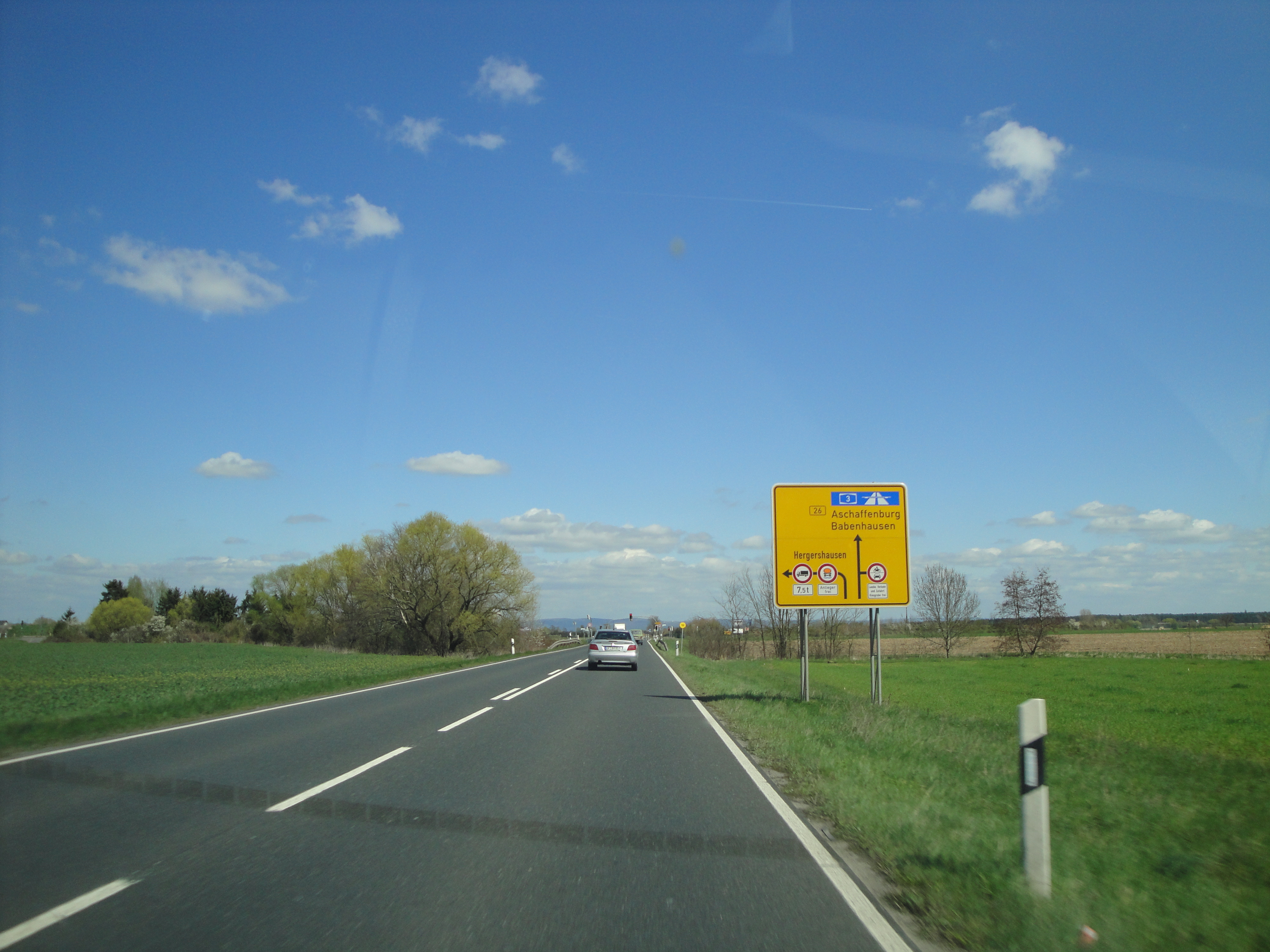
B26 at Dieburg-Aschaffenburg

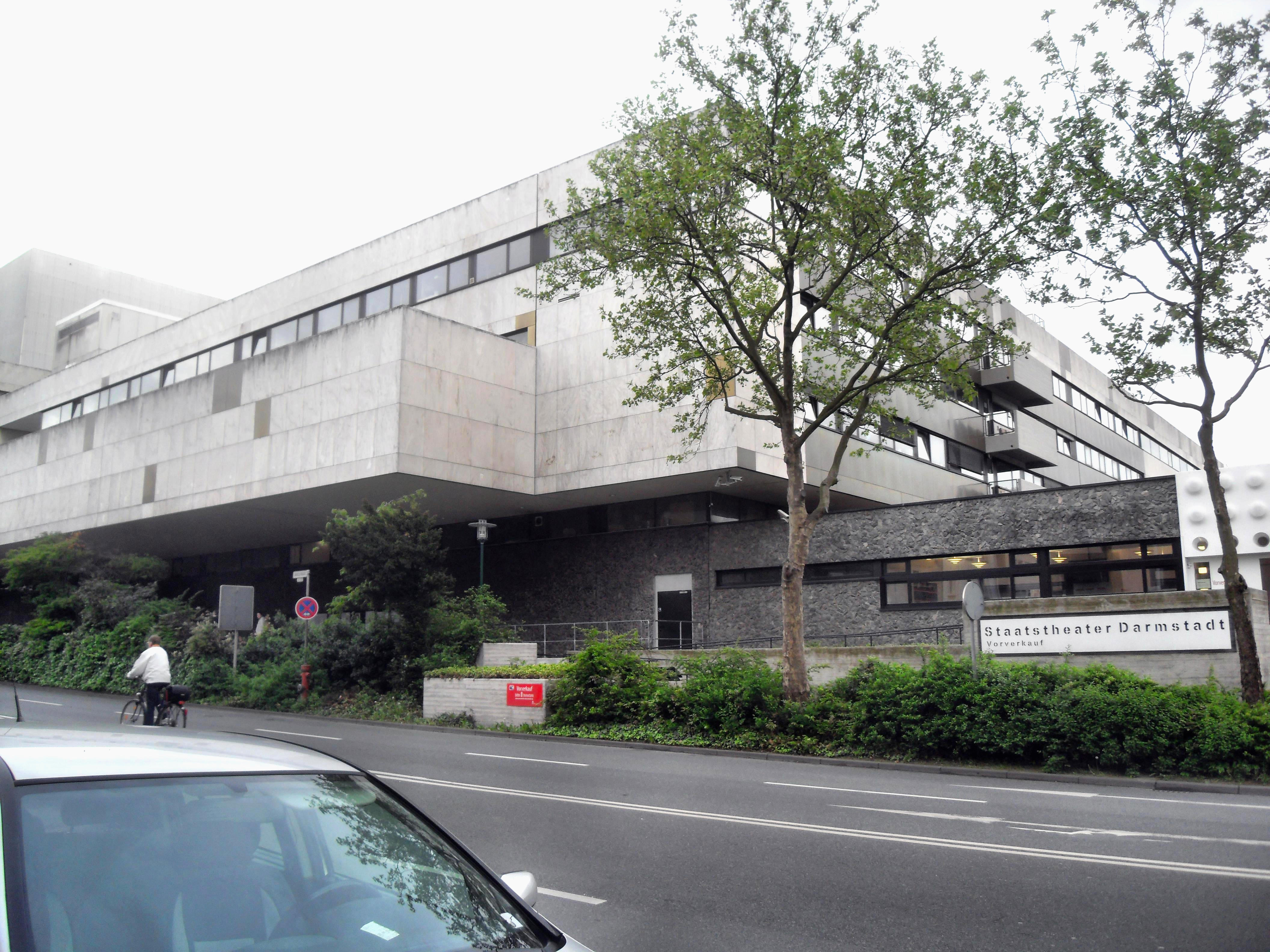
The Staatstheater Darmstadt on Bundesstraße 26

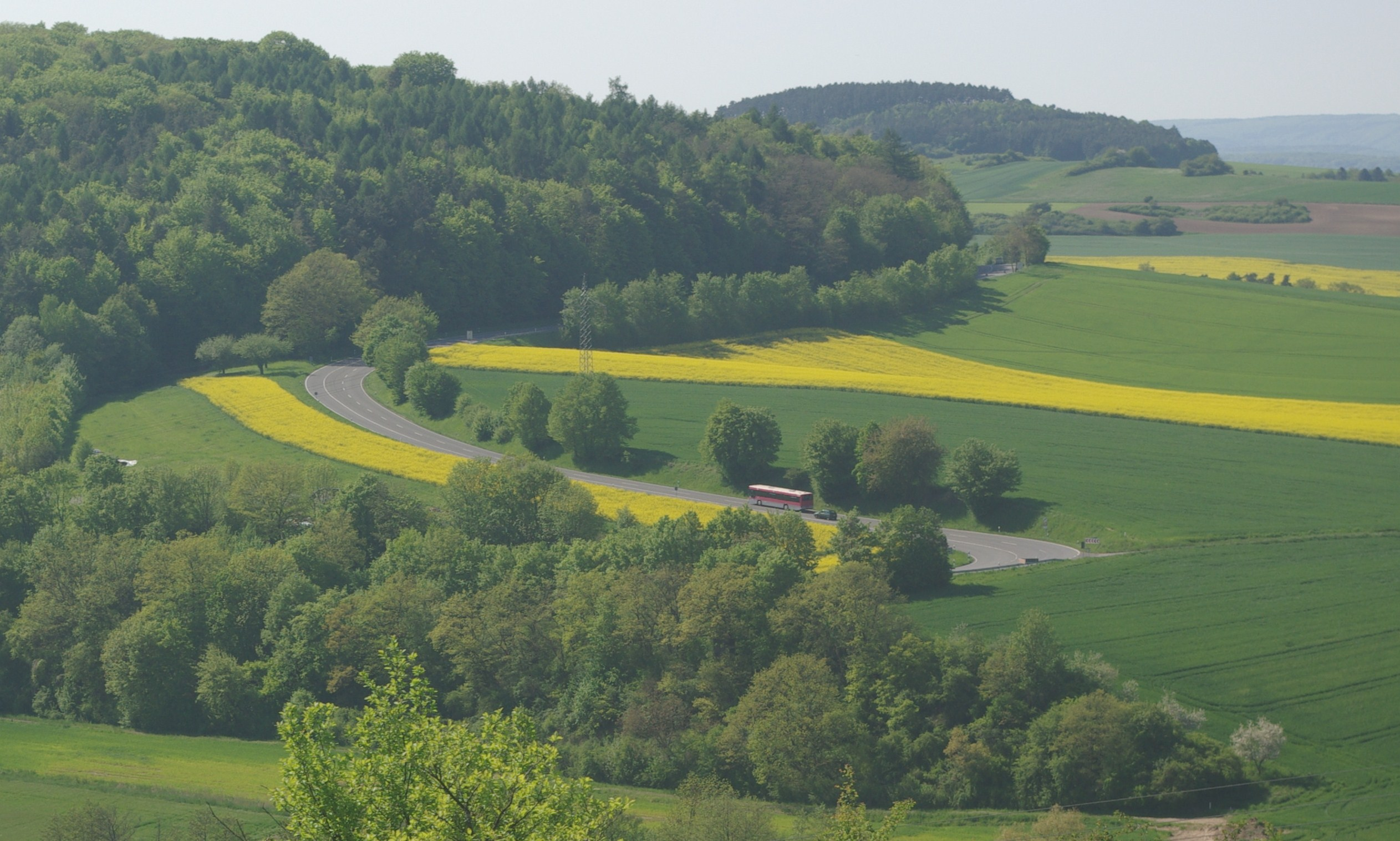
Hairpin curve between Karlstadt and Stetten in Werntal

The Bundesstraße 26 or Federal Highway 26, (abbreviation: B 26) runs between the city of Riedstadt at the B44, to the city of Hallstadt, at the Bundesautobahn 70, A70 in Germany. The highway run East to West. It crosses the River Main and the Mannheim–Frankfurt railway.

The highway runs through (West to East): Riedstadt, Griesheim, Darmstadt, Dieburg, Münster, Hesse, Babenhausen, Großostheim, Aschaffenburg, Goldbach, Bavaria, Hösbach, Laufach, Rechtenbach, Lohr, Gemünden am Main, Karlstadt am Main, Arnstein, Werneck, Bergrheinfeld, Schweinfurt, Schonungen, Theres, Haßfurt, Zeil am Main, Ebelsbach, Eltmann, Viereth-Trunstadt, Bischberg and Hallstadt.

Just west of Darmstadt the B26 crosses the Bundesautobahn 5 and Bundesautobahn 67, known as the Darmstädter Kreuz (Darmstadt cross).

Until the changing of Luisenplatz (Luis Square) in Darmstadt into pedestrian zone in the 1970s, the B26 road ran through center Darmstadt. In Darmstadt the B26 meets the North-South Highway of Bundesstraße 3, B3. Today, the B26 pass under the Darmstadt city center.

== North eastern bypass Darmstadt ==
As a replacement for the crossing of the Darmstadt city center, a north eastern bypass is planned. It should relieve the downtown area from car and truck traffic. The planned route was to connect the Darmstadt Ostbahnhof and the Martin-Luther-King-ring. Half of this new road will run in a tunnel.

- Near Schonungen the B26 crosses the Bundesstraße 303. Near Bergrheinfeld the B26 cross the A70. Near Gemünden am Main the B26 crosses the Bundesautobahn 7. In the town of Karlstadt am Main the B26 cross the Bundesstraße 27. In Aschaffenburg the B26 cross the Bundesautobahn 3. In Dieburg the B26 crosses the Bundesstraße 45.

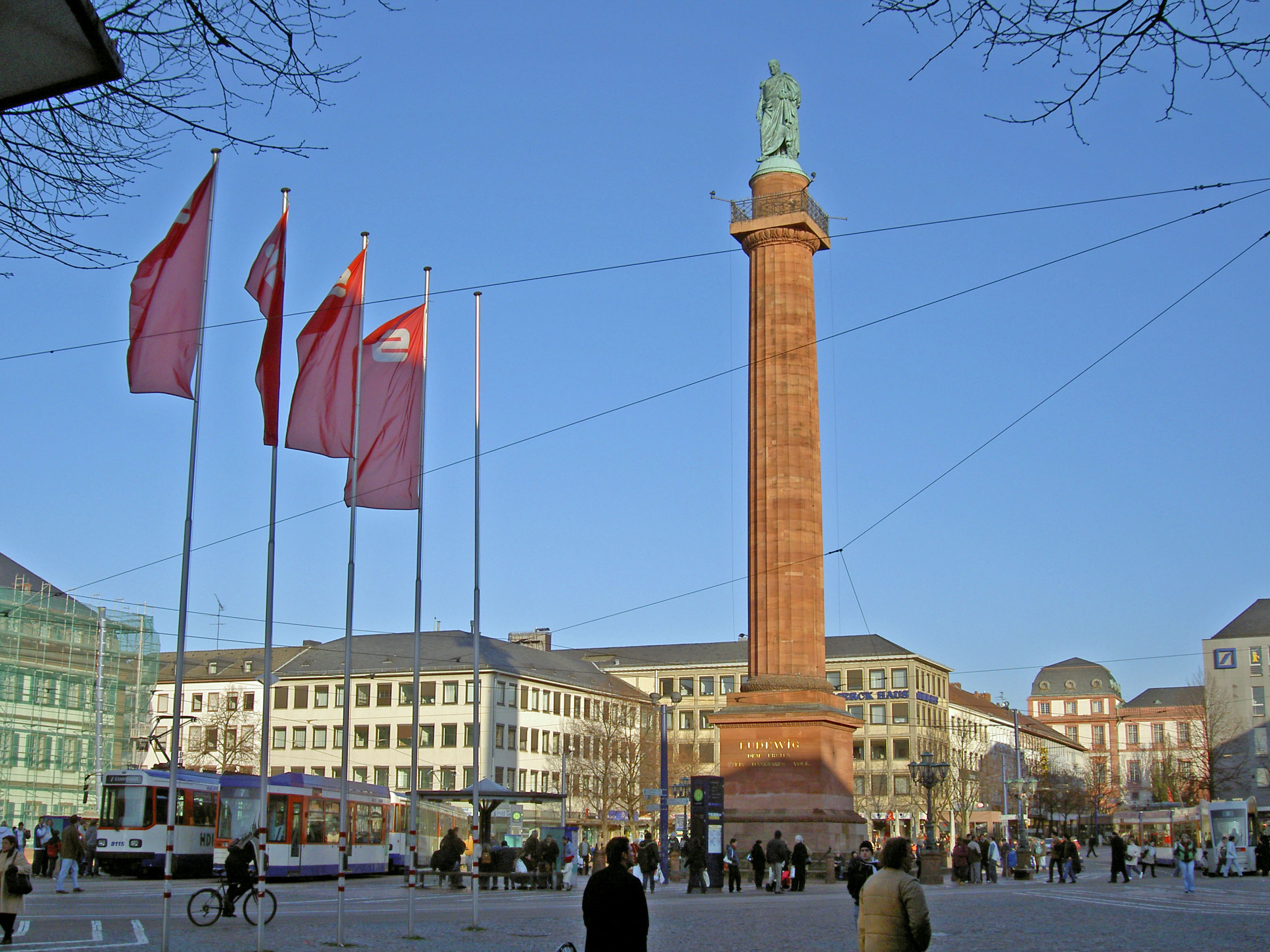
The 'Luisenplatz', main square of Darmstadt. B26 now travels under the plaza, with exits to underground parking.

== See also ==
- Autobahn
- Bundesstraße
- List of federal highways in Germany
