= 1944–45 Aston Villa F.C. season =

Aston Villa
1945–46 season
- Chairman: Fred Normansell
- Stadium: Villa Park
- Football League North: X

The 1944–45 English football season was Aston Villa's sixth season disrupted by World War II. Between 1939 and 1946 normal competitive football was suspended in England. Many footballers signed up to fight in the war and as a result many teams were depleted, and fielded guest players instead. The Football League and FA Cup were suspended and in their place regional league competitions were set up. Appearances in these tournaments did not count in players' official records.

The German prisoner, Hans Leins, recalled his daring 1944 escape from the POW camp in Sutton Park, near Birmingham. Leins worked at the Wilkes factory, Pelsall, where he obtained a raincoat from a fellow worker and escaped by crawling under the barbed wire. The coat enabled him to disguise the camp uniform with its large POW label in big white letters and he was able to walk undetected 'eight to ten miles' before reaching Villa Park. There Leins watched the Saturday match before walking back and crawling under the wire back into captivity. Leins repeated his escapade every other Saturday. His identity was soon discovered by the Villa crowd and he recalled them waiting for him each Saturday with gifts of cigarettes and apples. By 1969 Leins was the 51-year-old Burgomaster of Untersteinach.

== League North ==
26 August 1944	Aston Villa	4–0	Stoke City	Villa Park

2 September 1944	Stoke City	3–1	Aston Villa

4 November 1944	Port Vale	2–1	Aston Villa	Old Recreation Ground

11 November 1944 12	Aston Villa	4–0	Burslem Port Vale	Birmingham
				Stadium: Villa Park; Attendance: 8,500

2 December 1944	Leicester City	0–3	Aston Villa

9 December 1944	Aston Villa	5–0	Leicester City
Note: In five games Villa have scored 22 while conceding zero.

16 December 1944	Aston Villa	5–2	Northampton Town
Note: Aston Villa registered their sixth successive victory.

== Players ==
Frank Moss Junior had enlisted in the Royal Navy. In 1944–45, he made 15 guest appearances for Southampton.
