= Werneck =

- Municipality
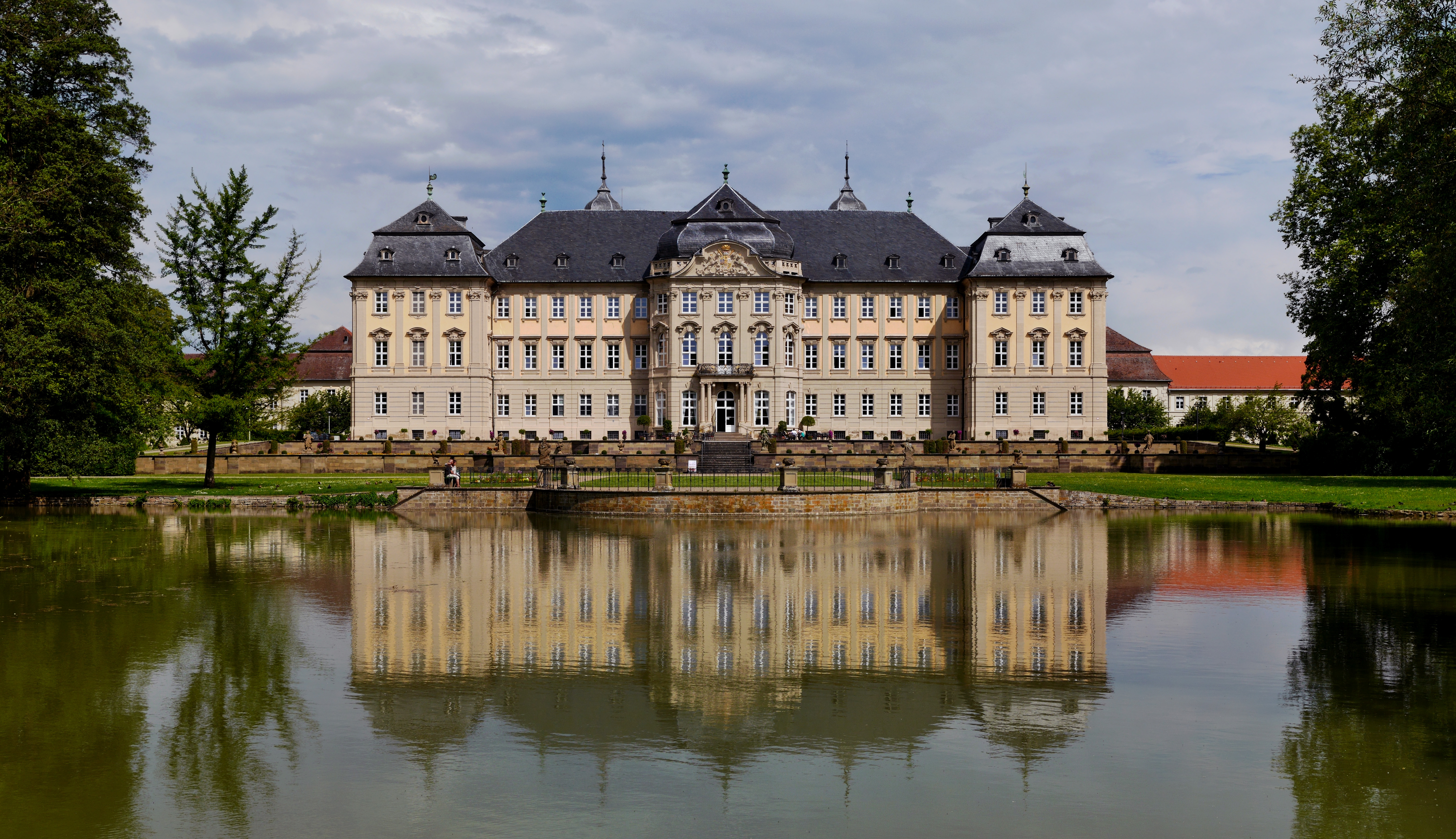
- Werneck Palace in Werneck, by Balthasar Neumann

- Coat of arms

- Location of Werneck within Schweinfurt district
- Interactive map of Werneck
- Location within Germany Location within Bavaria
- Coordinates: 49°59′N 10°6′E
- Country: Germany
- State: Bavaria
- Admin. region: Unterfranken
- District: Schweinfurt

Government
  - Mayor (2020–26): Sebastian Hauck (CSU)

Area
  - Total: 73.56 km^{2} (28.40 sq mi)
- Elevation: 222 m (728 ft)

Population (2025-12-31)
  - Total: 10,056
  - Density: 136.7/km^{2} (354.1/sq mi)
- Time zone: UTC+01:00 (CET)
  - Summer (DST): UTC+02:00 (CEST)
- Postal codes: 97440
- Dialling codes: 09722
- Vehicle registration: SW
- Website: www.werneck.de

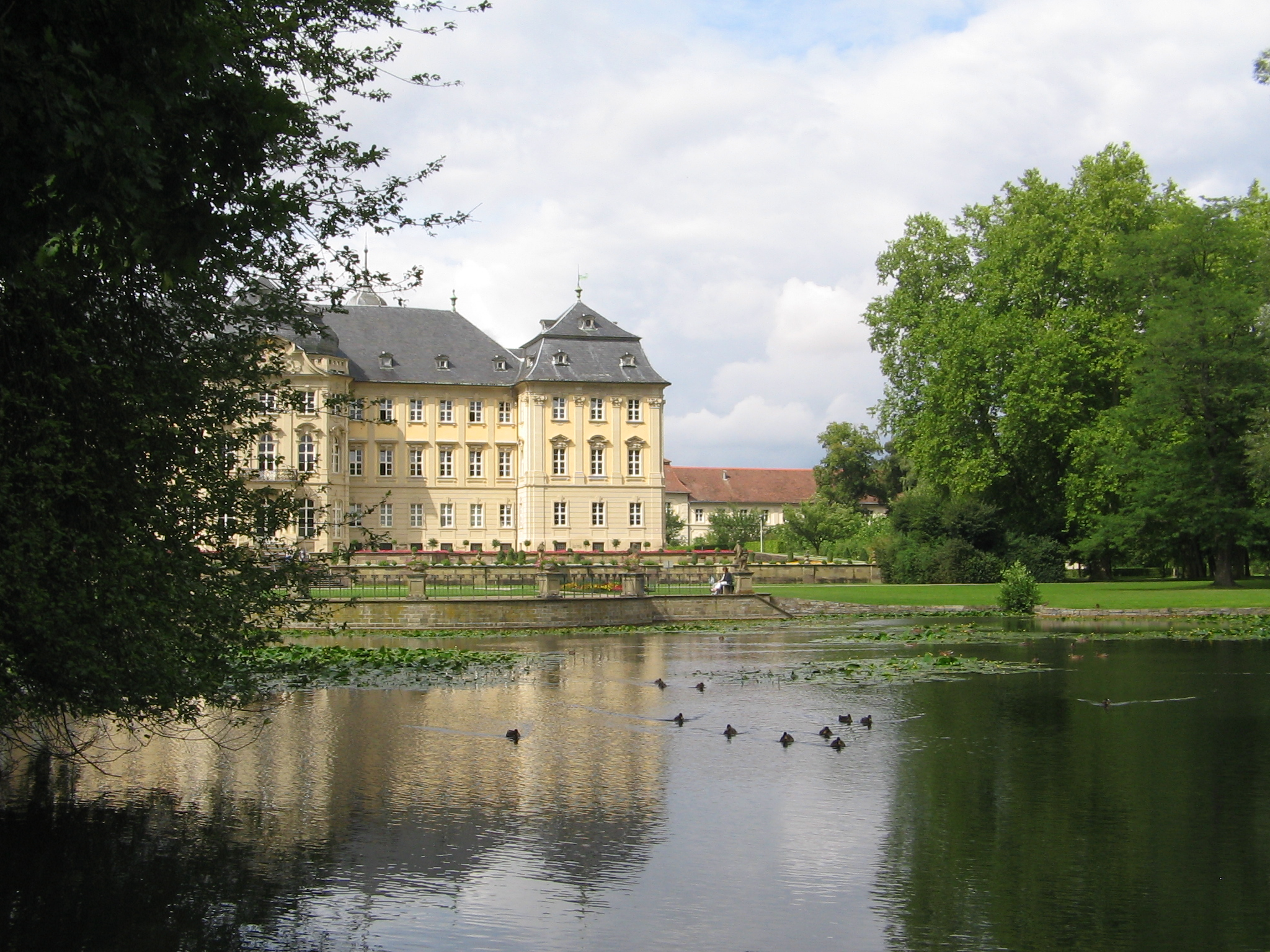
Garden view of the palace

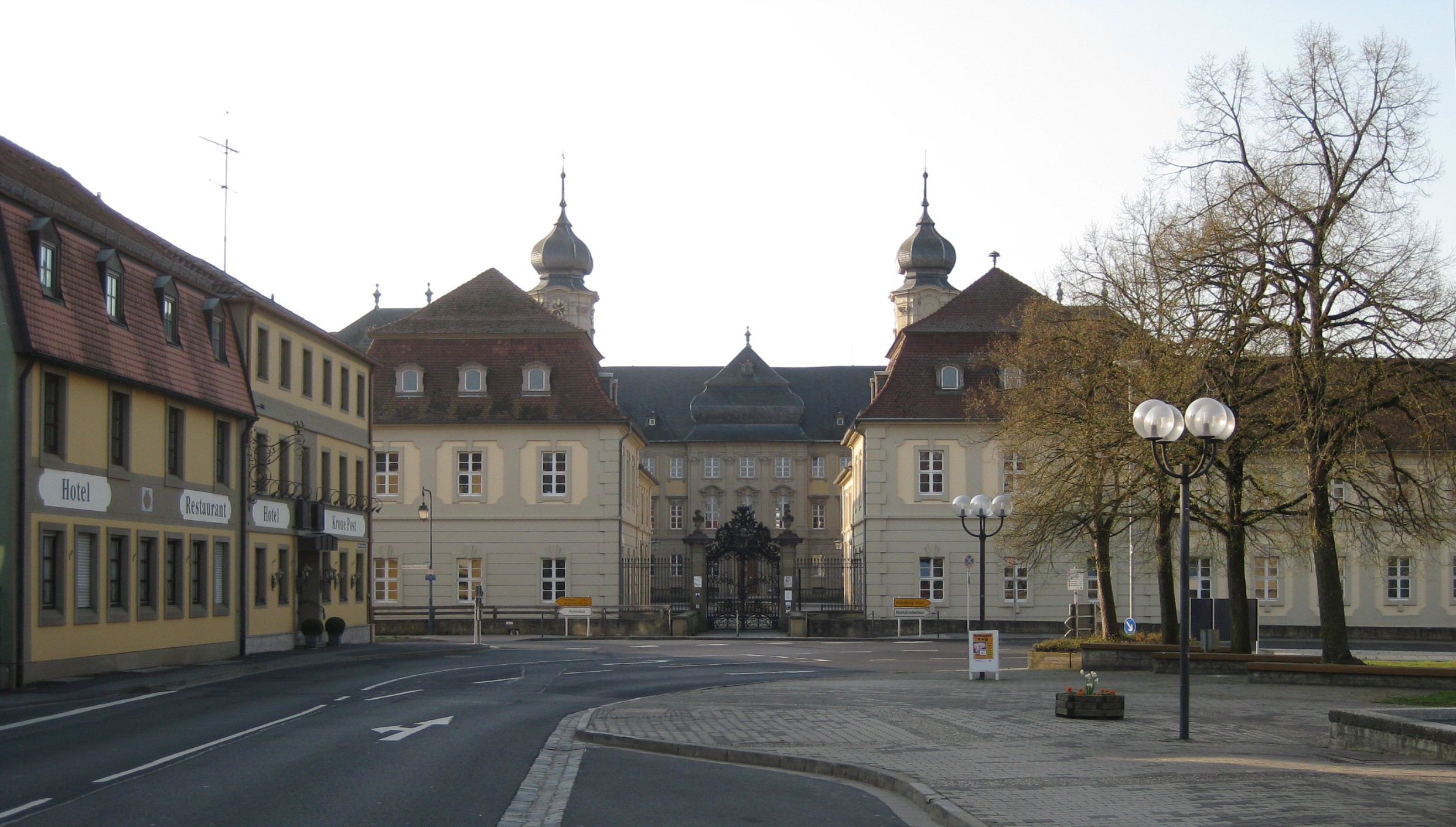
View of the palace from the old marketplace of Werneck, Balthasar-Neumann-Platz

Werneck is a market town in the district of Schweinfurt in Lower Franconia, Bavaria, Germany. It has a population of around 10,000 and is best known for its Baroque palace, Schloss Werneck.

== Geography ==
=== Location ===
Werneck lies in the Lower Franconia region of Bavaria, approximately 12 km from Schweinfurt and 25 km from Würzburg. It is located on a bend in the Wern, a tributary of the Main, on the edge of the plateau above the river. Its highest point is at 337.20 m of elevation, its lowest at 212.50 m. The total area of the municipality is 73.65 km², of which approximately 9 km² are wooded.

=== Subdivisions ===
Werneck has the following Ortsteile:

- Eckartshausen
- Egenhausen
- Ettleben
- Eßleben
- Mühlhausen
- Rundelshausen
- Schleerieth
- Schnackenwerth
- Schraudenbach
- Stettbach
- Vasbühl
- Werneck
- Zeuzleben

== History ==
The first written record of Werneck is dated 10 August 1223, as a fief granted by Bodo of Ravensburg, confirmed by the Pope on 9 April 1223. Between 1224 and 1250, possession of the fief was shared between first the Teutonic Knights and later Conrad of Reichenberg and Conrad of Schmiedefeld, until it finally passed to the Bishopric of Würzburg. A fort located there was sacked in the Peasants' War in 1525 and then seized and burnt down by Albert Alcibiades, Margrave of Brandenburg-Kulmbach in 1553. It was rebuilt in 1601 under Prince-Bishop Julius Echter von Mespelbrunn, but was again destroyed by fire in 1723 and merely patched up in 1724.

The current baroque palace, Schloss Werneck, designed by Balthasar Neumann, was built in 1733–45 by Prince Bishop Friedrich Karl von Schönborn. For half a century it was, with Veitshöchheim, a summer residence of the Bishops of Würzburg. On 28 November 1802, the last Prince-Bishop of Würzburg, Georg Karl von Fechenbach, released his vassals there from their oaths of service and recommended them to the new regional overlord, Maximilian, Prince-Elector of Bavaria.

In 1803, following secularisation, Werneck became a Bavarian possession. In 1805 it was transferred to Ferdinand III, Grand Duke of Tuscany as part of the formation of the Grand Duchy of Würzburg. The Treaty of Paris in 1814 returned it to Bavaria.

Beginning in 1853, the palace was converted into a hospital for the mentally ill, the Unterfränkische Landes-Irrenanstalt (Lower Franconian State Asylum), which opened on 1 October 1855. Its first director was Bernhard von Gudden (who later wrote the clinical assessment which justified deposing King Ludwig II and who drowned with him in Lake Starnberg). The hospital is thus one of the oldest psychiatric institutions in Germany. In 1940, the approximately 800 patients were murdered on the orders of Otto Hellmuth, Gauleiter of Mainfranken, as part of the Nazi elimination of mentally ill and handicapped people, Action T4.

== Demographics ==
Werneck is predominantly Roman Catholic. A Jewish congregation existed in Werneck from the 16th century until 1904.

== Culture and sights ==
=== Buildings ===
- Schloss Werneck - The grounds of the palace, including the Baroque garden and English-style park, may be visited, as may part of the palace, chiefly the chapel, which dates to 1744.
- Former palace in Vasbühl, built in 1677
- Fortified churches in Schleerieth und Schnackenwerth

The tithe barn (built in 1628) was converted into a church in 1856. There has been a parish since 1910; a new parish church was consecrated in 1967. The Church of St. Bartholomew in Zeuzleben was built in 1753–1754.

=== Others ===
- Sandstone shrines
- Merovingian cemetery in Zeuzleben

=== Music ===
The Musikverein Werneck has a wind band and a young people's wind band, and a variety of beginners' musical groups.

The Bayerische Kammerorchester Bad Brückenau (Bad Brückenau Chamber Orchestra of Bavaria) was founded in 1979 as the Kammerorchester Schloß Werneck (Schloss Werneck Chamber Orchestra) and was formerly based in Werneck.

== Economy ==
Although the villages within the municipality of Werneck are still agricultural in character, there have been several decades of economic dependency on industries in Schweinfurt, to which many residents commute. In 1998, the municipality had 8 agricultural and forestry jobs, 595 production jobs and 228 trade and transport jobs subject to social insurance; 1,555 were employed there in other fields. A total of 3,559 residents held jobs subject to social insurance. There were 2 businesses engaged in the harvesting of natural resources (such as mining and quarrying) and 10 in construction. In addition in 1999 there were 195 agricultural businesses, utilising 6,382 km², of which 5,681 km² was cropland and 672 km² permanently planted (pasturage, orchards, etc.)

== Infrastructure ==
=== Transport ===
Werneck is located at the Werneck Autobahn junction, where the A 7 and A 70 merge; in addition, the A 71 has passed close by since its Werntal connection to the A 70 opened in November 2005. Bundesstraßen B 19, B 26 and B 26a pass through Werneck. On 16 December 2007 the Werneck bypass on the B 19 was opened.

There is a railway station on the Schweinfurt - Würzburg line in the centre of Eßleben and another very close to Werneck proper, on its border with Waigolshausen. The Werntalbahn (Wern Valley Railway), now used mainly for goods traffic, runs through the municipality.

=== Health care ===
Today the psychiatric clinic (Krankenhaus für Psychiatrie, Psychotherapie und Psychosomatische Medizin Schloss Werneck) is operated by the Administrative Region of Lower Franconia and serves northeast Lower Franconia (Schweinfurt, Hassberge, Rhön-Grabfeld, Bad Kissingen and Kitzingen, with a total population of 500,000) with a modern 290-bed building, while the palace houses the Lower Franconia orthopaedic clinic (Orthopädische Klinik Schloss Werneck), one of the largest such facilities in Germany, with 153 beds. There are also care homes for psychiatric and senile dementia patients (Albert-Schweitzer-Haus, Haus Erthal and Haus Schönborn) on the grounds. Together these facilities are the largest source of employment in Werneck.

== Education ==
In 1999, Werneck had 459 kindergarten spaces with 434 pupils, two Volksschulen with 973 pupils and the Lower Franconian school of nursing.

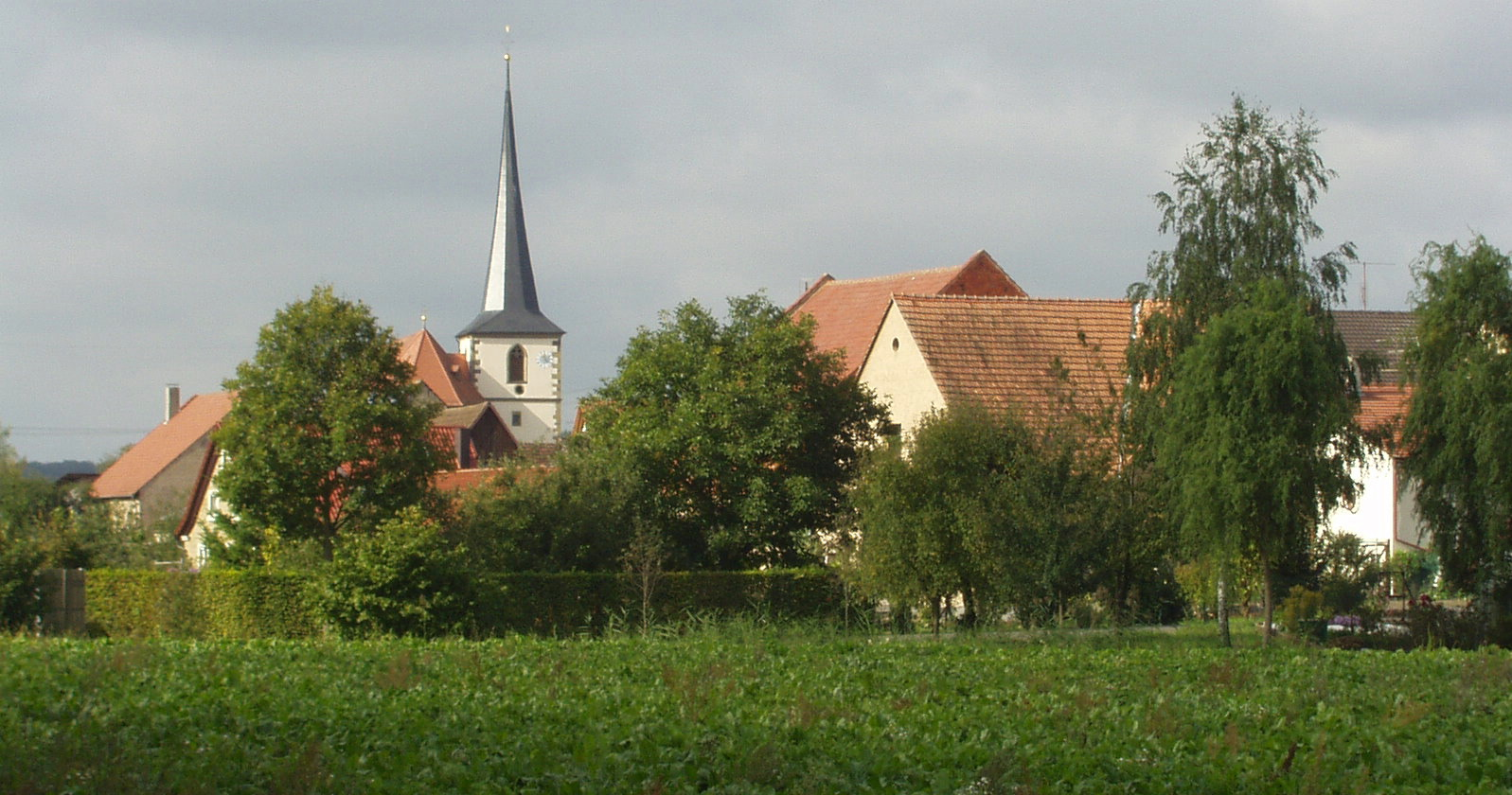
View of Zeuzleben

== Notable people ==
- Friedrich Fehr (1862-1927), artist
- Harald Ganzinger (1950-2004), computer scientist
- Gerhard Launer (born 1949), aerial photographer
- Winfried Bonengel (born 1960), film and TV director
- Sebastian Remelé (born 1969), mayor of Schweinfurt
- Jesse Schmitt (born 1972), American educator
- Christian Wück (born 1973), former footballer and since 2002 coach
- Tobias Oertel (born 1975), actor
- Jens Sobisch (born 1977), author (non-fiction)
- Christopher Schadewaldt (born 1984), ice hockey player
