= Bundesautobahn 70 =

Federal motorway in Germany

A 70
- Bundesautobahn 70
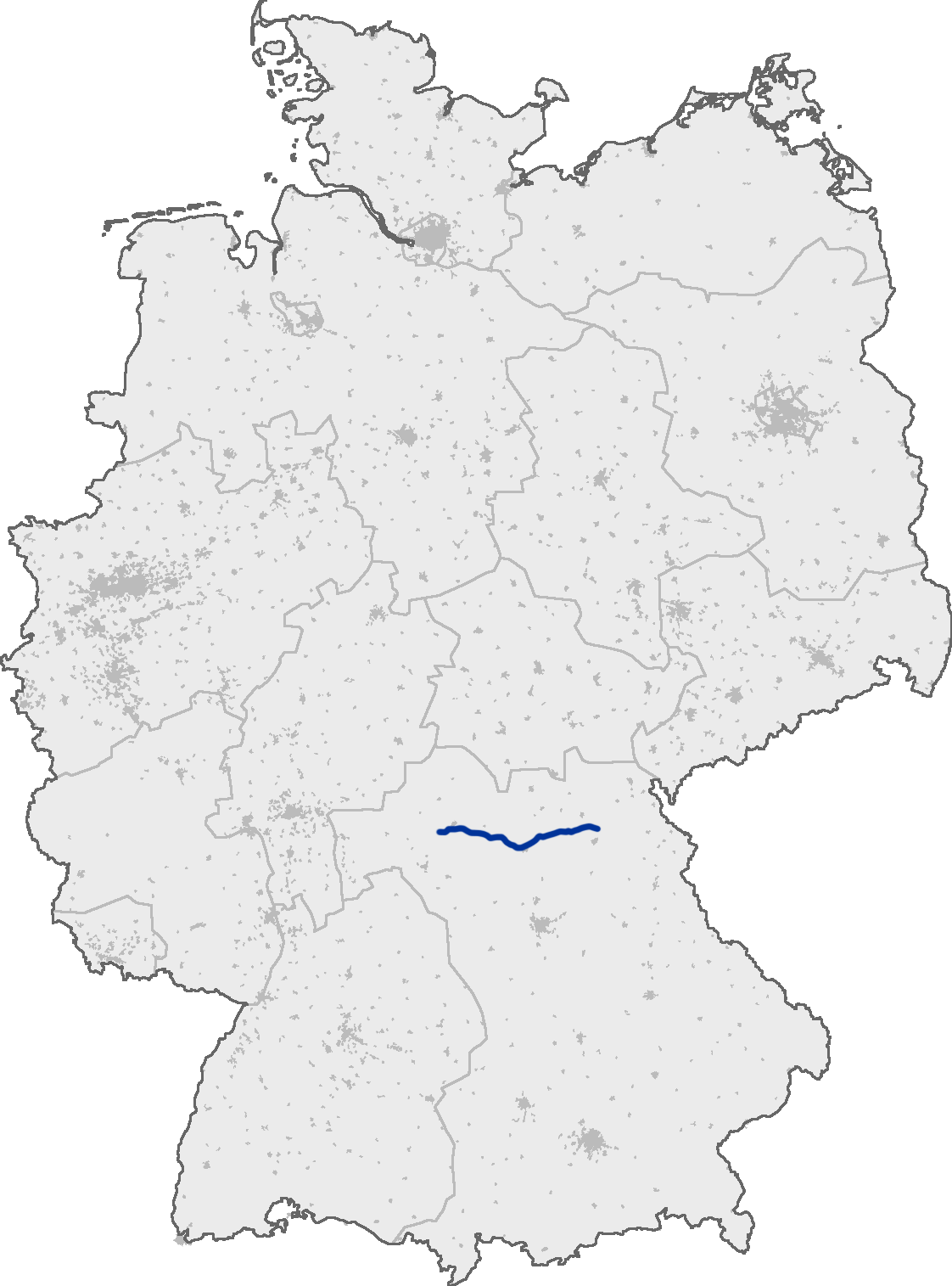

Route information
- Length: 120 km (75 mi)

Major junctions
- West end: A 7 in Werneck
- East end: A 9 in Harsdorf

Location
- Country: Germany
- States: Bavaria

Highway system
- Roads in Germany; Autobahns; List; Federal; List; State; E-roads
← A 67	→ A 71

Bundesautobahn 70 (translates from German as Federal Motorway 70, short form Autobahn 70, abbreviated as BAB 70 or A 70) is an autobahn in southern Germany, connecting the A 7 via Schweinfurt and Bamberg to the A 9.

In the future, this autobahn could be extended to Schirnding where it would connect to the D6 motorway (Czech Republic) which is to be completed in 2031. This motorway link is supported by the Czech government, the Karlovy Vary regional government, and by municipalities on both sides of the border. However, these plans have not been approved by the German government with international negotiations ongoing. If approved, only the 20 km section between D6 and A93 is expected to be constructed initially.

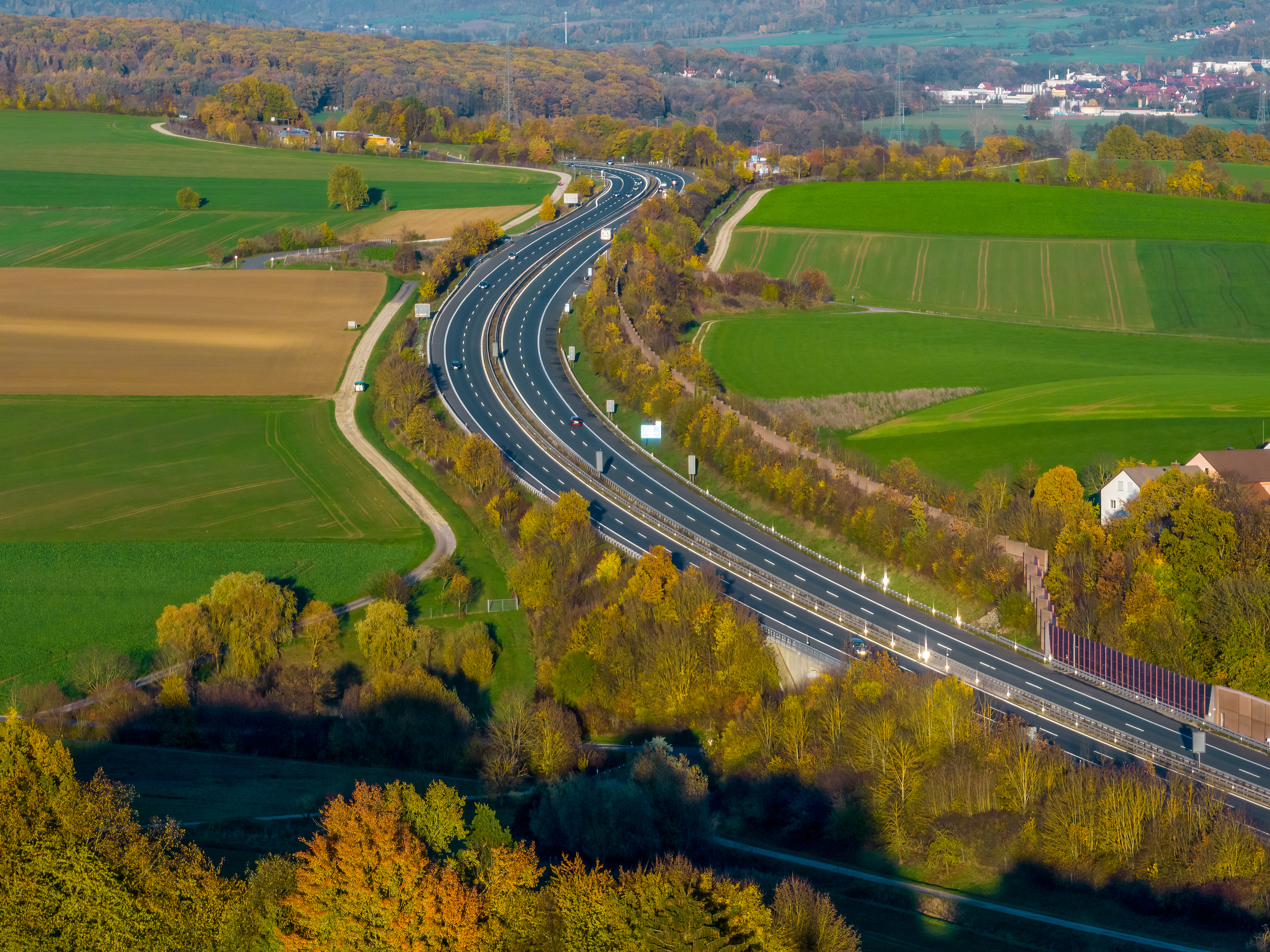
A70 near Memmelsdorf in Upper Franconia.

== Exit list ==
Legend:

- I/C - Interchange, I/S - Intersection, RSA - Rest and service area, OBR - Overhead bridge restaurant, R/R - Restaurant and rest plaza, L/B - Layby, V/P - Vista point, TN - tunnel, T/P - Toll plaza, BR - Bridge
- C - Cloverleaf, S - Stack, T-A - Trumpet-A, T-B - Trumpet-B, DT - Directional-T/Y, SDT - Semi-Directional-T/Y, P-Y - Partial-Y, D - Diamond, P-C - Partial cloverleaf, D-D - Diverging diamond, D-R - Direct ramp

Km	Exit	Name	Destinations	Notes
	2	Schweinfurt/Werneck	A 7 B 26a	4-way interchange
	3	Werneck	B 19	
	BR	Wernbrücke		529 m/1736ft
	4	Werntal	A 71	3-way interchange
	5	Schweinfurt / Bergrheinfeld	B 26	
	BR	Mainbrücke		375 m
	6	Schweinfurt-Hafen-Ost		
	7	Schweinfurt-Zentrum	B 286	
	8	Gochsheim		
	9	Schonungen	B 303	
	BR	Talbrücke		180 m
	BR	Herrnseegrabentalbrücke		530 m/1739ft
	RSA	Rest area		
	10	Haßfurt		
	11	Knetzgau		
	BR	Talbrücke		150 m(492ft)/160 m(525ft)
	12	Eltmann	B 26	
	BR	Talbrücke		200 m/656ft
	BR	Talbrücke		230 m/755ft
	13	Viereth-Trunstadt		
	BR	Talbrücke		160 m/525ft
	BR	Mainbrücke		610 m/2001 ft
	14	Bamberg-Hafen	B 26	
	15	Hallstadt	B 4	
	16	Bamberg	B 22	
	17	Bamberg	A 73; B 173	4-way interchange
	RSA	Rest area		
	18	Scheßlitz	B 22	
	BR	Hangbrücke Würgau		413 m/1355ft
	19	Roßdorf am Berg		
	20	Stadelhofen		
	21	Schirradorf		
	22	Thurnau-West		
	BR	Talbrücke		120 m
	23	Thurnau-Ost		
	24	Kulmbach / Neudrossenfeld	B 85	
	25	Harsdorf		Planned
	26	Bayreuth/Kulmbach	A 9	3-way interchange
