= Bundesautobahn 672 =

Federal motorway in Germany

A 672
- Bundesautobahn 672

Route information
- Length: 2 km (1.2 mi)

Location
- Country: Germany
- States: Hesse

Highway system
- Roads in Germany; Autobahns; List; Federal; List; State; E-roads

The Bundesautobahn 672 (translates from German as Federal Motorway 672, short form Autobahn 672, abbreviated as BAB 672 or A 672) is an autobahn in Germany and connects the A 67 and the A 5 with Darmstadt. With a length of a little less than 2 km, it is one of the shortest Autobahns.

== Exit list ==
(1)	Darmstadt/Griesheim 3-way interchange A 67
(2)	Darmstadt 3-way interchange A 5
(3)	Darmstadt-West
B 26	Road continues as the B 26 into Darmstadt
