= Seßlach =

- Town
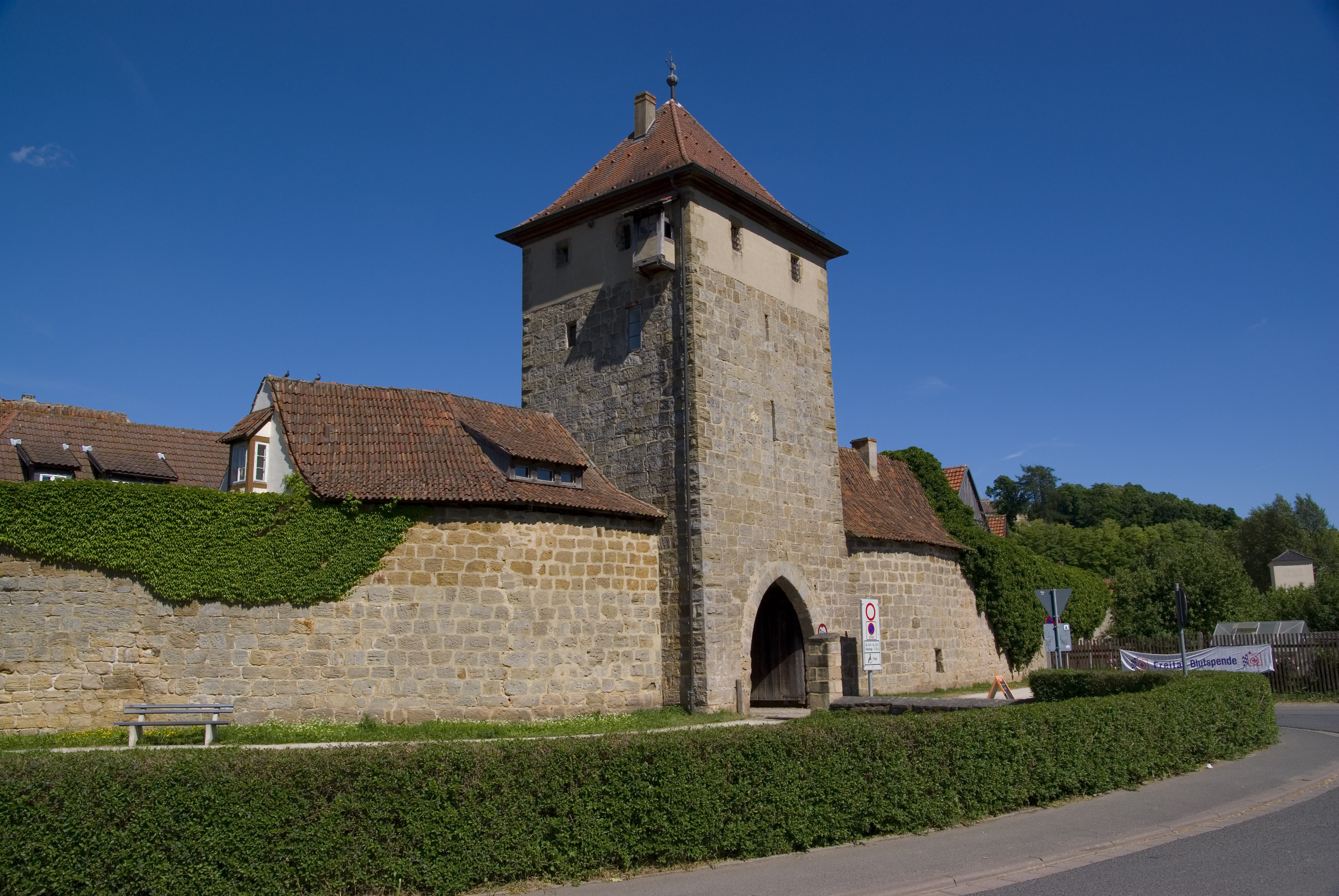
- Town gate

- Coat of arms

- Location of Seßlach within Coburg district
- Interactive map of Seßlach
- Location within Germany Location within Bavaria
- Coordinates: 50°10′N 10°50′E
- Country: Germany
- State: Bavaria
- Admin. region: Oberfranken
- District: Coburg
- Subdivisions: 14 villages one town

Government
  - Mayor (2019–25): Maximilian Neeb (FW)

Area
  - Total: 72.53 km^{2} (28.00 sq mi)
- Elevation: 271 m (889 ft)

Population (2025-12-31)
  - Total: 3,763
  - Density: 51.88/km^{2} (134.4/sq mi)
- Time zone: UTC+01:00 (CET)
  - Summer (DST): UTC+02:00 (CEST)
- Postal codes: 96145
- Dialling codes: 09569
- Vehicle registration: CO
- Website: www.sesslach.de

Seßlach (German pronunciation: [ˈzɛslax]) is a town in the district of Coburg, in northern Bavaria, Germany. It is situated 12 km southwest of Coburg and has a population close to 4,000.

Seßlach is notable for its largely intact medieval town wall and overall historic appearance with few modern structures.

== Geography ==
=== Location ===
Seßlach is located in Upper Franconia. To the north, the municipal territory borders on Thuringia. To the west and south lies the district Haßberge.

=== Subdivisions ===
Seßlach consists of 17 Stadtteile:
(inhabitants as of July 2015)

- Autenhausen (312)
- Bischwind (101)
- Dietersdorf (426)
- Eckersdorf (25)
- Gemünda (522)
- Gleismuthhausen (99)
- Hattersdorf (133)
- Heilgersdorf (454)
- Krumbach (74)
- Lechenroth (73)
- Merlach (83)
- Oberelldorf (142)
- Rothenberg (94)
- Seßlach (1,248)
- Setzelsdorf (36)
- Unterelldorf (146)
- Wiesen (25)

== History ==
The first written mention of the two settlements on the Kirchhügel (church hill) and the Geiersberg (vulture hill) comes from the year 800. The Abbess Emhild of the monastery Milz transferred the monasterial properties by this certificate to Fulda Abbey.

In 1335, the emperor Ludwig der Bayer awarded Seßlach the status of town. This gave the residents the permission to fortify their settlement which they soon did. By 1343 the first town gate had been erected. Later that century, the town became the seat of an Amt and a Centgericht of the Prince-Bishop of Würzburg.

Seßlach was part of the Hochstift Würzburg until secularization in 1803. Over the centuries, the town suffered more under the German Peasants' War (1525) than nearby Coburg and was also damaged and plundered during the Thirty Years' War, the Seven Years' War and the Napoleonic Wars.

In 1810, the Amt Seßlach came to the Kingdom of Bavaria and gradually lost importance. In 1812, an Amtsgericht was established but in the 1929 Staatsreform it was sidelined. In 1972, Seßlach became part of the Landkreis Coburg.

== Attractions ==
Seßlach is notable for its largely intact medieval town wall and overall historic appearance with few modern structures. It features many half-timbered buildings. The parish church, St. Johannes, was built in the 13th century and later redesigned in Baroque style.

The 2006 movie of The Robber Hotzenplotz was filmed in Seßlach.

== Infrastructure ==
=== Transport ===
Bundesstrasse 303 passes through the municipal territory north of the town itself.
