= Untersteinach (Verwaltungsgemeinschaft) =

- Verwaltungsgemeinschaft
- Location of Untersteinach within Kulmbach district
- Interactive map of Untersteinach
- Location within Germany Location within Bavaria
- Coordinates: 50°08′N 11°31′E
- Country: Germany
- State: Bavaria
- Admin. region: Upper Franconia
- District: Kulmbach
- Seat: Untersteinach
- Subdivisions: 4 municipalities

Area
  - Total: 36.32 km^{2} (14.02 sq mi)

Population (2025-12-31)
  - Total: 4,154
  - Density: 114.4/km^{2} (296.2/sq mi)
- Time zone: UTC+01:00 (CET)
  - Summer (DST): UTC+02:00 (CEST)
- Website: www.vg-untersteinach.de

Untersteinach is a Verwaltungsgemeinschaft (municipal association) in the district of Kulmbach in Bavaria, Germany. Its seat is in Untersteinach.

It consists of the following municipalities:

1. Guttenberg
2. Kupferberg
3. Ludwigschorgast
4. Untersteinach
