= Rennsteig Tunnel =

Road tunnel in Germany

Coordinates: 50°41′43″N 10°44′06″E

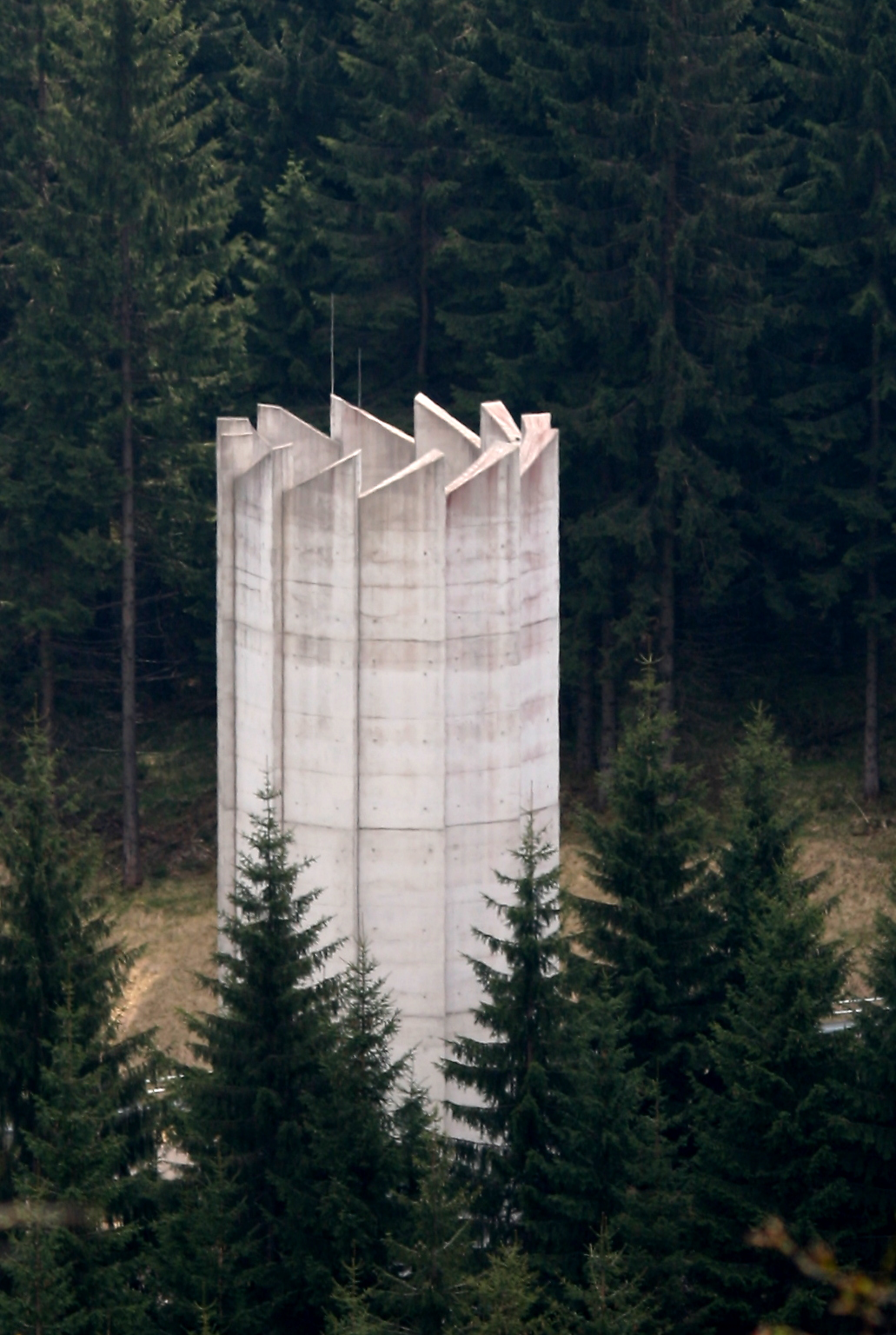
Ventilation tower

Rennsteig Tunnel (German: Rennsteigtunnel) is the longest road tunnel in Germany with a length of 7,878 meters (4.919 mi).

The Rennsteig Tunnel is part of the motorway Autobahn A 71 between Gräfenroda and Oberhof in Thuringia. It is also called the Christiane Tunnel for its "godmother" Christiane Herzog, wife of the former German President Roman Herzog.

The tunnel was built between 26 June 1998 and 5 July 2003, when it was opened by German chancellor Gerhard Schröder.

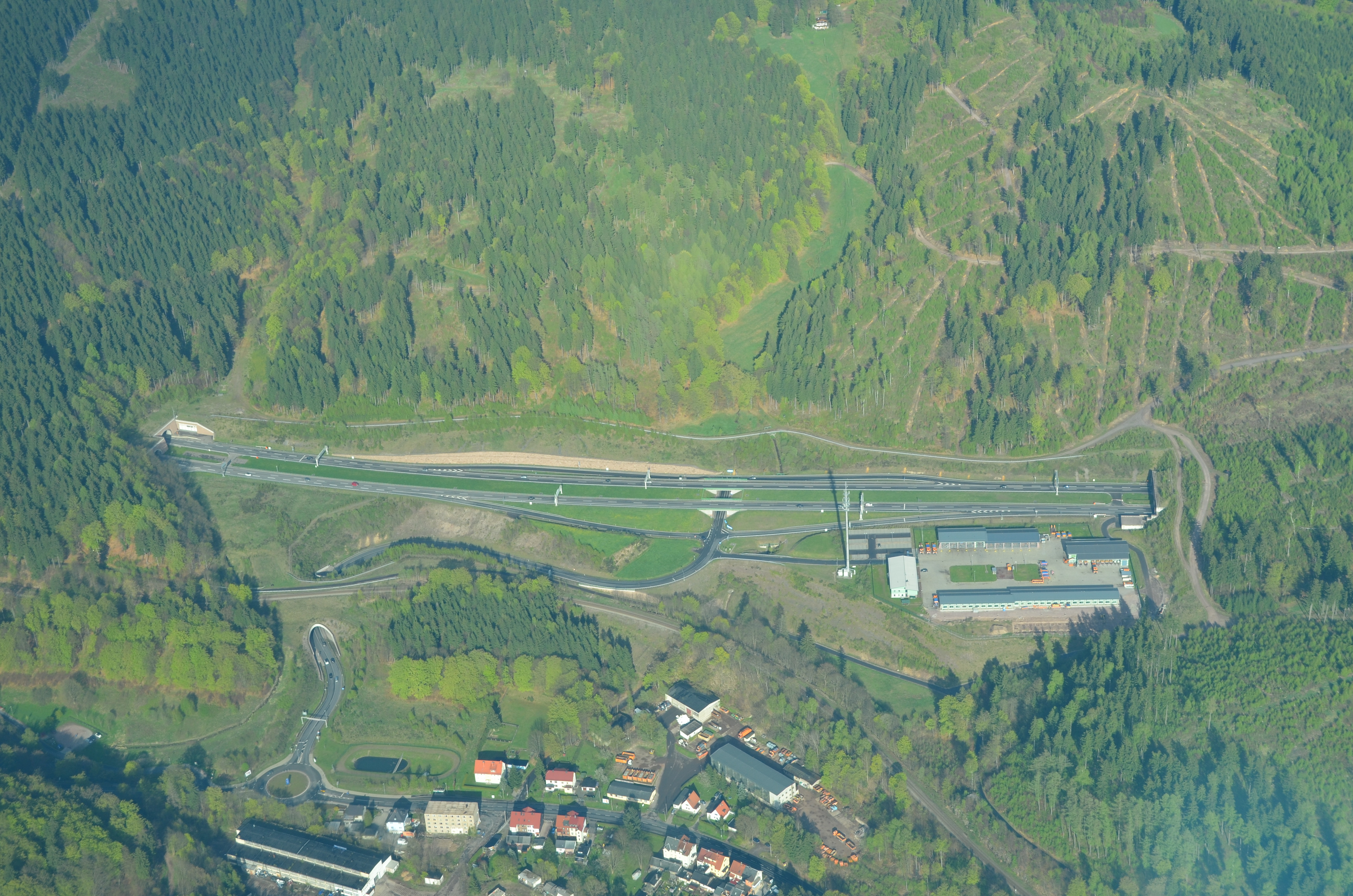
Exit #18 Oberhof, left Rennsteig Tunnel

It was part of the traffic project German unity ("Verkehrsprojekt Deutsche Einheit") and cost 210 million euros.

The German automobile club ADAC voted the Rennsteig Tunnel in 2004 as Europe's safest tunnel.
