= Bundesautobahn 71 =

Federal motorway in Germany

A 71
- Bundesautobahn 71

Route information
- Length: 220 km (140 mi)

Major junctions
- From: Sangerhausen
- To: A 70 near Schweinfurt

Location
- Country: Germany
- States: Saxony-Anhalt, Thuringia, Bavaria
- Major cities: Artern, Heldrungen, Kölleda, Sömmerda, Erfurt, Arnstadt, Ilmenau, Geraberg, Oberhof, Zella-Mehlis, Suhl, Meiningen, Mellrichstadt, Bad Neustadt, Münnerstadt, Bad Kissingen

Highway system
- Roads in Germany; Autobahns; List; Federal; List; State; E-roads
← A 70	→ A 72

Bundesautobahn 71 (translates from German as Federal Motorway 71, short form Autobahn 71, abbreviated as BAB 71 or A 71) is an Autobahn in Germany. It connects the A 38 and Erfurt to the A 70 near Schweinfurt. A further northern extension to the A 14 near Plötzkau has been proposed by the state government of Sachsen-Anhalt.

Construction on the A 71, supervised by DEGES, began in 1996, most parts were being opened by December 2005. The project was completed in September 2015. The section through the Thuringian Forest was the most expensive road ever built in Germany with an average cost of €10 million per kilometre (€16,000,000/mi). This section includes the Rennsteig Tunnel which is the longest road tunnel in Germany at 8 km (5.0 mi) and is called "Thüringer wald Autobahn" (Thuringian Forest Motorway).

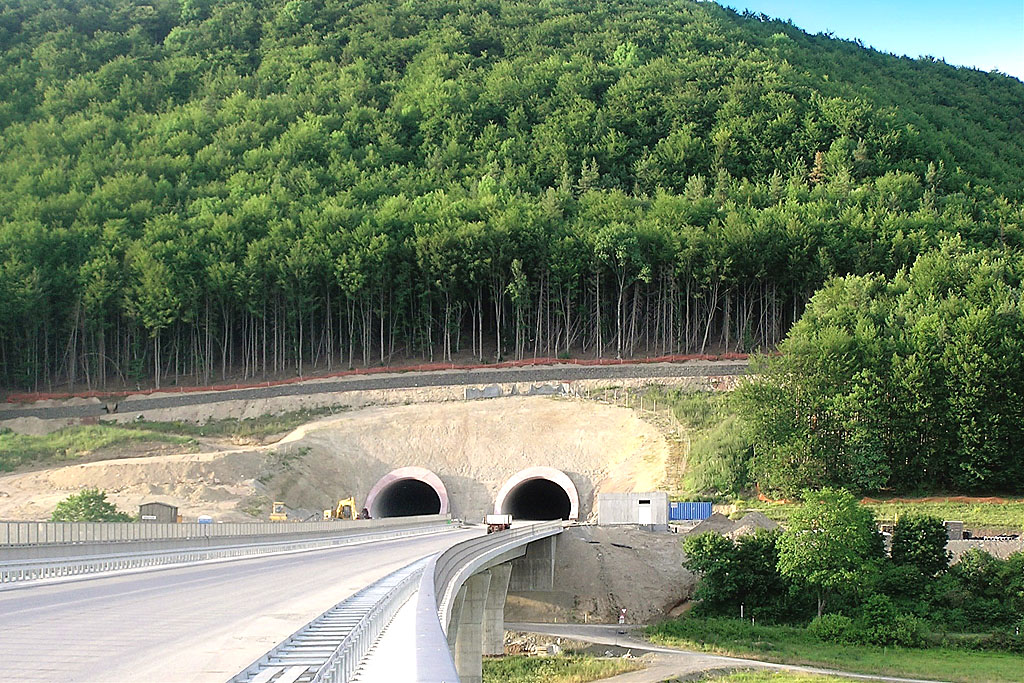
Southern mouth of the Eichelberg tunnel near the town of Meiningen, seen from Jüchsetal bridge

== Exit list ==
Legend:

- I/C - Interchange, I/S - Intersection, RSA - Rest and service area, OBR - Overhead bridge restaurant, R/R - Restaurant and rest plaza, L/B - Layby, V/P - Vista point, TN - tunnel, T/P - Toll plaza, BR - Bridge
- C - Cloverleaf, S - Stack, T-A - Trumpet-A, T-B - Trumpet-B, DT - Directional-T/Y, SDT - Semi-Directional-T/Y, P-Y - Partial-Y, D - Diamond, P-C - Partial cloverleaf, D-D - Diverging diamond, D-R - Direct ramp

Exit	Name
(1)	Südharz 3-way interchange A 38
(2)	Artern
(3)	Heldrungen
TN	Schmücketunnel 1725m/5660ft
(4)	Kölleda
Under construction	Rest area Leubinger Fürtsenhügel (under construction)
(5)	Sömmerda-Ost B 176
(6)	Sömmerda-Süd
(7)	Erfurt-Nord B 7
(8)	Erfurt-Stotternheim
(9)	Erfurt-Mittelhausen
(10)	Erfurt-Gispersleben B 4
(11)	Erfurt-Bindersleben B 7
BR	Talbrücke Apfelstädt
(12)	Erfurt 4-way interchange A 4
(13)	Arnstadt-Nord
(14)	Arnstadt-Süd
TN	Tunnel Behringen
BR	Wipfratalbrücke
	Stadtilm (under construction) B 90
(15)	Ilmenau-Ost B 88
BR	Altwipfergrund Viaduct
BR	Streichgrund Viaduct
(16)	Ilmenau-West
BR	Reichenbach Viaduct
BR	Zahme Gera Viaduct
	Services Thüringer Wald
(17)	Gräfenroda B 88
TN	Tunnel Alte Burg
BR	Schwarzbachtal Viaduct
BR	Wilde Gera Viaduct
TN	Rennsteig Tunnel
(18)	Oberhof
TN	Hochwald Tunnel
(19)	Suhl/Zella-Mehlis B 62
BR	Steinatal Viaduct
TN	Tunnel Berg Bock
(20)	Suhl 3-way interchange A 73
BR	Albrechtsgraben Viaduct
BR	Seßlerstal Viaduct
BR	Schafstalgrund Viaduct
BR	Streitschlag Viaduct
BR	Schwarza Viaduct
BR	Rotes Tal Viaduct
BR	Talbrücke Schindgraben (stone quarry)
(21)	Meiningen-Nord B 19
BR	Judental Viaduct
BR	Haseltal Viaduct
BR	Werratal Viaduct
(22)	Meiningen-Süd B 89
TN	Tunnel Eichelberg
BR	Jüchsen Viaduct
BR	Bibra Viaduct
(23)	Rentwertshausen
	Services Mellrichstadt
(24)	Mellrichstadt B 285
BR	Bahratalbrücke
BR	Saaletalbrücke
(25)	Bad Neustadt B 279
(26)	Münnerstadt B 287
BR	Lautertalbrücke
(27)	Maßbach
BR	Thalwassertalbrücke
(28)	Bad Kissingen B 286
BR	Pfersdorf Viaduct
BR	Maibach Viaduct
(29)	Poppenhausen B 286
BR	Wernbrücke Kronungen
(30)	Schweinfurt-West B 303
BR	Wernbrücke Geldersheim
(31)	Dreieck Werntal A 70

== Characteristics ==
=== Buildings at Thuringian forest ===
While crossing the Thuringian Forest are a lot of large engineering works needed, the most notable are listed in the table below.

km	mi	Building	Length	Max. height
92,5	575	Behringen Tunnel	465 metres (1,526 ft)	
94,0	580	Wipfra viaduct	176 metres (577 ft)	15 metres (49 ft)
101,5	631	Altwipfergrund viaduct	278 metres (912 ft)	35 metres (115 ft)
102,5	637	Streichgrund viaduct	449 metres (1,473 ft); 450 metres (1,480 ft)	28 metres (92 ft)
107,0	660	Reichenbach viaduct	1,000 metres (3,300 ft)	60 metres (200 ft)
108,5	674	Zahme Gera viaduct	520 metres (1,710 ft)	63 metres (207 ft)
112,0	700	Alte Burg Tunnel	874 metres (2,867 ft); 866 metres (2,841 ft)	
113,5	705	Schwarzbachtal viaduct	352 metres (1,155 ft); 322 metres (1,056 ft)	71 metres (233 ft)
114,0	710	Wilde Gera viaduct	552 metres (1,811 ft)	110 metres (360 ft)
114,5	711	Rennsteig Tunnel	7,916 metres (25,971 ft); 7,878 metres (25,846 ft)	
123,5	767	Hochwald Tunnel	1,056 metres (3,465 ft)	
126,0	780	Steinatal viaduct	445 metres (1,460 ft)	20 metres (66 ft)
126,5	786	Berg Bock Tunnel	2,738 metres (8,983 ft); 2,718 metres (8,917 ft)	
131,0	810	Albrechtsgraben viaduct	770 metres (2,530 ft)	80 metres (260 ft)
133,5	830	Seßlestal viaduct	320 metres (1,050 ft)	53 metres (174 ft)
135,0	840	Schafstalgrund viaduct	525 metres (1,722 ft)	61 metres (200 ft)
137,0	850	Streitschlag viaduct	256 metres (840 ft)	33 metres (108 ft)
140,0	870	Schwarza viaduct	675 metres (2,215 ft)	68 metres (223 ft)
142,0	880	Rotes Tal viaduct	406 metres (1,332 ft)	19 metres (62 ft)
144,0	890	Schindgraben viaduct (stone quarry)	464 metres (1,522 ft)	55 metres (180 ft)
145,0	900	Judental viaduct	456 metres (1,496 ft)	45 metres (148 ft)
147,0	910	Haseltal viaduct	724 metres (2,375 ft); 714 metres (2,343 ft)	22 metres (72 ft)
149,8	931	Werratal viaduct	1,194 metres (3,917 ft)	34 metres (112 ft)
152,5	948	Eichelberg Tunnel	1,097 metres (3,599 ft); 1,123 metres (3,684 ft)	
153,5	954	Jüchsen viaduct	369 metres (1,211 ft)	25 metres (82 ft)

=== Records ===
- Wilde Gera viaduct: with 252 m (827 ft) span length the largest Arch bridge in Germany, convicted by a street
- Rennsteig Tunnel: with 7,916 metres (25,971 ft) the longest Tunnel in Germany, and the fourth longest Tunnel with two parallel tubes in Europe

== Gallery ==
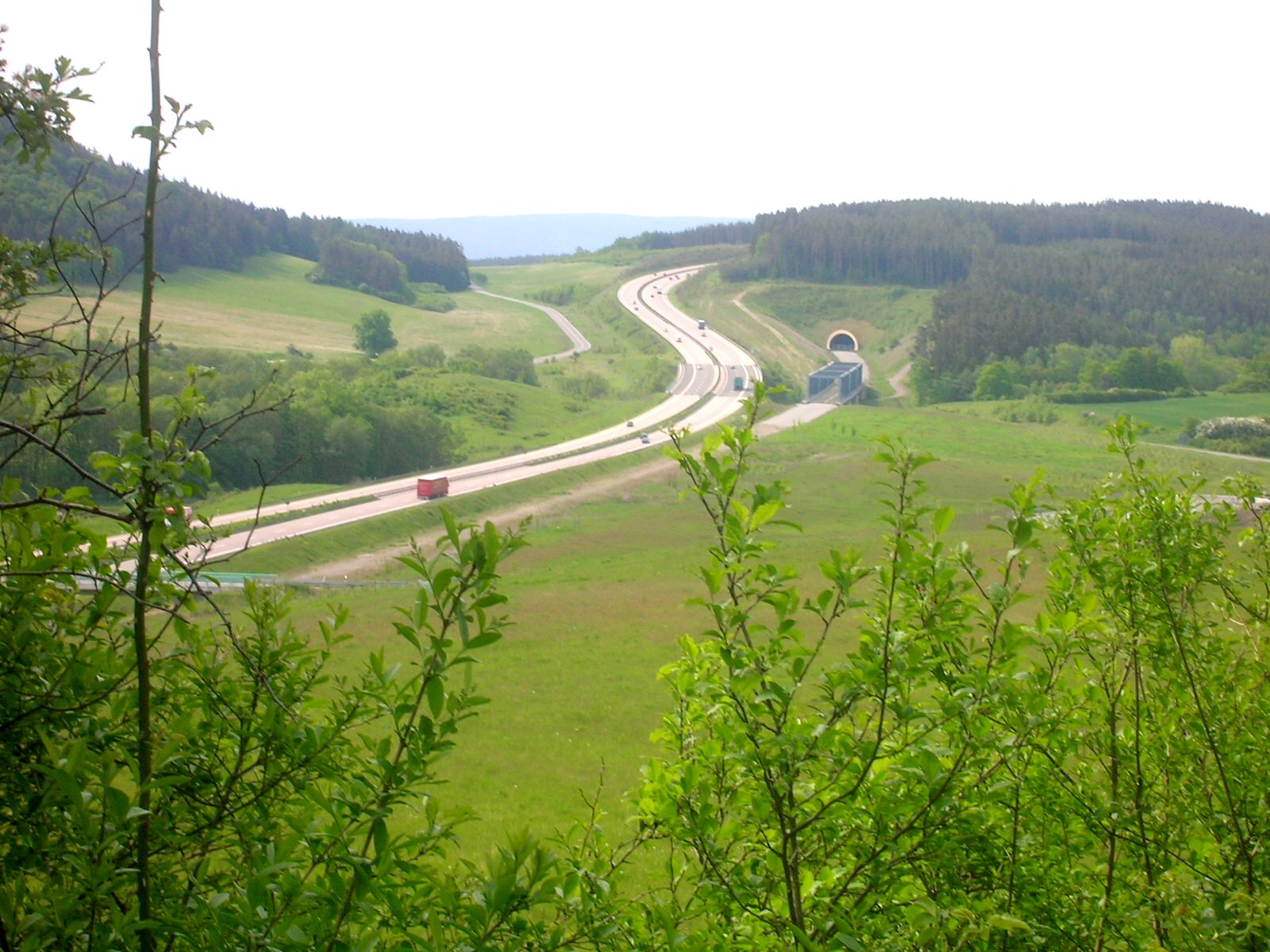
A 71 crossing the Wipfratal, rightwards the Nuremberg–Erfurt high-speed railway and their gate to the Sandberg Tunnel

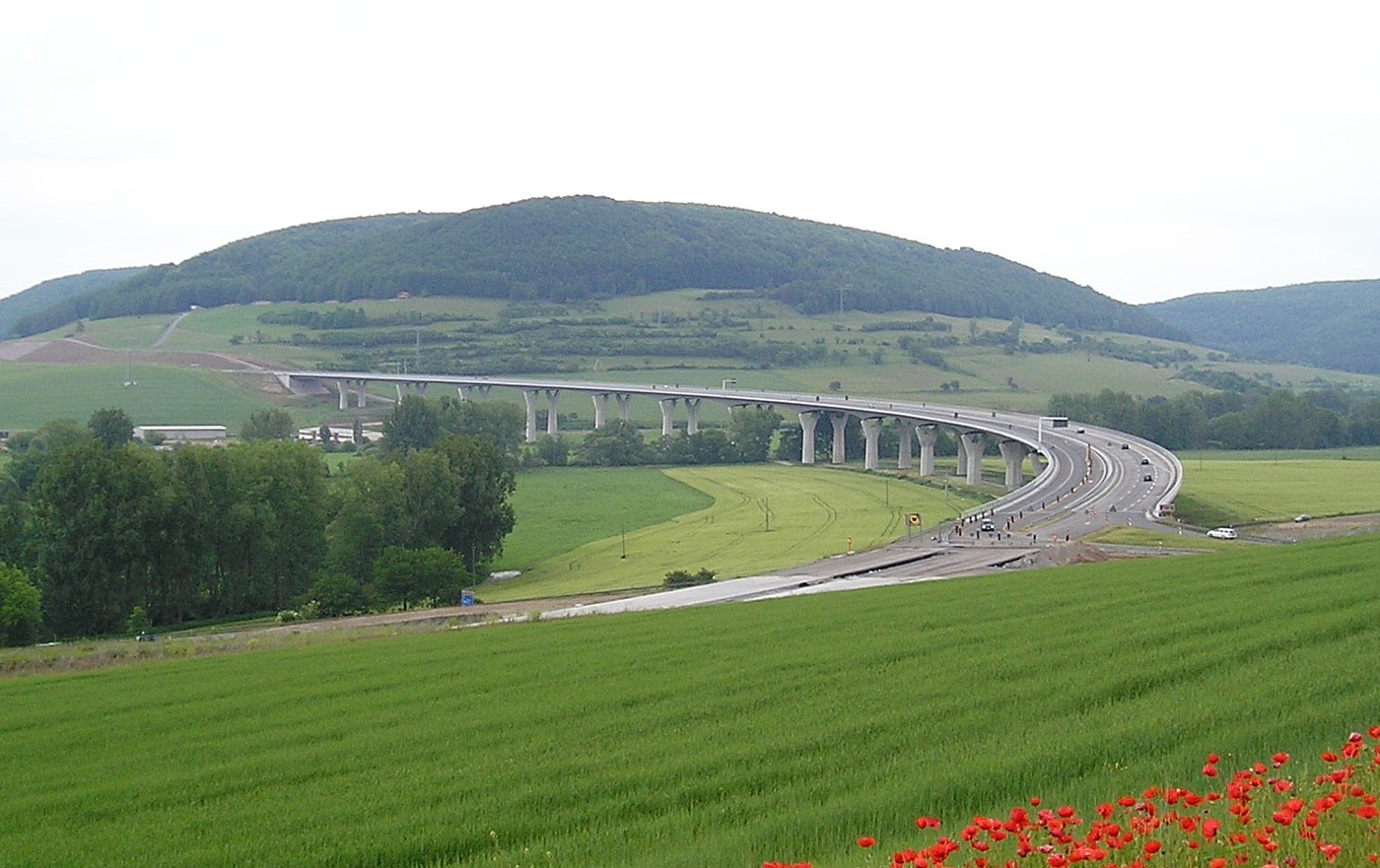
Werratal viaduct near the exit Meiningen-Süd, the longest bridge of the A 71 with a length of 1,194 m (3,917 ft)

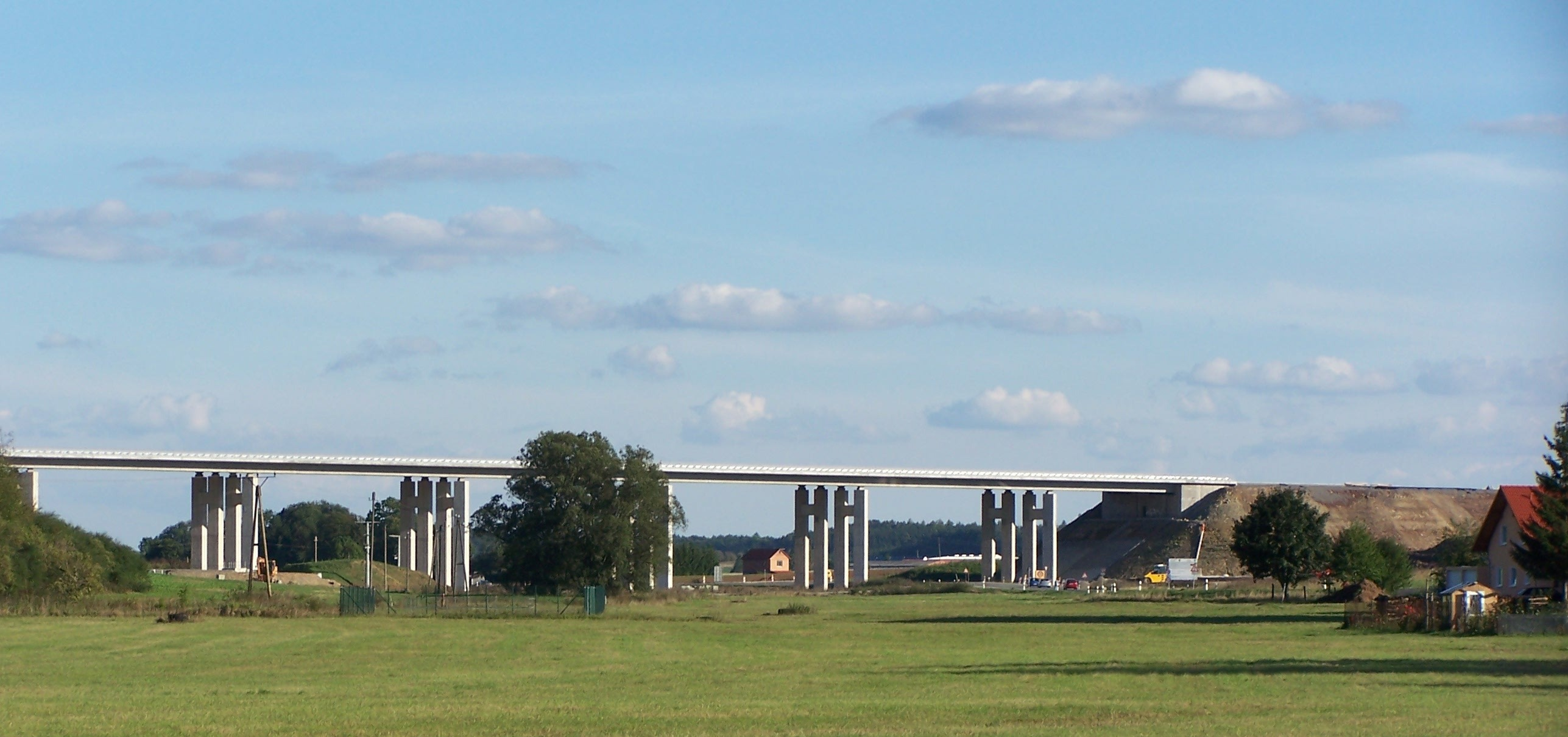
Bibra viaduct between Rentwertshausen and Queienfeld

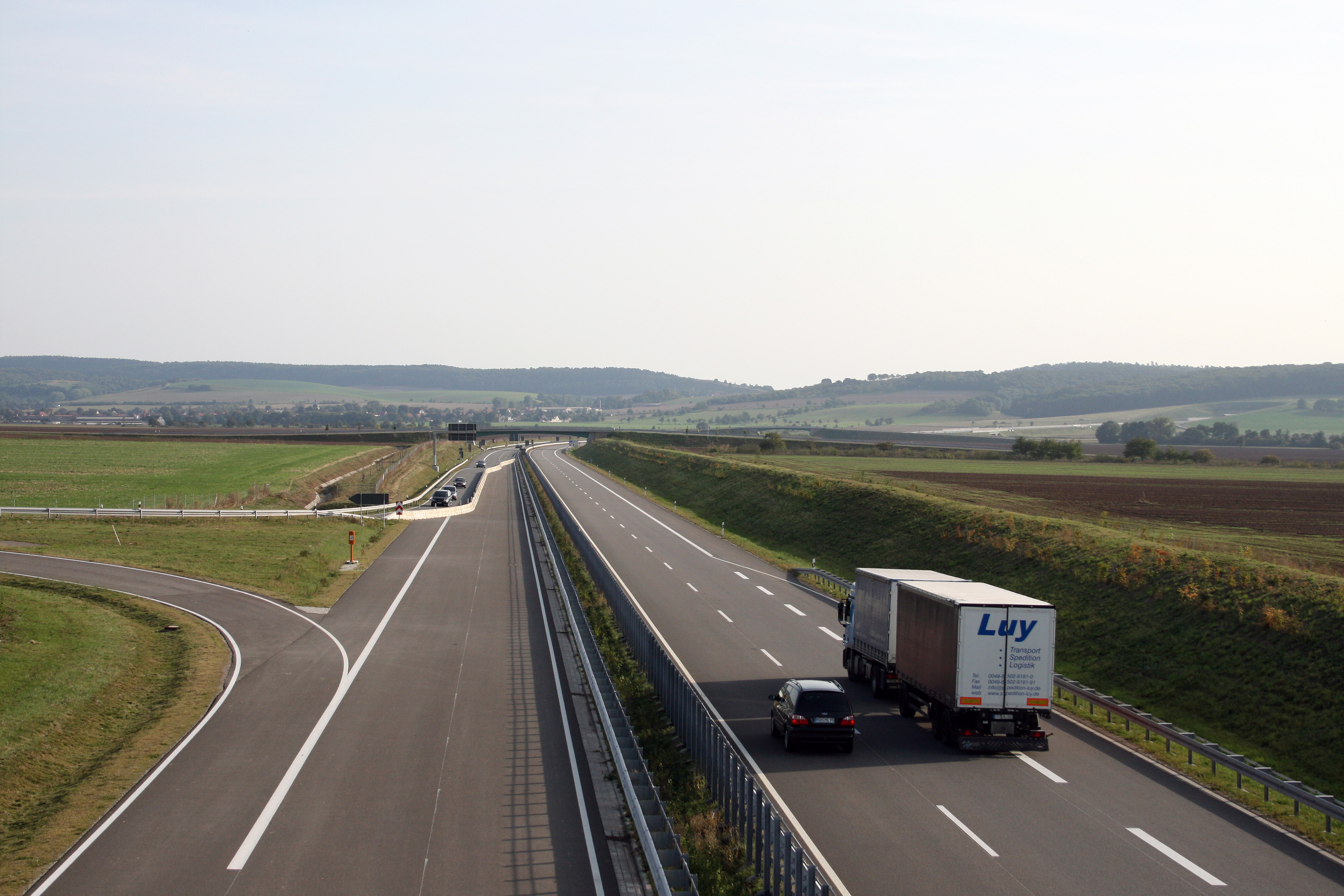
Heldrungen exit in the direction of Tunnel Schmücke; Opened in September 2009
