= Untersiemau =

- Municipality
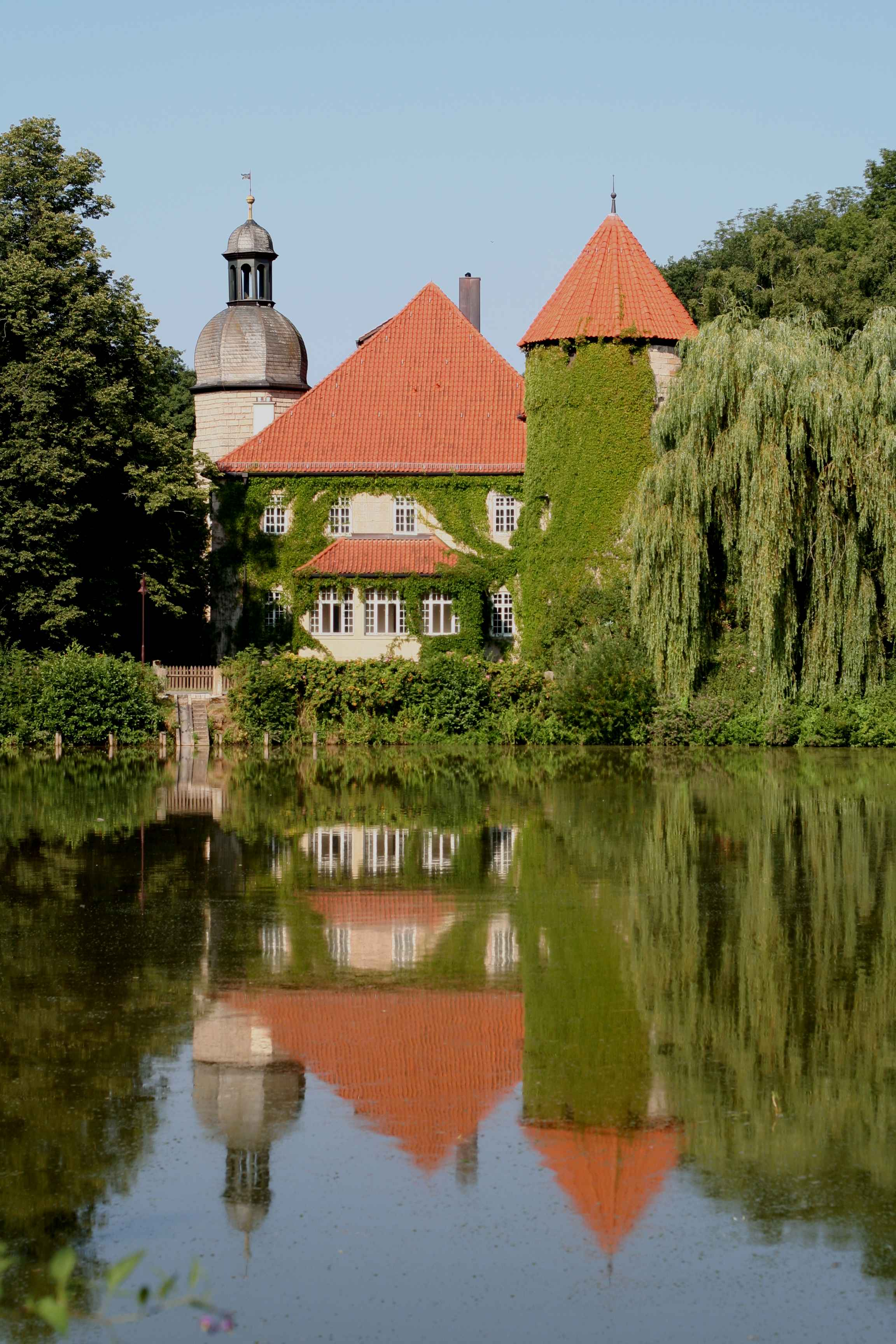
- Castle in the town

- Coat of arms

- Location of Untersiemau within Coburg district
- Interactive map of Untersiemau
- Location within Germany Location within Bavaria
- Coordinates: 50°11′39″N 10°58′23″E
- Country: Germany
- State: Bavaria
- Admin. region: Oberfranken
- District: Coburg

Government
  - Mayor (2020–26): Rolf Rosenbauer (CSU)

Area
  - Total: 20.49 km^{2} (7.91 sq mi)
- Elevation: 299 m (981 ft)

Population (2025-12-31)
  - Total: 4,087
  - Density: 199.5/km^{2} (516.6/sq mi)
- Time zone: UTC+01:00 (CET)
  - Summer (DST): UTC+02:00 (CEST)
- Postal codes: 96253
- Dialling codes: 09565
- Vehicle registration: CO
- Website: www.untersiemau.de

Untersiemau is a municipality in the district of Coburg in Bavaria in Germany.

== Geography ==
=== Location ===
Untersiemau lies about 10 kilometres (6.2 miles) south of Coburg at the eastern edge of Itz Valley.

=== Subdivisions ===
Untersiemau is divided into 9 Ortsteile:

- Birkach am Forst
- Haarth
- Meschenbach
- Obersiemau
- Scherneck
- Stöppach
- Untersiemau
- Weißenbrunn am Forst
- Ziegelsdorf

== History ==
Untersiemau was first mentioned about 800 as Suome, the name is of Slavic origin.

== Transport ==
Untersiemau can be reached by car via motorway A 73 Suhl-Coburg-Nuremberg. Untersiemau used to have a station at the Itz Valley Railway, which was lifted in 2005.
