= Bundesautobahn 67 =

Federal motorway in Germany

A 67
- Bundesautobahn 67
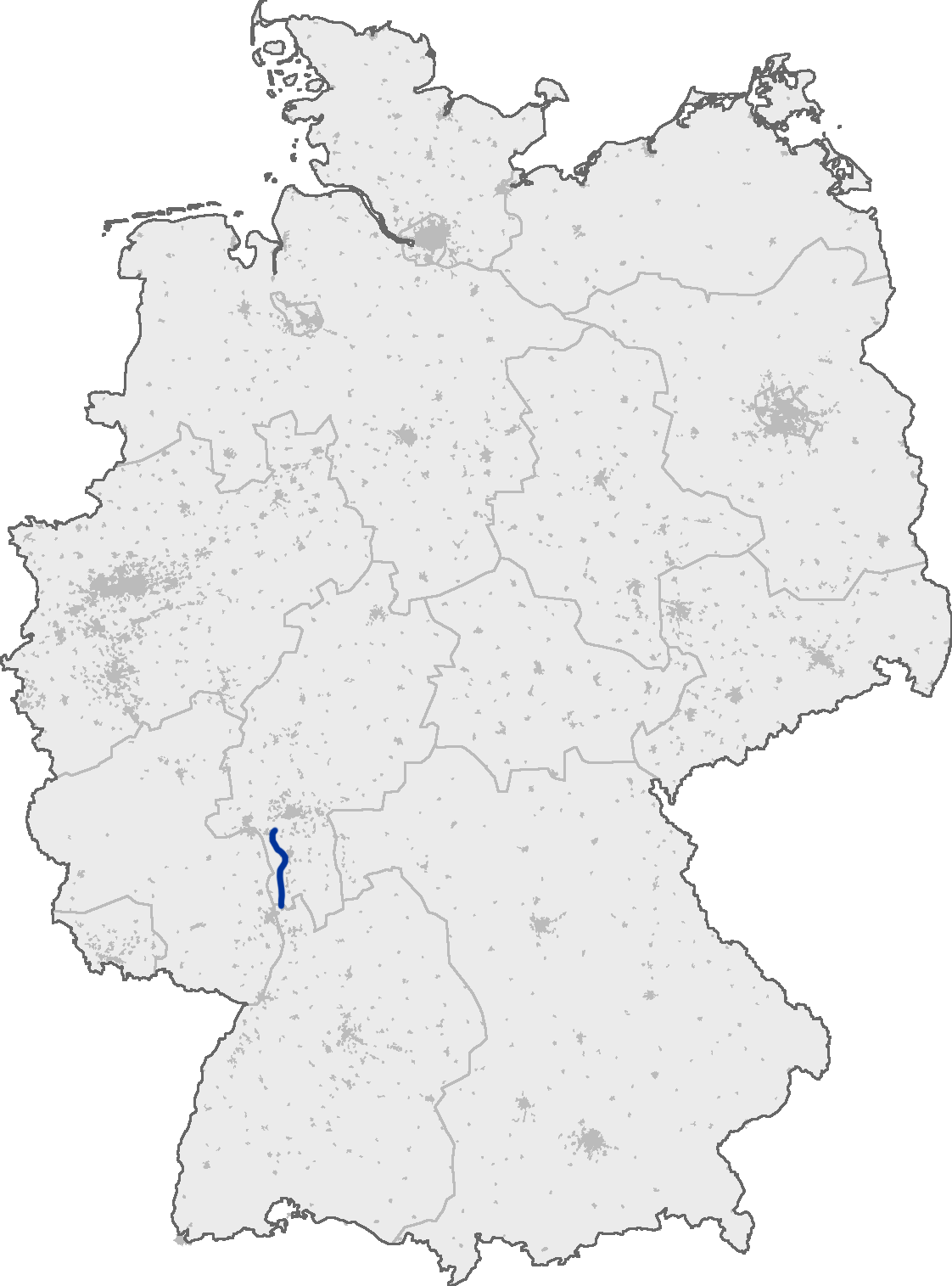

Route information
- Length: 58 km (36 mi)

Major junctions
- North end: Bundesautobahn 3 in Kelsterbach
- South end: Bundesautobahn 6 in Viernheim

Location
- Country: Germany
- States: Hesse

Highway system
- Roads in Germany; Autobahns; List; Federal; List; State; E-roads
← A 66	→ A 70

Bundesautobahn 67 (translates from German as Federal Motorway 67, short form Autobahn 67, abbreviated as BAB 67 or A 67) is an autobahn in Germany. It connects the A3 and A6, passing cities such as Rüsselsheim and Darmstadt.

== Exit lists ==
Legend:

- I/C - Interchange, I/S - Intersection, RSA - Rest and service area, OBR - Overhead bridge restaurant, R/R - Restaurant and rest plaza, L/B - Layby, V/P - Vista point, TN - tunnel, T/P - Toll plaza, BR - Bridge
- C - Cloverleaf, S - Stack, T-A - Trumpet-A, T-B - Trumpet-B, DT - Directional-T/Y, SDT - Semi-Directional-T/Y, P-Y - Partial-Y, D - Diamond, P-C - Partial cloverleaf, D-D - Diverging diamond, D-R - Direct ramp

km	Exit	Name	Destinations	Notes
Intersection	(1)	Mönchhof-Dreieck A 3 E35 E42		
		Rest area Neuhöfer Tann/Hohe Wart		
	(2)	Rüsselsheim-Ost B 486		
Intersection	(3)	Rüsselsheimer Dreieck A 60 E42		
	(4)	Groß-Gerau B 44		
	(5)	Büttelborn B 42 B 44		
		Rest area Büttelborn		
		Tankstelle Büttelborn		
	(6)	Darmstadt/Griesheim 3-way interchange A 672		
	(6)	Darmstädter Kreuz A 5 E35 E451		
		Services / Motel Pfungstadt		
	(7)	Pfungstadt B 426		
	(8)	Gernsheim		
		Jägersburger Wald/Forsthaus parking area		
	(9)	Lorsch B 47		
		Services Lorsch		
		Wildbahn parking area		
Intersection	(10)	Viernheimer Dreieck A 6 E50		
