= Ludwigschorgast =

- Municipality
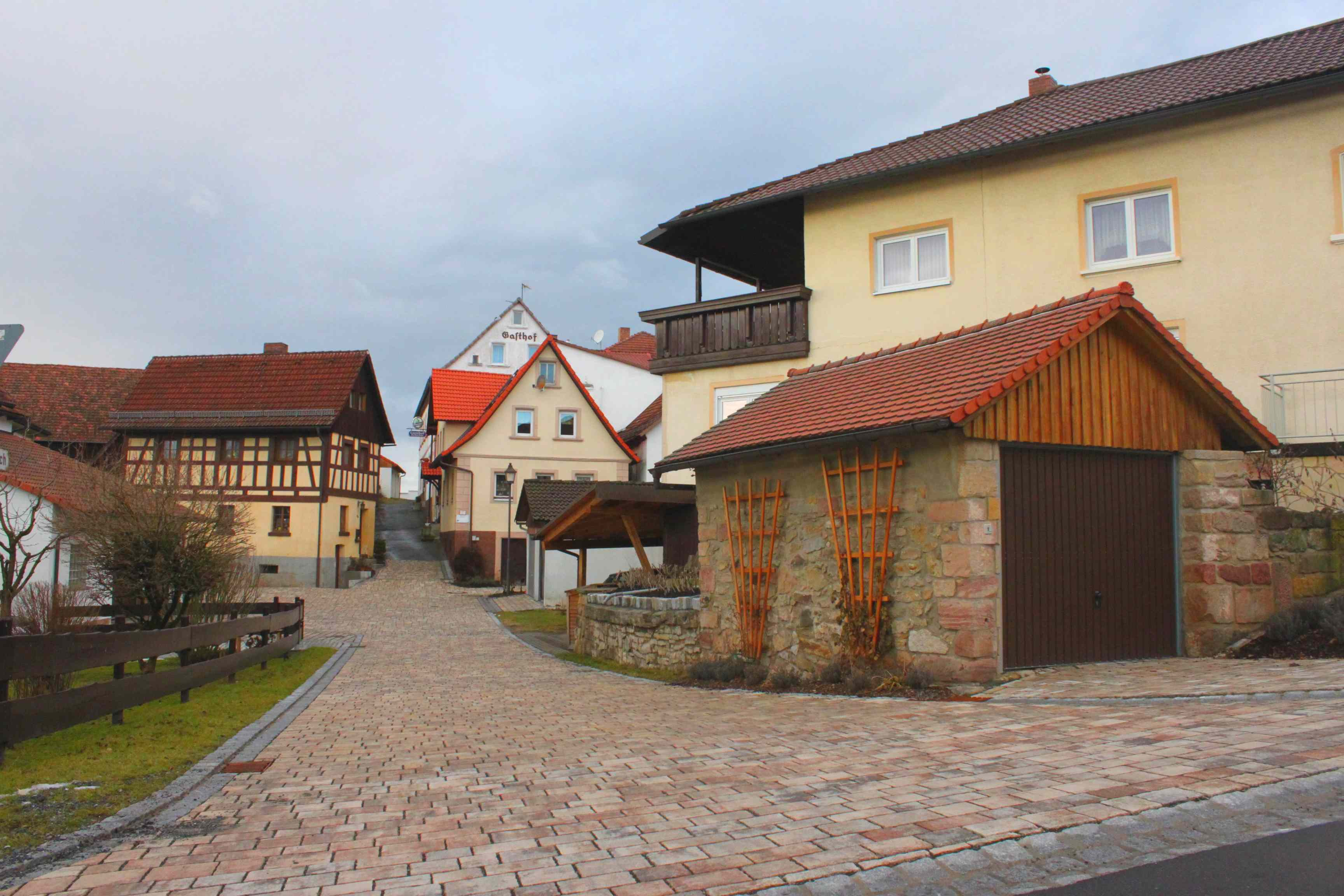
- Center of the village

- Coat of arms

- Location of Ludwigschorgast within Kulmbach district
- Interactive map of Ludwigschorgast
- Location within Germany Location within Bavaria
- Coordinates: 50°7′N 11°34′E
- Country: Germany
- State: Bavaria
- Admin. region: Oberfranken
- District: Kulmbach
- Municipal assoc.: Untersteinach
- Subdivisions: 4 Ortsteile

Government
  - Mayor (2020–26): Doris Leithner-Bisani (CSU)

Area
  - Total: 5.95 km^{2} (2.30 sq mi)
- Elevation: 339 m (1,112 ft)

Population (2025-12-31)
  - Total: 941
  - Density: 158/km^{2} (410/sq mi)
- Time zone: UTC+01:00 (CET)
  - Summer (DST): UTC+02:00 (CEST)
- Postal codes: 95364
- Dialling codes: 09227
- Vehicle registration: KU
- Website: www.ludwigschorgast.de

Ludwigschorgast is a municipality in the district of Kulmbach in Upper Franconia in Bavaria, Germany.

== Municipal parts ==
Ludwigschorgast is arranged in the following boroughs:

- Drahtmühle
- Erlenmühle
- Lindenhof
- Ludwigschorgast
