= Bundesautobahn 73 =

Federal motorway in Germany

A 73
- Bundesautobahn 73

Route information
- Length: 170 km (110 mi)

Major junctions
- North end: Bundesautobahn 71 in Suhl, Thuringia
- South end: Bundesstraße 8 in Nuremberg

Location
- Country: Germany
- States: Thuringia, Bavaria

Highway system
- Roads in Germany; Autobahns; List; Federal; List; State; E-roads
← A 72	→ A 81

Bundesautobahn 73 (translates from German as Federal Motorway 73, short form Autobahn 73, abbreviated as BAB 73 or A 73) is a motorway in Germany. It connects Suhl to Nuremberg. The part between Bamberg and Nuremberg is also known as the Frankenschnellweg. Between exits Nürnberg/Fürth and Nürnberg-Hafen Ost it is not classified as Bundesautobahn. In Nürnberg-Gostenhof it is not an Autobahn and interrupted by crossings with traffic lights.

== Exit list ==
(1)	Suhl 3-way interchange A 71
	Talbrücke Haseltal 845 m
(2)	Suhl-Zentrum
	Talbrücke Wiesental 252 m
	Talbrücke Langer Grund 372 m
(3)	Suhl-Friedberg
	Talbrücke Wallersbachtal 555 m
	Talbrücke Dambachtal 370 m
	Parkplatz parking area
	Talbrücke Leuketal 216 m
	Talbrücke Silbachtal 340 m
	Talbrücke Ochsengrund 188 m
	Talbrücke Feuchter Grund 147 m
	Talbrücke St. Kilian 449 m
(4)	Schleusingen
	Talbrücke Nahe 435 m
	Talbrücke Schleuse 680 m
	Talbrücke Wiedersbach 177,5 m
	Talbrücke Brünn 696 m
	Talbrücke Sulzebach 268 m
	Talbrücke Weißa 236,5 m
(5)	Eisfeld-Nord
	Rest area
	Talbrücke Werratal 432 m
(6)	Eisfeld-Süd
	Rest area Coburger Land 2015 (planned)
	Lauter Viaduct 300 m
(7)	Coburg-Nord B 4
(8)	Neustadt/Sonneberg B 4
(9)	Rödental
	Itztalbrücke 850 m
	Rest area
	Füllbachtalbrücke 161 m
(10)	Ebersdorf B 303
	Talbrücke Nestelgraben 302 m
(11)	Coburg-Süd B 289n
(12)	Lichtenfels-Nord
	Maintalbrücke 657 m
(13)	Lichtenfels 3-way interchange B 173
	Talbrücke Maintal 657 m
(14)	Bad Staffelstein-Kurzentrum
	parking area
(15)	Bad Staffelstein
(16)	Ebensfeld
	Talbrücke Leiterbach 315 m
	parking area
	Talbrücke Mühlbach 150 m
(17)	Zapfendorf
	Talbrücke 130 m
	100 m
(18)	Breitengüßbach-Nord
(19)	Breitengüßbach-Mitte
(20)	Breitengüßbach-Süd
	100 m
	Rest area
(21)	Bamberg 4-way interchange A 70
(22)	Memmelsdorf
	Warner Barracks, U.S. military traffic only
(23)	Bamberg-Ost
(24)	Bamberg-Süd B 22 B 505
(25)	Hirschaid
(26)	Buttenheim
	Rest area
	Rest area Regnitztal (planned)
(27)	Forchheim-Nord
	Wiesentbrücke 120 m
(28)	Forchheim-Süd B 470
(29)	Baiersdorf-Nord
(30)	Möhrendorf
	parking area
(31)	Erlangen-Nord
(32)	Erlangen
(33)	Erlangen-Bruck B 4
(34)	Fürth/Erlangen 4-way interchange A 3
(35)	Eltersdorf
	parking area
(36)	Fürth-Steinach
(37)	Fürth-Ronhof
(38)	Fürth-Poppenreuth
(39)	Nürnberg/Fürth B 8
	↓ Change to Kreisstraße N 4, mautfrei
	Nürnberg-Westring
	Gostenhof
	Tunnel (planned)
	Nürnberg-Südring
	Kreuz Nürnberg-Hafen 4-way interchange Südwesttangente
	↓ Change to Gemeindestraße „Südwesttangente“
(43)	Nürnberg-Hafen-Ost
	↓ Change back to A 73
(44)	Nürnberg-Hafen-Süd former Nürnberg-Königshof
(45)	Nürnberg-Zollhaus B 8
(46)	Nürnberg-Süd 4-way interchange A 6
(47)	Röthenbach bei Sankt Wolfgang
(48)	Feucht B 8
(49)	Nürnberg/Feucht 3-way interchange A 9
