= Bergrheinfeld =

- Municipality
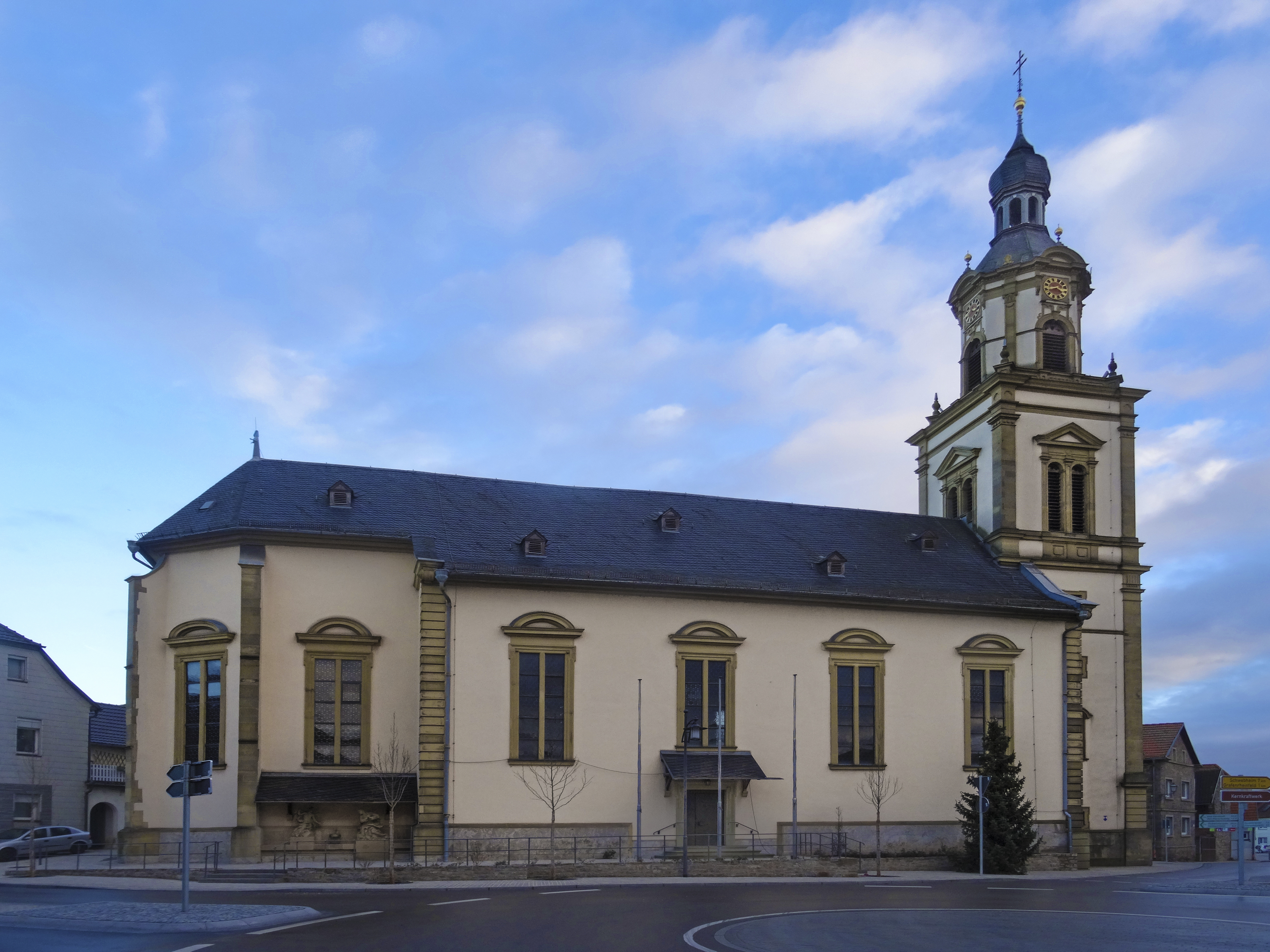
- Church of Our Lady of Sorrows

- Coat of arms

- Location of Bergrheinfeld within Schweinfurt district
- Interactive map of Bergrheinfeld
- Location within Germany Location within Bavaria
- Coordinates: 50°0′N 10°10′E
- Country: Germany
- State: Bavaria
- Admin. region: Unterfranken
- District: Schweinfurt
- Subdivisions: 2 Ortsteile

Government
  - Mayor (2023–29): Ulrich Werner (CSU)

Area
  - Total: 19.87 km^{2} (7.67 sq mi)
- Elevation: 208 m (682 ft)

Population (2025-12-31)
  - Total: 5,208
  - Density: 262.1/km^{2} (678.8/sq mi)
- Time zone: UTC+01:00 (CET)
  - Summer (DST): UTC+02:00 (CEST)
- Postal codes: 97493
- Dialling codes: 09721, 09722
- Vehicle registration: SW
- Website: www.bergrheinfeld.de

Bergrheinfeld is a municipality in the district of Schweinfurt in Bavaria, Germany.

== Economy ==
Boll KG is headquartered in Bergreinfeld.
