= Bundesstraße 4 =

Federal highway in Germany

B 4
- Bundesstraße 4

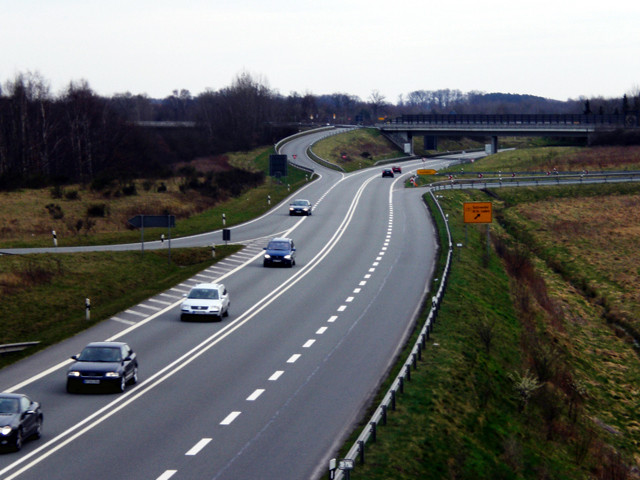

Route information
- Length: 610 km (380 mi)

Location
- Country: Germany
- States: Schleswig-Holstein, Hamburg, Lower Saxony, Thuringia, Bavaria

Highway system
- Roads in Germany; Autobahns; List; Federal; List; State; E-roads

The Bundesstraße 4 (abbr. B4) is a German federal highway running in a northwesterly to southerly direction from the state of Schleswig-Holstein to Bavaria. It provides a direct route for motorists traveling between Hamburg and Nuremberg.

The section north of Hamburg is paralleled by Bundesautobahn 7 and the road is down-graded to a Landstraße (country road); the section between Hallstadt and Erlangen is paralleled by the A 70 and A 73 and is also down-graded to a Staatsstraße (state road, same as country road). In 2024, a section in Erlangen between Tennenlohe and Bruck will be downgraded to a Kreisstraße (district road) in the future as part of a plan to build an urban railway and a cycle path.

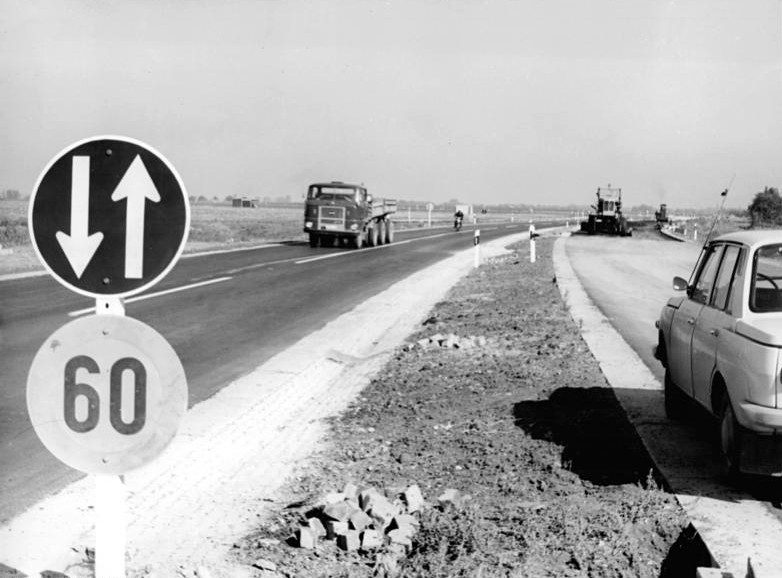
Building of the Fernverkehrsstraße 4 (long distance road) near Erfurt in 1971.

The Bundesstraße 4 is the former Reichsstraße 4 (imperial road), on which north of Quickborn the last Commanding Admiral of the Kriegsmarine Friedeburg met with officers of the 2nd British Army to negotiate a truce with the Western Allied forces on 4 May 1945.

== See also ==
- Transport in Hamburg
