= Untersteinach =

- Municipality
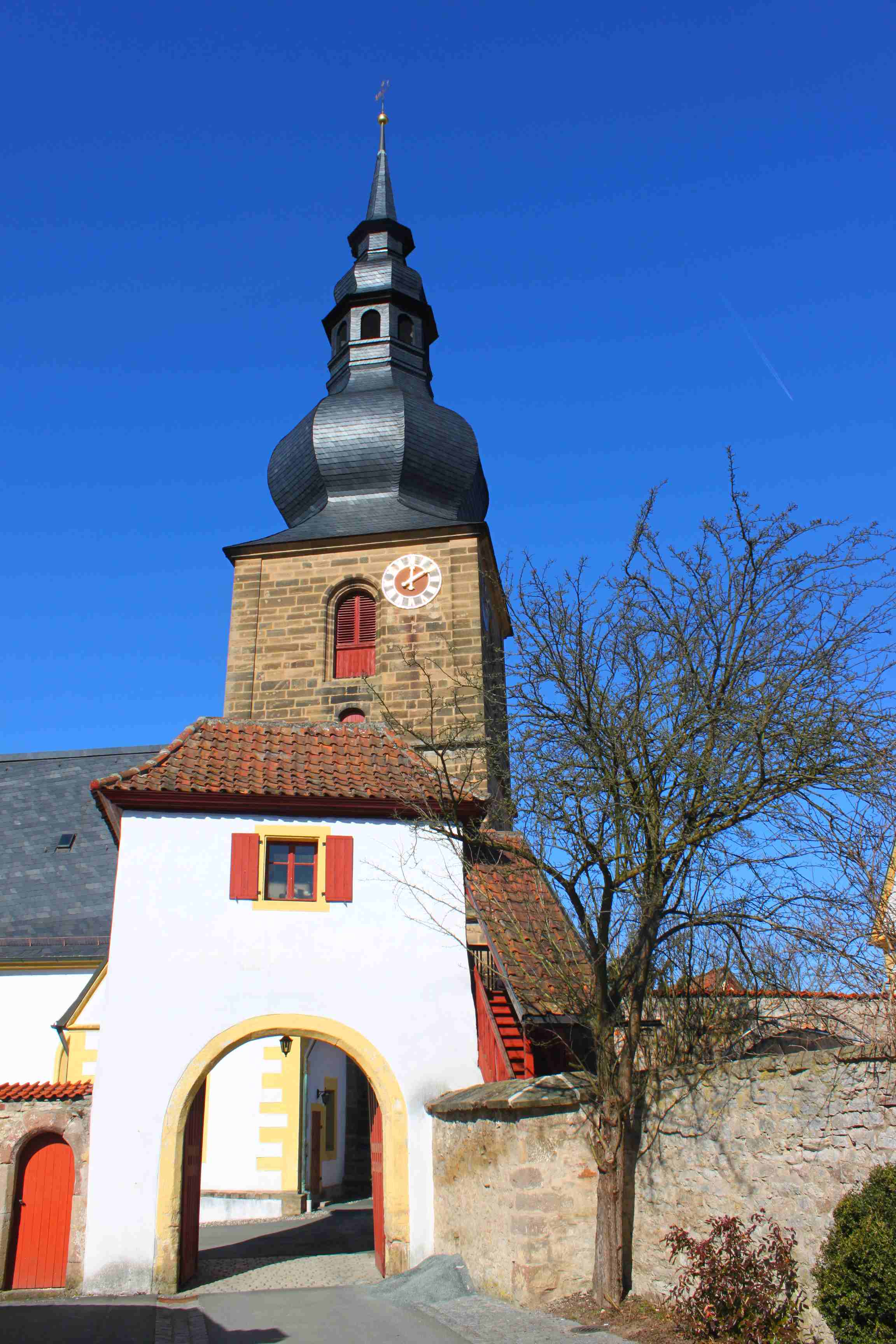
- Church of Saint Oswald

- Coat of arms

- Location of Untersteinach within Kulmbach district
- Interactive map of Untersteinach
- Location within Germany Location within Bavaria
- Coordinates: 50°7′N 11°31′E
- Country: Germany
- State: Bavaria
- Admin. region: Oberfranken
- District: Kulmbach
- Municipal assoc.: Untersteinach
- Subdivisions: 3 Ortsteile

Government
  - Mayor (2020–26): Volker Schmiechen (SPD)

Area
  - Total: 11.42 km^{2} (4.41 sq mi)
- Elevation: 333 m (1,093 ft)

Population (2025-12-31)
  - Total: 1,721
  - Density: 150.7/km^{2} (390.3/sq mi)
- Time zone: UTC+01:00 (CET)
  - Summer (DST): UTC+02:00 (CEST)
- Postal codes: 95369
- Dialling codes: 09225
- Vehicle registration: KU
- Website: www.untersteinach.de

Untersteinach is a municipality in the district of Kulmbach in Bavaria in Germany.

== History ==
The History of the Municipality is filled with large gaps due to a fire in the town, which caused almost all records to be burnt.

"Nydernsteinach" was first mentioned in a document in 1281.

The Schlüsselberg brothers Eberhard IV and Ultich III held the village of "Nydernsteinach" as a fief of Bamberg and granted it to Eberhard and Heinrich von Plassenberg. The Burgraves received half of the village in 1386. Despite the bishop's objections, Untersteinach remained under the territorial jurisdiction of the Margravial Office of Kulmbach. In later years, the imperial nobles of the House of Varell ruled in Untersteinach. The last nobleman of the House of Varell was Imperial Baron Georg Adam, Lord of Untersteinach, Guttenberg, Burghaig, and Mayerhof, Lieutenant General and Colonel-in-Chief of His Imperial Majesty, who died in 1765 at his castle in Untersteinach (the site of which now houses the administrative building of the local authority), thus ending the proud line of imperial nobility. Untersteinach had already adopted the Lutheran doctrine around 1553.

Due to the old military road running through the village, Untersteinach experienced much hardship and many afflictions. The Thirty Years' War was particularly terrible. Reports speak of severe mistreatment of the population. The village and the castle suffered fire damage. Another devastating fire occurred on August 10, 1706. On that day, almost the entire village fell victim to a massive blaze, which caused the church and the documents inside to be destroyed, which is why almost all information about the village come from surrounding areas.

In 1969 Hans Leins was the 51-year-old Burgomaster of Untersteinach. That year he recalled his daring 1944 escape from the German POW camp in Sutton Park, near Birmingham. Leins worked in a factory, where he obtained a raincoat from a fellow worker and escaped by crawling under the barbed wire. The coat enabled him to disguise the camp uniform with its large POW label in big white letters and he was able to walk undetected 'eight to ten miles' before reaching Villa Park. There Leins watched the Saturday match before walking back and crawling under the wire back into captivity. Leins repeated his escapade every other Saturday. His identity was soon discovered by the Aston Villa crowd and he recalled them waiting for him each Saturday with gifts of cigarettes and apples. World War II ended in Untersteinach in April 1945 with the occupation of the town by the 11th US Armored Division.

After World War II, many Catholic refugees came to Untersteinach. In the early postwar years, Catholic services were held in the Protestant parish church of St. Oswald. The Catholic Church of the Visitation of Mary was built in 1957/58 and solemnly consecrated on July 20, 1958.

== City arrangement ==
Untersteinach is arranged in the following boroughs:

- Gumpersdorf
- Hummendorf
- Untersteinach

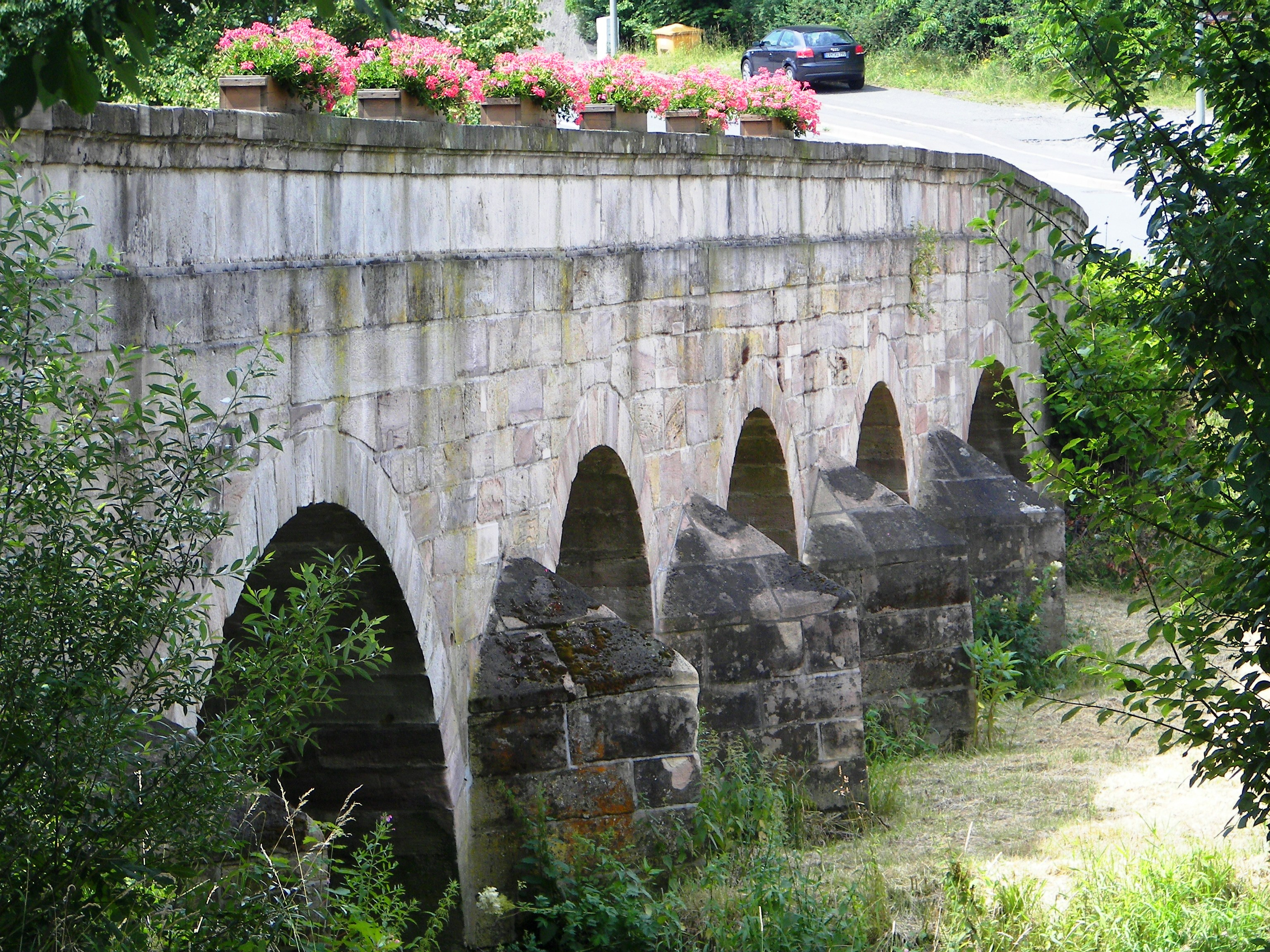
Old stone bridge over the Untere Steinach river
