= Bundesautobahn 99 =

Federal motorway in Germany

Coordinates: 48.0903°N 11.745°E

A 99
- Bundesautobahn 99
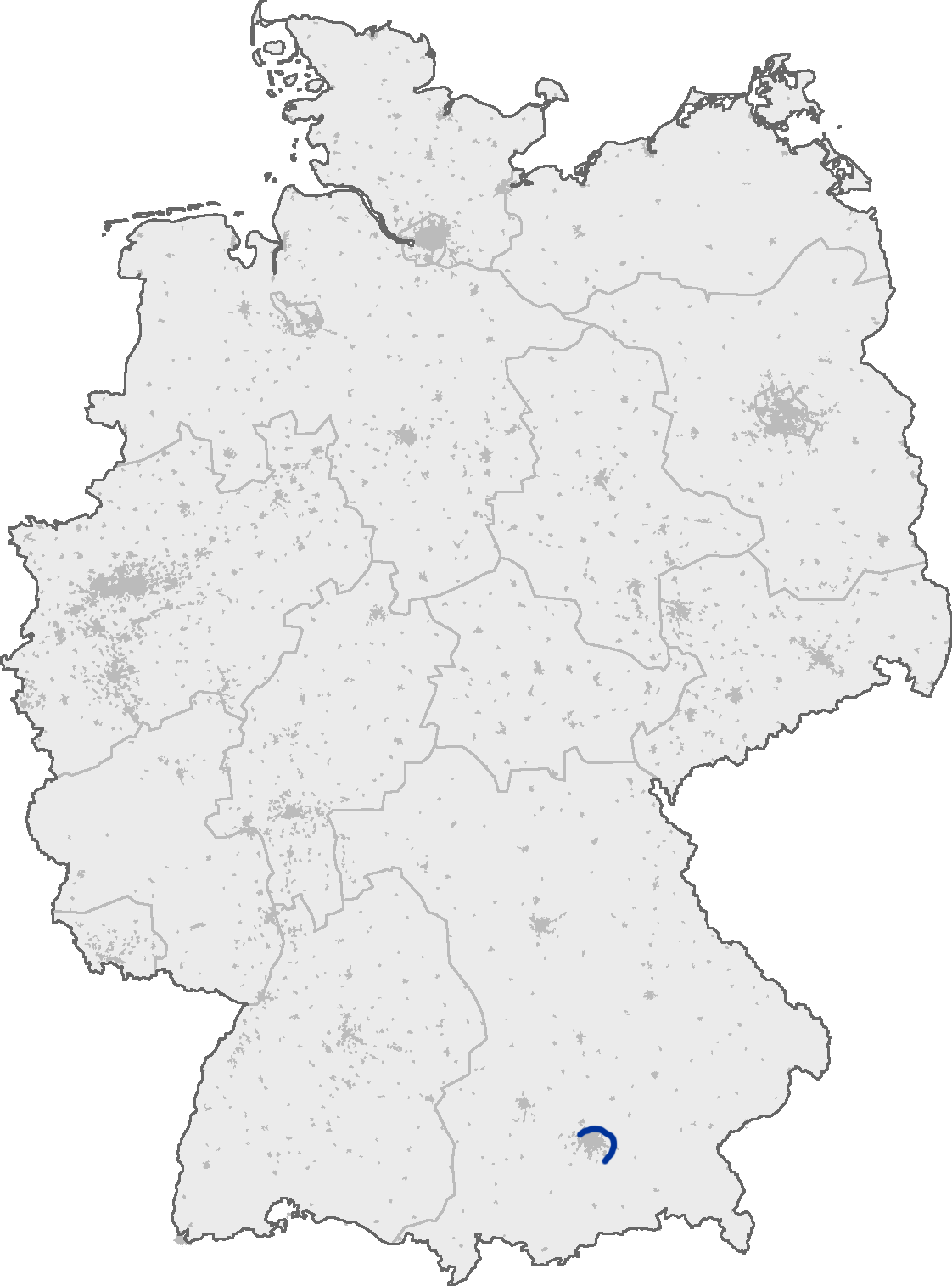

Route information
- Length: 53.5 km (33.2 mi)

Location
- Country: Germany
- States: Bavaria

Highway system
- Roads in Germany; Autobahns; List; Federal; List; State; E-roads
| ← A 98 | → A 100 |

Bundesautobahn 99 (translates from German as Federal Motorway 99, short form Autobahn 99, abbreviated as BAB 99 or A 99) is an autobahn in southern Germany. It is the Munich outer ring road.

== History ==
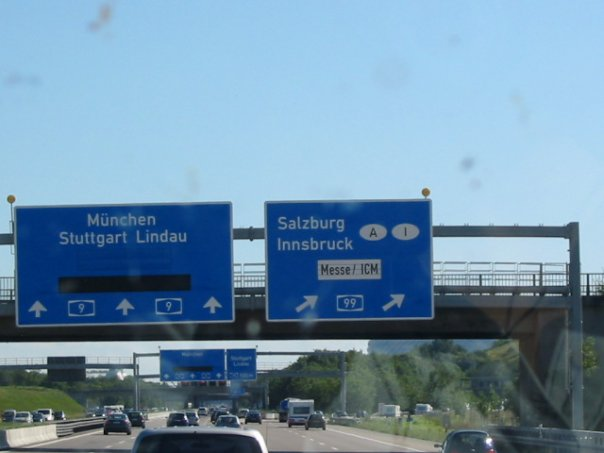

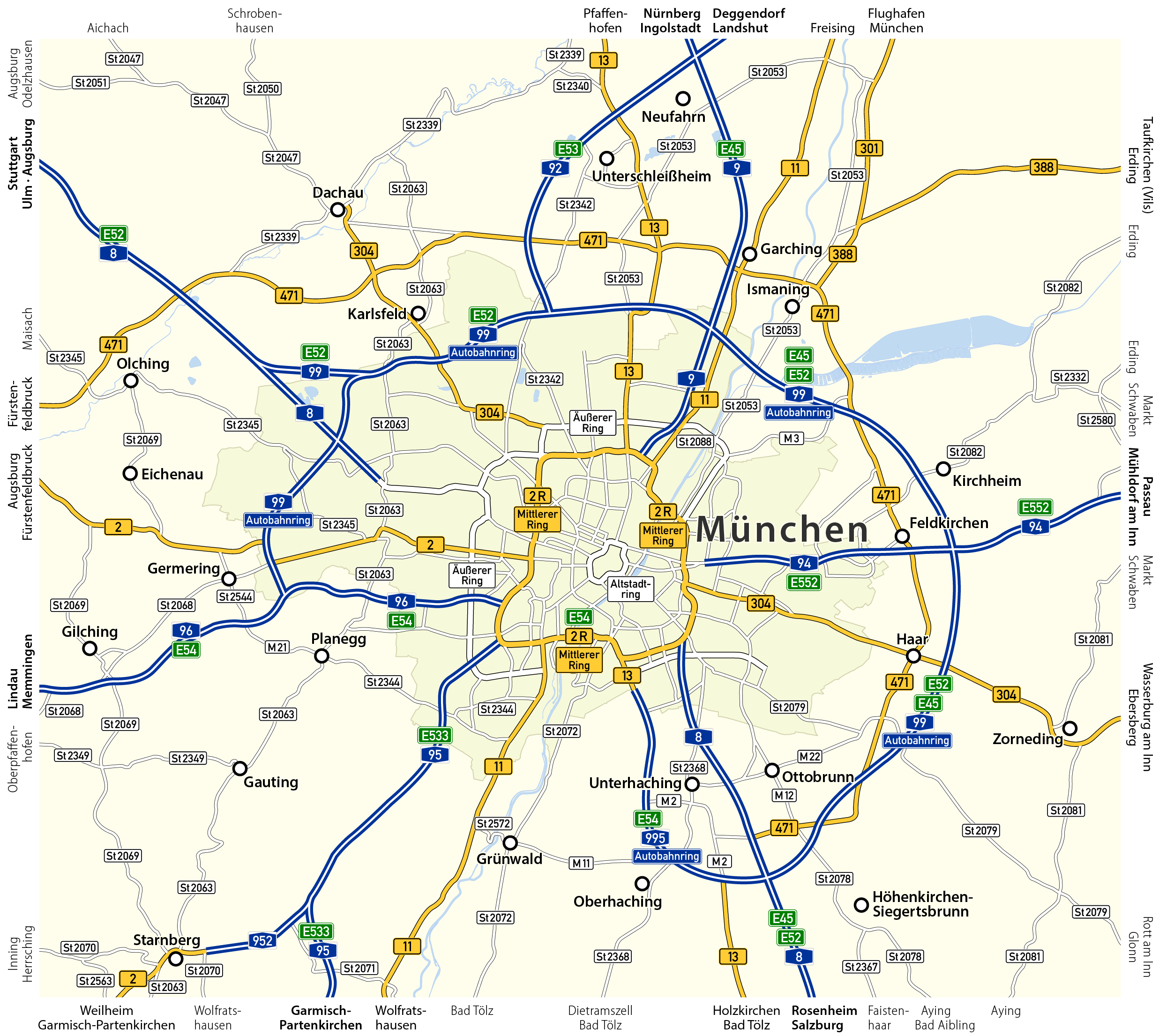
detailed map

Due to the Second World War, the construction was begun only in places, the clearest evidence of the construction activity at that time is the Allach-Untermenzinger route clearly visible on aerial photographs, together with remains of the route for the cross with the BAB 8; a never-used bridge at the site was demolished in the mid-1990s. Furthermore, there are cleared forest sections north of the Hasenbergl.

After the war, first the section between the cross Munich north and the cross Munich south (old designation: cross Brunnthal) was built in the 1970s. The A 8 Munich-Stuttgart was provisionally connected via the federal highway 471 to the A 9. Until then, the long-distance traffic had to drive through the urban area of Munich.

The junction München-Fröttmaning-Nord was subsequently built to accommodate the additional traffic of the Allianz Arena from and to Stuttgart. It is only designed as a half connection point. The exit Aschheim / Ismaning was also subsequently - a few years after completion of the section between A 9 (Munich-Nuremberg) and A 8 (Munich-Salzburg) - built to relieve the community Aschheim from through traffic. However, this has only partially succeeded.

A ring closure in the south of the A 96 to the A 95 and further to the cross Munich-South (or to the A 995 at Unterhaching) was added in 2003 by the federal government in the Federal Transport Infrastructure as a project in further demand with high ecological risk. In October 2004, a deletion of the project from the Federal Transport Infrastructure Plan was decided. Nevertheless, in May 2006, a feasibility study was commissioned. Their estimated costs of around half a million euros were shared by the Federation and the Free State of Bavaria.

On 18 February 2006 a continuation from Munich-Lochhausen to the Germering-Nord junction was put into operation with a ceremony, and opened to public traffic from 19 February 2006, after another section to the A96 at the interchange München-Südwest already went into operation at the end of November 2005. This is where the A 99 ends today.

On 26 November 2008 the Autobahndirektion Südbayern presented interim results of the study. A second interim report followed on 29 April 2009. Of the originally considered 95 route variants, only eleven are left. The lengths of the routes vary between 13 and 35 kilometers. The southernmost route variant runs south of Gauting, Baierbrunn and Oberhaching. Since large parts of it would have to be built underground, the construction costs would add up to 45 million euros per kilometer. Conventionally built motorway kilometers cost about eight million Euros.

The final step of the feasibility study was to examine what impact the proposed routes would have on the environment, space structure, transport and construction costs. On 17 May 2010 the Autobahndirektion Südbayern presented the final report of the study. The presentation of the report comes to the conclusion that "taking into account the measures for the prevention and reduction of interventions, the closing of the gap in the motorway ring is basically meaningful and feasible". The final report will provide a planning recommendation for two of the original routes studied. Both routes connect the motorway junction Munich-Southwest with different sections of the A 995 in Unterhaching or Taufkirchen. Both routes provide for the tunneling of the village Krailling with the Würmtal. Depending on the route, a tunneling of the Isar valley is planned together with Grünwald and Pullach or a tunnel further to the north. Both routes are estimated to cost €1.2 billion.

The continuation of the A 99 is politically controversial. On 15 June 2010 the Bavarian Prime Minister, Horst Seehofer, stopped the project.

The A99 will be extended between the interchange between Munich-North and Aschheim / Ismaning in the years 2017 to 2019. For this purpose, preparations for provisional traffic management have already started in 2016. During the construction, six lanes will be available. However, the activation of the page strip will not be possible. It will come to major traffic obstructions.

The A 99 was originally built six-lane. It now has four lanes per direction of travel between exit 12a (München-Neuherberg) and Kreuz München-Nord. During peak hours, drivers may also drive on the hard shoulder on the normally six-lane section between Kreuz München-Nord and Kreuz München-Süd. The highway should also be expanded eight-lane between cross Munich-north and junction Haar. The section is divided into three planning sections. For the first section between AK München-Nord and AS Aschheim / Ismaning, the plan approval decision was issued on 14 January 2013. It costs 147 million Euros (237,214,837.42 SGD) to build the road.

== Features ==
The Aubinger Tunnel is Bavaria's longest motorway tunnel with its 1956 metres. It has been honoured by the ADAC as one of the safest tunnels. The tunnel also has one of the most modern speed control systems in Europe. The measurements have been made in both directions since the beginning of March 2008, without the drivers noticing. 500 meters after each entrance, measuring points are set up, which forward the measured data directly to the police. In the first week after its launch, more than 1,500 speeding violations have been registered, according to press releases.

Between the junctions Hohenbrunn and Haar there is a truck control centre of the police and the Federal Office for Freight Traffic in the direction of Nuremberg / Stuttgart. Already in front of the control point, the axle loads of trucks are measured by means of sensors in the lane of the motorway to check the permissible total weight of trucks. Conspicuous trucks are then waved out at the checkpoint; There is a calibrated scale with which the exact weight can be determined.

== Exit list ==
| Intersection | | 3-way interchange Oberhaching (planned) A 995 E54 |
| | | Grünwald (planned) |
| | | Tunnel Isartunnel (planned) |
| | | Pullach (planned) B 11 |
| | | Kreuz Forstenrieder Park (planned) A 95 E533 |
| | | Gauting (planned) |
| | | Tunnel Würmtunnel (planned) |
| | (4) | München-Südwest 3-way interchange A 96 |
| | (5) | München-Freiham-Mitte B 2 |
| | (6) | Germering-Nord B 2 |
| | | Tunnel Aubing 1935 m |
| | (7) | München-Lochhausen |
| | (8) | München-West 4-way interchange A 8 |
| | (9) | München-Allach 3-way interchange A 99a E52 |
| | | Tunnel Allach 1100 m |
| | (10) | München-Ludwigsteld B 304 |
| | (11) | München-Feldmoching 3-way interchange A 92 E53 |
| | | Neuherberg parking area |
| | (12a) | Oberschleißheim-Neuherberg B 13 |
| | (12b) | München-Fröttmaning-Nord |
| | (13) | München-Nord 4-way interchange A 9 E45 |
| | | Isarbrücke 360 m |
| | | Isarkanalbrücke 70 m |
| | (-) | provisional connection |
| | (14) | Aschheim/Ismaning B 471 |
| | | Ascheim parking area |
| | (15) | Kircheim bei München |
| | (16) | München-Ost 4-way interchange A 94 E552 |
| | | Services Vaterstetten |
| | (17) | Haar B 304 |
| | | Putzbrunn parking area |
| | (18) | Hohenbrunn B 471 |
| | (19) | Ottobrunn |
| | (20) | München-Süd 4-way interchange A 8 A 995 E54 B 13 |

== Eschenrieder Spange ==
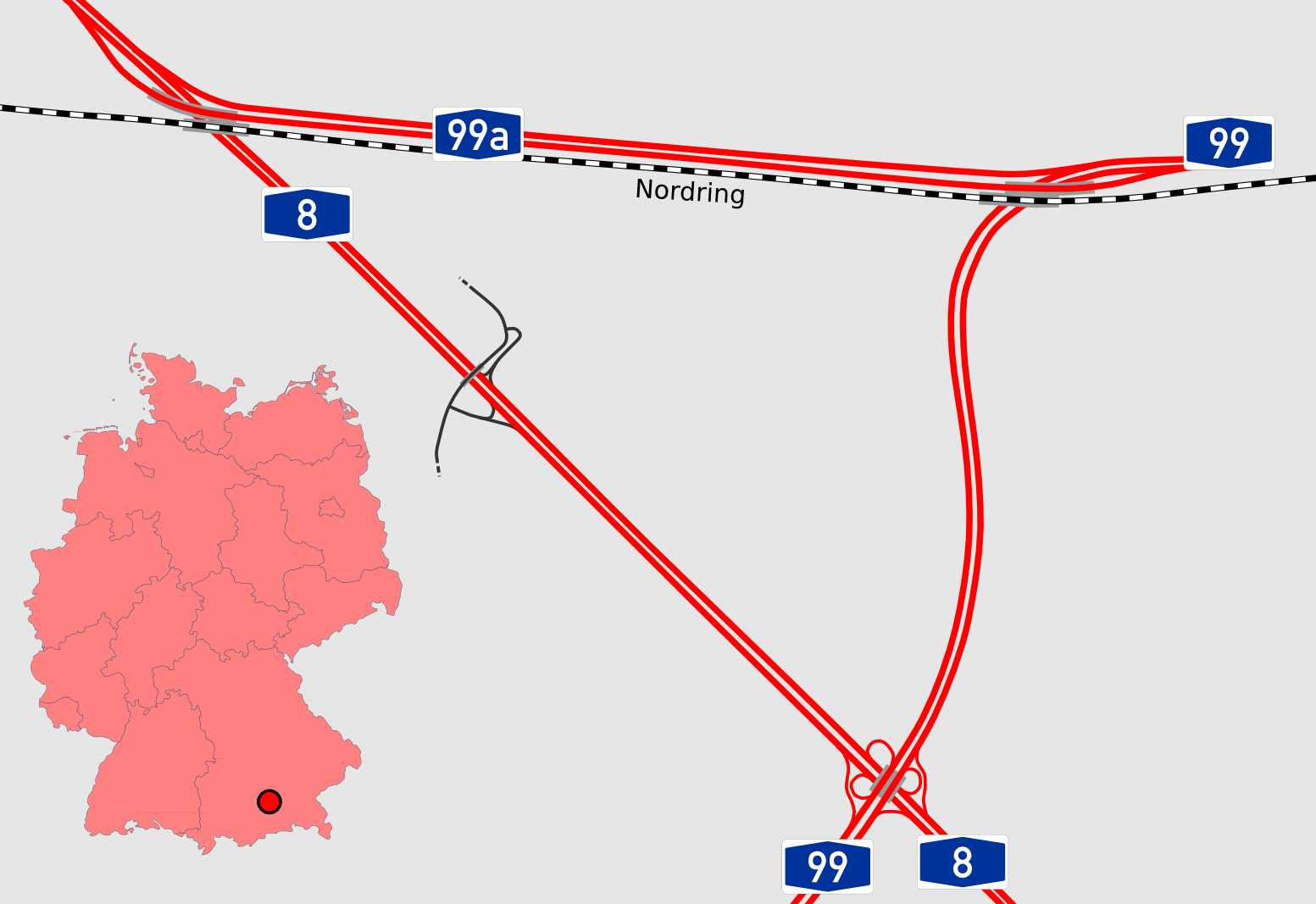

The Eschenrieder Spange (often also called A 99a) is the connecting piece between the 3-way Interchanges Munich-Allach and Munich-Eschenried. Officially, this piece of highway lacks a number and belongs to the Federal Highway 99.

The Eschenrieder Spange was completed in 1998 and serves as a shortcut between the A 8 from Augsburg and the A 99, completely avoiding the Munich-West Interchange, the actual interchange between the two highways. The interchanges between the A 99a and the A 8 and A 99 only have slip roads towards Stuttgart, Augsburg and Munich-North with the other directions having to use the Munich-West Interchange.

Until 2012 the Eschenrieder Spange was the only option to change between the two highways in the mentioned directions when the Munich-West Interchange was expanded with new slip roads as an alternative to the Eschenrieder Spange.
