= Oberhaching =

- Municipality
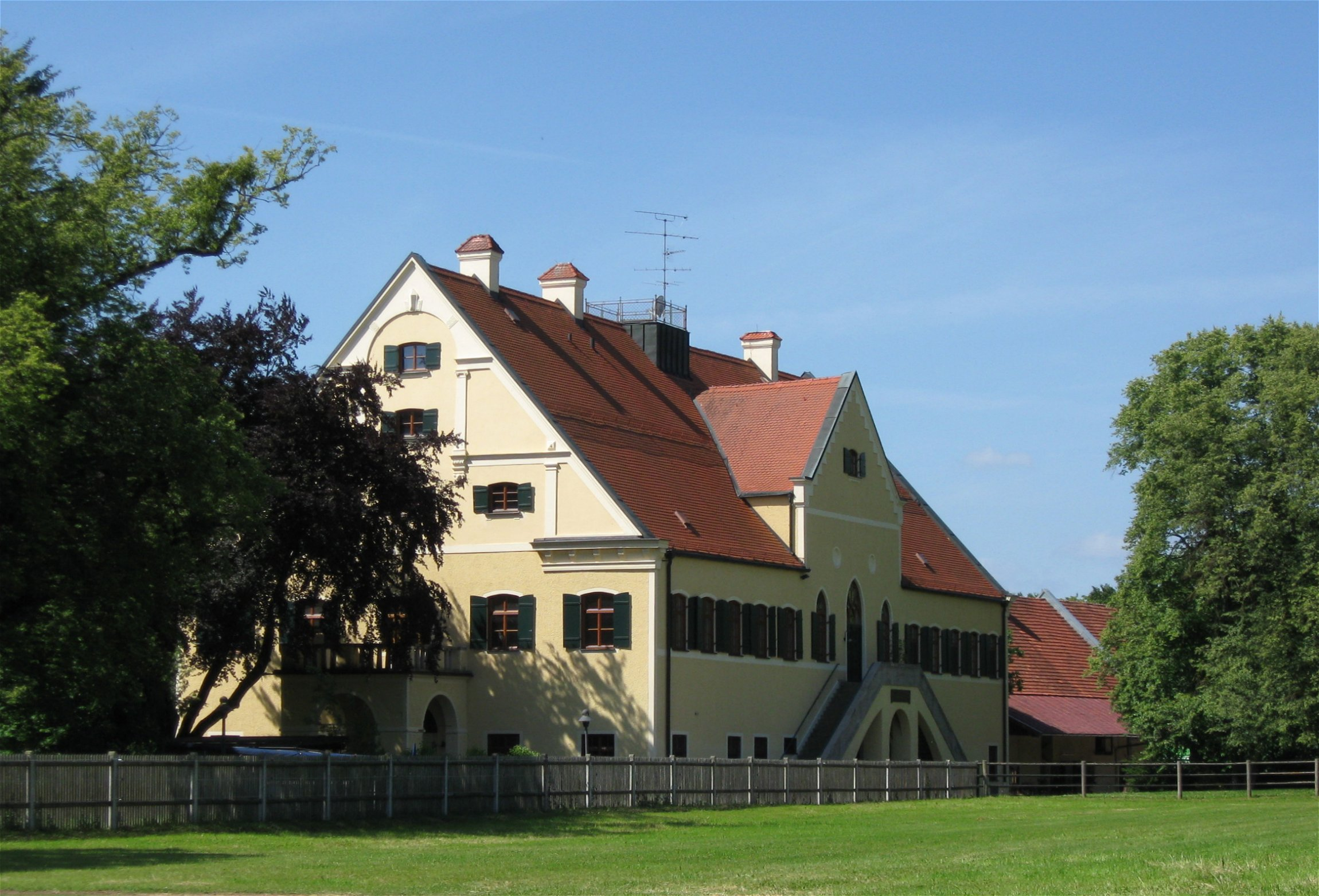
- Wittelsbach mansion in Laufzorn

- Coat of arms

- Location of Oberhaching within Munich district
- Interactive map of Oberhaching
- Location within Germany Location within Bavaria
- Coordinates: 48°01′N 11°35′E
- Country: Germany
- State: Bavaria
- Admin. region: Oberbayern
- District: Munich
- Subdivisions: 3 Ortsteile, 6 Weiler

Government
  - Mayor (2020–26): Stefan Schelle (CSU)

Area
  - Total: 33.06 km^{2} (12.76 sq mi)
- Elevation: 576 m (1,890 ft)

Population (2025-12-31)
  - Total: 13,231
  - Density: 400.2/km^{2} (1,037/sq mi)
- Time zone: UTC+01:00 (CET)
  - Summer (DST): UTC+02:00 (CEST)
- Postal codes: 82041
- Dialling codes: 089
- Vehicle registration: M
- Website: www.oberhaching.de

Oberhaching (German pronunciation: [oːbɐˈhaxɪŋ], lit. 'Upper Haching', in contrast to "Lower Haching") is a municipality in Bavaria, Germany, with 13,638 inhabitants (2020) on an area of 26.6 km^{2} (10.3 sq mi). It is located 15 km (9.3 mi) south of Munich city centre and has a 1,250 year history.

Oberhaching has also become an upmarket residential location thanks to its position on the Munich S-Bahn and its rural location.

Historical population
Year	Pop.	±%
840	517	—
1880	875	+69.2%
1925	2,000	+128.6%
1961	5,865	+193.2%
1970	7,753	+32.2%
1991	10,051	+29.6%
1995	10,840	+7.8%
2005	12,297	+13.4%
2010	12,784	+4.0%
2015	13,371	+4.6%

== Architecture ==
The most important buildings are the originally Romanesque church St Stephan in the centre of Oberhaching, the Gothic church Mariae Geburt in Oberbiberg, the Baroque church Holy Cross in Kreuzpullach and the Renaissance Wittelsbach mansion in Laufzorn. The small palace was built by Albert VI, Duke of Bavaria and later served as a residence for his nephew Maximilian Philipp Hieronymus, Duke of Bavaria-Leuchtenberg.

== History ==
The term “Oberhaching” (Latin: ad superius Hachingen) first appeared in 1140 in the transfer documents of the Schäftlarn Abbey. The oldest architectural remains in Oberhaching can be found in the originally Romanesque church of St. Stephan (since 750 AD). Nothing remains of the surrounding wooden huts of the farmers. The oldest wooden farmhouses still standing today date from the 19th century. The current annex of the Oberhaching elementary school dates from 1872. The town received a new boost with the construction of the railway. Since 1856, there has been a railway line from Munich Central Station via the Großhesseloher Bridge to Deisenhofen and on to Holzkirchen. In 1898, the second railway line was opened from Deisenhofen along the Hachinger Valley via Taufkirchen and Unterhaching to Munich East station. In 1925, Robert Vorhoelzer and Fritz Norkauer built the Deisenhofen post office. In 1934, the Furth train stop was opened.

Johann Rattenhuber (1897–1957), who was from Oberhaching, rose to the rank of lieutenant general in the police force during World War II. Eleonore Baur (1885–1981), a National Socialist, lived and died in Oberhaching.

After 1945 the large influx of German expellees led to a severe housing shortage. The municipality responded by acquiring land and selling it to local developers. At the same time, municipal apartments were built for young families. At the same time, the economy recovered in the 1950s and Oberhaching became the headquarters of well-known companies such as Batscheider Knäckebrot-Fabrik, Semprex König, Rena Büromaschinen, and Dennoch-Verlag. This created jobs in the community. In 1959, the Protestant church “Zum guten Hirten” received its bell tower. In the second half of the 1960s, the course was set for further community development. Concrete plans to significantly increase settlement density and population did not prevail. In the 1980s, the Oberhaching industrial park was created between the two railway lines and has since been expanded.

== Sports ==
Oberhaching is home to the basketball team TSV Oberhaching Tropics who play in Germany's ProB league.

The Paraguay national football team was stationed in Oberhaching during the 2006 FIFA World Cup.

== Transport ==
Oberhaching has its own motorway exit on the A 995, which connects the motorway junction Munich-South (and thus the A 99 and the A 8) with the Munich district of Obergiesing and the Mittlerer Ring. The M 11 connects Oberhaching with Grünwald, located 4 km (2.5 mi) away. In addition, Oberhaching is connected via the Lanzenhaarer Straße with the Bundesstraße 13, which is almost 350 km (220 mi) long and leads from Würzburg via Ingolstadt and Munich to the shore of the Sylvensteinsee (near the border with Austria).

At Deisenhofen station (located in the service area of the Münchner Verkehrs- und Tarifverbund (Munich Transport and Tariff Association, MVV)) on the Munich–Holzkirchen railway line and Munich East–Deisenhofen railway line, the RB 58 of the Bayerische Regiobahn (BRB) and the S3 line of the S-Bahn Munich stop. Another stop of the S3 is located in the district of Furth near the Bayerische Landessportschule (Bavarian State Sports School).

== Notable people ==
- Eleonore Baur (1885-1981), aka "Sister Pia", member of the Nazi Party and acquainted with Adolf Hitler, lived in Oberhaching
