= Bundesautobahn 999 =

Unbuilt federal motorway in Germany

A 999
- Bundesautobahn 999
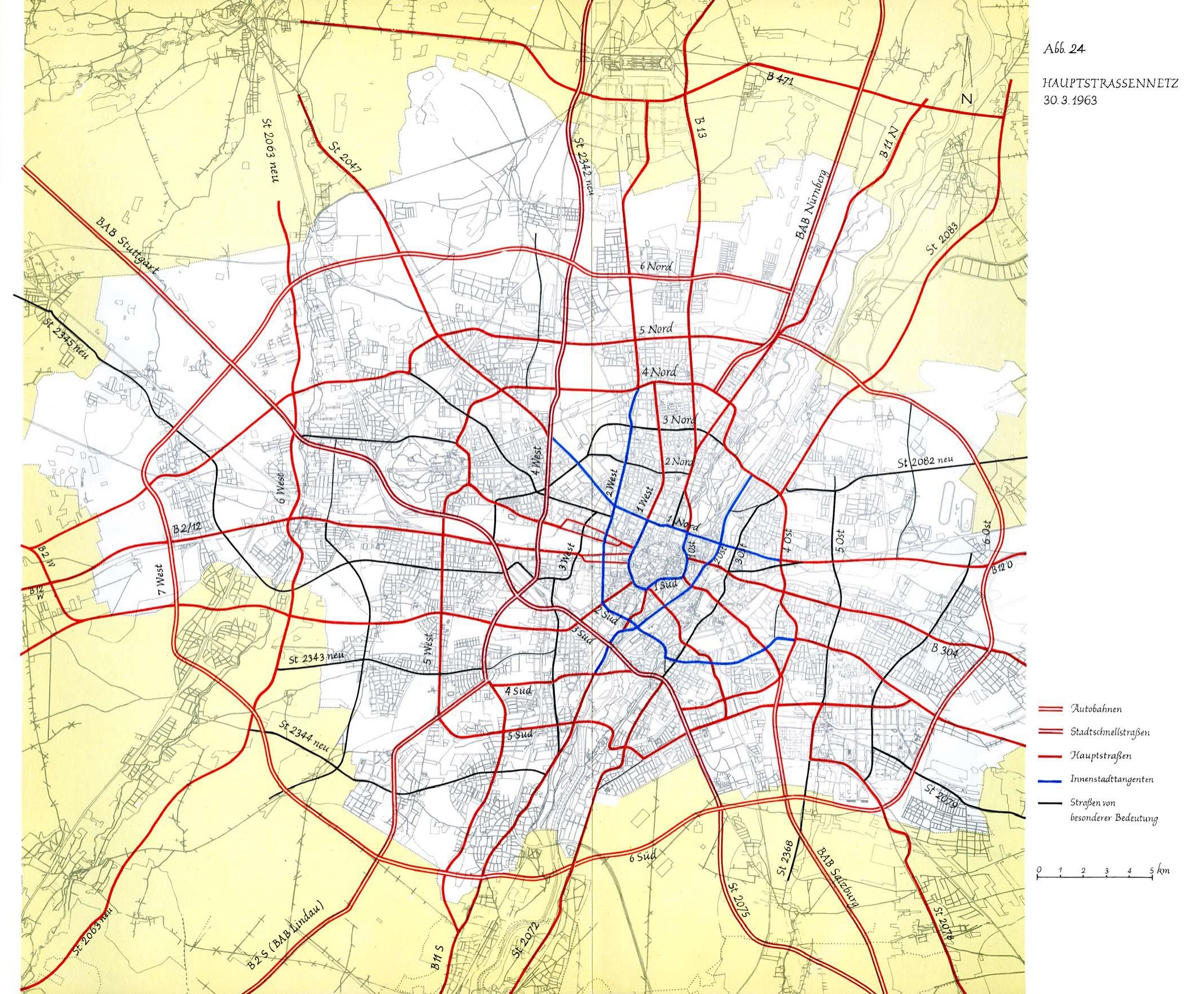

Location
- Country: Germany
- States: Bavaria

Highway system
- Roads in Germany; Autobahns; List; Federal; List; State; E-roads

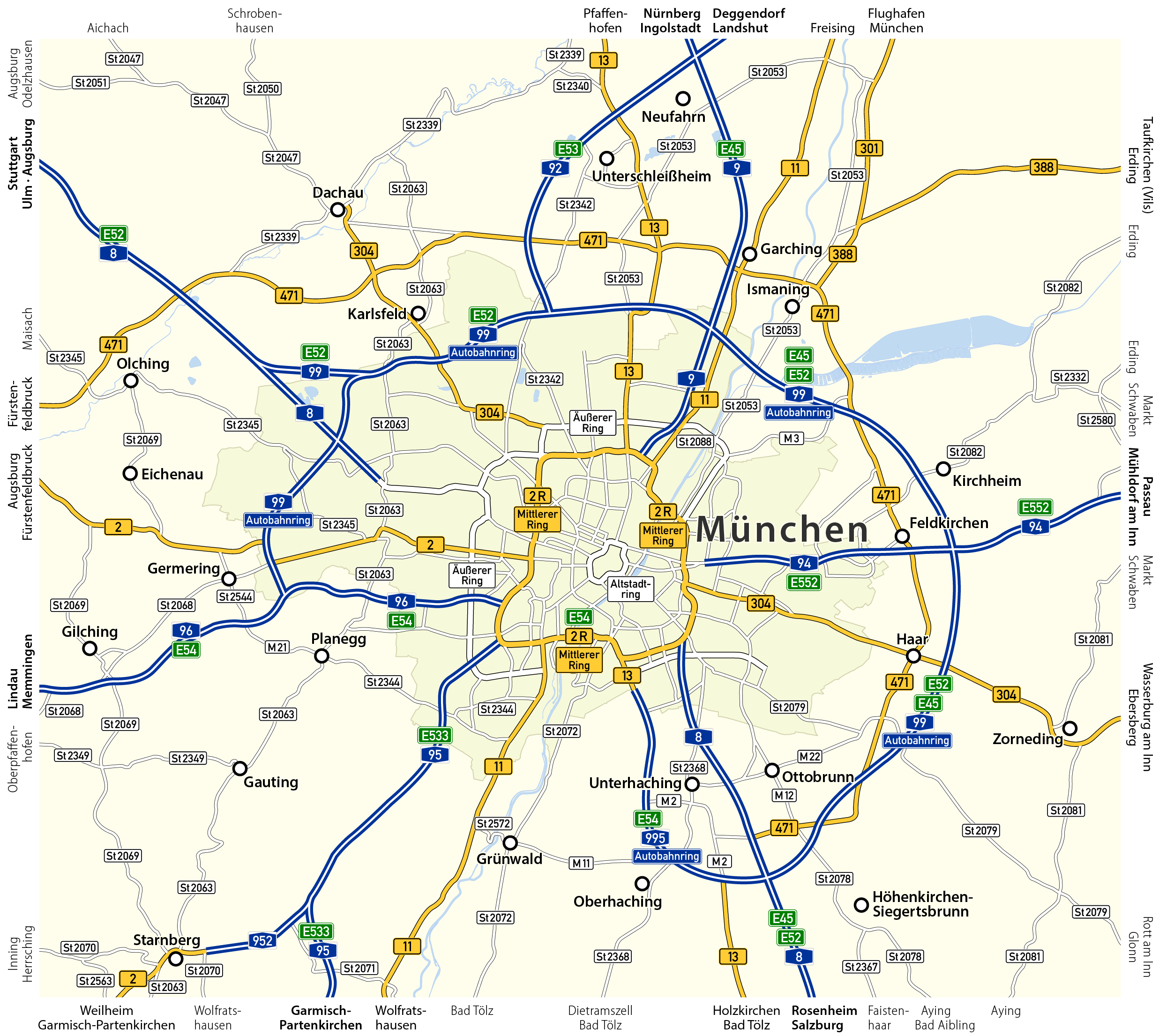
A 999

Bundesautobahn 999 (translates from German as Federal Motorway 999, short form Autobahn 999, abbreviated as BAB 999 or A 999) was the designated number for the Mittlerer Ring in Munich, Germany, a projected second ring road around the inner city districts to accompany the Münchner Ring (Bundesautobahn 99). The project to construct the Mittlerer Ring as an autobahn was not carried out, instead the Bundesstraße 2R now covers most of the planned A 999 trajectory.

== History ==
The urban development plan of 1963 provided for a ring road around Munich. This is referred to in the text only as outer trunk road ring, on the attached map, however, it is shown as a motorway ring.

The planned motorway ring was planned much narrower than the later realized Federal Highway 99 and should run almost entirely on Munich city. Only in the south, the ring should be outside the city limits, the local course is therefore not specified in the urban development plan.

According to the urban development plan, the ring on Munich's urban area should have the following course: from the BAB Salzburg (today A 8) around the planned relief settlement Perlach, along the peace promenade, west of Munich Riem and in the arc around Johanneskirchen over the Leintalerbrücke to the Nuremberg Motorway (today A 9), from there a bit north over Heidemannstraße and Rathenaustraße north on Fasaneriesee over to a part of a planned motorway ring in Allach and Langwied (Munich), already started before the Second World War, on the already existing Langwieder shamrock Crossing with the BAB Stuttgart (today A 8), continue to Aubing and the planned relief settlement Freiham along the city limits. Outside the city, the course in the arc near the city boundary should lead back to the BAB Salzburg (today A 8).

== Gallery ==
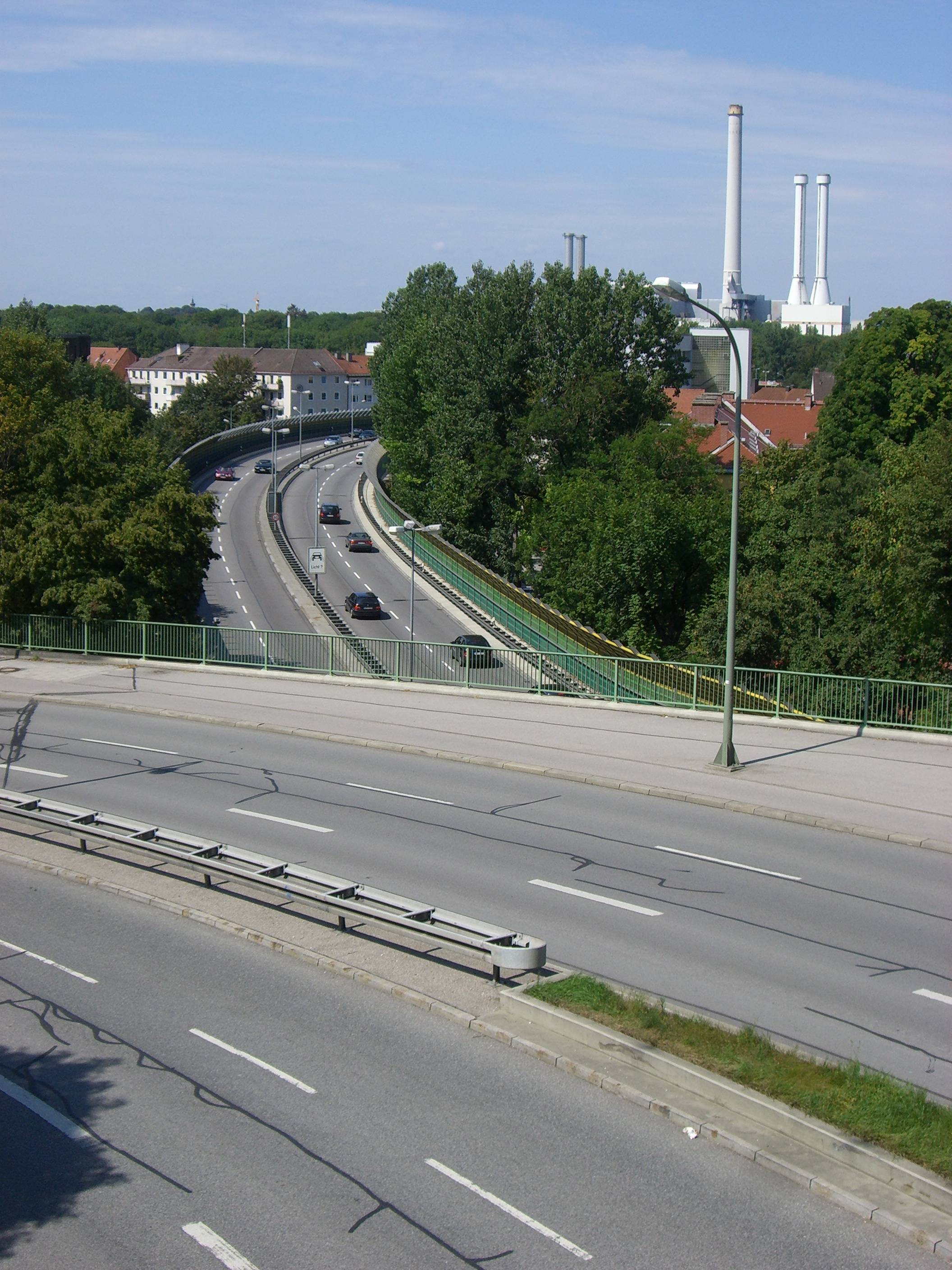

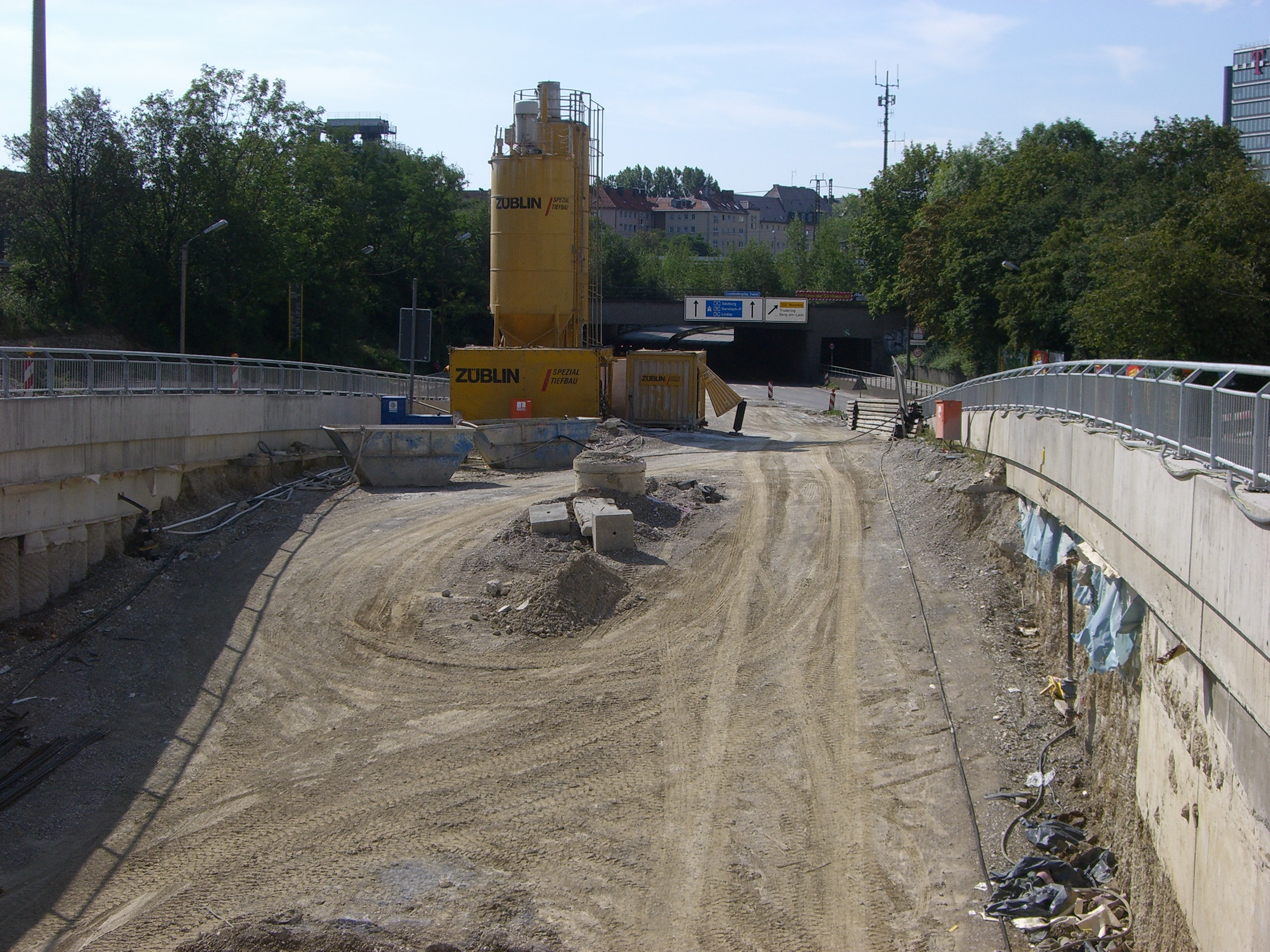

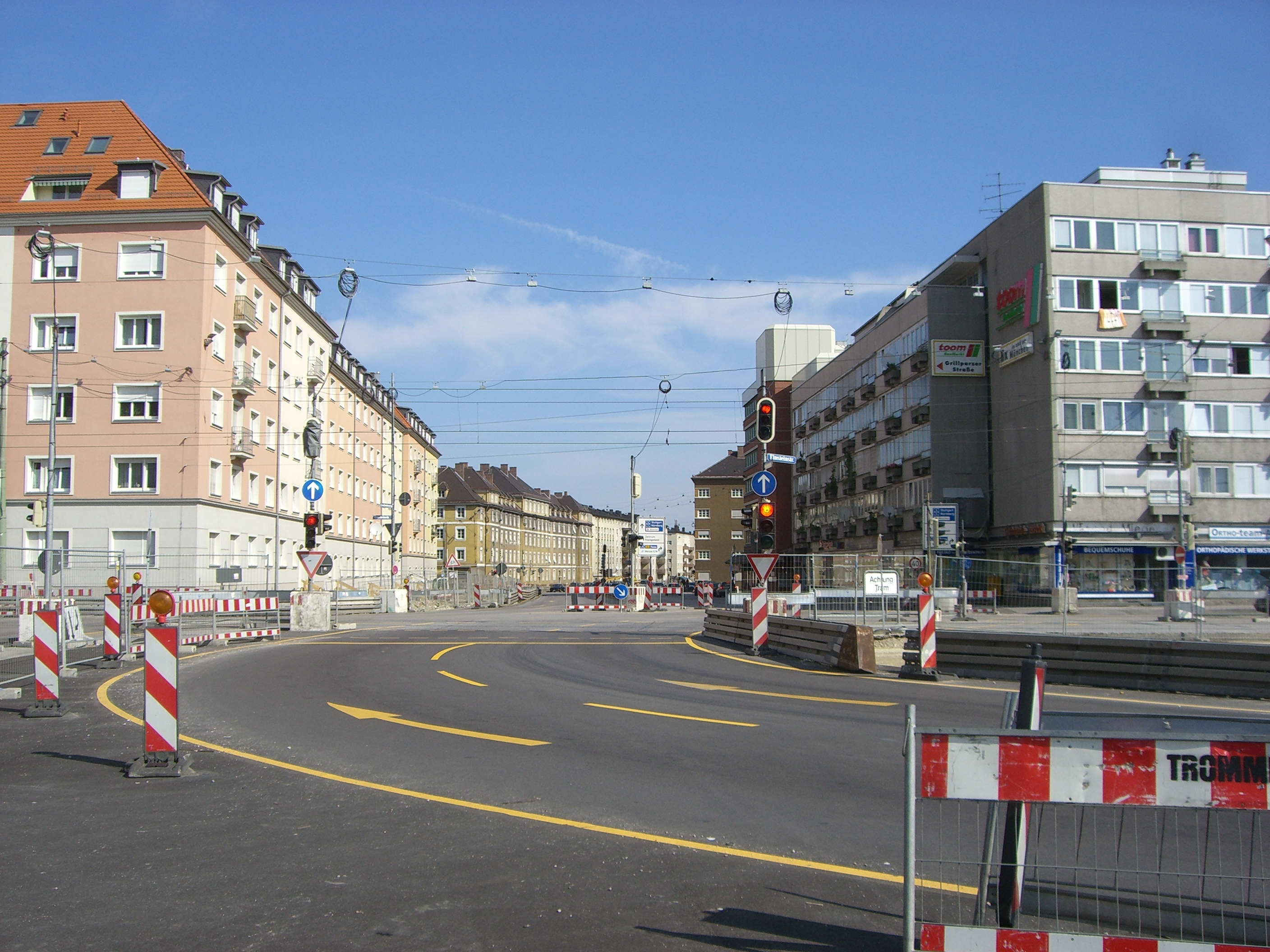
