= Bundesstraße 2 R =

Federal highway in Germany

B 2 R
- Bundesstraße 2 R
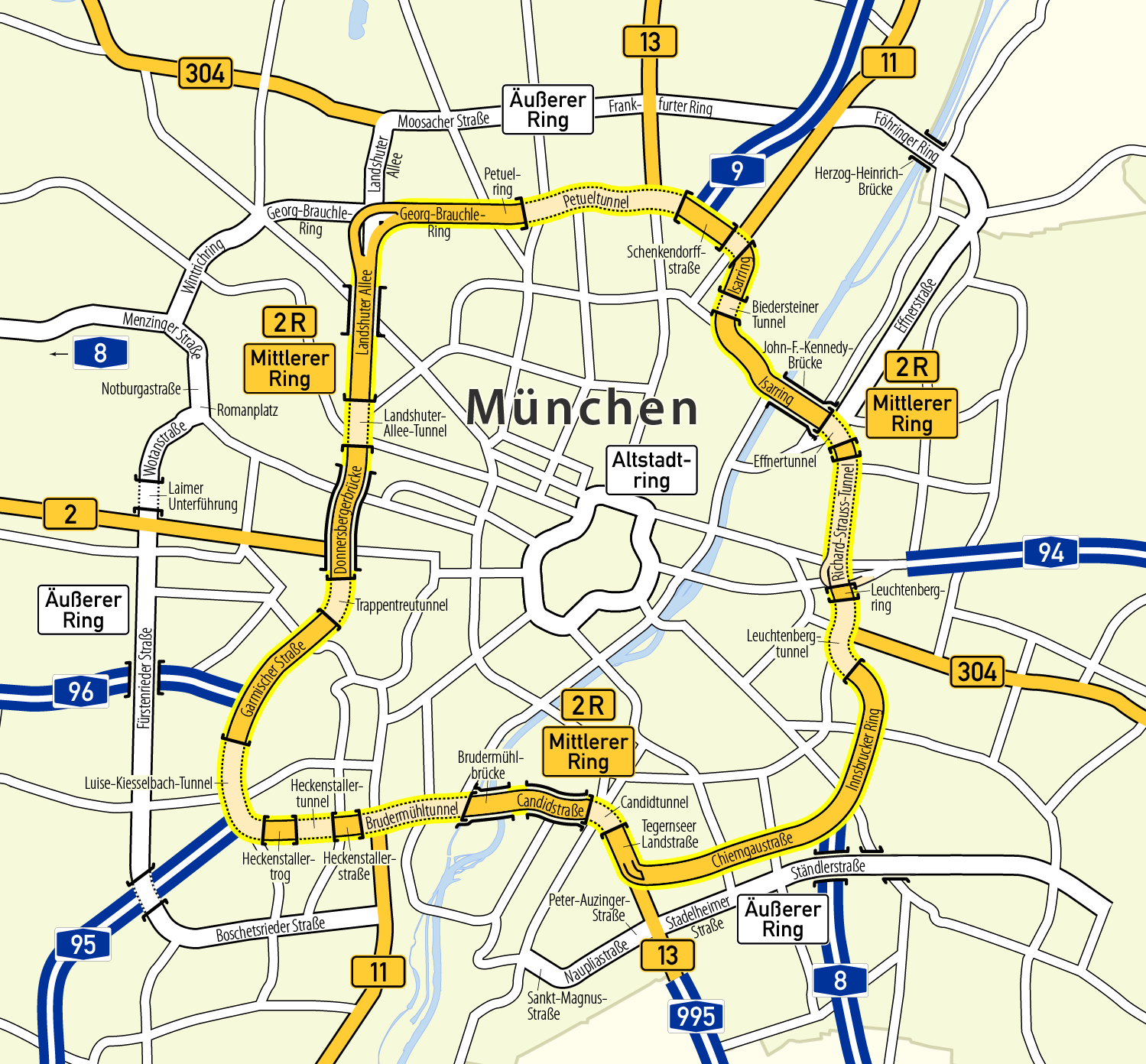

Route information
- Length: 28 km (17 mi)

Location
- Country: Germany
- States: Bavaria

Highway system
- Roads in Germany; Autobahns; List; Federal; List; State; E-roads

The Bundesstraße 2R is a German federal highway (German: Bundesstraße) in Bavaria. It follows most of the proposed A999, forming a ring road within the city of Munich in Bavaria, is 28 km (17 mi) long, and suffers the worst traffic-jams in the country. It is called the "Middle Ring" (German: Mittlerer Ring) because of its concentric position between the Altstadtring and the incomplete Outer Ring, as well as being within the Autobahnring.

== Traffic importance ==
The Middle Ring is the backbone of all traffic in Munich, since it offers the fastest connection to all major traffic axes. It replaced all the Bundesstraßen that ran through the city center, even Bundesstraße 2, after which it is named (the R stands for Ring). Within the Middle Ring, there are only municipal streets.

Of the eight Autobahns that go to Munich, six of them have access to the Middle Ring. The A8 to Salzburg), the A9 (to Nuremberg and Berlin) and the A96 (towards Lindau) all have direct access to the Middle Ring. The A94 is connected to the Ring via a short section of Einsteinstraße, but an exit from the A94 goes directly into the northbound Richard-Strauss-Tunnel on the Middle Ring. The A95 is connected to the Middle Ring by the B2, and the A995 is connected via the B13. However, both Bundesstraßen are built to Autobahn standards and signed as such. Only the A8 towards Stuttgart has a longer connection to the Middle Ring, a 7 km-long section of the Verdistraße and Arnulfstraße. The A92 ends at the Autobahnring, but is connected to the Middle Ring via the A9.

The E54 runs along the southwest section of the Middle Ring between the A96 and the A995. This section of the route is also heavily used by long-distance traffic, because neither the A99 motorway ring nor the originally planned Outer Ring have been completed.
