= Inn Valley Autobahn =

Motorway in Austria

Motorway A12
- Inn Valley Autobahn A12
- Inntal Autobahn

Route information
- Part of E45 E60 E533
- Length: 153.32 km (95.27 mi)

Major junctions
- From: A 93
- To: S16 in Landeck

Location
- Country: Austria
- States: Tyrol
- Major cities: Innsbruck

Highway system
- Highways of Austria; Autobahns; Expressways; State Roads
← A 11	→ A 13

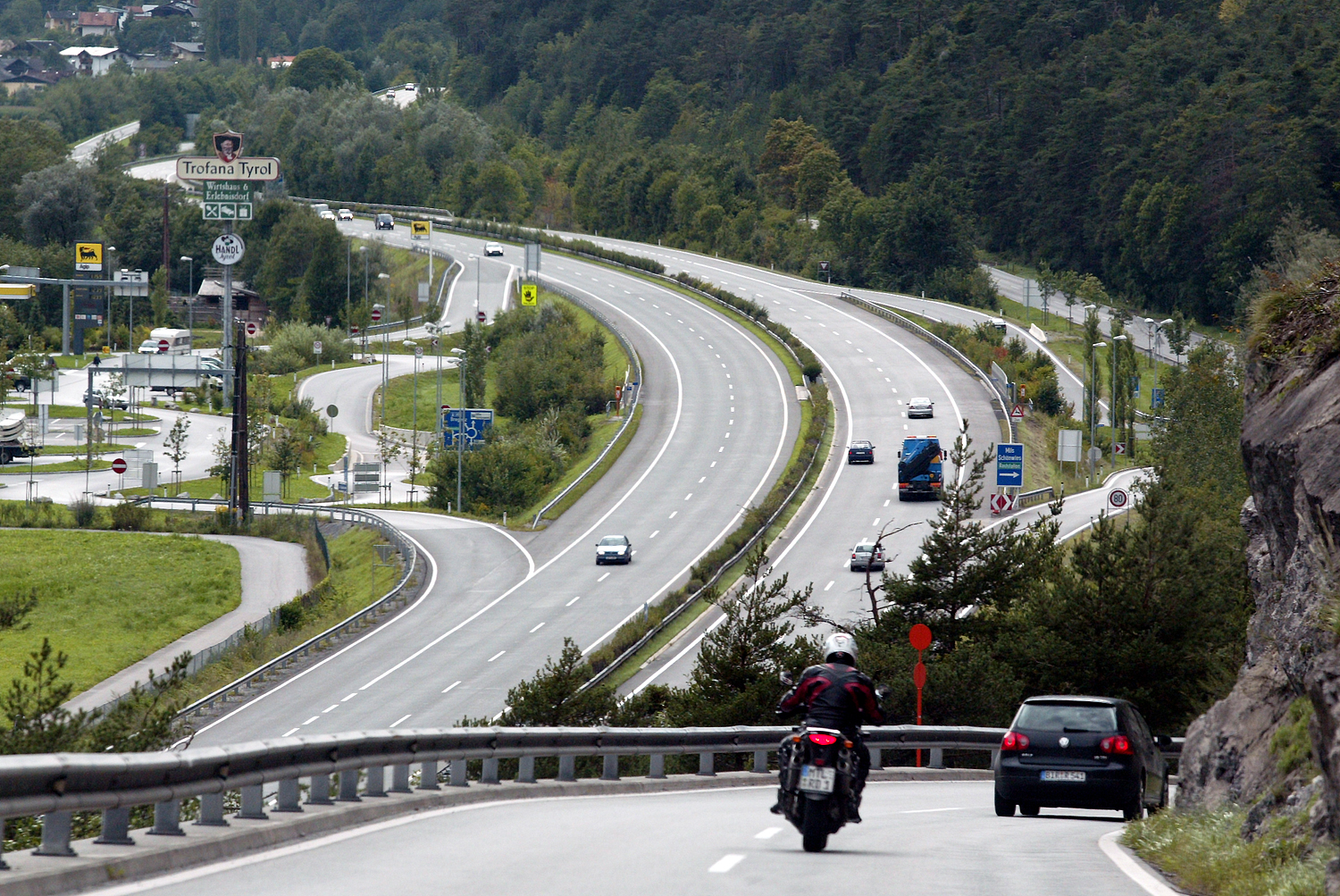
E 60 as Inntal Autobahn A12 near Innsbruck in Austria

The Inn Valley Motorway or Inntal Autobahn A12 is an autobahn in the Austrian federal state of Tyrol and part of Euroroutes E45 and E60.

It begins as a continuation of the German Bundesautobahn 93 on the German-Austrian border near Kiefersfelden/Kufstein and runs via Innsbruck (intersection with the Brenner Autobahn A13) to Zams, where it transitions to the S16 Arlberg expressway (Arlberg Schnellstraße). It runs parallel to the River Inn and runs through the Inn Valley fresh air region (Luftsanierungsgebiet).

== Importance ==
The Kufstein–Innsbruck section, together with the Brenner Autobahn and the German A93 and A8, form the main transport axis from Munich over the Alps to Verona and Modena. In addition the A12 links Tyrol via the so-called German Corner (Deutsches Eck) to Salzburg and the West Autobahn (A1) to Vienna.

The A12 was the first autobahn in Austria that was equipped with an intelligent transportation system. These overhead signs provide information to the motorist on every type of situation (road conditions, traffic, weather, etc.) as well as speed limits.

== Environmental issues ==
In 2005, and again in 2011 after Austrian legislation was changed, the European Court of Justice declared that rules prohibiting use of part of the A12 by lorries of over 7.5 tonnes carrying certain goods were an unjustified restriction of the free movement of goods within the European Union, one of the fundamental principles of EU law. This was despite the fact that the Austrian legislation was a response to EU directives on air quality.

During the summer vacation period in 2019, every weekend from mid-June to mid-September, on the section around Innsbruck as well as on A13 (Austria) Brenner Autobahn it was not allowed to leave the motorway to avoid a traffic jam. This measure was a controversial issue. The most important reason is to protect the local population suffering from the consequences of the denser traffic on rural roads leading parallel to the motorway. This kind of traffic leads to additional congestion, noise and pollution. On the other hand, local hotel and restaurant owners were worried about loss of business. Furthermore, whoever wants to avoid the traffic jam will find a pretext for his intention to leave the motorway in case of an inquiry by the Austrian police. However, there is no obligation to show a confirmation for a hotel reservation along the road.

== See also ==
- Autobahns of Austria
