= West Autobahn =

Road in Austria

Motorway A1
- West Autobahn A1

Route information
- Part of E55 E60
- Length: 292 km (181 mi)

Major junctions
- From: Vienna-Hietzing
- To: A 8

Location
- Country: Austria
- Regions: Vienna, Lower Austria, Upper Austria, Salzburg
- Major cities: Vienna, Sankt Pölten, Linz, Salzburg

Highway system
- Highways of Austria; Autobahns; Expressways; State Roads
← A 26	→ A 2

The West Autobahn (A1) was the first motorway (Autobahn) to be built in Austria, originating from plans drawn up for the so-called Reichsautobahn system. Completed in 1967, today it runs from the outskirts of Vienna via Linz to Salzburg, where it joins the German Bundesautobahn 8 at the Walserberg border crossing.

The A1 is Austria's main east–west thoroughfare and part of the major European routes E55 and E60.

== History ==
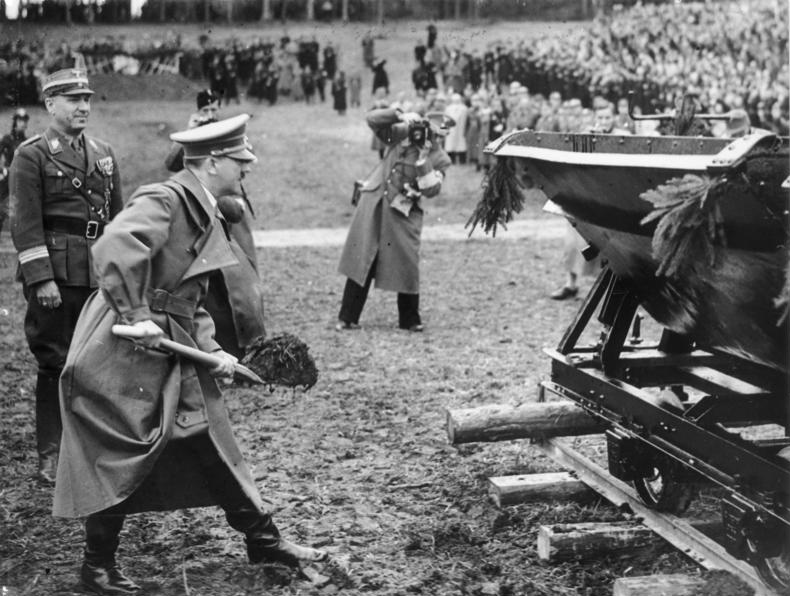
7 April 1938: Hitler turns the first sod at Walserberg, on the left Fritz Todt

The construction of the first two sections near Salzburg started a few weeks after the Anschluss annexation of Austria in 1938, as the Nazi authorities had a long time before made plans for an eastern continuation of the Reichsautobahn 26 from Munich to Salzburg (the present-day Bundesautobahn 8) towards Linz and Vienna in what was to become the German Ostmark. However, only two sections around Salzburg with a total length of 12.5 km (7.8 mi) were opened to traffic when works discontinued in 1942 due to World War II.

After the war, the interrupted construction works on the third section to Eugendorf were finished, nevertheless, the further continuation could not be resumed under Allied occupation from 1945 to 1955. Between 1947 and 1965 the completed sections northwest of Salzburg were used as a racing track, known as "Little AVUS", the site of an annual motorcycle race, later called Grand Prix of Austria, with racer Helmut Krackowizer among the first winners.

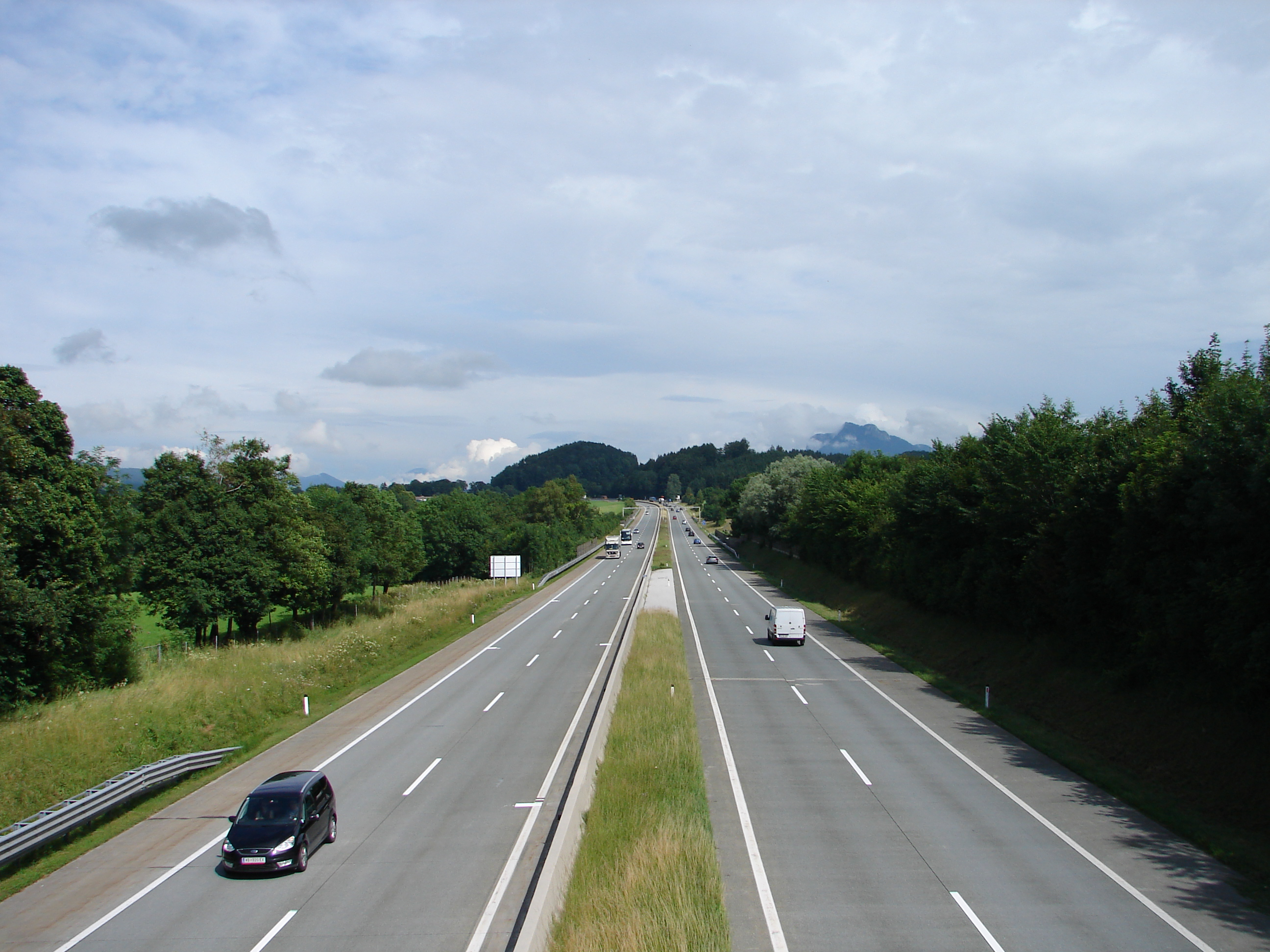
A1 near Eugendorf, 2009

The construction of the A1 continued upon the signing of the Austrian State Treaty in 1955. The first post-war section up to Mondsee in Upper Austria was opened in 1958, the route from Salzburg to Vienna was completed with the opening of the last segment at Amstetten. Finishing works near Strengberg on the border between Upper and Lower Austria and of parts between Lambach and Vöcklabruck in Upper Austria ended in the 1970s. In Vienna, the West Autobahn intersects with the B1 Wiener Straße highway in the Hietzing district at kilometre 9; former plans for a continuation to the city beltway were never carried out.

Traffic significantly increased after the fall of the Iron Curtain in 1989 and the 2004 enlargement of the European Union. Now that it represents such an important connection between East and West, portions of the A1 between the junction of Steinhäusl west of Vienna and the Voralpenkreuz interchange with Innkreis Autobahn (A8) and Pyhrn Autobahn (A9) at Sattledt are gradually being expanded by the publicly owned ASFiNAG corporation to three lanes in each direction.

== Junctions ==
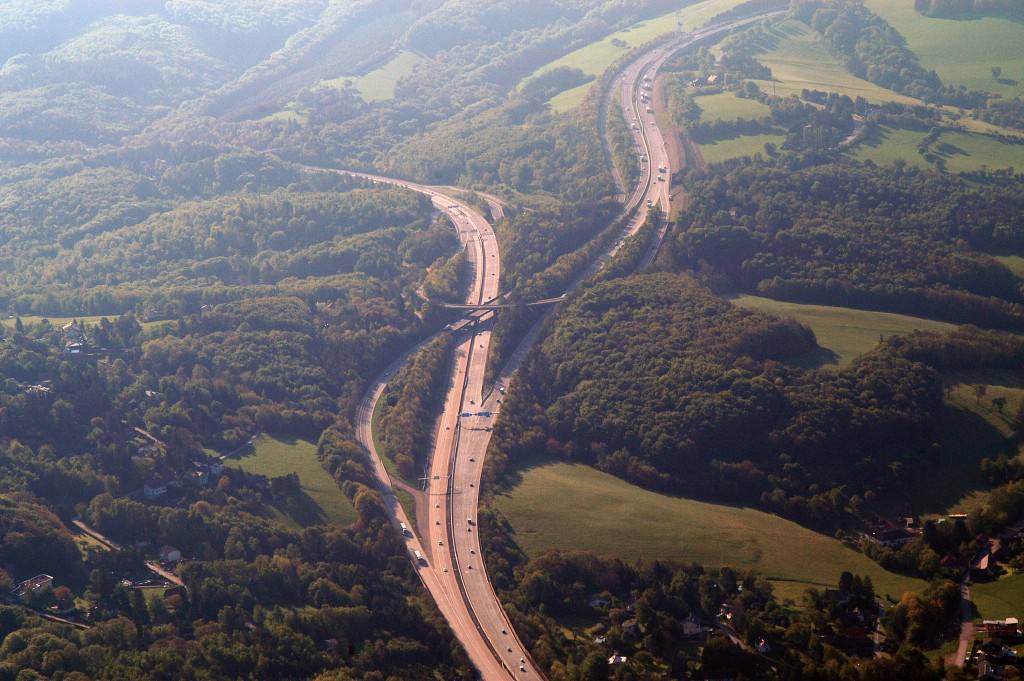
Steinhäusl junction

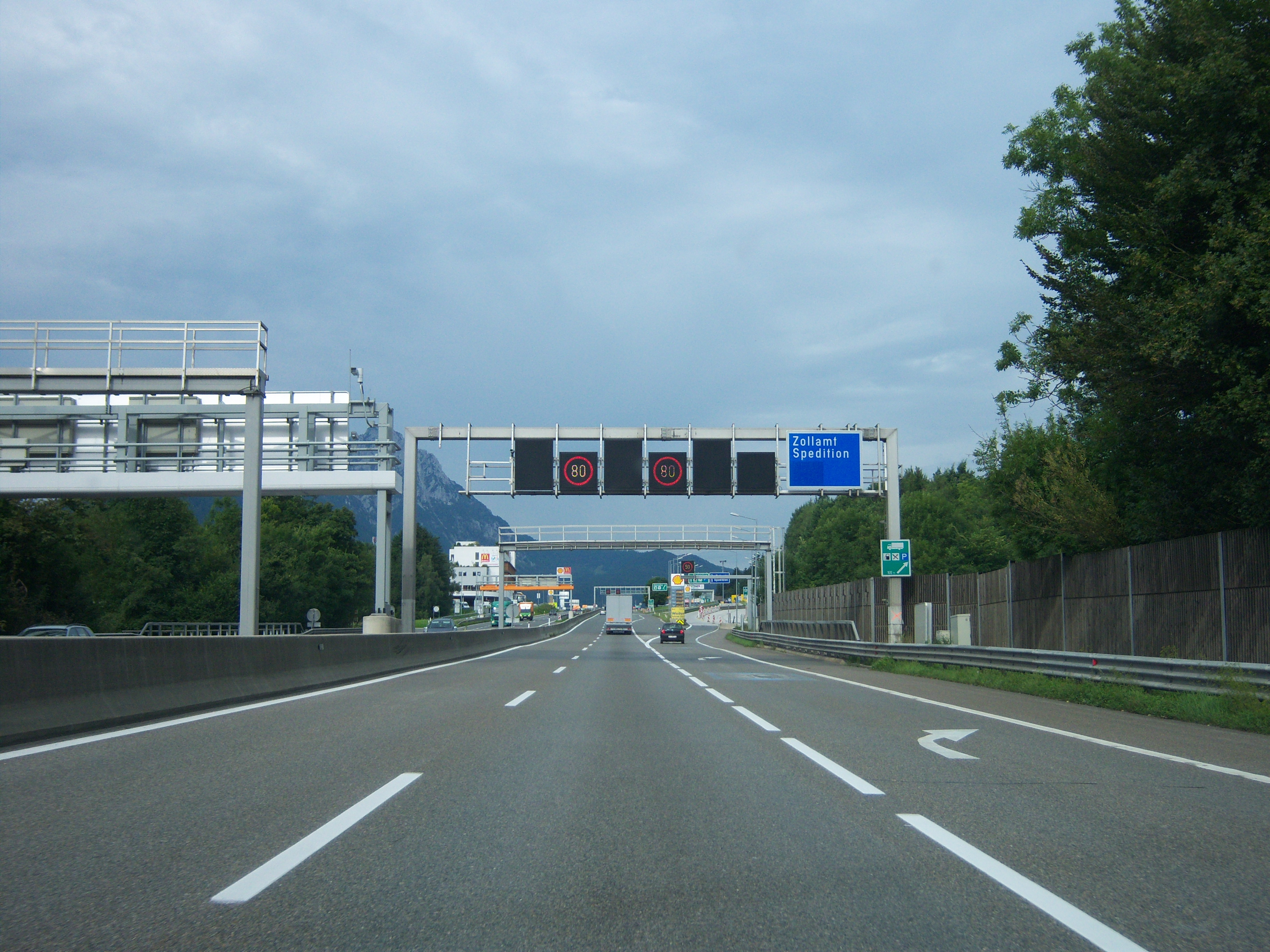
Walserberg border crossing

The motorway links to the following additional motorways and major roads:

Wiener Straße	(9) Vienna-Hietzing
E60	(32) Steinhäusl
Kremser Schnellstraße	(55) Sankt Pölten
E55	(169) Linz
E552	(175) Haid
E56 E57	(196) Voralpenkreuz Sattledt
E52 E55	(298) Salzburg
(Germany) E52 E60	(301) Walserberg

== See also ==
- Autobahns of Austria
