= E641 =

E641 or E-641 may be:

- The E-number of the flavour enhancer L-leucine
- European route E641, a European route class B road connecting the Austrian cities of Wörgl and Salzburg via Sankt Johann in Tirol and Bad Reichenhall in Germany
