= European route E52 =

Road in trans-European E-road network

E52

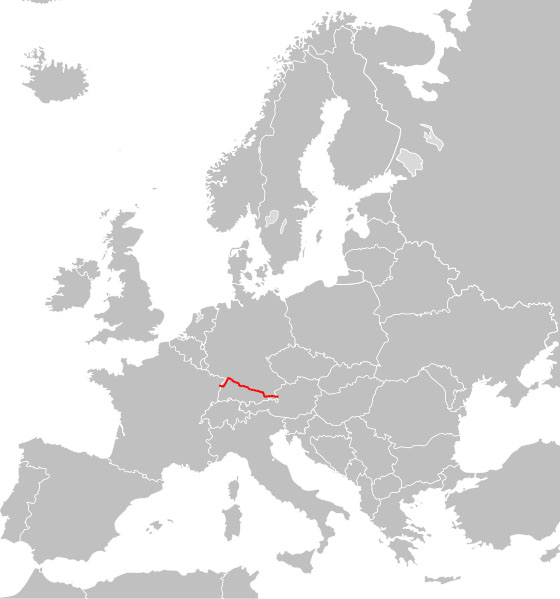

Route information
- Length: 554 km (344 mi)

Major junctions
- West end: Strasbourg, France
- East end: Salzburg, Austria

Location
- Countries: France; Germany; Austria

Highway system
- International E-road network; A Class; B Class

European route E 52 is a road that is part of the International E-road network. It runs from Strasbourg, France to in Salzburg, Austria.

== Route ==
The road follows: Strasbourg - Kehl - Baden-Baden - Karlsruhe - Pforzheim - Stuttgart - Ulm - Augsburg - Munich - Rosenheim - Salzburg.

France
Grand Est
Street	City	Hub	Note
N 4	Strasbourg	A 35 E25	
European Union	Strasbourg-Parc du Rhin		Rhine
Germany
Baden-Württemberg
Street	City	Hub	Note
A 5	Kehl		
	Appenweier	E35 A 5	
A 8	Karlsruhe	E35 A 5	
	Leonberg	E41 A 81	
	Stuttgart	E41 A 81	
	Stuttgart-Echterdingen		Stuttgart Airport
	Ulm	E43 A 7	
Bavaria
Street	City	Hub	Note
A 99	Munich-Eschenried		
	Munich-Feldmoching	E53 A 92	
	Munich-Nord	E45 A 9	
	Munich-Ost	E552 A 94	
A 8	Munich-Süd	E54 A 995	
	Rosenheim-Inntal	E45 E60 A 93	
European Union	Schwarzbach		
Austria
Salzburg
Street	City	Hub	Note
A 1	Wals-Siezenheim		
	Salzburg	E55 E60 A 10 A 1	
