= Unterhaching =

Unterhaching Haching (Bavarian)
- Municipality
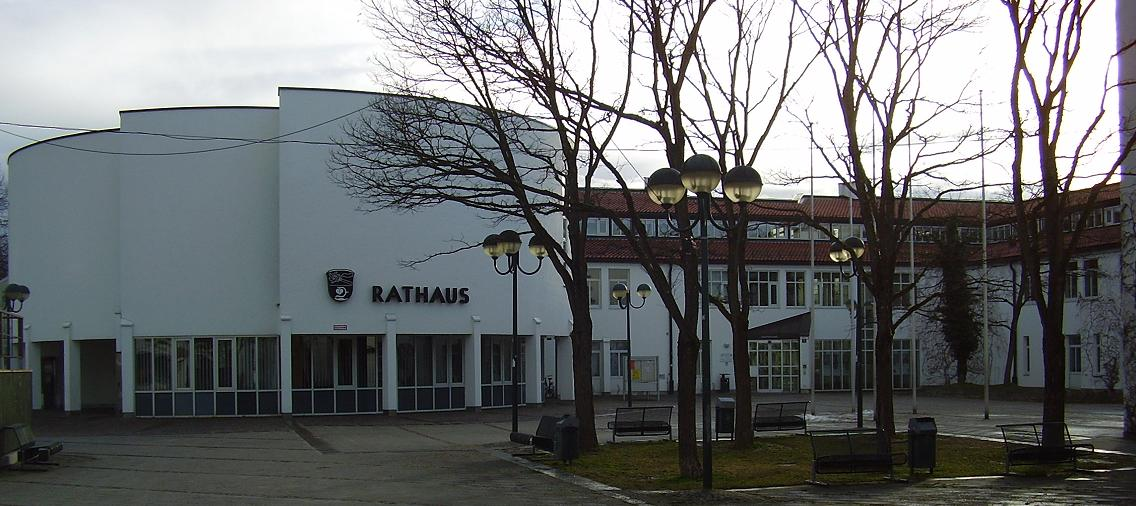
- Town hall

- Coat of arms

- Location of Unterhaching within Munich district
- Interactive map of Unterhaching
- Location within Germany Location within Bavaria
- Coordinates: 48°03′57″N 11°36′36″E
- Country: Germany
- State: Bavaria
- Admin. region: Upper Bavaria
- District: Munich

Government
  - Mayor (2020–26): Korbinian Rauschr (CSU)

Area
  - Total: 10.37 km^{2} (4.00 sq mi)
- Elevation: 556 m (1,824 ft)

Population (2025-12-31)
  - Total: 26,611
  - Density: 2,566/km^{2} (6,646/sq mi)
- Time zone: UTC+01:00 (CET)
  - Summer (DST): UTC+02:00 (CEST)
- Postal codes: 82008
- Dialling codes: 089
- Vehicle registration: M, MU, AIB, WOR
- Website: www.unterhaching.de

Unterhaching (German pronunciation: [ʊntɐˈhaxɪŋ], lit. 'Lower Haching', in contrast to "Upper Haching"; Central Bavarian: Haching) is the second largest municipality in the district of Munich in Bavaria, Germany, located to the south of Munich city centre and easily accessible via two federal motorways, Bundesautobahn 8 and Bundesautobahn 995, and also on the Munich S-Bahn, connecting Unterhaching to Marienplatz in less than 20 minutes. The municipality is best known for its football club SpVgg Unterhaching, who played in the Bundesliga in 1999–2001 and is also home to a CO_{2} neutral district heating network.

== History ==
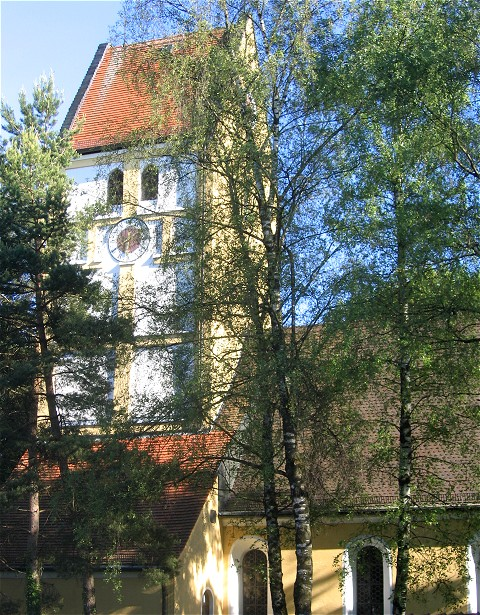
St. Korbinian Church is the oldest building in Unterhaching and is located within the "Old Village".

Based upon the discovery of graves, the settlement of the Haching Valley can be traced back as far as 1100 B.C. The settlement of the Bavarian tribes is believed to have occurred between the fifth and eighth centuries.

The name "Haching" comes from the family name "Hacho" and the aristocracy of the Hahilinga. The name Haching is first recorded in a document from the Schäftlarn monastery in the year 806, left by the abbot Petto. Therefore, Haching is hundreds of years older than Munich.

The name "Unterhaching" (lat. inferiori hachingin) emerges for the first time in the year 1180 in a possession listing of the bishop of Freising (Freesing).

Up until the 1803 secularization the surrounding monasteries were the primary landowners in the area. Also derived from this is the municipal coat of arms, which today shows the abbot staff of the Schäftlarn monastery and the sea-rose sheet from the coat of arms of the monastery Tegernsee. Unterhaching began the 20th century as purely a farming village. The number of inhabitants exploded from 616 inhabitants in 1900 to 20,545 in 2000.

In 1955 Unterhaching split from Ottobrunn and became an independent municipality.

In 1968 the building of two new large housing estates began, "Grünau" and Fasanenpark, which began the development of the municipality into a modern housing development.

=== Heraldry ===
Coat of arms of Unterhaching	Divided per fess azure and argent; in chief a slanted golden abbot's staff with a sudarium, in base a green water lily leaf floating above blue waves.

== Sports ==
Unterhaching is well known in Germany for its football team SpVgg Unterhaching, which played in the Bundesliga during the 1999–2000 and 2000–01 seasons. The club now oscillates between the regional state league (the fourth tier) and the third division and share local rivalries with 1860 Munich and Bayern Munich's reserve team. In 2001, SpVgg Unterhaching won the national five-a-side indoor football cup.

The SpVgg Unterhaching also has a very successful bob-sledding team, with multiple world and European titles. The Olympic gold-medalist Christoph Langen is a member.

The volleyball department is just as successful TSV Unterhaching and played for six years in Bundesliga.

== Economics ==
Unterhaching is undergoing dynamic development in recent years. Unterhaching is the base for Develey, a manufacturer of mustards and other fine foods, and the headquarters for the chewing gum manufacturer Wm. Wrigley Jr. Company. The company Anton Schrobenhauser has become one of the largest building contractors in Munich and the surrounding areas. The headquarters campus (Campeon) of Infineon Technologies, a global leader in semiconductors, is accessible on foot despite being officially part of the neighboring Munich suburb of Neubiberg. Several other large service companies are also headquartered in Unterhaching, such as Sportscheck formerly part of Otto Group and now part of Signa Holding as well as software firms, e.g. InterFace AG

== Geothermal plant ==
Unterhaching began construction on a geothermal power plant called Geothermie Unterhaching in 2004. The plant was the first industrial-scaled project in Germany to use the Kalina cycle. The drilling works lasted about six month for each of the two boreholes. While the first drill hole was finished in fall 2004, the second was completed in winter 2007. The plant became operational in the winter of 2007/2008. The plant was shut down in 2017, as temperature fluctuations meant it could only generate power effectively in the summer.

== Twin towns – sister cities ==
Unterhaching is twinned with:

- Adeje, Spain
- Bischofshofen, Austria
- Le Vésinet, France
- Witney, England, United Kingdom
- Żywiec, Poland
