= Bundesautobahn 995 =

Federal motorway in Germany

A 995
- Bundesautobahn 995

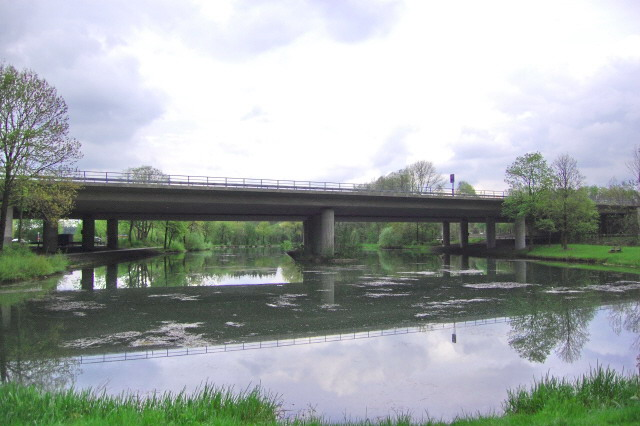
- Motorway pond in Taufkirchen

Route information
- Length: 11 km (6.8 mi)

Major junctions
- North end: B 13 in Munich
- South end: A 8/A 99 in Brunnthal

Location
- Country: Germany
- States: Bavaria

Highway system
- Roads in Germany; Autobahns; List; Federal; List; State; E-roads
← A 980	→ A 1

The Bundesautobahn 995 (translates from German as Federal Motorway 995, short form Autobahn 995, abbreviated as BAB 995 or A 995) is an autobahn near Munich in southern Germany. It connects the southwestern parts of Munich with the A 8 (Munich – Salzburg ) and A 99. It is around eleven kilometers long and has two lanes and hard a shoulder in each direction.

== History ==
The entire section of road was completed in 1972 for the Olympic Games as the "Unterhaching – Taufkirchen bypass".

== Status ==
Despite the continuous blue signage and full motorway provisions, originally only the short stretch between the Munich-South junction and Sauerlach was actually dedicated as a federal motorway. The route between the Sauerlach junction and the southern border of Munich (at the Munich-Giesing junction) was designated as "Bundesstraße 13 (new)". The "Autobahndirektion Südbayern" was responsible for this section according to Section 3 (2) (a) of the Ordinance on the Transfer of Powers under the German Federal Trunk Roads Act. Therefore, no motorway or federal road number was given for the entire route, only the European route E54.

On 1 January 2018 the entire route was finally upgraded to Bundesautobahn 995 (BAB 995), which also required the installation of new signs showing the Autobahn number.

As of 1 October 2019, the responsibilities for the A 995 are with the Hohenbrunn motorway maintenance department.

== Exit list ==
State	District	Location	km	mi	Exit	Name	Destinations	Notes
Bayern	Munich	Munich	0	0.0	1	München-Giesing	B 2 R – Munich	northern endpoint of motorway
Bayern	Munich (district)	Unterhaching	1.4	0.87	2	Unterhaching-Nord	Unterhaching-Nord	
Bayern	Munich (district)	Unterhaching	4.6	2.9	3	Taufkirchen-West	Taufkirchen-West, Unterhaching-Süd	
Bayern	Munich (district)	Taufkirchen	7.2	4.5	4	Oberhaching	Oberhaching, Dietramszell, Grünwald, Taufkirchen-Süd	Dietramszell is only signed southbound
Bayern	Munich (district)	Taufkirchen	7.5	4.7	Parking area	Potzham-West	Potzham-West parking area	only southbound
Bayern	Munich (district)	Taufkirchen	9.3	5.8	5	Sauerlach	Sauerlach, Bad Tölz, Unterhaching	Bad Tölz only signed southbound, Unterhaching only signed northbound
Bayern	Munich (district)	Brunnthal	10.5	6.5	6	Kreuz München-Süd	A 8 – Salzburg, Innsbruck; A 99 – Nürnberg/Passau, Munich Airport, Ramersdorf	southern endpoint of motorway
1.000 mi = 1.609 km; 1.000 km = 0.621 mi: Concurrency terminus; Incomplete access; Proposed; Route transition
