= European route E55 =

Road in trans-European E-road network

E55

Route information
- Length: 3,305 km (2,054 mi)

Major junctions
- North end: Helsingborg, Sweden
- South end: Kalamata, Greece

Location
- Countries: Sweden, Denmark, Germany, Czech Republic, Austria, Italy, Greece

Highway system
- International E-road network; A Class; B Class

European route E55 is an E-route. It starts in southern Sweden, crosses the Øresund strait to Denmark, and passes through more water (the western Baltic Sea) to reach continental Europe on Rostock, Germany. Thence it continues further southward on land through Germany and into the Czech Republic, Austria, and Italy. Finally, it passes through the Ionian Sea to serve western Greece.

The route passes through the following cities in order: Helsingborg ... Helsingør – Copenhagen – Køge – Vordingborg – Nykøbing Falster – Gedser ... Rostock – Berlin – Lübbenau – Dresden – Ústí nad Labem – Prague – Tábor – Linz – Salzburg – Villach – Tarvisio – Udine – Palmanova – Venice – Ravenna – Cesena – Rimini – Fano – Ancona – Pescara – Canosa di Puglia – Bari – Brindisi ... Igoumenitsa – Preveza – Rio – Patras – Pyrgos – Kalamata.

From Helsingborg, the route was supposed to continue northward through Sweden and into Finland, but a decision was made to keep the E4 designation in Sweden, formerly used for a European route from Lisbon to Helsinki. The E55 is not and has not been signposted in Sweden. Since 2018, the E55 is not signposted between Helsingør and Køge in Denmark, but is signposted south of Køge.

== Route ==
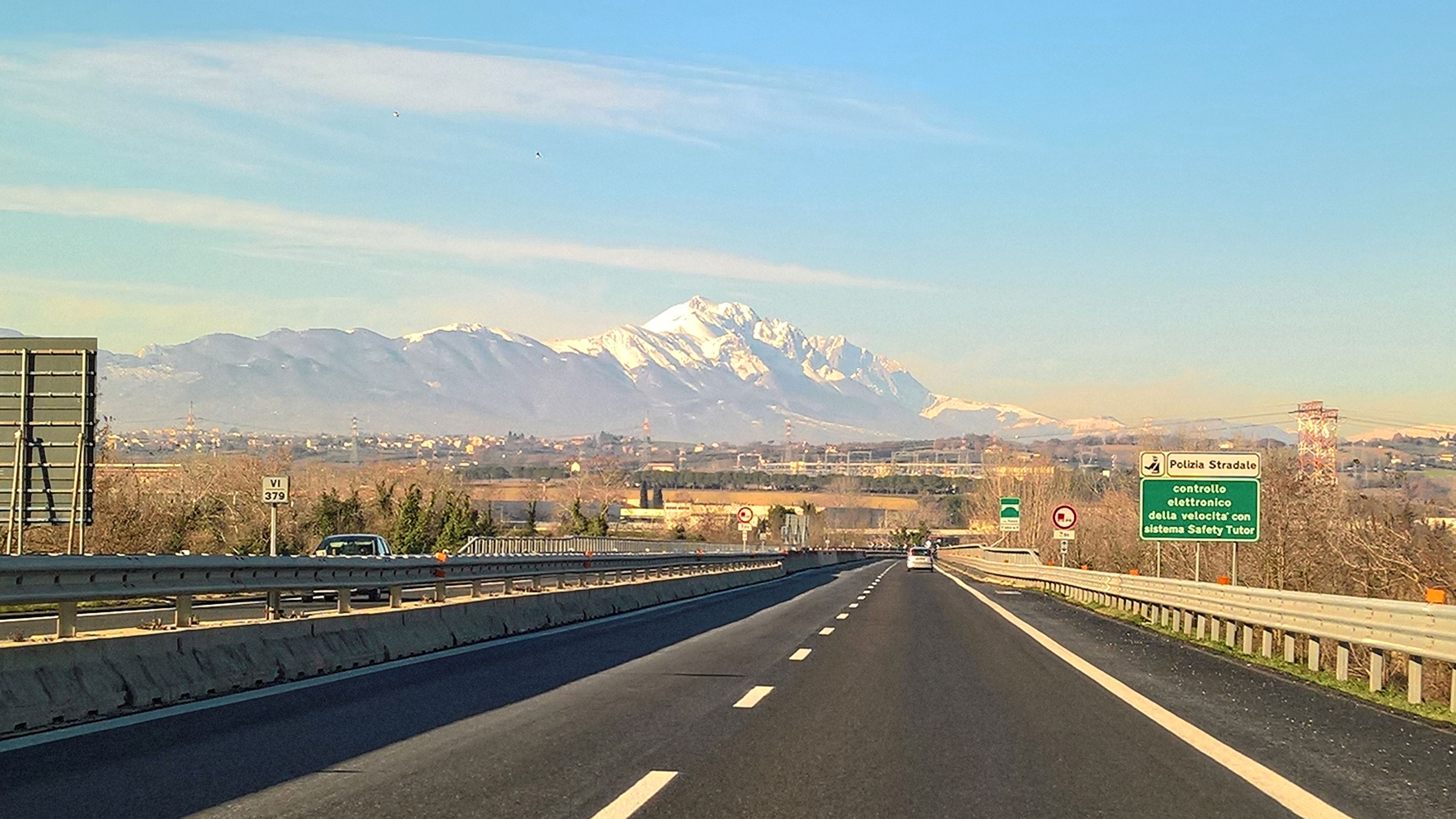
E55 near Pescara, Italy

=== Sweden ===
- Helsingborg

=== Ferry ===
- (Sweden) Helsingborg – (Denmark) Helsingør, the HH Ferry route

=== Denmark ===
E55 has no other national road number, so exits and service areas are listed in this article

==== Exits and service areas in Denmark ====
- 3 Espergærde
- 4 Kvistgård
- 5 Humlebæk
- 6 Nivå
- 7 Kokkedal
- 9 Hørsholm C
- | Isterød
- 10 Hørsholm S
- 12 Vedbæk
- 13 Gl. Holte
- 14 Nærum
- | Lærkereden/Storkereden
- 15 Lundtofte
- 16 Lyngby C
- Kgs. Lyngby Primærrute 19 Copenhagen
- 17 Jægersborgvej
- 18 Nyborgvej
- 19 Buddinge
- Gladsaxe Primærrute 16 Hillerød Primærrute 16 Copenhagen
- 20 Gladsaxe
- 21 Frederikssundvej
- 23 Jyllingevej
- Rødovre Primærrute 17 Frederikssund, Ring 4 Ballerup
- 24 Roskildevej
- Brøndby Primærrute 21 Roskilde Primærrute 21 Copenhagen
- Avedøre E20 Malmö
- 25 Vallensbæk S
- 26 Ishøj Strand
- Ishøj Ring 4 Ballerup, Primærrute 21 Ishøj, Copenhagen V
- 27 Greve N
- 28 Greve C
- 29 Greve S
- | Karlslunde
- 30 Solrød N
- 31 Solrød S Primærrute 6 Roskilde
- 32 Køge
- Køge Vest E20 Odense
- 33 Lellinge
- 34 Herfølge
- 35 Haslev
- | Piberhus
- 36 Bregentved
- Næstved Primærrute 54 Næstved (planned 2033)
- 37 Rønnede Primærrute 54
- 38 Tappernøje |
- 39 Bårse
- 40 Udby
- 41 Vordingborg
- Northern Farø bridge
- 42 Farø
- Southern Farø bridge
- 43 Nørre Alslev
- 44 Eskilstrup E47 Nykøbing F, Gedser
- Nykøbing F Ø

=== Ferry ===
- (Denmark) Gedser – (Germany) Rostock

=== Germany ===
- A 19: Rostock – Wittstock/Dosse ( E20)
- A 24: Wittstock/Dosse – Oberkrämer, Kremmen ( E26)
- A 10: Oberkrämer, Kremmen - Schönefeld ( E30)
- A 13: Schönefeld – Dresden
- A 4: Dresden ( E40)
- A 17: Dresden – near Geising

=== Czech Republic ===
- D8: Petrovice – Ústí nad Labem – Trmice (Start of Concurrency with E 442) – Řehlovice (end of concurrency with E 442 – Prague
- D0: Prague( E48), E50), E59), E65), E67)
- D1: Prague - Mirošovice
- I/3: Mirošovice - Mezno
- D3: Mezno – Tábor – České Budějovice ( E49), E53) – Dolní Dvořiště

=== Austria ===
- B 310: Leopoldschlag – Freistadt
- S 10: Freistadt – Unterweitersdorf
- A 7: Unterweitersdorf – Linz – Ansfelden
- A 1: Ansfelden (Start of Concurrency with E60, E552) – Sattledt(End of Concurrency with E552) – Salzburg (End of Concurrency with E60), ( E52), ( E641)
- A 10: Salzburg – Spittal an der Drau (Start of Concurrency with E66) – Villach, (End of Concurrency with E66), ( E61)
- A 2: Villach – Arnoldstein

=== Italy ===
- A 23: Tarvisio – Udine – Palmanova
- A 4: Palmanova (Start of Concurrency with) - Quarto d'Altino (End of Concurrency with)
- A 57: Quarto d'Altino – Venice
- SS 309: Venice – Ravenna
- SS 3bis: Ravenna – Cesena
- A 14: Cesena – Rimini – Fano – Ancona – Pescara – Canosa di Puglia – Bari
- SS 96: Bari
- SS 16: Bari – Fasano
- SS 379: Fasano – Brindisi(

=== Ferry ===
- (Italy) Brindisi – (Greece) Igoumenitsa

=== Greece ===
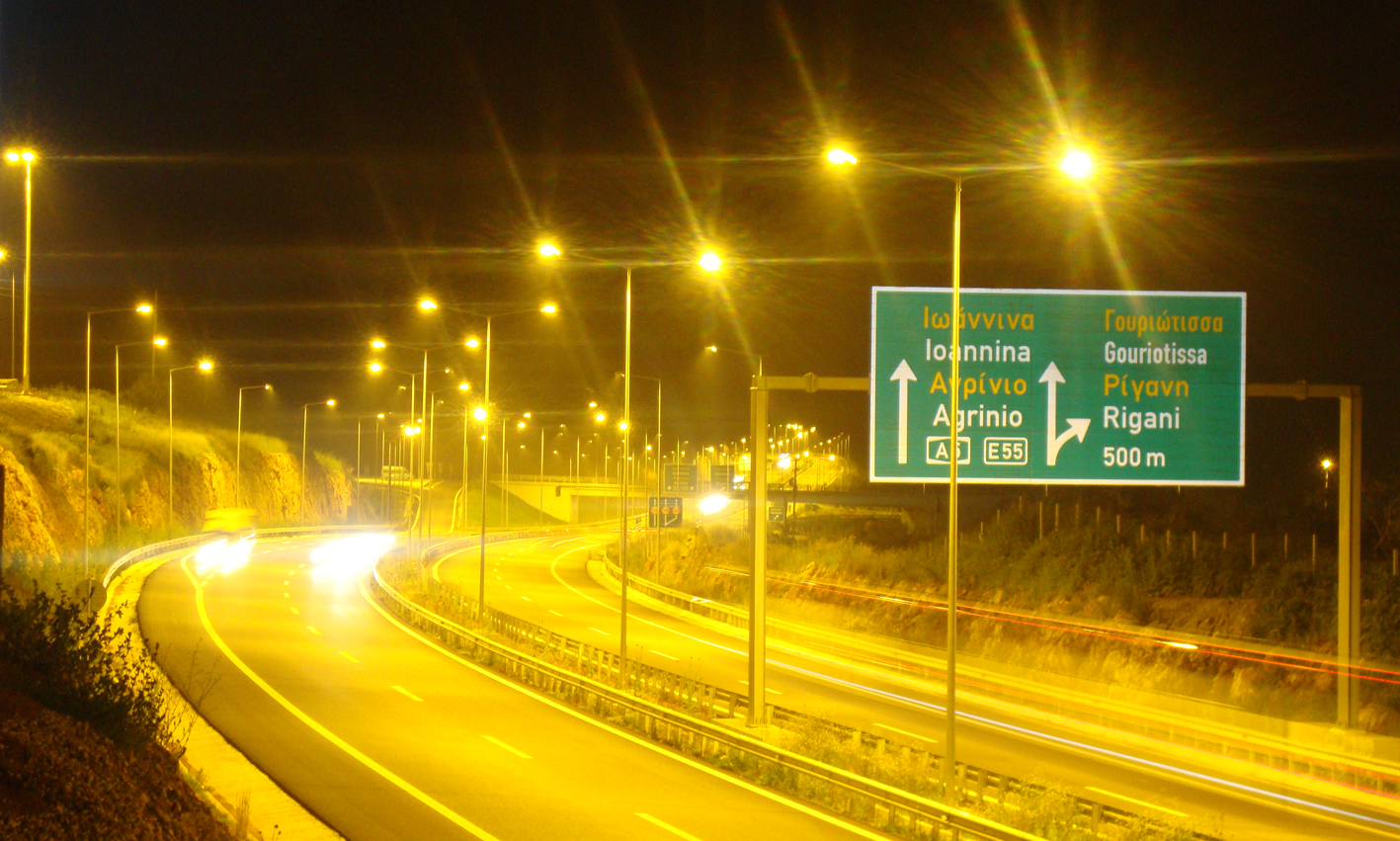
E55 near Agrinio, Greece

The E55 in Greece currently runs from Igoumenitsa in the west to Kalamata in the south, via Preveza, Missolonghi, Rio, Patras and Pyrgos. In relation to the national road network, the E55 currently follows (in order, from west to south):

- EO19 (formerly the EO18): Nea Thesi – Preveza
- A52: Preveza – Lake Amvrakia
- A5: Lake Amvrakia – Pyrgos
- EO9: Pyrgos – Kalo Nero
- EO9α: Kalo Nero – Tsakona
- A7: Tsakona – Kalamata
- EO82: within Kalamata

The E55 runs concurrently with the E65 on the Rio–Antirrio Bridge and the A7 segment, the E952 on the A52 segment, and the E951 and E952 on part of the A5 between Lake Amvrakia and Kouvaras. The E55 also connects with the E90 at Igoumenitsa.
