= List of E-roads in Germany =

European routes in Germany
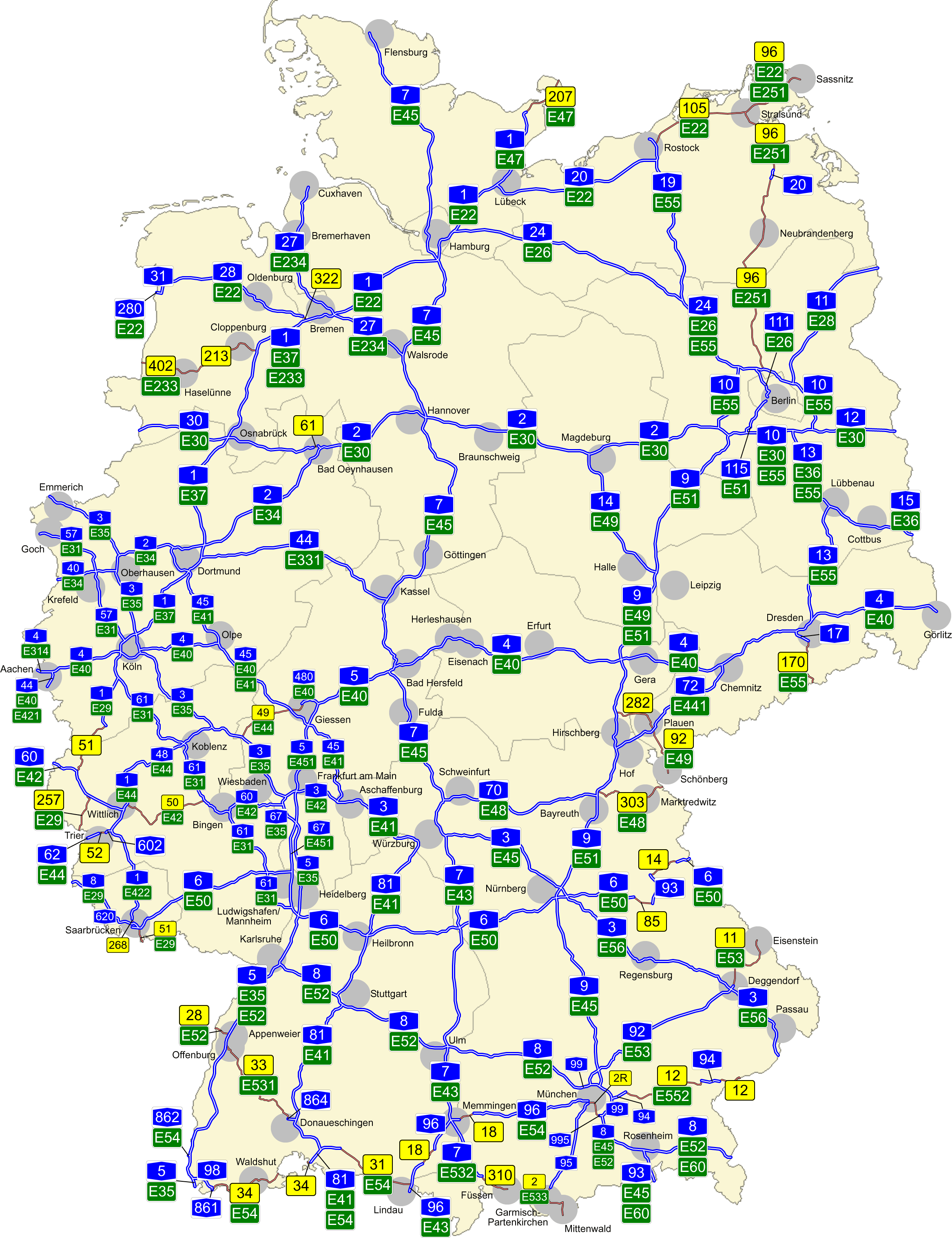
- European routes in Germany highlighted in blue

System information
- Maintained by Bundesministerium für Verkehr und digitale Infrastruktur

Highway names
- European routes: European route E nn (E nn)

System links
- International E-road network; A Class; B Class

== Class-A European routes ==
| Number | Length (mi) | Length (km) | Southern or western terminus | Northern or eastern terminus | Formed | Removed | Notes |
|---|---|---|---|---|---|---|---|
| E22 | — | — | Dutch border near Bunde | Ferry crossing to Sweden at Sassnitz | — | — | Planned to be rerouted over A 20 between Lübeck and Westerstede |
| E26 | 283 | 176 | A 24 in Hamburg | A 100 in Berlin | — | — | Concurrent with A 24 from Munich to A 10, A 10 from A 24 to A 111, and A 111 from A 10 to Berlin; was E28 before 1980 |
| E28 | — | — | A 10 in Berlin | Polish border near Nadrensee | — | — | Concurrent with A 11; was E74 from 1950-1975 and E26 from 1975-1980 |
| E29 | — | — | — | — | — | — | |
| E30 | — | — | Dutch border near Bad Bentheim | Polish border near Königs Wusterhausen | — | — | |
| E31 | — | — | Dutch border near Goch | Hockenheim | — | — | |
| E34 | — | — | Bad Oeynhausen | Dutch border near Hapert | — | — | |
| E35 | — | — | Swiss border | Dutch border near Emmerich am Rhein | — | — | |
| E36 | — | — | Polish border at Forst | Berlin | — | — | |
| E37 | 336 | 209 | Cologne | Bremen | — | — | Concurrent with A 1 |
| E40 | — | — | Belgian border near Aachen | Polish border near Görlitz | — | — | Concurrent with A 44, A 4, A 45, A 480, A 5, and A 4 |
| E41 | — | — | Swiss border near Singen | Dortmund | — | — | |
| E42 | — | — | Belgian border near Wittlich | Aschaffenburg | — | — | |
| E43 | — | — | Austrian border | Würzburg | — | — | Concurrent with A 7 and A 96 |
| E44 | — | — | Giessen | Luxembourgian border | — | — | |
| E45 | 1022 | 635 | Austrian border | Danish border | — | — | Concurrent with A 7, A 3, A 9, A 99, A 3 and A 93 |
| E47 | — | — | Lübeck | Ferry to Denmark | — | — | Concurrent with A 1 and B 207 |
| E48 | — | — | Czech border | Schweinfurt | — | — | |
| E49 | — | — | Czech border | Magdeburg | — | — | |
| E50 | — | — | French border | Czech border | — | — | |
| E51 | 479 | 298 | Nuremberg | Berlin | — | — | |
| E52 | — | — | French border | Austrian border | — | — | |
| E53 | — | — | Munich | Czech border | — | — | |
| E54 | — | — | — | — | — | — | |
| E55 | — | — | Czech border | Ferry to Denmark | — | — | |
| E56 | — | — | Austrian border | Nuremberg | — | — | |
| E60 | — | — | Austrian border | Austrian border | — | — | |

== Class-B European routes ==
| Number | Length (mi) | Length (km) | Southern or western terminus | Northern or eastern terminus | Formed | Removed | Notes |
|---|---|---|---|---|---|---|---|
| E233 | 91 | 57 | A37 at Dutch border | A1 near Emstek | — | — | Was E232 before 1987 |
| E234 | 162 | 101 | B 73 at Cuxhaven | A 7 at Walsrode | — | — | Concurrent with A 27; was E233 before 1987 |
| E251 | 281 | 175 | A 10 near Berlin | L 29/ B 96 near Sassnitz | — | — | Concurrent with B 96 and E22 to Süderholz, A 20 from Süderholz to Glienke and B 96 from Glienke to Berlin |
| E314 | — | — | A76 at Dutch border | A4 near Aachen | — | — | |
| E331 | — | — | A 44 near Dortmund | A 7 near Kassel | — | — | Concurrent with A 44 |
| E422 | 59 | 37 | A 602/A 1 near Trier | A1/B 268 near Saarbrücken | — | — | Concurrent with A 1 |
| E441 | 106 | 66 | A 9 west of Hof | A 4 near Chemnitz | — | — | Concurrent with A 72 |
| E451 | 144 | 89 | A 480/A 5 east of Giessen (AD Reiskirchener) | A 6/A 67 northeast of Mannheim (AD Viernheimer) | — | — | Concurrent with A 5 from Giessen to Darmstadt and A 67 from Darmstadt to Mannheim |
| E531 | 89 | 55 | A 5 west of Offenburg | B 33/A 864 north of Donaueschingen (AD Bad Dürrheim) | — | — | Concurrent with B 33a from A 5 to Offenburg, B 3 from Offenburg to B 33 and B 33 from B 3 to A 864 |
| E532 | — | — | Austrian border at Füssen | A 96/A 7 at Memmingen | — | — | Concurrent with A 7 |
| E533 | — | — | B 2 in Munich | Austrian border south of Mittenwald | — | — | Concurrent with A 95 from Munich to Eschenlohe and B 2 from Eschenlohe to Austrian border |
| E552 | — | — | Austrian border at Simbach am Inn | A 99 in Munich | — | — | Concurrent with A 94 from Munich to Forstinning, B 12 from Forstinning to Heldenstein, A 94 from Heldenstein to Burghausen, B 12 from Burghausen to Austrian border; planned to be rerouted on A 94 |
| E641 | 35 | 22 | Austrian border near Melleck | Austrian border near the A 8 | — | — | Concurrent with B 21 |
