= Mirošovice =

- Municipality
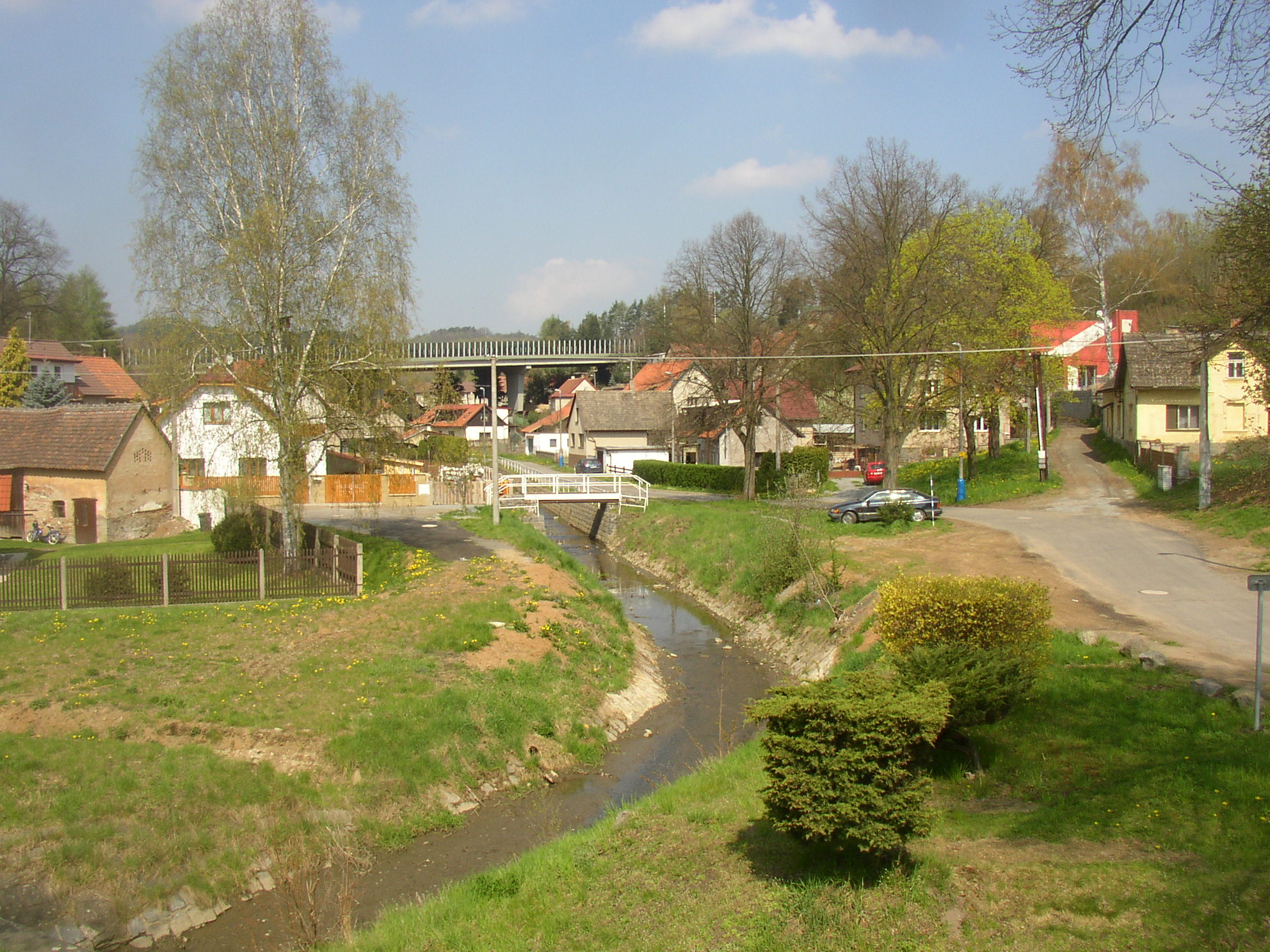
- Kunický stream in Mirošovice

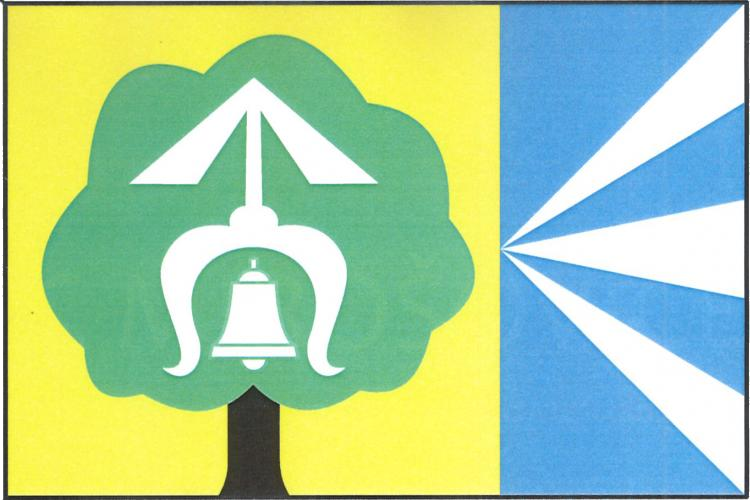
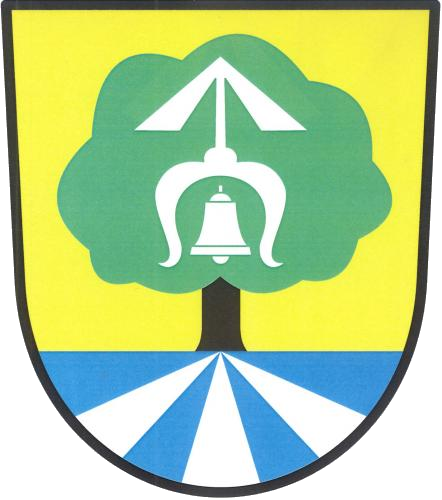
- Flag Coat of arms

- Location in the Czech Republic
- Coordinates: 49°54′36″N 14°42′41″E
- Country: Czech Republic
- Region: Central Bohemian
- District: Prague-East
- First mentioned: 1250

Area
  - Total: 5.37 km^{2} (2.07 sq mi)
- Elevation: 334 m (1,096 ft)

Population (2026-01-01)
  - Total: 1,531
  - Density: 285/km^{2} (738/sq mi)
- Time zone: UTC+1 (CET)
  - Summer (DST): UTC+2 (CEST)
- Postal code: 251 66
- Website: www.mirosovice.cz

Mirošovice is a municipality and village in Prague-East District in the Central Bohemian Region of the Czech Republic. It has about 1,500 inhabitants.

== Etymology ==
The name is derived from the personal name Miroš, meaning "the village of Miroš's people".

== Geography ==
Mirošovice is located about 19 kilometres (12 mi) southeast of Prague. It lies in the Benešov Uplands. The highest point is at 415 m (1,362 ft) above sea level. The stream Kunický potok flows through the municipality.

== History ==
The first written mention of Mirošovice is from 1250.

== Demographics ==
Historical population

Year	Pop.	±%
1869	408	—
1880	357	−12.5%
1890	403	+12.9%
1900	415	+3.0%
1910	423	+1.9%

Year	Pop.	±%
1921	436	+3.1%
1930	712	+63.3%
1950	744	+4.5%
1961	777	+4.4%
1970	757	−2.6%

Year	Pop.	±%
1980	728	−3.8%
1991	780	+7.1%
2001	824	+5.6%
2011	1,186	+43.9%
2021	1,465	+23.5%

Source: Censuses

== Transport ==
The D1 motorway runs through the municipality. The I/3 road (part of European route E55) separates from it in Mirošovice.

Mirošovice is located on the railway line Prague–Benešov.

== Sights ==
The only cultural monument in the municipality are the fragments of the Ježov Castle, located at the southern municipal border. It is a torso of a medieval castle which stood here from the 13th to the 15th century.
