= European route E533 =

Road in trans-European E-road network

E533

Route information
- Length: 151 km (94 mi)

Major junctions
- From: Munich (Germany)
- Garmisch-Partenkirchen; Mittenwald; Seefeld in Tirol (Austria)
- To: Innsbruck (Austria)

Location
- Countries: Germany; Austria

Highway system
- International E-road network; A Class; B Class

E 533 is a European B class road in Germany and Austria, connecting the cities Munich — Garmisch-Partenkirchen — Mittenwald — Seefeld in Tirol — Innsbruck.

== Route and E-road junctions ==
- Germany (on shared signage A 95 then B 2)
  - Munich: E45, E52, E53, E54, E552
  - Garmisch-Partenkirchen
  - Mittenwald
- Austria (on shared signage B 177 then A 12)
  - Seefeld in Tirol
  - Innsbruck: E45, E60
