= European route E641 =

Road in trans-European E-road network

E641

Route information
- Length: 106 km (66 mi)

Major junctions
- From: Wörgl
- Sankt Johann in Tirol, Lofer
- To: Salzburg

Location
- Countries: Austria, Germany

Highway system
- International E-road network; A Class; B Class

European route E 641 is a secondary E-road in Austria and Germany.

It starts at Wörgl, Austria, where it is connected with European route E 45 and E 60 (Austrian autobahn A12).

- In Austria, it passes through Sankt Johann in Tirol and Lofer as federal highway B178
- In Germany, it passes through Bad Reichenhall as federal highway B 21

The route then enters Austria again, ending in Salzburg, where it is connected with E 52, E 55 and E 60.

European route E 641 is 105 km (65 mi) long, with about 35 km (22 mi) in Germany, and 70 km (43 mi) in Austria.

== Route ==
- Austria
  - E45, E60 Wörgl
  - Sankt Johann in Tirol
  - Lofer
- Germany
  - Bad Reichenhall
- Austria
  - E55, E60, E52 Salzburg
