= Sauerlach =

- Municipality
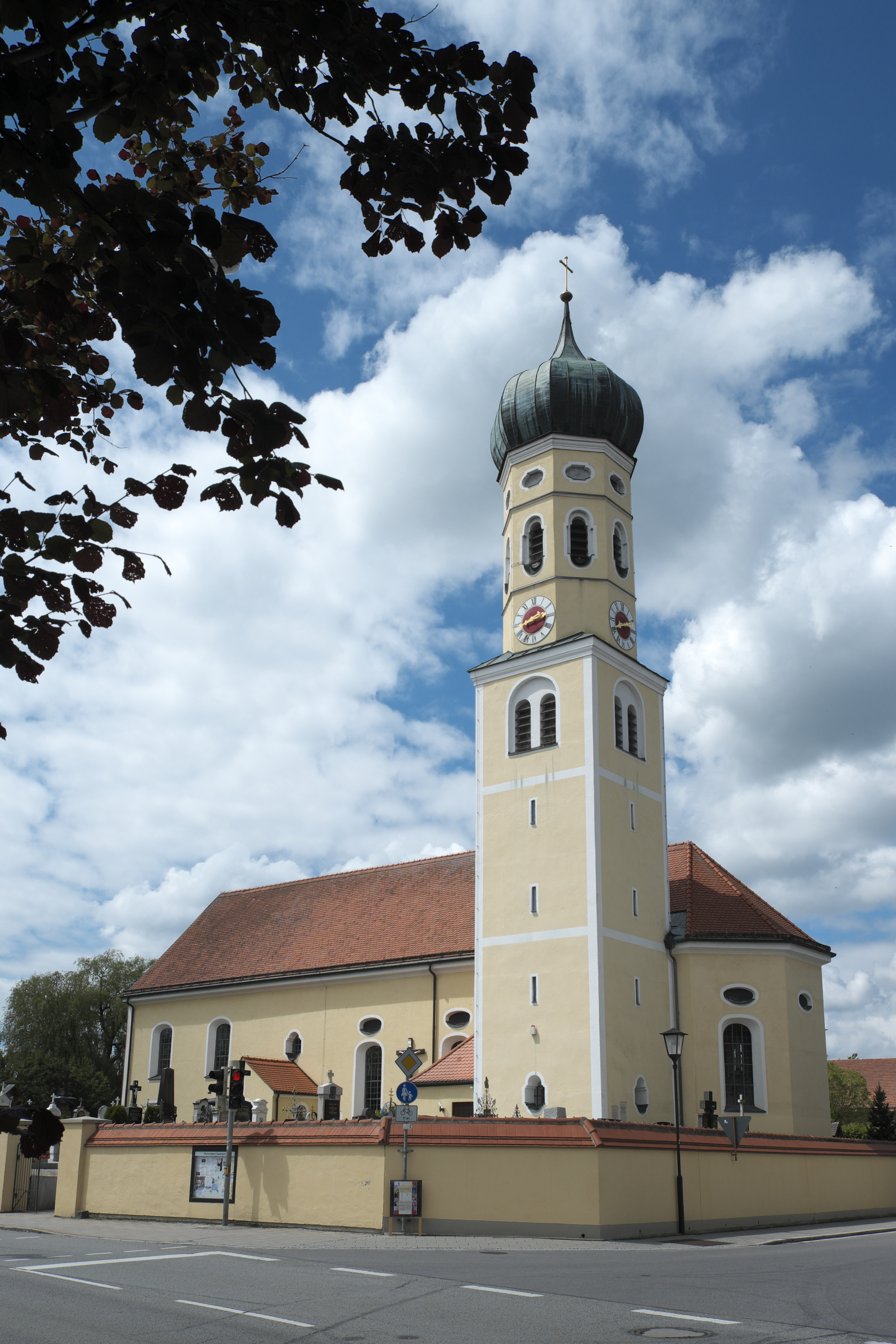
- Church of Saint Andrew

- Coat of arms

- Location of Sauerlach within Munich district
- Interactive map of Sauerlach
- Location within Germany Location within Bavaria
- Coordinates: 47°58′N 11°39′E
- Country: Germany
- State: Bavaria
- Admin. region: Upper Bavaria
- District: Munich

Government
  - Mayor (2020–26): Barbara Bogner

Area
  - Total: 56.95 km^{2} (21.99 sq mi)
- Elevation: 618 m (2,028 ft)

Population (2025-12-31)
  - Total: 7,991
  - Density: 140.3/km^{2} (363.4/sq mi)
- Time zone: UTC+01:00 (CET)
  - Summer (DST): UTC+02:00 (CEST)
- Postal codes: 82054
- Dialling codes: 08104
- Vehicle registration: M
- Website: www.sauerlach.de

Sauerlach (German pronunciation: [ˈzaʊɐlax]) is a municipality in the district of Munich in Bavaria in Germany.

== Infrastructure ==
Sauerlach benefits from proximity to Munich via the S-Bahn line S3. The municipality also hosts a geothermal power plant.
