= European route E56 =

Road in trans-European E-road network

E56

Route information
- Length: 330 km (210 mi)

Major junctions
- North-West end: Nuremberg, Germany
- South-East end: Sattledt, Austria

Location
- Countries: Germany; Austria

Highway system
- International E-road network; A Class; B Class

European route E 56 is a road that is part of the International E-road network. It begins in Nuremberg, Germany and ends in Sattledt, Austria.

The E56 runs through: Nuremberg - Regensburg - Deggendorf - Passau - Ried - Wels - Sattledt.
