= European route E552 =

Road in trans-European E-road network

E552

Route information
- Length: 243 km (151 mi)

Major junctions
- From: Munich
- Braunau am Inn; Wels
- To: Linz

Location
- Countries: Germany; Austria

Highway system
- International E-road network; A Class; B Class

E 552 is a B-class European route connecting Munich in Germany to Linz in Austria. The route is approximately 243 km long.

== Route and E-road junctions ==
- Germany (on shared signage A 94 then B 12)
  - Munich: E45, E52, E53, E54, E533
  - Neuötting
  - Simbach am Inn (near Austrian border)
- Austria (on shared signage B 148 (a Landesstraße) then A 8 then A 25)
  - Braunau am Inn (near German border)
  - Wels
  - Linz: E55, E60
