= Sattledt =

- Municipality
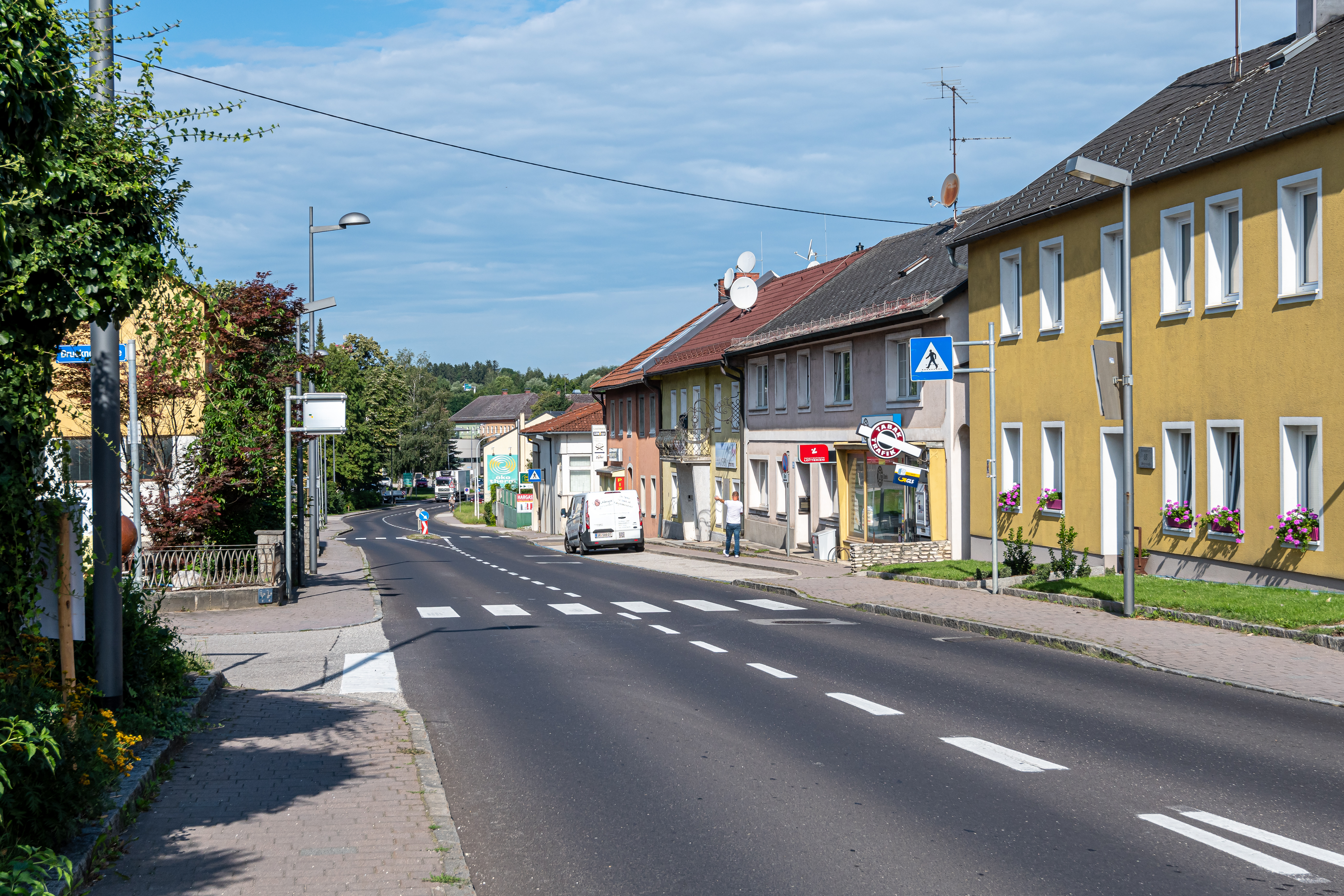

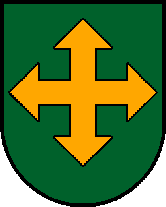
- Coat of arms

- Location within Austria
- Coordinates: 48°04′24″N 14°03′27″E
- Country: Austria
- State: Upper Austria
- District: Wels-Land

Government
  - Mayor: Gerhard Huber (ÖVP)

Area
  - Total: 22.16 km^{2} (8.56 sq mi)
- Elevation: 400 m (1,300 ft)

Population (2018-01-01)
  - Total: 2,668
  - Density: 120.4/km^{2} (311.8/sq mi)
- Time zone: UTC+1 (CET)
  - Summer (DST): UTC+2 (CEST)
- Postal code: 4642
- Area code: 07244
- Vehicle registration: WL
- Website: www.sattledt.at

Sattledt is a municipality in the district of Wels-Land in the Austrian state of Upper Austria.

== Population ==
Historical population
Year	Pop.	±%
1869	1,014	—
1880	998	−1.6%
1890	972	−2.6%
1900	978	+0.6%
1910	1,147	+17.3%
1923	1,225	+6.8%
1934	1,286	+5.0%
1939	1,450	+12.8%
1951	1,806	+24.6%
1961	1,630	−9.7%
1971	1,810	+11.0%
1981	1,971	+8.9%
1991	2,176	+10.4%
2001	2,241	+3.0%
2010	2,327	+3.8%

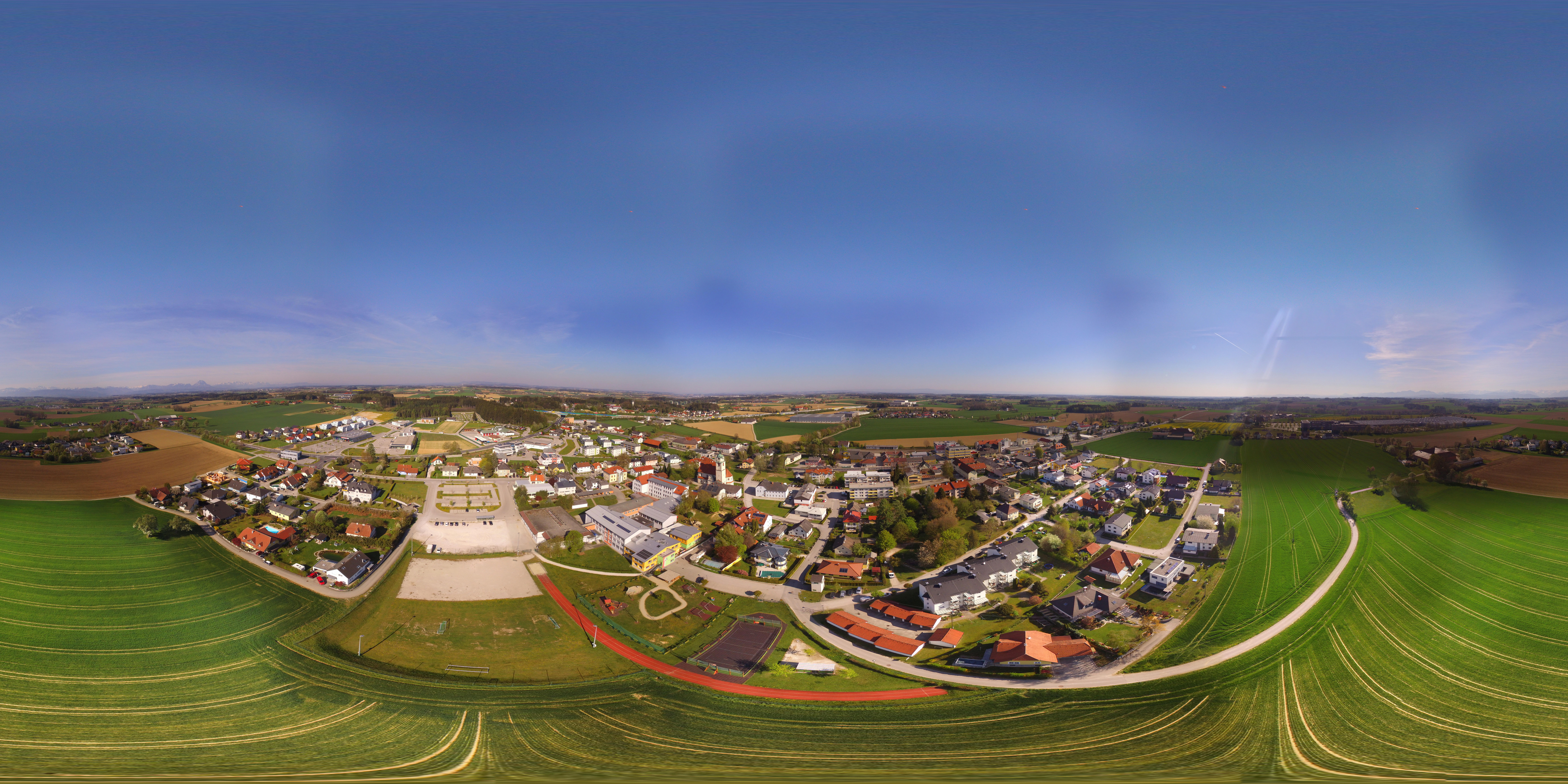
360° airborne panorama of the center of Sattledt (view as a 360° interactive panorama)

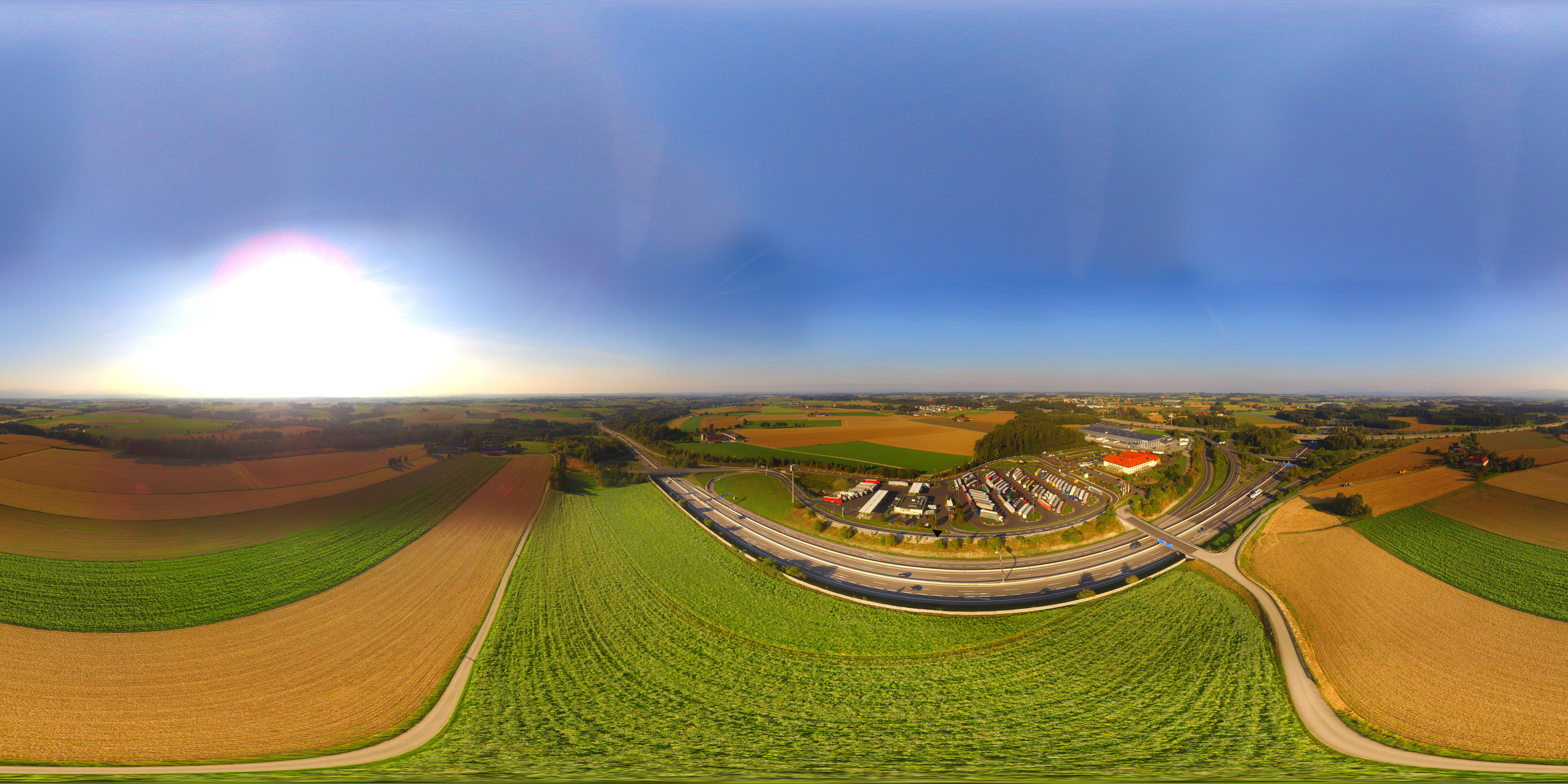
360° airborne panorama, shot northwest of motorway junction Voralpenkreuz (view as a 360° interactive panorama)
