= Bundesautobahn 94 =

Federal motorway in Germany

A 94
- Bundesautobahn 94

Route information
- Length: 109 km (68 mi) 150 km planned

Location
- Country: Germany
- States: Bavaria

Highway system
- Roads in Germany; Autobahns; List; Federal; List; State; E-roads
← A 93	→ A 95

Bundesautobahn 94 (translates from German as Federal Motorway 94, short form Autobahn 94, abbreviated as BAB 94 or A 94) is an autobahn in southern Germany. When completed, it will connect Munich with Passau. Currently, only the parts Munich-Burghausen, and Malching-Kirchham have been built. Between Burghausen and Simbach am Inn, there is a 14 kilometer, two-lane section that is signed as Bundesstraße 12. Provisions for an upgrade to A 94 exist here.

The route between Forstinning and Heldenstein was the subject of a decades-long debate.

== History ==
In the original plans for the A 94, the section between Simbach and Passau was not planned. Instead, the A 94 was supposed to cross the Inn to the Austrian border, at which point it would continue through the Innviertel to Ried im Innkreis and connect to the Austrian A 8 towards Vienna. This path would have decreased travel time from Munich to Vienna compared to the route via Salzburg. Provisions for such a routing were built in Simbach and in Ried. However, since Austria did not want to burden the Innviertel with traffic, the plan was given up on the Austrian side. After this, on the German side, the plans were changed so that the A 94 connected with the A 3 at Pocking/Neuhaus am Inn. This makes an eventual northern extension to the Czech border possible.

At one point, a route from Mühldorf to Pfarrkirchen to Pocking was planned. Under this plan, today's A 94 section from Mühldorf to Simbach would have been given the designation A 942.
