= Bundesautobahn 8 =

Federal motorway in Germany

Coordinates: 48.09459°N 11.61461°E

A 8
- Bundesautobahn 8

Route information
- Length: 497 km (309 mi)

Major junctions
- West end: Luxembourg A13 motorway
- East end: Austrian West Autobahn near Salzburg

Location
- Country: Germany
- States: Saarland, Rhineland-Palatinate, Baden-Württemberg, Bavaria

Highway system
- Roads in Germany; Autobahns; List; Federal; List; State; E-roads
← A 7	→ A 9

Bundesautobahn 8 (translates from German as Federal Motorway 8, short form Autobahn 8, abbreviated as BAB 8 or A 8) is an autobahn in southern Germany that runs 497 km (309 mi) from the Luxembourg A13 motorway at Schengen via Neunkirchen, Pirmasens, Karlsruhe, Pforzheim, Stuttgart, Ulm, Augsburg and Munich to the Austrian West Autobahn near Salzburg.

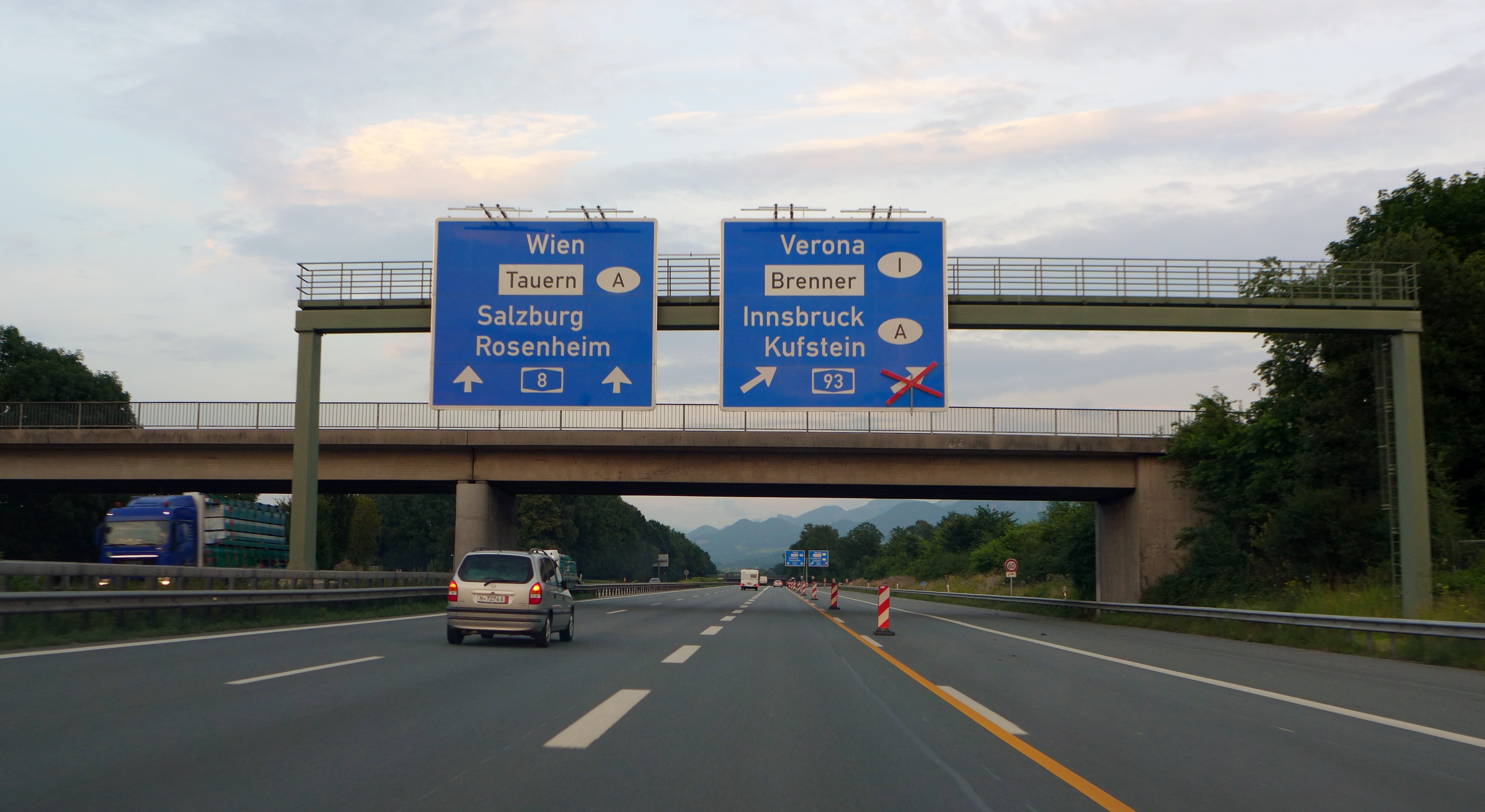
BAB 93 junction near Rosenheim

The A8 is a significant east–west transit route. Its construction began in March 1934 during Nazi rule as a Reichsautobahn, the section between Karlsruhe and Salzburg having been completed by the time road works were discontinued in World War II. Although most parts have been modernized and extended since, significant sections remain in their original configuration from the 1930s - 2+2 lanes, no emergency lanes, steep hills, and tight curves. In combination with today's traffic, this makes the A8 one of the most crowded and dangerous autobahns in Germany. Especially in winter, the slopes of the Black Forest, the Swabian Alb near Aichelberg, as well as the Irschenberg become bottlenecks when heavy trucks traverse the A8 uphill.

As of 2016, the following sections have three lanes in each direction of travel: Karlsruhe - Pforzheim-North, Pforzheim-South - Stuttgart - Mühlhausen, AK Ulm/Elchingen - Augsburg - Munich-Eschenried, and AK Munich-South - AD Inntal. Other sections in Saarland, Rhineland-Palatinate, and Munich have two lanes in each direction of travel and follow current Autobahn standards.

As of 2016, the following sections have sections which are either incomplete or do not comply with modern Autobahn standards: near Merzig (under construction), AK Neunkirchen - Zweibrücken (no emergency lanes yet), Enz crossing near Pforzheim (modernizing planned), Alb crossing Mühlhausen - Hohenstadt (planned), Hohenstadt - Ulm-West (under construction), Ulm-West - AK Ulm/Elchingen (planned), and AD Inntal - Salzburg (planned). At least, the complete section Karlsruhe - Salzburg will be extended to 3 + 3 lanes.

In 2021, widening from 4 to 6 lanes commenced east of Pforzheim (Enz crossing). This involves replacing 7 bridges and constructing a new green bridge for nature. Completion is due in 2026, with a cost of 100million euros +.

== Incomplete ==
Plans for the section between Pirmasens and Karlsruhe were abandoned in the 1980s. Instead of this, the B10 from Pirmasens to Landau is being widened. This is not completed as of early 2021. Also, the Landau - Karlsruhe section was built as a part of A65 in the 90s. In Munich, there is also a gap: the section from Augsburg ends in Munich-Obermenzing and the section from Salzburg ends in Munich-Ramersdorf. Transit traffic has to use the A99 north around Munich or the A995 west, "Mittlerer Ring" and A995 (shorter but incomplete autobahn)

== Along the route ==
Near Merzig, there used to be a section with only one lane in each direction, but it has been rebuilt as 2+2 lanes with hard shoulders.

Near Heusweiler, wire netting was built over the autobahn as a faraday cage to protect vehicle electronics from radiation from Heusweiler high high-powered radio transmitter. The transmitter no longer operates, and the wires have been removed as of 2020.

Pirmasens-Winzeln is one of only four "left slip roads" in the German autobahn network: coming from Zweibrücken, the left lane is the exit to Winzeln and the right lane stays on the A8; access from Winzeln leads to the left lane. In the direction towards Zweibrücken, the exit and entry are normal. An interchange between the A8 and A62 was planned here, but following the cancellation of the A8 Pirmasens - Karlsruhe section, the "interchange" was used for the Winzeln exit.

In Gruibingen (Stuttgart - Ulm section), Gruibingen motorway services was built according to feng shui philosophy.

At Drakensteiner Hang, between Mühlhausen im Täle and Hohenstadt (Stuttgart - Ulm section), the A8 is divided into separate northbound and southbound routes on either side of the peak.

Near Adelsried (Ulm - Munich section) is the Autobahnkirche ("motorway church") Maria, Schutz der Reisenden ("Mary, patron saint of travellers"). It was built in 1956 as the first of 42 motorway churches in Germany.

For the expansion of the Ulm/Elchingen - Augsburg - Munich section, a new kind of financial funding was used, an operator model: consortia of constructing companies funded the work themselves, and in return, they receive lorry road charges for 30 years. They are also responsible for maintenance during this period.

For transit traffic around Munich is signposted to use the orbital motorway A99 north/east at Eschenried and Munich-South interchanges. But those familiar with the area often use A99 west - Mittlerer Ring - A995 as a shorter route, which can be faster if the traffic is light. However, this route is narrower and leads through Munich, so it is more congested; therefore, the authorities want to keep transit traffic out of town.

Austria charges tolls for use of its autobahns, so many drivers who do not want to pay for the short section to the border near Salzburg use the Bad Reichenhall or Schwarzbach exits, which sometimes causes traffic jams on the local country roads.
