= European route E53 =

Road in trans-European E-road network

E53

Route information
- Length: 285 km (177 mi)

Major junctions
- North end: Plzeň, Czech Republic
- South end: Munich, Germany

Location
- Countries: Czech Republic; Germany

Highway system
- International E-road network; A Class; B Class

European route E53 forms part of the International E-road network. It runs from Plzeň, Czech Republic to Munich, Germany.

Its route is: Plzeň – Deggendorf – Landshut – Munich.
