= Bundesstraße 14 =

Federal highway in Germany

B 14
- Bundesstraße 14

Route information
- Length: 464 km (288 mi)

Location
- Country: Germany
- States: Baden-Württemberg, Bavaria

Highway system
- Roads in Germany; Autobahns; List; Federal; List; State; E-roads

Bundesstraße 14 (abbr. B14) is a German federal road. It connects Stockach in Baden-Württemberg with Rozvadov in the Czech Republic. The biggest towns along this road are Stuttgart and Nuremberg.

Wide parts of today's Bundesstraße 14 date back to medieval or even older trade routes. The stretch from Nuremberg to Prague was once known als Goldene Straße (″Golden Road″)

== Junction lists ==
Legend:

- I/C - Interchange, I/S - Intersection, RSA - Rest and service area, OBR - Overhead bridge restaurant, R/R - Restaurant and rest plaza, L/B - Layby, V/P - Vista point, TN - tunnel, T/P - Toll plaza, BR - Bridge

State	District	km	Exit	Name	Destinations	Notes
Baden-Württemberg	Konstanz			Stockach	B 313	
Baden-Württemberg	Konstanz			Upper Danube Nature Park (Naturpark Obere Donau)		
Baden-Württemberg	Tuttlingen			Emmingen-Liptingen		
Baden-Württemberg	Tuttlingen			Talhof	B 491	
Baden-Württemberg	Tuttlingen			Witthoh		
Baden-Württemberg	Tuttlingen		TN	Kreuzstraße Tunnel		948 m
Baden-Württemberg	Tuttlingen			Tuttlingen-Ost	B 311	
Baden-Württemberg	Tuttlingen		BR	Danube		
Baden-Württemberg	Tuttlingen			Tuttlingen	B 523	
Baden-Württemberg	Tuttlingen			Swabian Jura		
Baden-Württemberg	Tuttlingen		RSA	Parking area (both directions)		
Baden-Württemberg	Tuttlingen			Wurmlingen local diversion		
Baden-Württemberg	Tuttlingen			Rietheim-Weilheim		
Baden-Württemberg	Tuttlingen			Balgheim		
Baden-Württemberg	Tuttlingen			Spaichingen		
Baden-Württemberg	Tuttlingen			Aldingen		
Baden-Württemberg	Rottweil			Rottweil-Neufra		
Baden-Württemberg	Rottweil			Kraftfahrstraße		
Baden-Württemberg	Rottweil			Rottweil-Süd	B 27	
Baden-Württemberg	Rottweil			diversion around Rottweil together with the B 27		
Baden-Württemberg	Rottweil		BR	Neckar		
Baden-Württemberg	Rottweil			Rottweil-Bühlingen		
Baden-Württemberg	Rottweil		RSA	Parking area (both directions)		
Baden-Württemberg	Rottweil			Rottweil-West		
Baden-Württemberg	Rottweil			end of motor road		
Baden-Württemberg	Rottweil			Rottweil-Nord	B 462	
Baden-Württemberg	Rottweil		RSA	Parking area (westbound)		
Baden-Württemberg	Rottweil			diversion around Rottweil together with the B 27		
Baden-Württemberg	Rottweil			Rottweil-Nord	B 27	
Baden-Württemberg	Rottweil			under A 81 / E41		
Baden-Württemberg	Rottweil			Villingendorf local diversion		
Baden-Württemberg	Rottweil		RSA	Parking area (eastbound)		
Baden-Württemberg	Rottweil			Epfendorf		
Baden-Württemberg	Rottweil			Oberndorf		
Baden-Württemberg	Rottweil		RSA	Parking area (eastbound)		
Baden-Württemberg	Rottweil			Sulz		
Baden-Württemberg	Rottweil		BR	Neckar		
Baden-Württemberg	Rottweil			Sulz-Fischingen		
Baden-Württemberg	Freudenstadt		BR	Neckar		
Baden-Württemberg	Freudenstadt			Horb	B 32 / B 28a	
Baden-Württemberg	Freudenstadt			Naturpark Schwarzwald Mitte/Nord		
Baden-Württemberg	Freudenstadt			Eutingen	B 463	continues as B 28a
Baden-Württemberg	Freudenstadt			replaced by B 28a		
Baden-Württemberg	Freudenstadt			replaced by A 81 / E41		
Baden-Württemberg	Freudenstadt			replaced by B 28		
Baden-Württemberg	Böblingen			Herrenberg	B 28 / B 296	
Baden-Württemberg	Böblingen			Nufringen local diversion		
Baden-Württemberg	Böblingen			Gärtringen local diversion		
Baden-Württemberg	Böblingen		27	Gärtringen	A 81 / E41	
Baden-Württemberg	Böblingen			replaced by A 81 / A 831 / E41		
Baden-Württemberg	Stuttgart		1	Stuttgart-Vaihingen	continuation of A 831	
Baden-Württemberg	Stuttgart			Kraftfahrstraße		
Baden-Württemberg	Stuttgart		TN	Johannesgraben Tunnel		220 m
Baden-Württemberg	Stuttgart			Johannesgraben		3-way interchange
Baden-Württemberg	Stuttgart			University of Stuttgart		
Baden-Württemberg	Stuttgart			Leonberger Straße		
Baden-Württemberg	Stuttgart			End of motor road		
Baden-Württemberg	Stuttgart			Stuttgart		Start/end of city limit
Baden-Württemberg	Stuttgart		TN	Gäubahn Tunnel		291 m
Baden-Württemberg	Stuttgart		TN	Viereichenhau Tunnel		306 m
Baden-Württemberg	Stuttgart			Stuttgart-Heslach		
Baden-Württemberg	Stuttgart		TN	Heslach Tunnel		2300 m
Baden-Württemberg	Stuttgart			Stuttgart-Süd		
Baden-Württemberg	Stuttgart			Stuttgart-Mitte	B 27	
Baden-Württemberg	Stuttgart		TN	Canstatt Tunnel		
Baden-Württemberg	Stuttgart			Zentrum	B 10	
Baden-Württemberg	Stuttgart			together with the B 10 through Stuttgart		
Baden-Württemberg	Stuttgart			MHPArena		
Baden-Württemberg	Stuttgart			Kraftfahrstraße		
Baden-Württemberg	Stuttgart			Leuze Tunnel		280 m
Baden-Württemberg	Stuttgart			Stuttgart-Ost		
Baden-Württemberg	Stuttgart			Bad Cannstatt		
Baden-Württemberg	Stuttgart			together with the B 10 through Stuttgart		
Baden-Württemberg	Stuttgart			Untertürkheim	B 10	3-way interchange
Baden-Württemberg	Stuttgart		BR	Neckartalviadukt Untertürkheim; Neckar		1400 m
Baden-Württemberg	Stuttgart			Benzstraße		
Baden-Württemberg	Stuttgart			Stuttgart		Start/end of city limit
Baden-Württemberg	Rems-Murr-Kreis		TN	Tunnel Kappelberg		1585 m
Baden-Württemberg	Rems-Murr-Kreis			Fellbach		
Baden-Württemberg	Rems-Murr-Kreis			Waiblingen-Süd		
Baden-Württemberg	Rems-Murr-Kreis			Waiblingen	B 29	3-way interchange
Baden-Württemberg	Rems-Murr-Kreis		BR	Rems		
Baden-Württemberg	Rems-Murr-Kreis			Waiblingen-Mitte		
Baden-Württemberg	Rems-Murr-Kreis			Waiblingen-Nord		
Baden-Württemberg	Rems-Murr-Kreis		RSA	Rest area <- westbound		
Baden-Württemberg	Rems-Murr-Kreis		RSA	Rest area eastbound ->		
Baden-Württemberg	Rems-Murr-Kreis			Schwaikheim		
Baden-Württemberg	Rems-Murr-Kreis			Winnenden		
Baden-Württemberg	Rems-Murr-Kreis		BR	Zipfelbach (Talbrücke 465 m)		
Baden-Württemberg	Rems-Murr-Kreis			Winnenden-West		
Baden-Württemberg	Rems-Murr-Kreis		TN	Tunnel Leutenbach 1008 m		
Baden-Württemberg	Rems-Murr-Kreis			Nellmersbach		
Baden-Württemberg	Rems-Murr-Kreis			end of motor road		
Baden-Württemberg	Rems-Murr-Kreis		BR	Murr (Murrtalviadukt 403 m)		
Baden-Württemberg	Rems-Murr-Kreis			Backnang local diversion		
Baden-Württemberg	Rems-Murr-Kreis			Swabian-Franconian Forest Nature Park		
Baden-Württemberg	Rems-Murr-Kreis			Oppenweiler		
Baden-Württemberg	Rems-Murr-Kreis			Sulzbach an der Murr		
Baden-Württemberg	Rems-Murr-Kreis			Großerlach		
Baden-Württemberg	Schwäbisch Hall			Mainhardt B 39		
Baden-Württemberg	Schwäbisch Hall		RSA	eastbound -> parking area		
Baden-Württemberg	Schwäbisch Hall			Mainhardt-Bubenorbis		
Baden-Württemberg	Schwäbisch Hall			Michelfeld		
Baden-Württemberg	Schwäbisch Hall			Schwäbisch Hall start city limit		
Baden-Württemberg	Schwäbisch Hall			Heimbach	B 19	
Baden-Württemberg	Schwäbisch Hall			together with the B 19 in the direction of Untermünkheim		
Baden-Württemberg	Schwäbisch Hall		BR	Kocher		
Baden-Württemberg	Schwäbisch Hall			Gelbingen		
Baden-Württemberg	Schwäbisch Hall			Schwäbisch Hall end city limit		
Baden-Württemberg	Schwäbisch Hall			Untermünkheim		
Baden-Württemberg	Schwäbisch Hall			together with the B 19 in the direction of Schwäbisch Hall-Heimbach		
Baden-Württemberg	Schwäbisch Hall			Untermünkheim-Übrigshausen	B 19	
Baden-Württemberg	Schwäbisch Hall		43	Stuttgart-Degerloch	A 16 / E50	
Baden-Württemberg	Schwäbisch Hall			replaced by A 6 E50		
Bavaria	Ansbach		69	Aurach	A 6 / E50	
Bavaria	Ansbach		BR	Altmühl		
Bavaria	Ansbach			Neunstetten		
Bavaria	Ansbach			Ansbach	B 13	
Bavaria	Ansbach			Heilsbronn local diversion		
Bavaria	Ansbach			Heilsbronn-Müncherlbach		
Bavaria	Fürth			Roßtal-Buchschwabach		
Bavaria	Fürth			Roßtal-Großweismannsdorf		
Bavaria	Fürth			Stein		
Bavaria	Fürth		BR	Rednitz		
Bavaria	Nürnberg			Nürnberg start city limit		
Bavaria	Nürnberg			Röthenbach	B 2	
Bavaria	Nürnberg		BR	Main-Donau-Kanal		
Bavaria	Nürnberg			Südwesttangente		
Bavaria	Nürnberg			Schweinauer Hauptstraße	B 2	3-way interchange
Bavaria	Nürnberg			replaced by B 4 R		
Bavaria	Nürnberg			connecting to B 2 / B 4 / B 8		
Bavaria	Nürnberg			Erlenstegen		
Bavaria	Nürnberg			Nürnberg end city limit		
Bavaria	Nürnberger Land		86	Nürnberg-Mögeldorf	A 3 / E45	
Bavaria	Nürnberger Land			Schwaig-Behringersdorf		
Bavaria	Nürnberger Land			Lauf		
Bavaria	Nürnberger Land			Lauf city center local diversion		
Bavaria	Nürnberger Land		BR	Pegnitz		
Bavaria	Nürnberger Land		50	Lauf	A 9 / E51	
Bavaria	Nürnberger Land			replaced by A 9 / E51		
Bavaria	Nürnberger Land		49	Lauf-Hersbruck	A 9 / E51	
Bavaria	Nürnberger Land			Reichenschwand		
Bavaria	Nürnberger Land		BR	Pegnitz		
Bavaria	Nürnberger Land			Hersbruck-Weiher local diversion		
Bavaria	Nürnberger Land			Hersbruck		
Bavaria	Nürnberger Land			Naturpark Fränkische Schweiz		
Bavaria	Nürnberger Land			Happurg		
Bavaria	Nürnberger Land			Pommelsbrunn-Hohenstadt		
Bavaria	Nürnberger Land			Pommelsbrunn		
Bavaria	Amberg-Sulzbach			Sulzbach-Rosenberg	B 85	
Bavaria	Amberg-Sulzbach			Hahnbach		
Bavaria	Amberg-Sulzbach			Vils		
Bavaria	Amberg-Sulzbach			Gebenbach	B 299	
Bavaria	Amberg-Sulzbach			Hirschau		
Bavaria	Amberg-Sulzbach			Naturpark Nördlicher Oberpfälzer Wald		
Bavaria	Amberg-Sulzbach			Schnaittenbach		
Bavaria	Schwandorf		27	Wernberg-Köblitz	A 93	
Bavaria	Schwandorf			Wernberg-Köblitz		
Bavaria	Schwandorf		BR	Naab		
Bavaria	Neustadt an der Waldnaab			Wieselrieth local diversion	B 22	
Bavaria	Neustadt an der Waldnaab		72	Leuchtenberg	A 6 / E50 / B 22	
Bavaria	Neustadt an der Waldnaab			replaced by A 6 / E50		
Bavaria	Neustadt an der Waldnaab		75	Pleystein	A 6 / E50	
Bavaria	Neustadt an der Waldnaab			Pleystein-Lohma		
Bavaria	Neustadt an der Waldnaab			Waidhaus		
Bavaria	Neustadt an der Waldnaab			Waidhaus/Rozvadov border crossing		
Czech Republic–Germany border Continues as Route 605 to Rozvadov and Přimda

== See also ==
- List of federal highways in Germany
