= Eslarn =

- Municipality
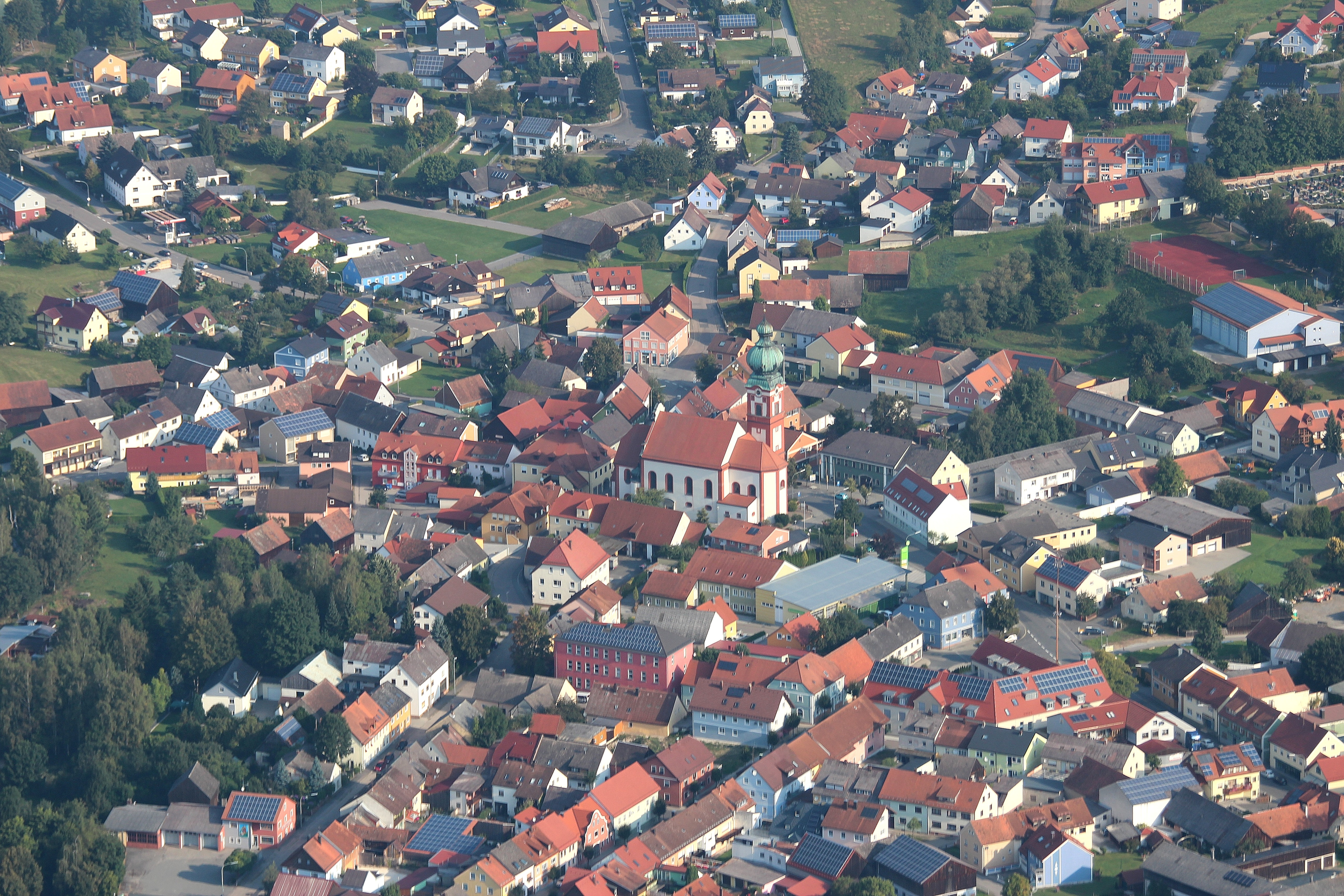
- Aerial view

- Coat of arms

- Location of Eslarn within Neustadt a.d.Waldnaab district
- Interactive map of Eslarn
- Location within Germany Location within Bavaria
- Coordinates: 49°34′57″N 12°31′16″E
- Country: Germany
- State: Bavaria
- Admin. region: Oberpfalz
- District: Neustadt a.d.Waldnaab

Government
  - Mayor (2020–26): Reiner Gäbl (SPD)

Area
  - Total: 55.22 km^{2} (21.32 sq mi)
- Elevation: 516 m (1,693 ft)

Population (2025-12-31)
  - Total: 2,640
  - Density: 47.8/km^{2} (124/sq mi)
- Time zone: UTC+01:00 (CET)
  - Summer (DST): UTC+02:00 (CEST)
- Postal codes: 92693
- Dialling codes: 09653
- Vehicle registration: NEW
- Website: eslarn.de

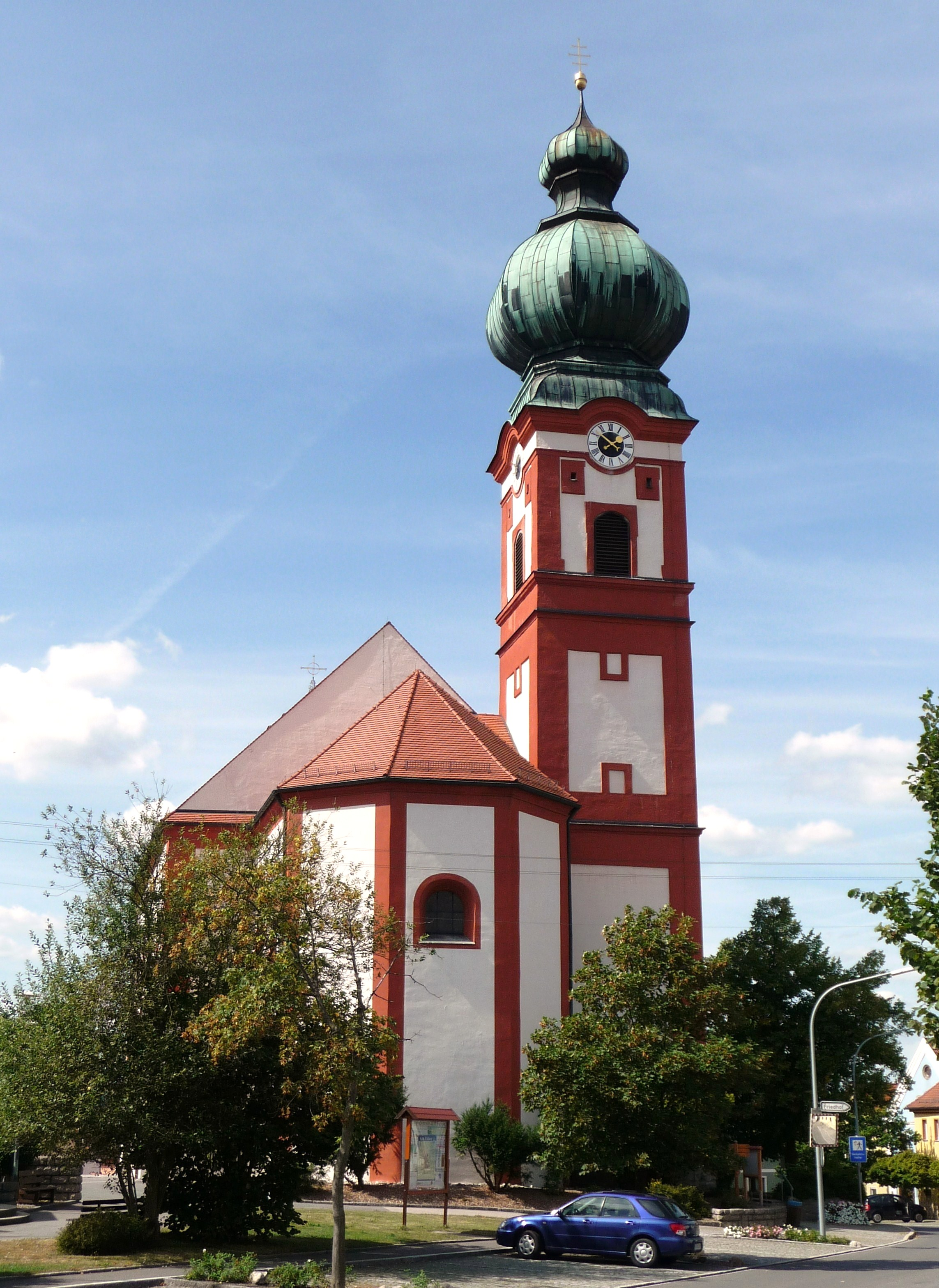
Church of the Assumption

Eslarn (German pronunciation: [ˈeːslaʁn]; Northern Bavarian: Isling) is a market town and municipality in the district of Neustadt an der Waldnaab in Bavaria, Germany.

== Neighbouring communities ==
Eslarn neighbours the following communities, clockwise: Waidhaus, Rozvadov, Třemešné (Czechia), Bělá nad Radbuzou (Czechia), Schönsee, Oberviechtach, Moosbach (Oberpfalz), and Pleystein.
