= Hněvnice =

- Municipality
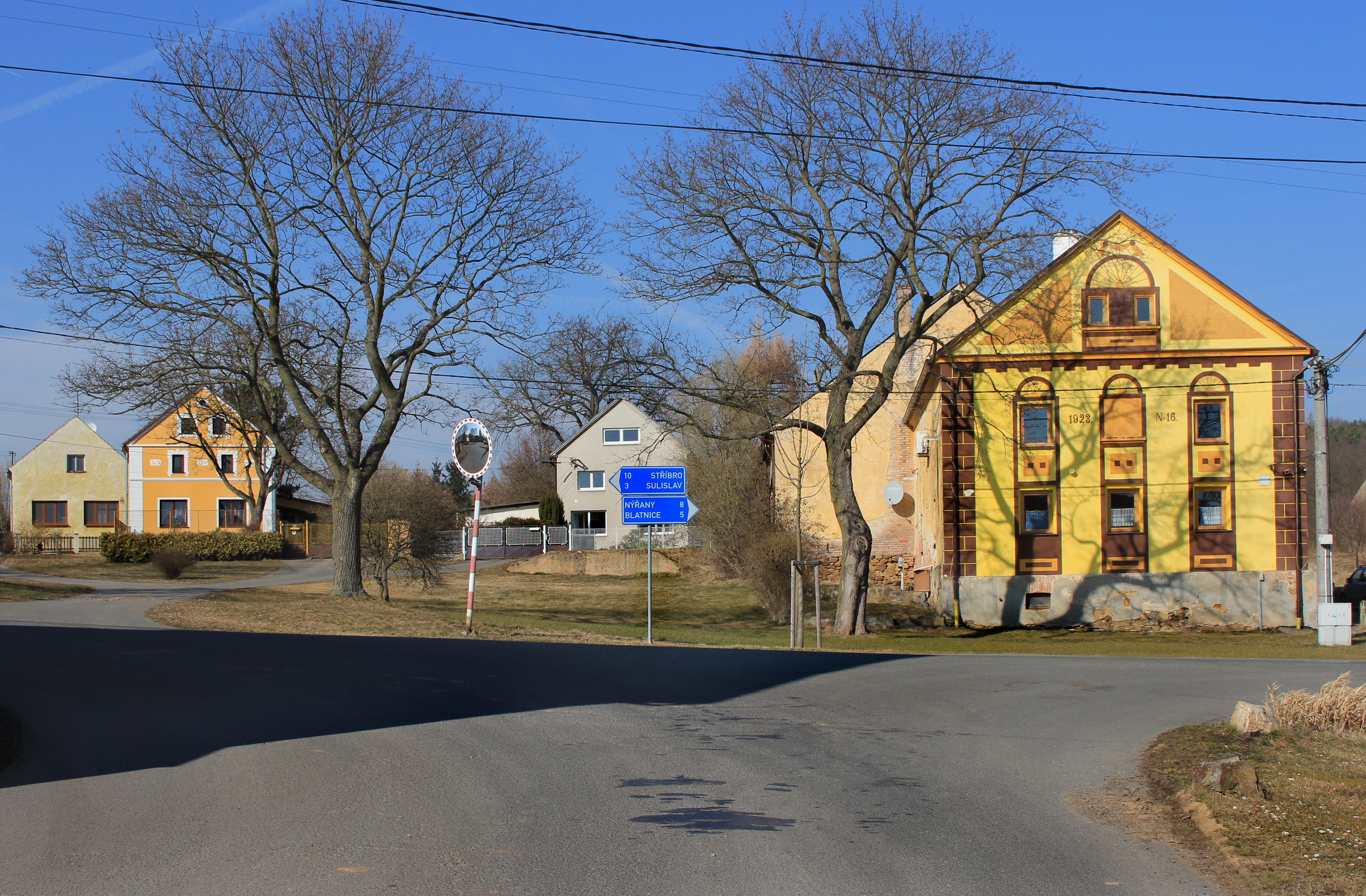
- Centre of Hněvnice

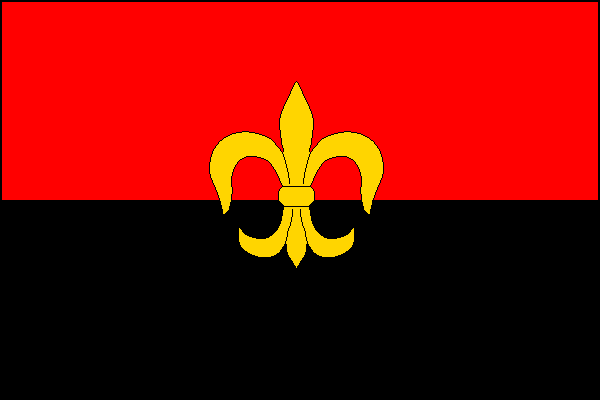
- Flag Coat of arms

- Location in the Czech Republic
- Coordinates: 49°43′43″N 13°6′11″E
- Country: Czech Republic
- Region: Plzeň
- District: Plzeň-North
- First mentioned: 1115

Area
  - Total: 7.11 km^{2} (2.75 sq mi)
- Elevation: 422 m (1,385 ft)

Population (2026-01-01)
  - Total: 127
  - Density: 17.9/km^{2} (46.3/sq mi)
- Time zone: UTC+1 (CET)
  - Summer (DST): UTC+2 (CEST)
- Postal code: 330 23
- Website: www.hnevnice.cz

Hněvnice is a municipality and village in Plzeň-North District in the Plzeň Region of the Czech Republic. It has about 100 inhabitants.

== Geography ==
Hněvnice is located about 19 kilometres (12 mi) west of Plzeň. It lies in the Plasy Uplands. The highest point is the flat hill Dobrák at 507 m (1,663 ft) above sea level.

== Demographics ==
Historical population
Year	Pop.	±%
1869	356	—
1880	359	+0.8%
1890	362	+0.8%
1900	354	−2.2%
1910	332	−6.2%
1921	292	−12.0%
1930	312	+6.8%
1950	164	−47.4%
1961	178	+8.5%
1970	164	−7.9%
1980	112	−31.7%
1991	87	−22.3%
2001	94	+8.0%
2011	104	+10.6%
2021	106	+1.9%
Source: Censuses

== Transport ==
The D5 motorway from Plzeň to the Czech–German border in Rozvadov runs through the southern part of the municipal territory.
