= Bundesautobahn 81 =

Federal motorway in Germany

A 81
- Bundesautobahn 81

Route information
- Length: 283 km (176 mi)

Major junctions
- North end: A 3 in Würzburg
- South end: B 34 in Gottmadingen

Location
- Country: Germany
- States: Bavaria, Baden-Württemberg

Highway system
- Roads in Germany; Autobahns; List; Federal; List; State; E-roads
← A 73	→ A 82

Bundesautobahn 81 (translates from German as Federal Motorway 81, short form Autobahn 81, abbreviated as BAB 81 or A 81) is a motorway in Germany. It branches off the A 3 at the Würzburg-West triangle and ends near the border with Switzerland.

The oldest part of the A 81 between the Weinsberg intersection (A 6) near Heilbronn and Dreieck Leonberg (A 8) near Stuttgart was finished in the years 1938 to 1940. This section included the first tunnel built for an autobahn, the 300-metre-long (980 ft) first Engelberg tunnel near Leonberg. When Weinsberg-Leonberg was upgraded to 3+3 lanes in the 1970s, the tunnel with its two lanes each and steep grades (up to 6%) became something of a bottleneck. In 1999 a new 2,530-metre-long (8,300 ft) Engelberg tunnel was opened.

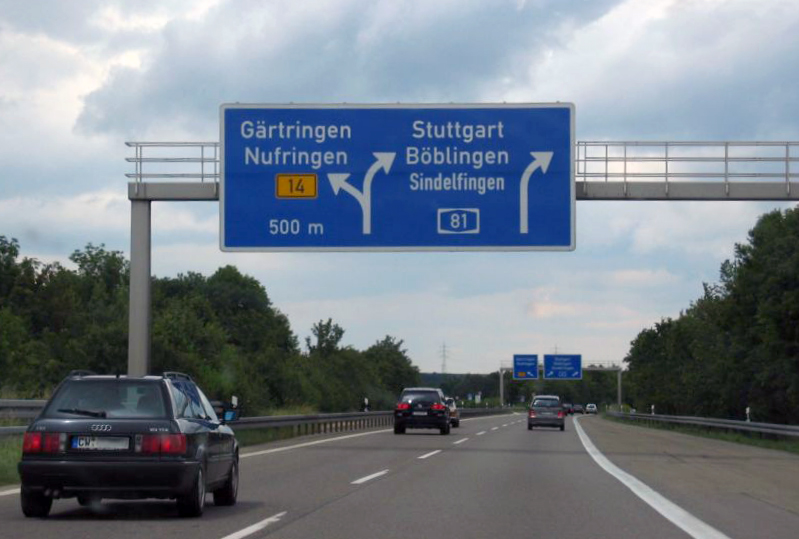
Gärtringen: One of the few German autobahn exits to the left

Original plans called for the A 81 to be continued northwards skirting the north-west of Würzburg to join up with the A 7, but these plans were later abandoned. Instead, the A 81 shares a part of the A 8 to the Stuttgart intersection and then continues south on a motorway that was built as A 831 to Gärtringen, where it meets the original line again at a partly finished intersection. As a result of this change of plans, Gärtringen became one of the few exits in the German autobahn network that leave to the left.

Further south, the terrain required some spectacular engineering, including a 900-metre-long (3,000 ft) bridge near Horb that spans 125 m above the Neckar river. Currently, the A 81 ends near Singen.

== Exit list ==
	(1)	Würzburg-West 3-way interchange A 3 E41 E43
	(2)	Gerchsheim
		Spitalwald parking area
		Gerchsheimer Grund parking area
		Services Kleinraststätte ob der Tauber
		Rötensteinbrücke 387 m
		parking area
	(3)	Tauberbischofsheim B 27 B 290
		Taubertalbrücke 661 m
		Steinbacher Höhe parking area
		Muckbachtalbrücke 330 m
		Löchle parking area
		Schüpfbachtalbrücke 280 m
	(4)	Ahorn
		Brombach parking area
		Brücke über die Frankenbahn 50 m
		parking area
		Lindich parking area
	(5)	Boxberg B 292
		Rest area Holzspitze
		Seegrund parking area
	(6)	Osterburken B 292 B 293
		Denzer parking area
		Großer Wald parking area
		Services Kleinrastätte Jagsttal
		Jagsttalbrücke 889 m
	(7)	Möckmühl
		Egerten parking area
		Kochertalbrücke 478 m
		Straßebrücke 50 m
	(8)	Neuenstadt
		Brettachtalbrücke 386 m
		Sulzrain parking area
		Tunnel Hölzerntunnel 470 m
		Eberbachtalbrücke 310 m
		Eberbachtal parking area
	(9)	Weinsberg 4-way interchange A 6 E50
		Bahnstrecke Crailsheim-Heilbronn 60 m
	(10)	Weinsberg / Ellhofen B 39a
		Reisberg parking area
		Grafenwald parking area
	(11)	Heibronn / Untergruppenbach
	(12)	Ilsfeld
		Services Wunnenstein
	(13)	Mundelsheim
		Rest area Kälbling
	(14)	Pleidelsheim
		Neckartalbrücke 410 m
	(15)	Ludwigsburg-Nord B 27
		Brücke über Frankenbahn 60 m
	(16)	Ludwigsburg-Süd
Kreuz	(17)	Stuttgart-Zuffenhausen interchange B 10
		Brücke über Schwarzaldbahn 70 m
	(18)	Stuttgart-Feuerbach B 295
		Beutenbachtalbrücke 150 m
		Rest area Engelberg/Gerlinger Höhe
		Tunnel Engelbergtunnel 2530 m
	(19)	Dreieck Leonberg 3-way interchange A 8 E52
A 8 A 81
	( )	Leonberg-Ost
		Friedensbrücke 320 m
		Services Sindelfinger Wald
		Rest area Sommerhofen
A 8 A 81
	(20)	Stuttgart 4-way interchange A 8 E52 A 831
	(21)	Sindelfingen-Ost
		Straßenbrücke 60 m
	(22)	Böblingen-Ost
		Straßenbrücke 50 m
		Tunnel Lärmschutzdeckel 850 m (under construction until 2026 at least)
	(23)	Böblingen/Sindelfingen
Kreuz	(24)	Böblingen-Hulb interchange B 464
	(25)	Ehningen B 14
		Würmtalbrücke 242 m
	(26)	Hildrizhausen
	(27)	Gärtringen B 14
		Services Schönbuch
		Tunnel Schönbuchtunnel 606 m
	(28)	Herrenberg B 28
		Ammertalbahn 50 m
		Kochhartgrabenbrücke 252 m
		Rest area Ziegler/Geyern
	(29)	Rottenburg B 28a
		Rest area Neckarblick/Hirtenhaus
		Neckartalbrücke (Weitingen) 918 m
	(30)	Horb am Neckar B 32
		Talbrücke 90 m
		parking area
	(31)	Empfingen B 463
		Mühlbachtalviadukt 582 m
		parking area
	(32)	Sulz am Neckar
		Rest area Hasenrain
	(33)	Oberndorf am Neckar
		Trichtenbachtalbrücke 140 m
		Talbrücke 130 m
		parking area
		parking area
		Schlichemtalbrücke 240 m
		Services Neckarburg
		Neckarburgbrücke 365 m
	(34)	Rottweil B 462
		Rest area Eschachtal
		Eschachtalbrücke 443 m
		Neckartalbrücke 206 m
		Bahnstrecke Rottweil-Villingen 50 m
Kreuz	(35)	Villingen-Schwenningen interchange B 27
		parking area
	(36)	Tuningen B 523
		parking area
	(37)	Bad Dürrheim 3-way interchange A 864 E531
		Rest area Räthisgraben
		Rest area Unterhölzer Wald
		Donautalbrücke 318 m
	(38)	Geisingen B 31 B 33 B 311
		Ziegelbuckbrücke 196 m
		parking area
		Immensitzbrücke 227 m
		parking area
		Talbachbrücke 484 m
		Services / Motel Im Hegau
		Brudertalbrücke 337 m
	(39)	Engen B 31 B 491
		Bruckried/Klauseneck parking area
	(40)	Hegau 4-way interchange A 98 E54 B 33
	(41)	Singen (Hohentwiel) B 33
		Saubachbrücke 391 m
		Talbrücke 70 m
		Tunnel Hohentwieltunnel 833 m
	(42)	Hilzingen B 314
		Riederbachtalbrücke 216 m
		Tunnel Heilsbergtunnel 483 m
		Brücke über Hochrheinbahn 70 m
	(43)	Gottmadingen B 34 E41 E54
