= E51 =

E51 may refer to:

- Nokia E51, a Symbian OS smartphone
- HMS E51, a British E class submarine
- European route E51, a road connecting Berlin and Nuremberg in Germany
- Nimzo-Indian Defence, Encyclopaedia of Chess Openings code
- Higashi-Kantō Expressway, route E51 in Japan
- Praga E-51, a Czechoslovak monoplane bomber prototype
