= Waidhaus =

- Municipality
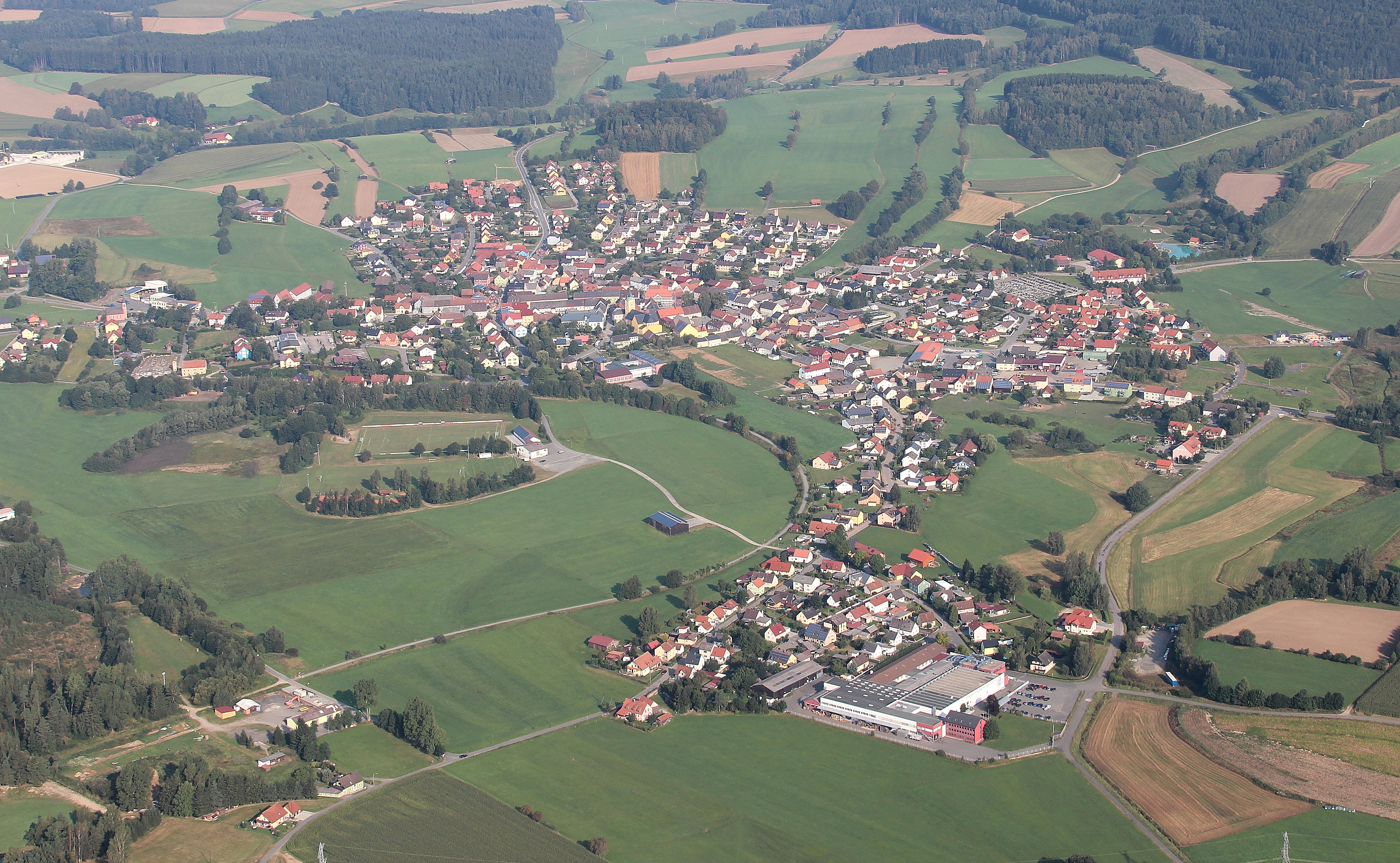
- Aerial view

- Coat of arms

- Location of Waidhaus within Neustadt a.d.Waldnaab district
- Interactive map of Waidhaus
- Location within Germany Location within Bavaria
- Coordinates: 49°38′30″N 12°29′40″E
- Country: Germany
- State: Bavaria
- Admin. region: Oberpfalz
- District: Neustadt a.d.Waldnaab

Government
  - Mayor (2020–26): Markus Bauriedl

Area
  - Total: 37.32 km^{2} (14.41 sq mi)
- Elevation: 524 m (1,719 ft)

Population (2025-12-31)
  - Total: 2,093
  - Density: 56.08/km^{2} (145.3/sq mi)
- Time zone: UTC+01:00 (CET)
  - Summer (DST): UTC+02:00 (CEST)
- Postal codes: 92726
- Dialling codes: 09652
- Vehicle registration: NEW
- Website: www.waidhaus.de

Waidhaus (German pronunciation: [ˈvaɪthaʊs]) is a municipality in the district of Neustadt an der Waldnaab in Bavaria, Germany. It lies near the border with the Czech Republic, and near the major border crossing between Bavaria and the Czech Republic, where the Bavarian A6 meets the Czech D5 motorway. The closest towns are on the German side Pleystein and on the Czech side Rozvadov. A gas pipeline and a powerline also cross the border between Bavaria and the Czech Republic there.

== Neighbouring communities ==
The neighbouring communities clockwise: Rozvadov, Eslarn, Pleystein, Georgenberg.

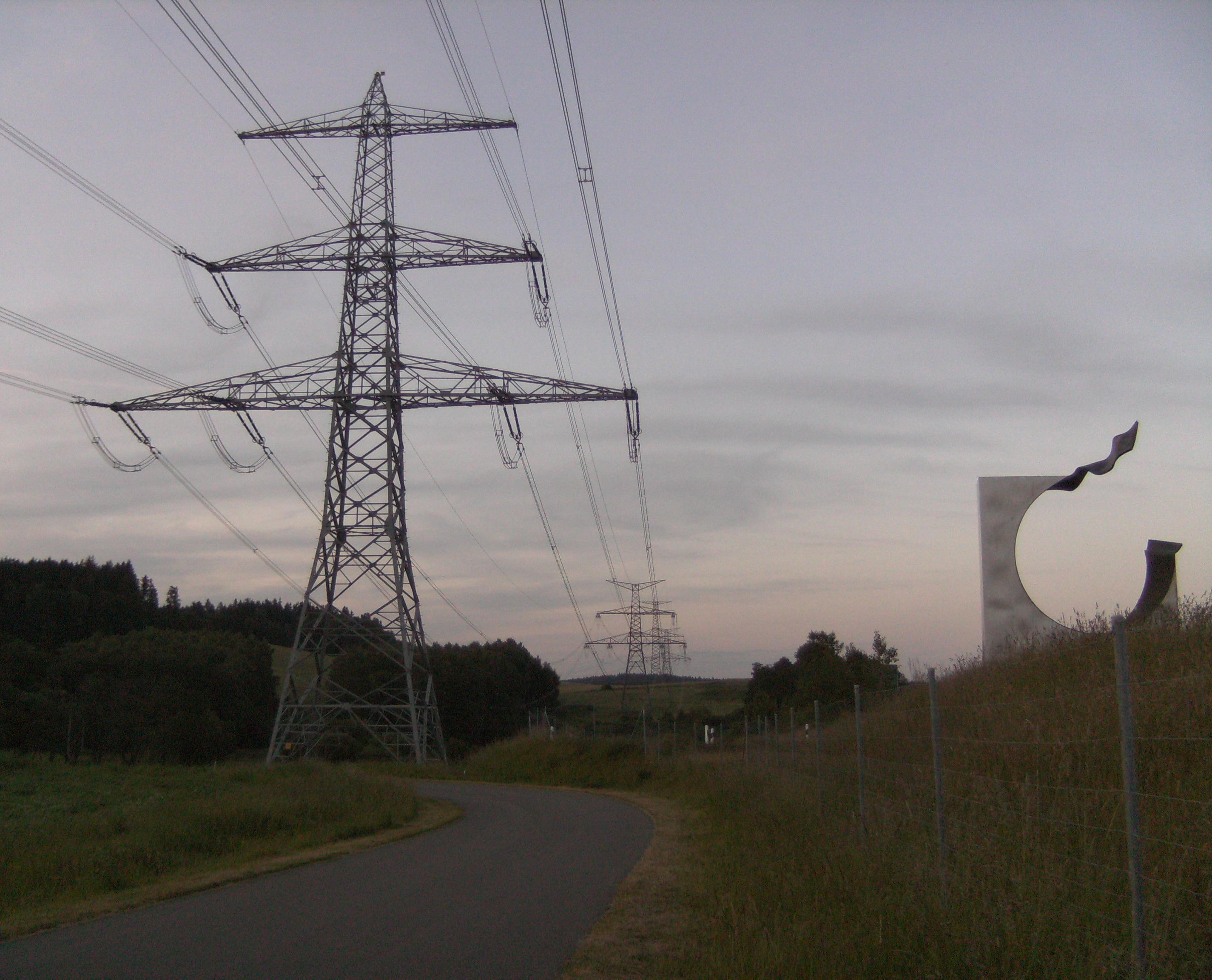
380 kV-powerline crossing the national border between Bavaria and Czech near Waidhaus. The pylon in the foreground stands in Bavaria the others are in the Czech Republic
