= Theodor Heuss Bridge =

Theodor Heuss Bridge may refer to the following:

- Theodor Heuss Bridge (Mainz-Wiesbaden), an arch bridge over the Rhine River
- Theodor Heuss Bridge (Düsseldorf), a cable-stayed bridge over the Rhine River in Düsseldorf
- Theodor Heuss Bridge (Frankenthal), a bridge that spans the Rhine River along Autobahn 6
