= FC Epfendorf 1929 =

German sports club

- Full name: Fußballclub Epfendorf 1929 e.V.
- Founded: 2 May 1929; 95 years ago
- Ground: Schlichem Stadion
- Chairman: Thorsten Sackmann
- League: Kreisliga A (IX)
- 2019/20: 14th
- Website: http://www.fc-epfendorf.de/

FC Epfendorf 1929 e.V. is a German sports club based in Epfendorf, Baden-Württemberg. The team currently plays in the Kreisliga A, the ninth tier of the German football league system.

== History ==
FC Epfendorf 1929 was officially founded on 2 May 1929 at the Gasthaus Engel in Epfendorf. The club played its first match on 22 September of that year, a 6–2 victory over SV Durchhausen.

== Recent seasons ==
Year	Division	League	Record (W–D–L)	Points	Regular Season
2010/11	VIII	Bezirksliga	12–8–8	44	7th
2011/12	VIII	Bezirksliga	10–8–12	38	9th
2012/13	VIII	Bezirksliga	6–9–12	27	13th
2013/14	VIII	Bezirksliga	9–4–15	31	11th
2014/15	VIII	Bezirksliga	5–6–19	21	15th ↓
2015/16	IX	Kreisliga A	13–9–10	48	8th
2016/17	IX	Kreisliga A	11–4–13	37	9th
2017/18	IX	Kreisliga A	5–8–15	23	14th ↓
2018/19	X	Kreisliga B	16–6–4	54	3rd ↑
2019/20	IX	Kreisliga A	4–3–10	15	14th
2020/21	IX	Kreisliga A	1–0–8	3	

Key

↑ Promoted	↓ Relegated
