= Diana (Rozvadov) =

- Village
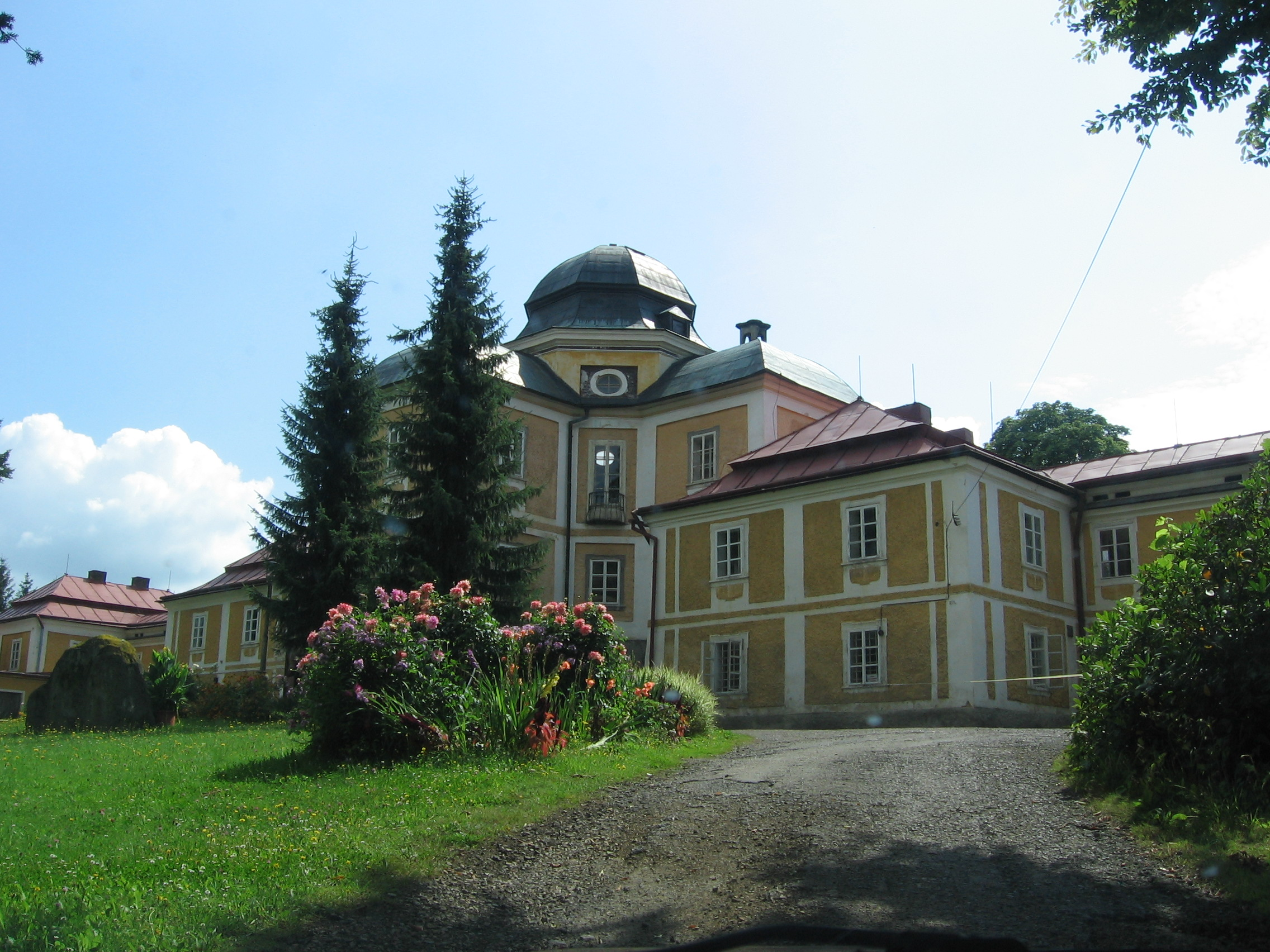
- Diana hunting mansion

- Location in the Czech Republic
- Coordinates: 49°37′53″N 12°35′37″E
- Country: Czech Republic
- Region: Plzeň
- District: Tachov
- Municipality: Rozvadov
- First mentioned: 1742
- Elevation: 528 m (1,732 ft)

Population (2021)
  - Total: 13
- Time zone: UTC+1 (CET)
  - Summer (DST): UTC+2 (CEST)
- Postal code: 348 07

Diana (German: Dianaberg) is a village and administrative part of Rozvadov in the Plzeň Region of the Czech Republic. As of 2011, the population was 27 people. The area of Diana consists also of a former glasshouse and a large defunct woodworking factory.

== Geography ==
Diana is located in the forests in the southern part of the municipality. The adjacent Diana Nature Reserve (since 1933) consists of one of the oldest and most valuable beech tree forests in the Upper Palatine Forest.

== History ==
A hunting mansion Diana (first mentioned in 1742) is situated in the settlement. The mansion, which is owned by the noble Kolowrat family, was named after the goddess of hunting. Its project is sometimes attributed to the architect Jan Santini Aichel.
