= Bundesautobahn 831 =

Federal motorway in Germany

A 831
- Bundesautobahn 831
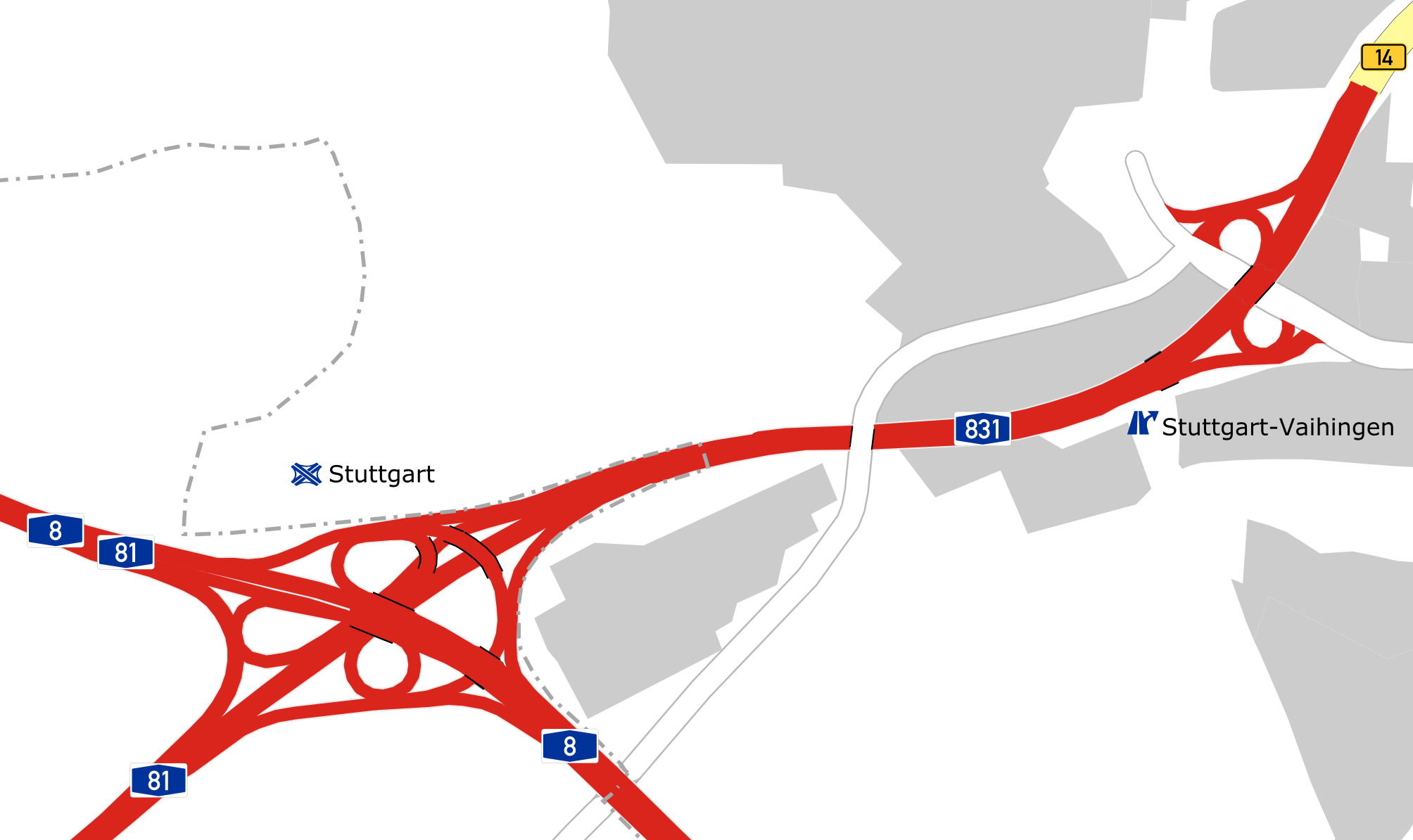

Route information
- Length: 2.3 km (1.4 mi)

Major junctions
- North end: Vaihingen auf den Fildern
- South end: northeast of Sindelfingen

Location
- Country: Germany
- States: Baden-Württemberg

Highway system
- Roads in Germany; Autobahns; List; Federal; List; State; E-roads

Bundesautobahn 831 (translates from German as Federal Motorway 831, short form Autobahn 831, abbreviated as BAB 831 or A 831) is an autobahn in Germany.

The A 831 is one of the shortest autobahns in Germany, measuring 2.3 km and containing two junctions. Originally, the A 831 continued another 15 km to Gärtringen, where an intersection with a planned section of the A 81 would have been located. The A 81 north of Gärtringen was eventually cancelled, leaving a half-finished interchange that is one of the few in Germany that requires traffic to leave from the passing lane. As a result, for consistency, the A 81 took over the A 831's routing up to the Kreuz Stuttgart interchange with the A 8, where it heads west (concurrent with the A 8) to rejoin the original route.

The 2.3 km of autobahn that remained was initially not signed as the A 831. Heading northbound, travelers were told they were on the B 14; those coming from Stuttgart only saw signs for the A 8/A 81 once they passed Stuttgart-Vaihingen. The A 831 was again fully signed in mid-2009.

== Exit list ==
State	District	Location	km	mi	Exit	Name	Destinations	Notes
Baden-Württemberg	Stuttgart	Stuttgart					B 14 – Stuttgart-Centre	northern endpoint of motorway
Baden-Württemberg	Stuttgart	Stuttgart			1	Stuttgart-Vaihingen	Hauptstr. Vaihingen	
Baden-Württemberg	Stuttgart	Stuttgart			2	Kreuz Stuttgart	A 8 / A 81 – München, Karlsruhe, Heilbronn	-
Baden-Württemberg	Stuttgart	Stuttgart					A 81 – Singen, Böblingen, Sindelfingen	southern endpoint of motorway
1.000 mi = 1.609 km; 1.000 km = 0.621 mi
