= Epfendorf =

- Municipality
- Coat of arms

- Location of Epfendorf within Rottweil district
- Interactive map of Epfendorf
- Location within Germany Location within Baden-Württemberg
- Coordinates: 48°14′58″N 08°35′54″E
- Country: Germany
- State: Baden-Württemberg
- Admin. region: Freiburg
- District: Rottweil

Government
  - Mayor: Mark Prielipp

Area
  - Total: 29.68 km^{2} (11.46 sq mi)
- Elevation: 572 m (1,877 ft)

Population (2025-12-31)
  - Total: 3,095
  - Density: 104.3/km^{2} (270.1/sq mi)
- Time zone: UTC+01:00 (CET)
  - Summer (DST): UTC+02:00 (CEST)
- Postal codes: 78736
- Dialling codes: 07404
- Vehicle registration: RW
- Website: www.epfendorf.de

Epfendorf (German pronunciation: [ˈɛpfn̩dɔʁf]; Swabian: Äpfedorf) is a municipality in the district of Rottweil, in Baden-Württemberg, Germany. Epfendorf is located in the Upper Neckar valley between Oberndorf am Neckar and Rottweil.

== Neighboring communities ==
The municipality borders to the north to the town of Oberndorf, to the east to the city of Rosenfeld in Zollernalbkreis, on the south to Dietingen and Villingendorf and on the west to Bösingen.

== Outline ==
The community consists of the main town Epfendorf and the three districts Harthausen, Talhausen and Trichtingen.

== History ==
The exact age of Epfendorf is not known, but the place was first documented in 994. Findings indicate a Roman settlement, a Roman road led to the Roman settlement in Waldmössingen. On January 1, 1974, the municipality Harthausen was incorporated to Epfendorf. The incorporation of Trichtingen was on January 1, 1975.

== Religions ==
Mariä Heimsuchung (Visitation of Mary) is a Roman Catholic parish of the Roman Catholic Diocese of Rottenburg-Stuttgart in Talhausen.

The evangelical church Trichtingen (which also includes the main town Epfendorf ) belongs to the church district Sulz am Neckar and this belongs to the Evangelical-Lutheran Church in Württemberg.

== Politics ==
The community belongs to the agreed management community with the city Oberndorf am Neckar.

== Council ==
The local elections on 25 May 2014 led to the following conclusions:

- CDU / FW 47.2% (-4.7) 9 seats (-1)
- Free citizens 52.8% (+4.7) 10 seats (+/- 0)

== Crest ==
Blazon : In red, a blue-lined golden ducal crown with Hermelinstulp.

== Things ==
Epfendorf is located on the Neckar cycle path, which passes many sights.

== Hiking and biking trails ==
Epfendorf has an extensive network of hiking trails. The Schlichem hiking trail ends in Epfendorf. Less experienced hikers can walk in summer with the Cyclo-shuttle from starting-point Tieringen in stages.

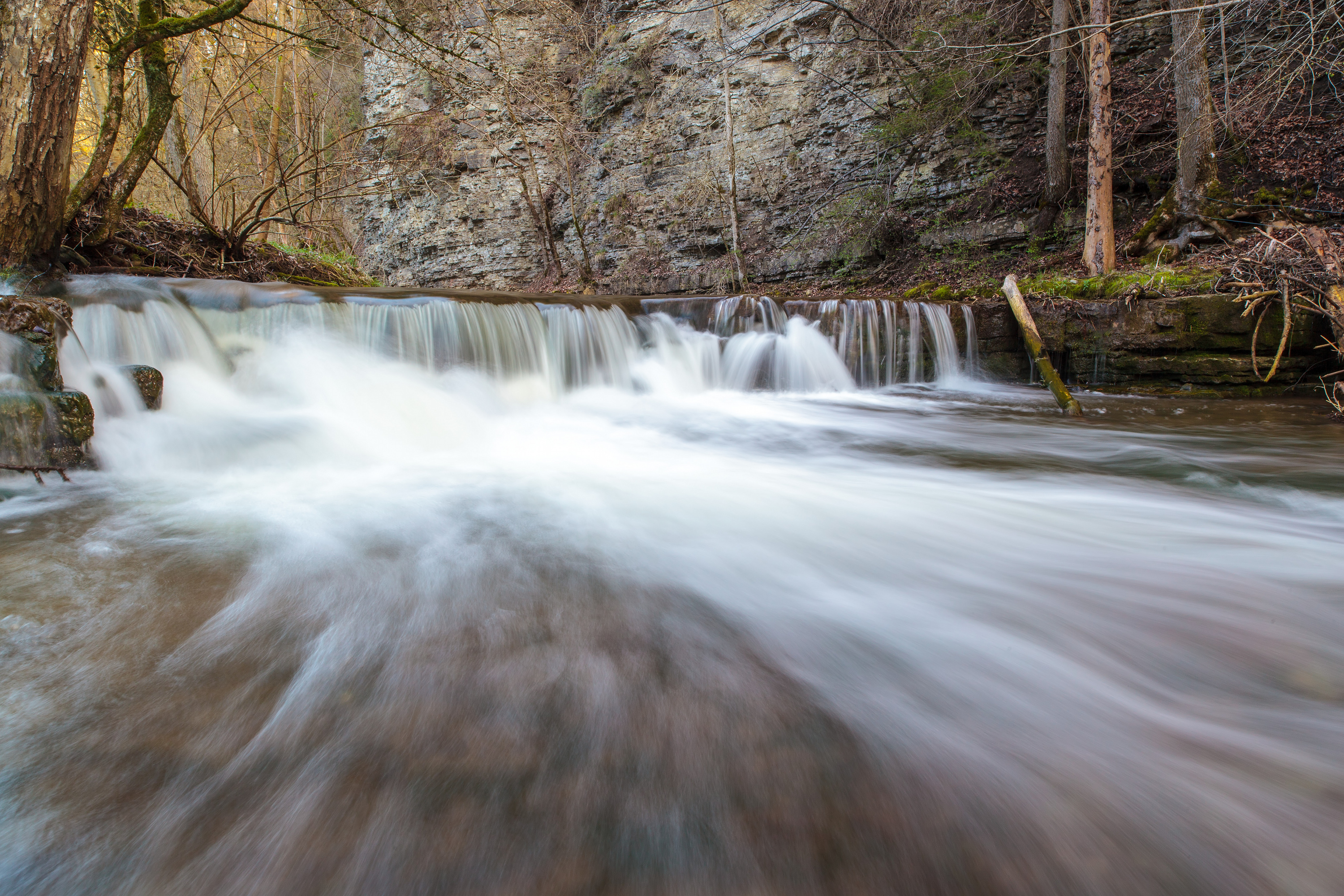
Schlichem river

== Buildings ==
Not far from Harthausen is located in the woods the Lichtenegg Castle. It can not be visited because it is privately owned.

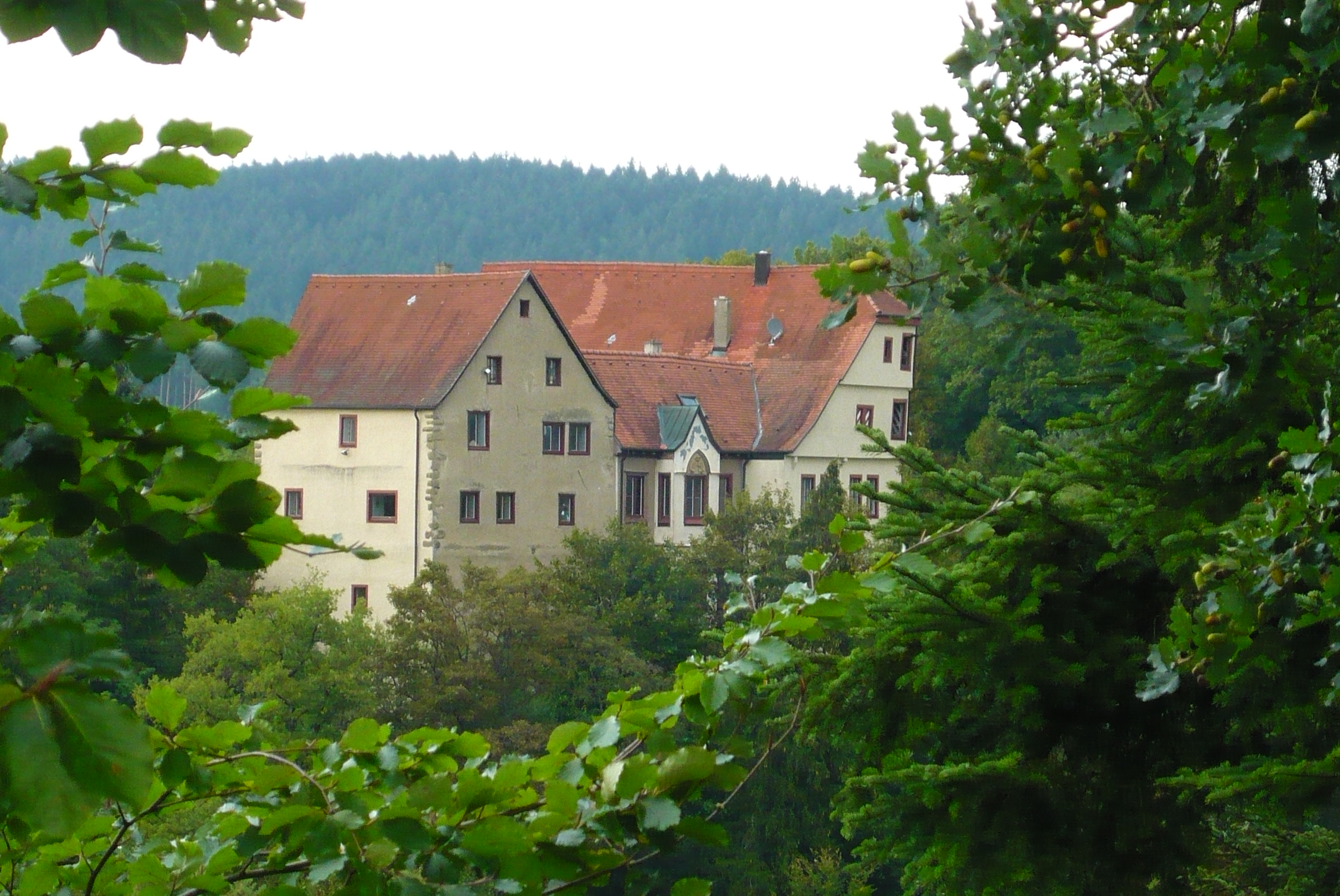
Schloss Lichtenegg

== Transportation ==
Epfendorf is located on the Bundesstraße 14 and on the Plochingen–Immendingen railway, but it is currently not served by passenger trains.

== Education ==
The municipality has two primary schools and a secondary school with Werkrealschule. All secondary schools are available in the nearby towns of Oberndorf and Rottweil.

== Sport ==
The town's football club is FC Epfendorf 1929.
