= Pleystein (Verwaltungsgemeinschaft) =

- Verwaltungsgemeinschaft
- Location of Pleystein within Neustadt an der Waldnaab district
- Interactive map of Pleystein
- Location within Germany Location within Bavaria
- Coordinates: 49°39′N 12°25′E
- Country: Germany
- State: Bavaria
- Admin. region: Upper Palatinate
- District: Neustadt an der Waldnaab
- Seat: Pleystein
- Subdivisions: 2 municipalities

Area
  - Total: 79.21 km^{2} (30.58 sq mi)

Population (2025-12-31)
  - Total: 3,587
  - Density: 45.28/km^{2} (117.3/sq mi)
- Time zone: UTC+01:00 (CET)
  - Summer (DST): UTC+02:00 (CEST)
- Website: www.pleystein.de

Pleystein is a Verwaltungsgemeinschaft (municipal association) in the district of Neustadt an der Waldnaab in Bavaria, Germany. Its seat is in Pleystein.

It consists of the following municipalities:

1. Georgenberg
2. Pleystein
