= Kocher Viaduct =

Bridge between Heilbronn and Nuremberg in Germany

Kocher Viaduct Kochertalbrücke
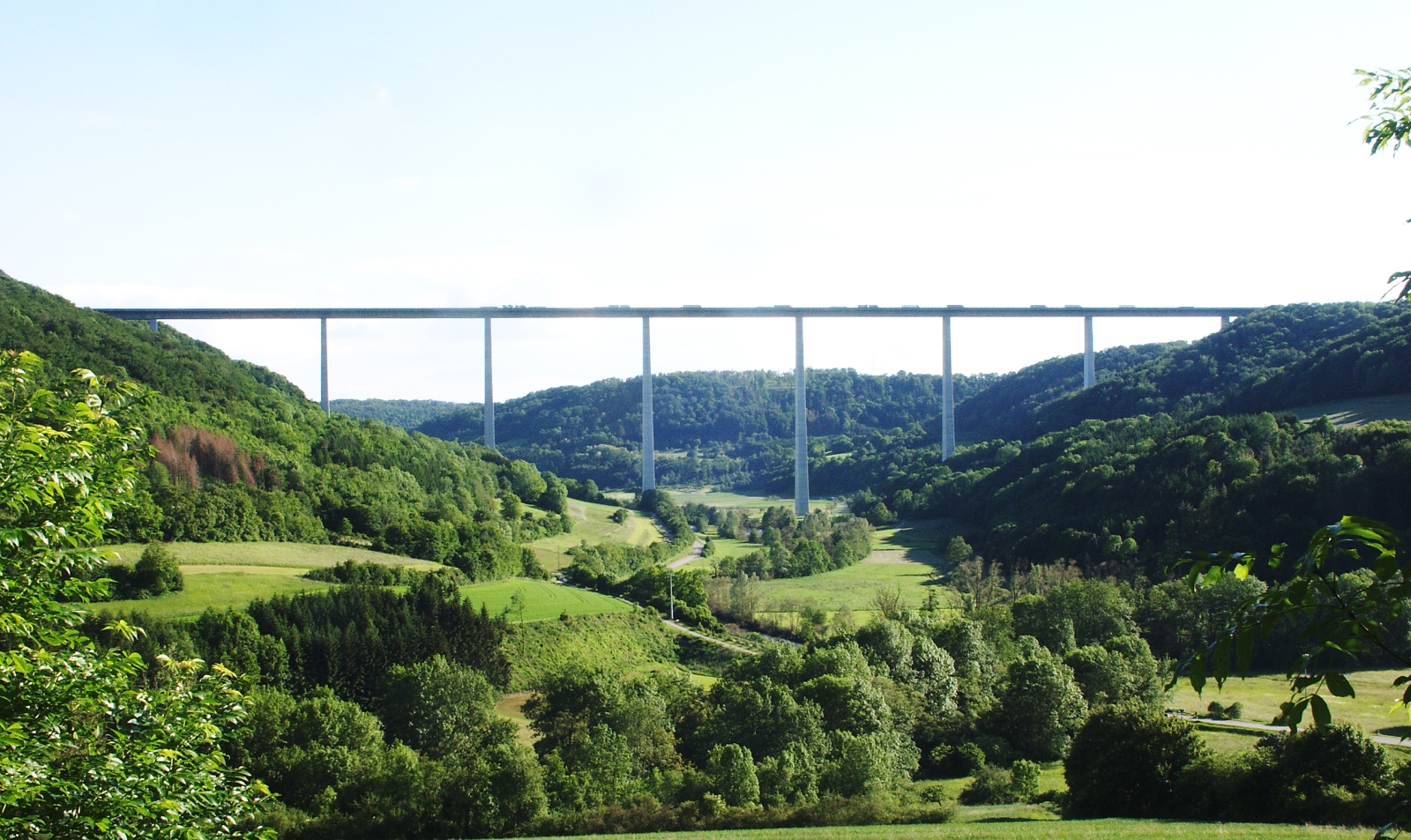
- Coordinates: 49.177543°N 9.785833°E
- Carries: Autobahn 6
- Crosses: Kocher valley

Characteristics
- Total length: 1,128 metres (3,701 ft)
- Width: 31 metres (102 ft)
- Height: 178 metres (584 ft)
- Clearance below: 185 metres (607 ft)

History
- Construction start: 1976
- Construction end: 1979

The Kocher Viaduct (German: Kochertalbrücke) near Schwäbisch Hall in Germany is a bridge that conducts the Autobahn 6 across the Kocher valley between Heilbronn and Nuremberg. With a maximum height of 185m above the valley bottom, it is the highest viaduct in Germany and was also the bridge with the tallest pillars in the world before the Millau Viaduct was completed in 2004, in France.

The nine spans of the viaduct's prestressed-concrete girder bridge cover a length of 1128m, with individual span lengths being 81m for the outer two and 138m for the remaining seven. Pillar height varies from 40m to 178m. The bridge table is 31m wide. Construction took place from 1976 to 1979.

A museum in the village of Geislingen am Kocher below the bridge not only tells the viaduct's story but also displays dinosaur fossils found during the construction of the motorway.

== See also ==
- List of bridges in Germany
- List of highest bridges
- List of tallest bridges
