= Dietingen =

- Municipality
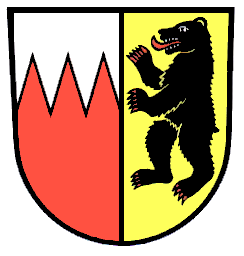
- Coat of arms

- Location of Dietingen within Rottweil district
- Interactive map of Dietingen
- Location within Germany Location within Baden-Württemberg
- Coordinates: 48°12′20″N 08°38′46″E
- Country: Germany
- State: Baden-Württemberg
- Admin. region: Freiburg
- District: Rottweil

Government
  - Mayor (2016–24): Frank Scholz

Area
  - Total: 42.26 km^{2} (16.32 sq mi)
- Elevation: 575 m (1,886 ft)

Population (2025-12-31)
  - Total: 4,166
  - Density: 98.58/km^{2} (255.3/sq mi)
- Time zone: UTC+01:00 (CET)
  - Summer (DST): UTC+02:00 (CEST)
- Postal codes: 78661
- Dialling codes: 0741 bzw. 07404
- Vehicle registration: RW
- Website: www.dietingen.de

Dietingen (German pronunciation: [ˈdiːtɪŋən]) is a municipality in the district of Rottweil, in Baden-Württemberg, Germany.

== Geography ==
Dietingen is located in the Upper Neckar valley between the Black Forest and the Swabian Jura in 544–623 meters altitude, about five kilometers away from the town of Rottweil.

== Neighboring communities ==
The municipality borders to Epfendorf, on the east to Rosenfeld and Zimmern unter der Burg in the Zollernalbkreis, in the south to the county town Rottweil and in the west to Villingendorf.

== Municipality arrangement ==
The municipality Dietingen includes the formerly independent municipalities Böhringen, Gößlingen, Irslingen and Rotenzimmern.

- To Böhringen belonged the village Böhringen and residential spaces Böhringer mill and chapel courtyard.
- To Dietingen belonged before the local government reform in the 1970s the village Dietingen, the castle and farmstead Hohenstein, the farm Tierstein and the living space Hasler-Wasen.
- To Gößlingen belonged the village Gößlingen.
- To Irslingen belonged the village Irslingen, Häuser, chapel Maria Hochheim.

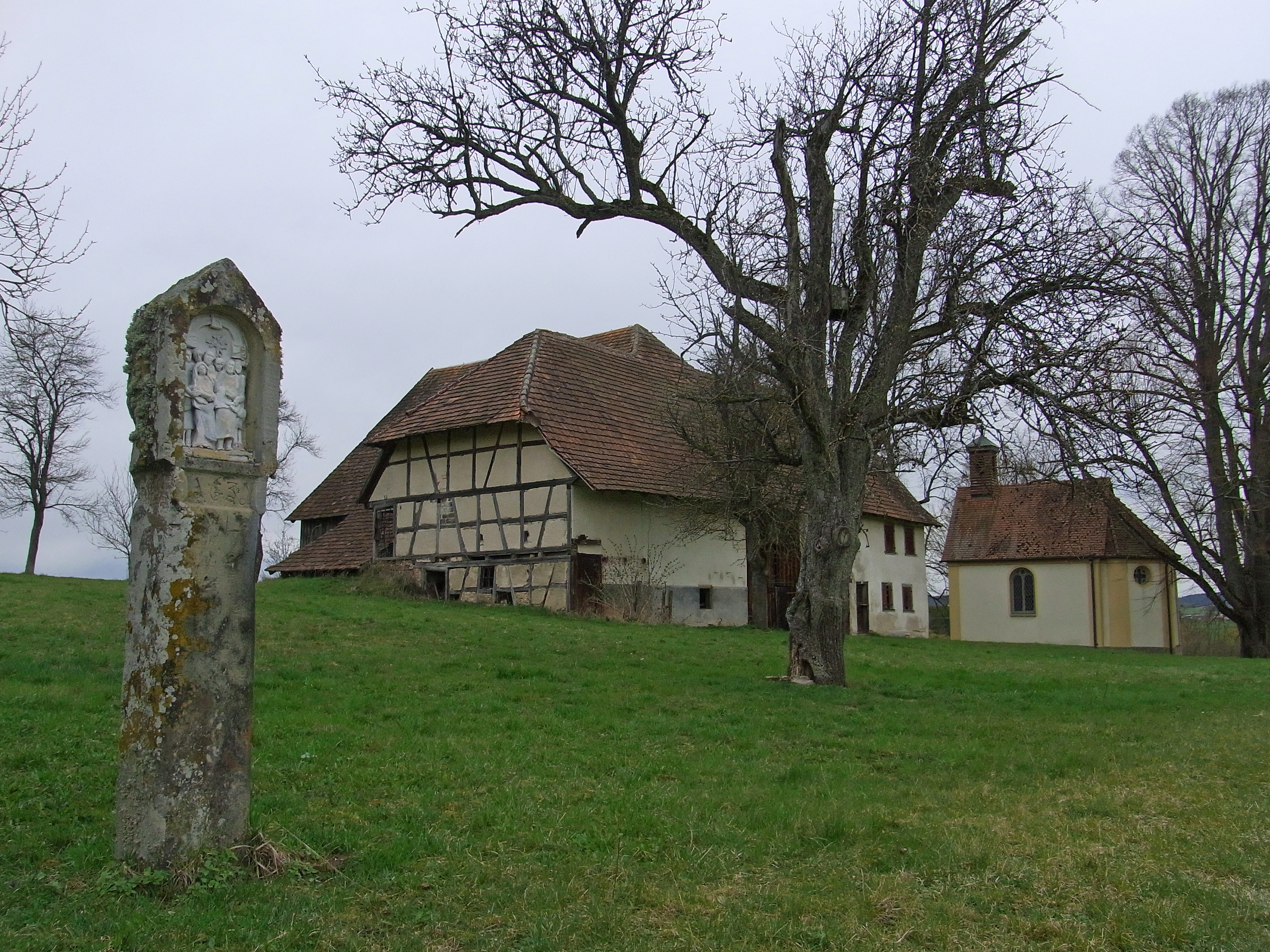
Dietingen-Irslingen-Maria Hochheim

- To Rotenzimmern belonged the village Rotenzimmern and the Bettenberger Hof.

In the hamlet of Irslingen is situated Burgstall Tierstein respectively castle Wildeck.

== Crests of the former municipalities ==
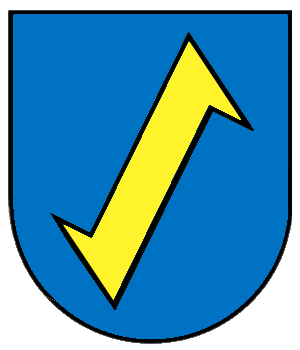
Crest of Boehringen

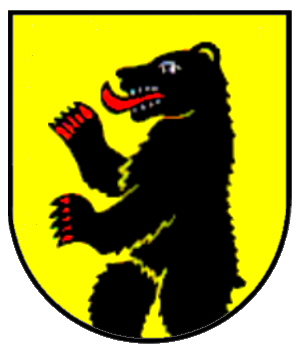
Old crest of Dietingen

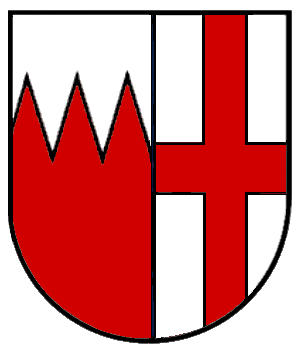
Crest of Goesslingen

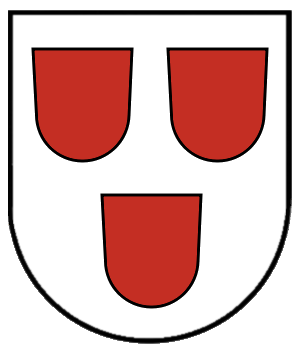
Crest of Irslingen

== Tourism ==
=== Tourist trains on weekends in the summer ===
About Schömberg and Balingen the station Rotenzimmern can be reached over a wheel hiking shuttle from Tübingen. (free bicycle transport on weekends and holidays in the summer). The Hohenzollerische Landesbahn reaches with coupled railcars from Tübingen to Kleinengstingen the Upper Danube Nature Park and continues by bus till the starting point of the Schlichem hiking trail in Tieringen. Since 2015 an early train allows full-day excursions. Less experienced hikers can divide the Schlichem hiking trail in stages.

== Freeman ==
Franz Müller, mayor, received at its adoption in January 1968, the Order of Merit of the Federal Republic of Germany.
