= D5 motorway (Czech Republic) =

Czech motorway

D5 Motorway
- Dálnice D5
- Via Carolina

Route information
- Part of E50
- Length: 151 km (94 mi)

Major junctions
- From: D0 in Prague
- To: German border at Rozvadov

Location
- Country: Czech Republic
- Regions: Prague, Central Bohemian, Plzeň
- Major cities: Prague, Plzeň

Highway system
- Highways in the Czech Republic
| ← D4 | → D6 |

D5 motorway (Czech: Dálnice D5) is a highway in the Czech Republic. It runs from Prague through Plzeň into Germany. D5 is 151 kilometres (94 mi) long. A bypass of Plzeň includes the 380-metre-long (1,250 ft) Valík Tunnel and the 445-metre-long (1,460 ft) bridge over the River Úhlava. In Germany, it continues as the Bundesautobahn 6 to Nuremberg and Mannheim.

The D5 is part of European route E50. The whole motorway from Nuremberg to Prague is called Via Carolina. It forms the only continuous motorway link between the Czech Republic and Bavaria.

== Chronology ==
Construction of the D5 began in 1976, with the first 5.8 km long segment opening in 1982. In 1985, another part, to Beroun was opened. The 29 kilometres (18 mi) of the planned 150 kilometres (93 mi) was already in use in 1989 from Prague to Bavoryně.

The bypass Plzeň, in planning since 1988, faced various challenges. In 1991, the bypass' northern variant was changed to the southern variant that was supposed to use deep notch through the hill of Valík. This started court proceedings that lasted until November 2001, and the construction of the bypass including the tunnel under the hill Valík began after the disputes concluded. The last remaining 3.5 kilometres (2.2 mi) long section around Plzeň, including the Valík tunnel opened on 6 October 2006, and is controlled by a Reliance SCADA system.

This was the last part of the motorway to be constructed as the rest from Plzeň to the Rozvadov-Waidhaus border crossing was already in use since 1997. The final part was opened on 6 October 2006.

=== Future developments ===
The section between Prague and Beroun is planned to be widened to three lanes in each direction.

== Gallery ==
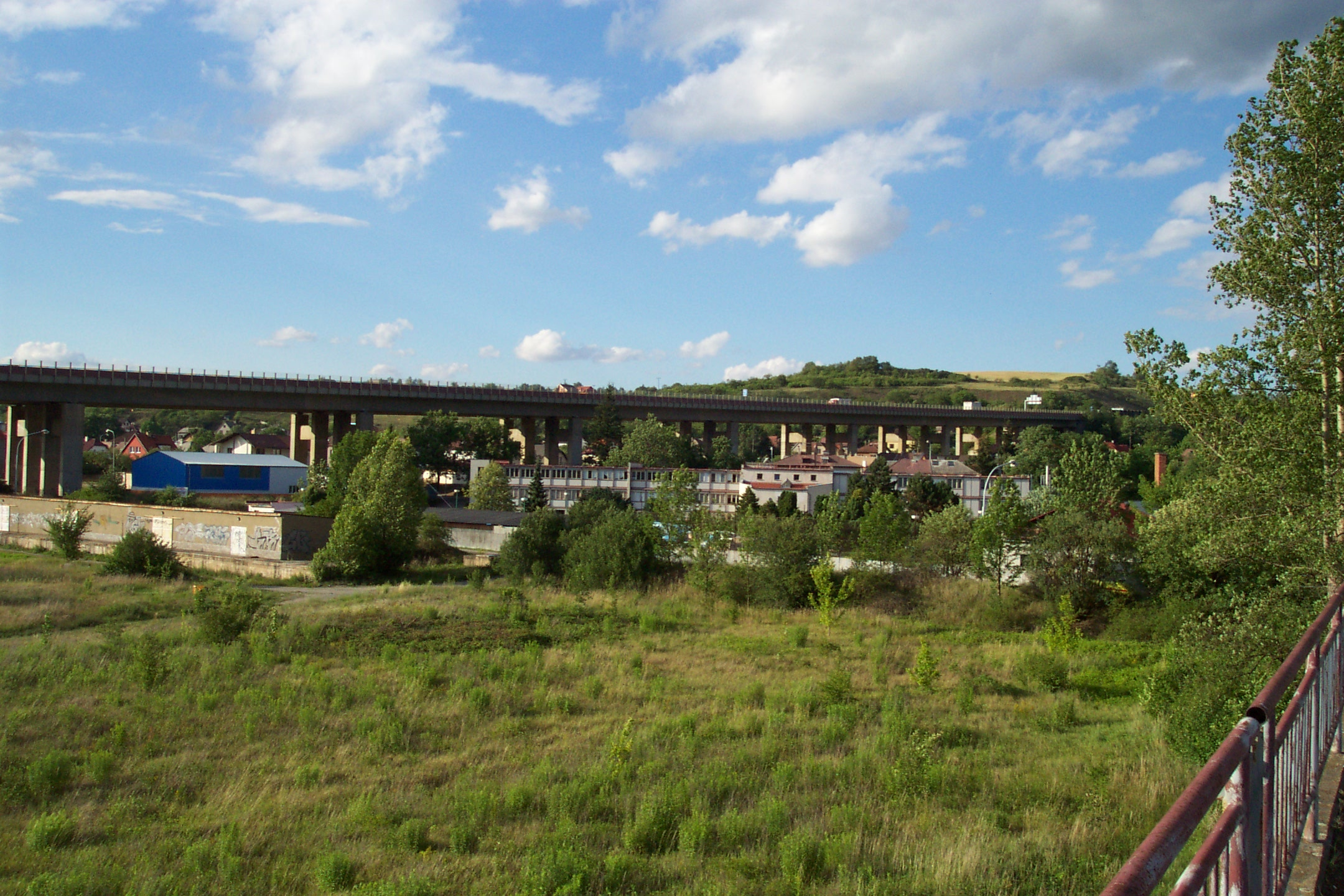
Bridge over Beroun

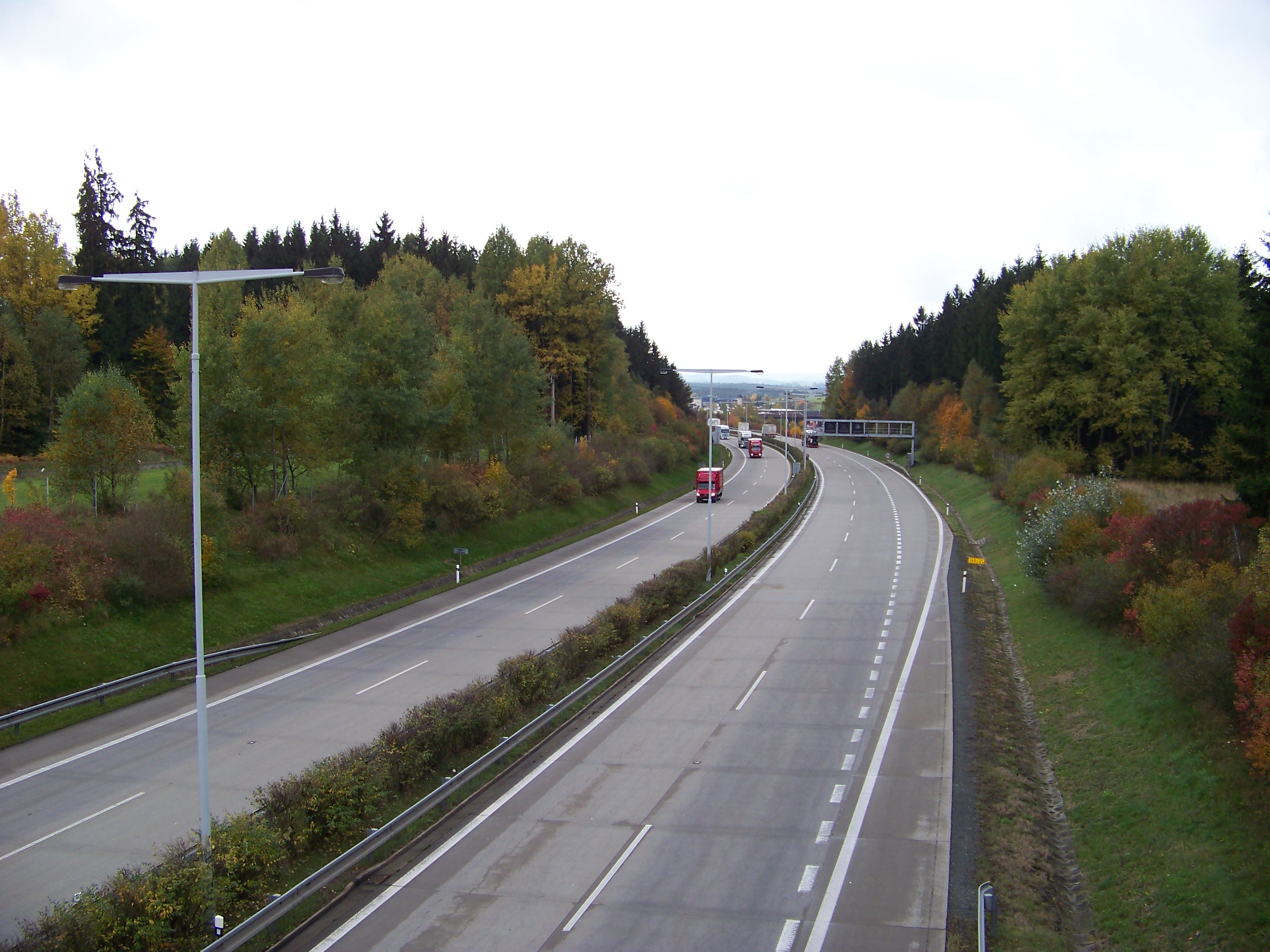
Near borders with Germany

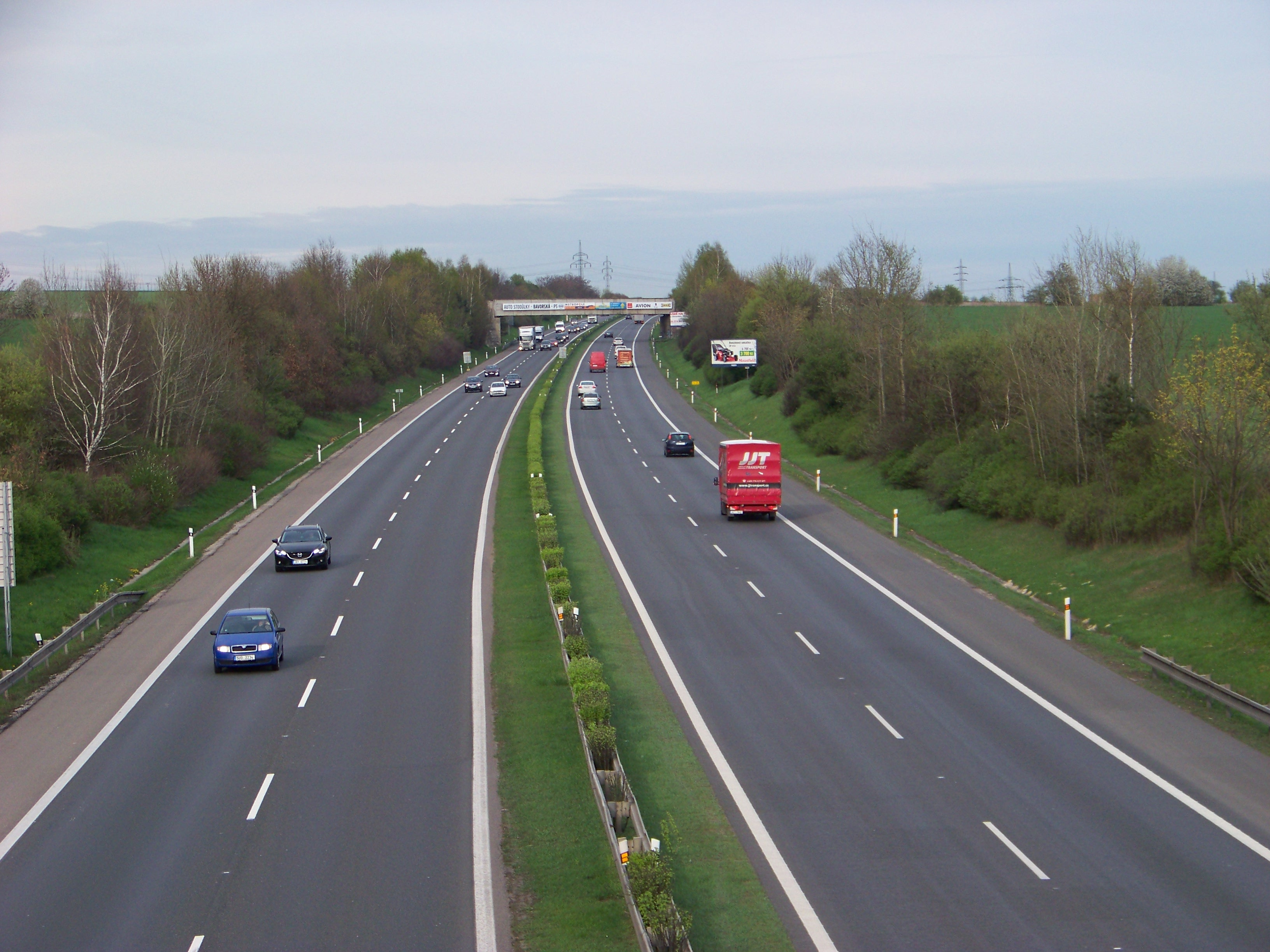
Near Rudná

== Exit list ==
| Country | Region | Location | km | mi | Exit | Name | Destinations | Notes |
|---|---|---|---|---|---|---|---|---|
| Czech Republic | Prague | Prague | 0 | 0.0 | — | Prague-Třebonice | D0 E48 E50 | Kilometrage starting point Start of the electronic toll section |
| Czech Republic | Central Bohemian Region | Central Bohemian Region | | | Rest area | Odpočívka Drahelčice | | |
| Czech Republic | Central Bohemian Region | Central Bohemian Region | | | Rest area | Odpočívka Drahelčice | | |
| Czech Republic | Central Bohemian Region | Central Bohemian Region | 5 | 3.1 | — | Rudná | | |
| Czech Republic | Central Bohemian Region | Central Bohemian Region | 10 | 6.2 | — | Loděnice | | |
| Czech Republic | Central Bohemian Region | Central Bohemian Region | 14 | 8.7 | — | Beroun-východ | | |
| Czech Republic | Central Bohemian Region | Central Bohemian Region | 18 | 11 | — | Beroun-centrum | | |
| Czech Republic | Central Bohemian Region | Central Bohemian Region | 22 | 14 | — | Beroun-západ | | |
| Czech Republic | Central Bohemian Region | Central Bohemian Region | | | Rest area | Odpočívka Počaply | | |
| Czech Republic | Central Bohemian Region | Central Bohemian Region | 28 | 17 | — | Bavoryně | | |
| Czech Republic | Central Bohemian Region | Central Bohemian Region | 34 | 21 | — | Žebrák | | |
| Czech Republic | Central Bohemian Region | Central Bohemian Region | 41 | 25 | — | Cerhovice | | |
| Czech Republic | Plzeň Region | Plzeň Region | 50 | 31 | — | Mýto | | |
| Czech Republic | Plzeň Region | Plzeň Region | | | Rest area | Odpočívka Svojkovice | | Westbound only |
| Czech Republic | Plzeň Region | Plzeň Region | | | Rest area | Odpočívka Rokycany | | Eastbound only |
| Czech Republic | Plzeň Region | Plzeň Region | 62 | 39 | — | Rokycany | | |
| Czech Republic | Plzeň Region | Plzeň Region | 67 | 42 | — | Ejpovice | | |
| Czech Republic | Plzeň Region | Plzeň Region | 73 | 45 | — | Černice | I/20 E49 | |
| Czech Republic | Plzeň Region | Plzeň Region | 76 | 47 | — | Černice | I/20 E49 | |
| Czech Republic | Plzeň Region | Plzeň Region | 80 | 50 | — | Litice | I/27 E53 | |
| Czech Republic | Plzeň Region | Plzeň Region | | | Rest area | Odpočívka Šlovice | | |
| Czech Republic | Plzeň Region | Plzeň Region | 89 | 55 | — | Sulkov | I/26 | |
| Czech Republic | Plzeň Region | Plzeň Region | 100 | 62 | — | Heřmanova Huť | | |
| Czech Republic | Plzeň Region | Plzeň Region | 107 | 66 | — | Ostrov | | |
| Czech Republic | Plzeň Region | Plzeň Region | | | Rest area | Odpočívka Kladruby | | |
| Czech Republic | Plzeň Region | Plzeň Region | 119 | 74 | — | Benešovice | | |
| Czech Republic | Plzeň Region | Plzeň Region | | | Rest area | Odpočívka Málkovice | | |
| Czech Republic | Plzeň Region | Plzeň Region | 128 | 80 | — | Bor | I/21 | |
| Czech Republic | Plzeň Region | Plzeň Region | 136 | 85 | — | Mlýnec | | |
| Czech Republic | Plzeň Region | Plzeň Region | | | Rest area | Odpočívka Kateřina | | |
| Czech Republic | Plzeň Region | Plzeň Region | 144 | 89 | — | Kateřina | | End of electronic toll section |
| Czech Republic | Plzeň Region | Plzeň Region | | | Rest area | Odpočívka Rozvadov | | |
| Czech Republic | Plzeň Region | Plzeň Region | 151 | 94 | — | Rozvadov-Waidhaus border crossing | A 6 E50 | Kilometrage end point Road continues as the German A6 |
1.000 mi = 1.609 km; 1.000 km = 0.621 mi: Route transition
