= Untermünkheim =

- Municipality
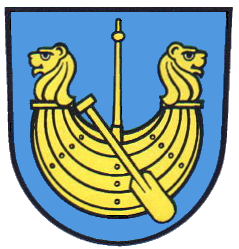
- Coat of arms

- Location of Untermünkheim within Schwäbisch Hall district
- Interactive map of Untermünkheim
- Location within Germany Location within Baden-Württemberg
- Coordinates: 49°09′12″N 09°44′05″E
- Country: Germany
- State: Baden-Württemberg
- Admin. region: Stuttgart
- District: Schwäbisch Hall

Government
  - Mayor (2020–28): Matthias Klocke

Area
  - Total: 27.14 km^{2} (10.48 sq mi)
- Elevation: 261 m (856 ft)

Population (2025-12-31)
  - Total: 3,102
  - Density: 114.3/km^{2} (296.0/sq mi)
- Time zone: UTC+01:00 (CET)
  - Summer (DST): UTC+02:00 (CEST)
- Postal codes: 74547
- Dialling codes: 0791
- Vehicle registration: SHA
- Website: www.untermuenkheim.de

Untermünkheim (German pronunciation: [ʊntɐˈmyŋkhaɪ̯m]) is a town in the district of Schwäbisch Hall in Baden-Württemberg in Germany.
