= Theodor Heuss Bridge (Frankenthal) =

Coordinates: 49°32′55″N 8°25′03″E

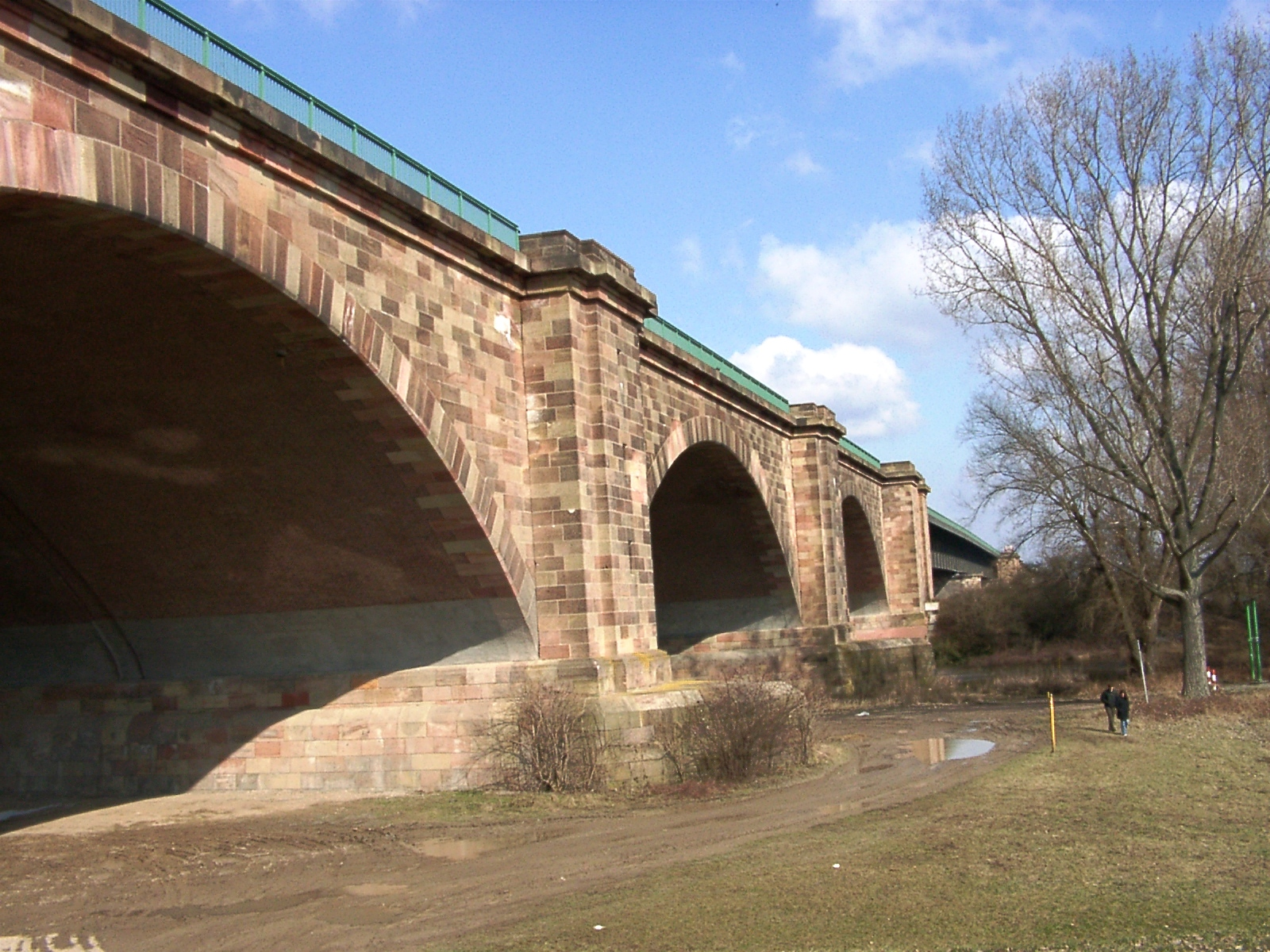
Theodor Heuss Bridge as seen from Frankenthal

The Theodor-Heuss-Rhine River Bridge (Theodor-Heuss-Rheinbrücke) also known as the Autobahnbrücke Frankenthal (Autobahn Bridge, Frankenthal) is a bridge that spans the Rhine River along Autobahn 6 and connects the regions of Rhineland-Palatinate with Baden-Wuerttemberg. The four-lane bridge crosses the upper Rhine north of the cities of Ludwigshafen and Mannheim in an east-west direction on the motorway connecting Saarbrücken, Kaiserslautern, Mannheim, and Viernheim. The length of the entire span, which consists of the main river span and two land spans, is over a kilometer long. The land span on the western side is somewhat longer, because the west bank is flatter than the east.

The bridge construction began in 1938. On 12 December 1940, a major accident occurred when the frame collapsed. The construction was then suspended because of the Second World War. Work on the bridge resumed in 1948 and was completed in 1964.

The bridge has no shoulders along the roadway which results in kilometer-long traffic jams during maintenance work and after accidents. A walkway is available along the center of the bridge that allows walkers and cyclists to cross the Rhine. Staircases in each bridge abutment allow access to the walkway.
