= European route E41 =

Road in trans-European E-road network

E41

Route information
- Length: 788 km (490 mi)

Major junctions
- North end: Dortmund, Germany
- South end: Altdorf, Switzerland

Location
- Countries: Germany; Switzerland

Highway system
- International E-road network; A Class; B Class

European route E41 is a road that is part of the E-route in Europe. Its route is Dortmund - Hagen - Olpe - Siegen - Wetzlar - Hanau - Aschaffenburg - Würzburg - Heilbronn - Stuttgart - Böblingen - Herrenberg - Villingen-Schwenningen - Bad Dürrheim - Singen - Schaffhausen - Winterthur - Zürich - Schwyz - Altdorf.

== Route ==
- Germany
- A 45 Dortmund - Witten - Hagen - Lüdenscheid - Olpe - Siegen - Herborn - Wetzlar - Gießen - Hanau
- A 45 A 66 Hanau
- A 45 Hanau - Kleinostheim
- A 3 Kleinostheim - Aschaffenburg - Wertheim - Würzburg
- A 81 Würzburg - Heilbronn - Bietigheim-Bissingen - Ludwigsburg - Leonberg - Stuttgart
- A 81 A 8 Stuttgart
- A 81 Stuttgart - Sindelfingen - Herrenberg - Rottenburg am Neckar - Villingen-Schwenningen - Singen
- B 34 Singen - (Germany) / (Switzerland) border crossing
