= Witthoh =

Hill chain in Baden-Württemberg, Germany

Coordinates: 47°56′10″N 8°49′36″E

Highest point
- Elevation: 862 m (2,828 ft)

Geography
- Location: Baden-Württemberg, Germany

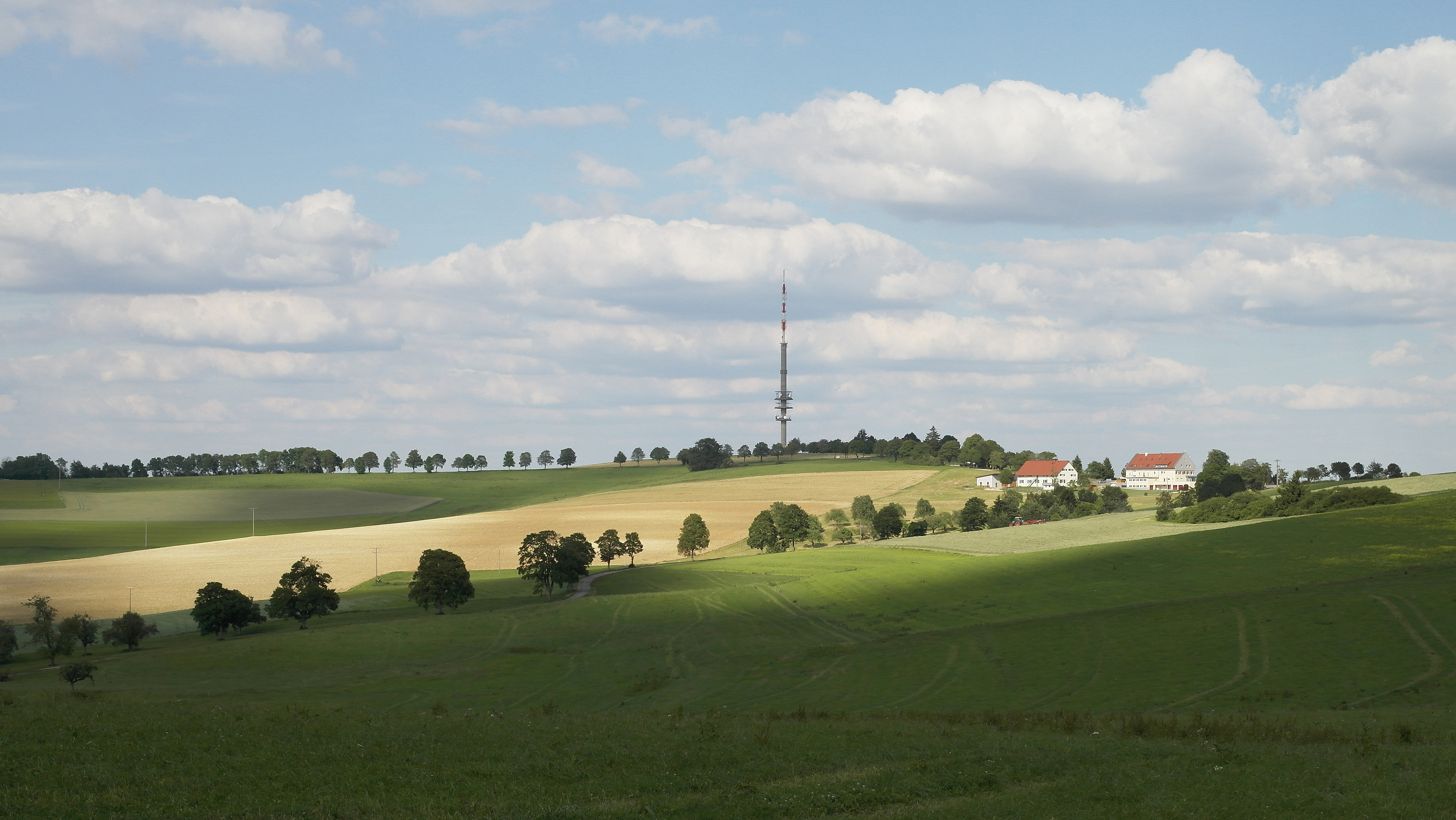
Witthoh

Witthoh is a mountain of Baden-Württemberg, Germany.
