= Georgenberg, Neustadt =

Georgenberg
- Municipality
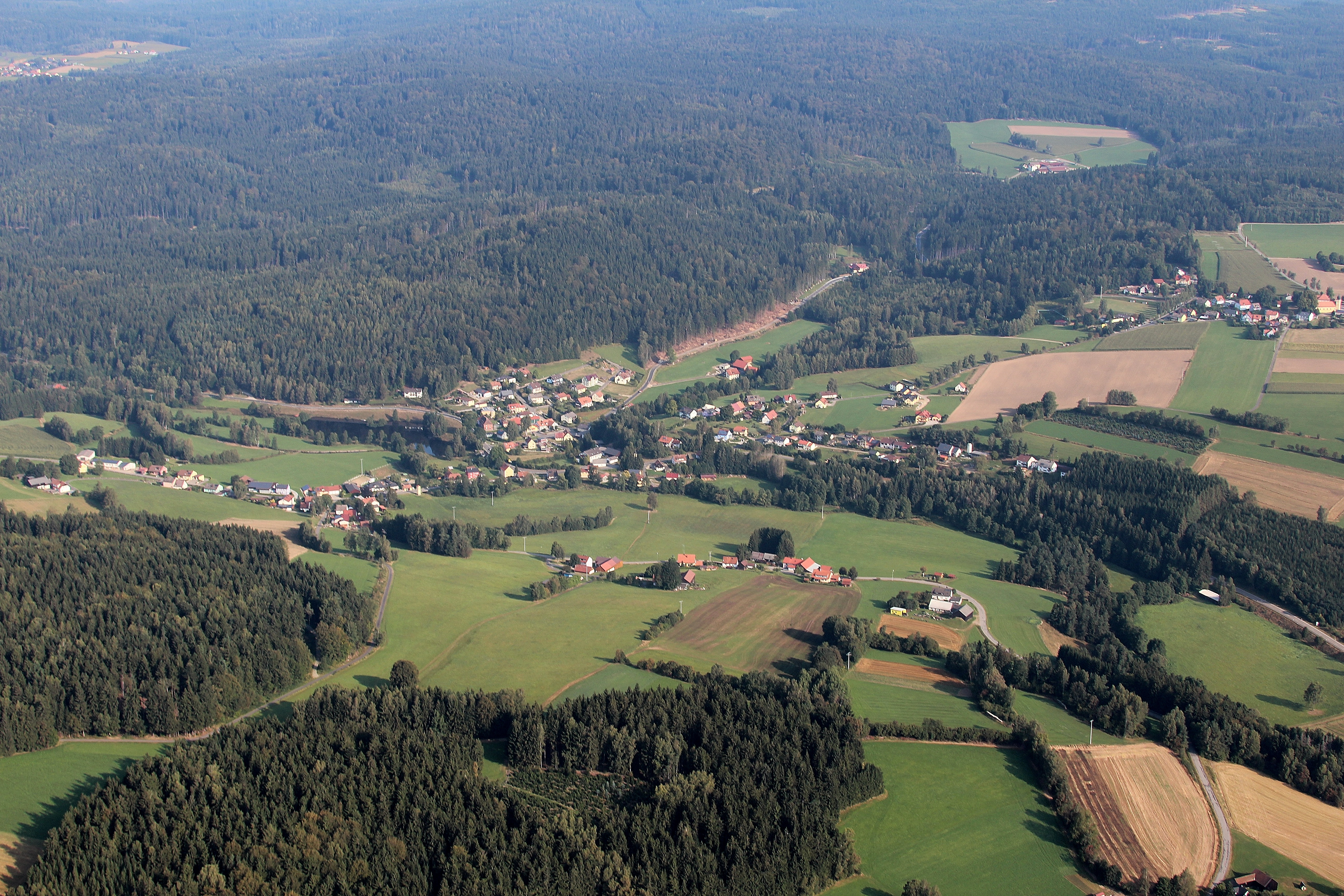
- Aerial view of Georgenberg

- Coat of arms

- Location of Georgenberg within Neustadt a.d.Waldnaab district
- Interactive map of Georgenberg
- Location within Germany Location within Bavaria
- Coordinates: 49°42′N 12°25′E
- Country: Germany
- State: Bavaria
- Admin. region: Oberpfalz
- District: Neustadt a.d.Waldnaab
- Municipal assoc.: Pleystein
- Subdivisions: 28 Ortsteile

Government
  - Mayor (2020–26): Marina Hirnet (CSU)

Area
  - Total: 33.43 km^{2} (12.91 sq mi)
- Elevation: 600 m (2,000 ft)

Population (2025-12-31)
  - Total: 1,266
  - Density: 37.87/km^{2} (98.08/sq mi)
- Time zone: UTC+01:00 (CET)
  - Summer (DST): UTC+02:00 (CEST)
- Postal codes: 92697
- Dialling codes: 09658
- Vehicle registration: NEW
- Website: www.georgenberg.de

Georgenberg is a municipality in the district of Neustadt an der Waldnaab in Bavaria in Germany, on the border with the Czech Republic.
