= Bundesautobahn 6 =

Federal motorway in Germany

A 6
- Bundesautobahn 6
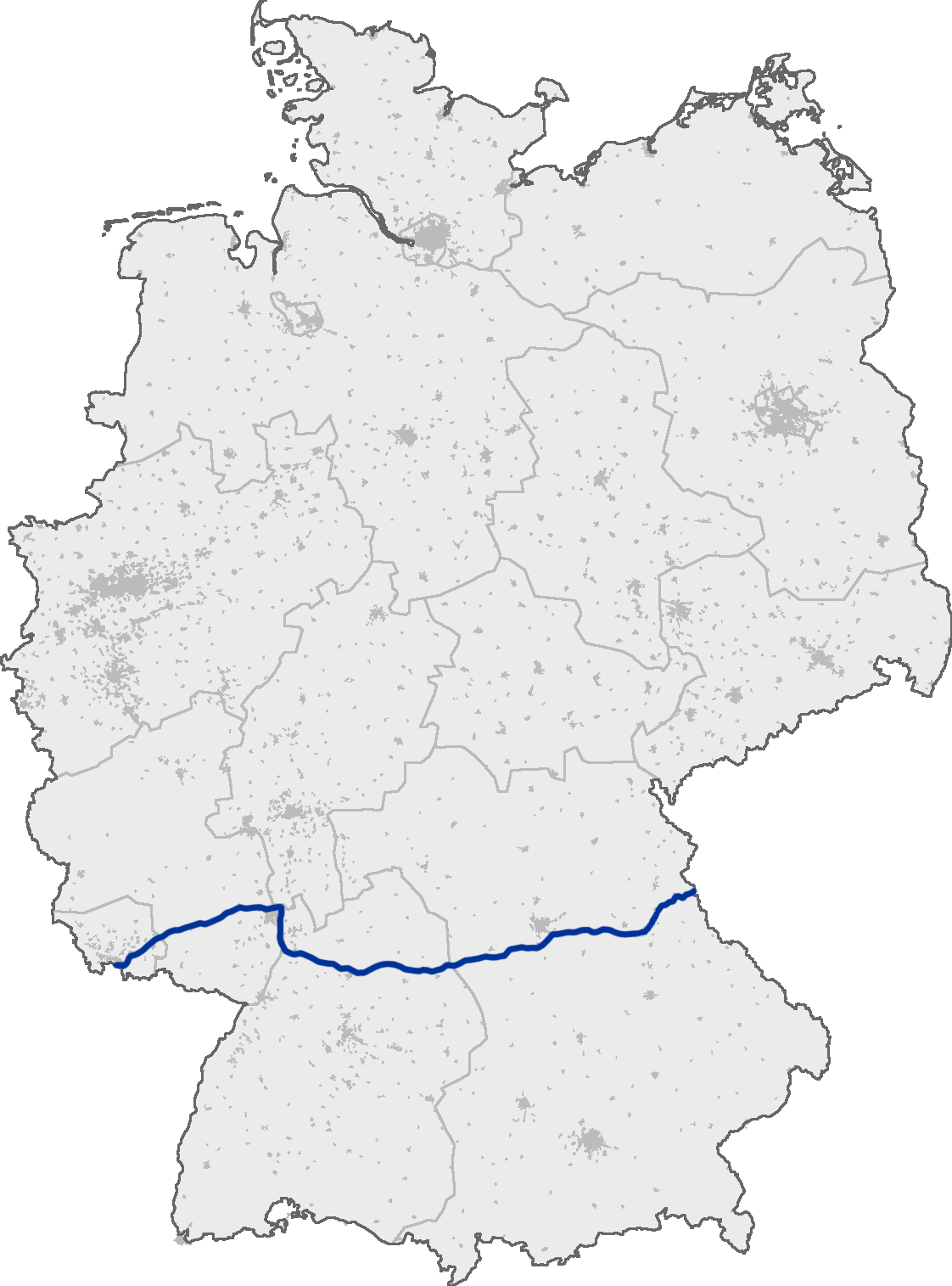

Route information
- Length: 477 km (296 mi)

Major junctions
- West end: French border near Saarbrücken
- East end: Czech border near Waidhaus

Location
- Country: Germany
- States: Saarland, Rhineland-Palatinate, Hesse, Baden-Württemberg, Bavaria

Highway system
- Roads in Germany; Autobahns; List; Federal; List; State; E-roads
← A 5	→ A 7

Bundesautobahn 6 (translates from German as Federal Motorway 6, short form Autobahn 6, abbreviated as BAB 6 or A 6), also known as Via Carolina (between Nuremberg and the Czech border continuing to Prague - by Czech motorway D5) is a 477 km (296.4 mi) long German autobahn. It starts at the French border near Saarbrücken in the west and ends at the Czech border near Waidhaus in the east.

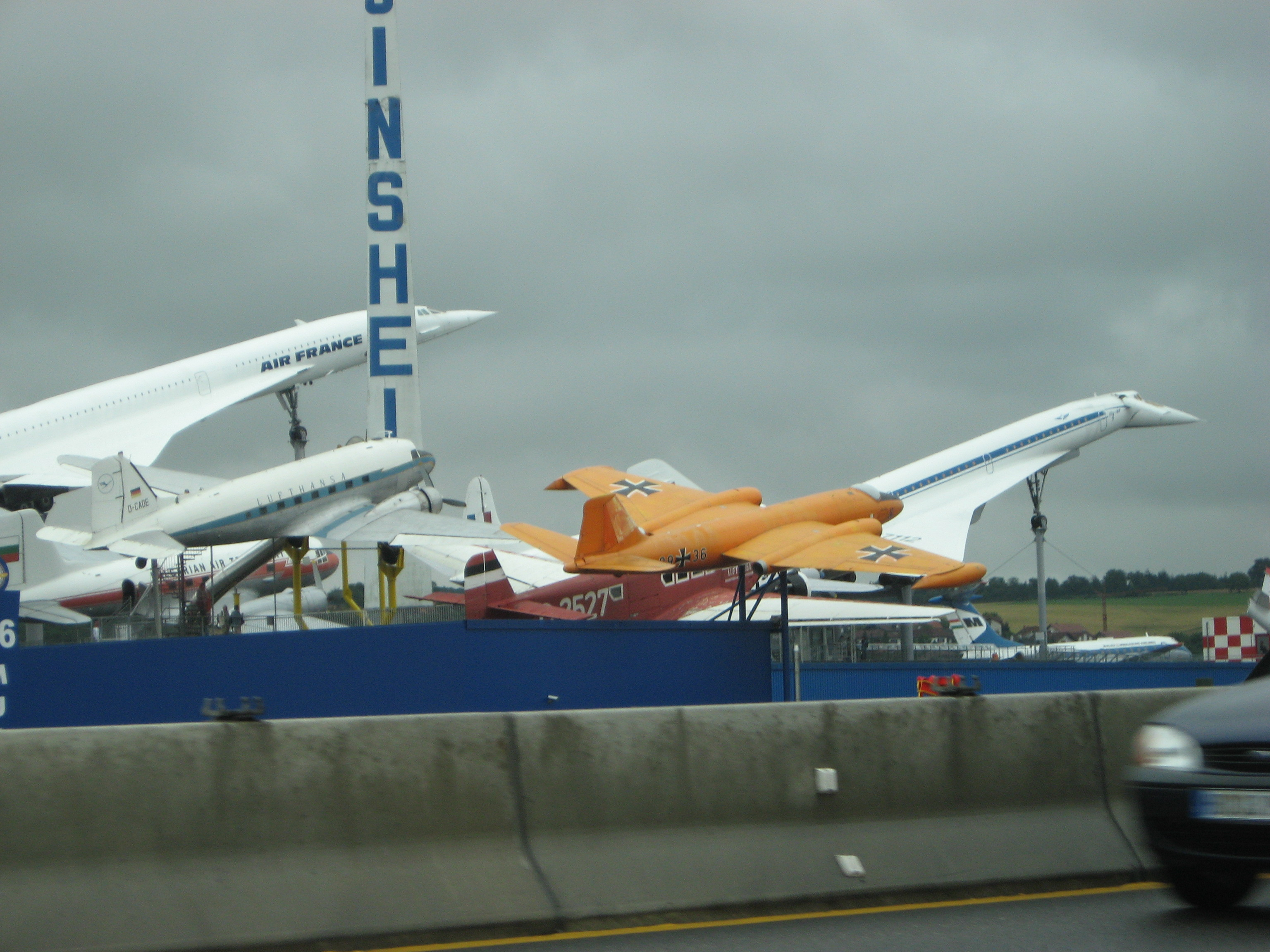
Technik Museum Sinsheim seen from the A6.

The first plans for the A 6 were laid out in 1935; construction on several parts began in 1938. In 1940, construction near Mannheim was stopped when the bridge across the Rhine collapsed, killing many workers. A new bridge, the Theodor Heuss Bridge (Frankenthal), was opened in 1953. Other parts of the A 6 were completed in 1941. A part near Kaiserslautern was used as an airstrip by the Luftwaffe during World War II. After the war, it was taken over by US forces and became the Ramstein Air Base, while the A 6 was re-built south of the air base.

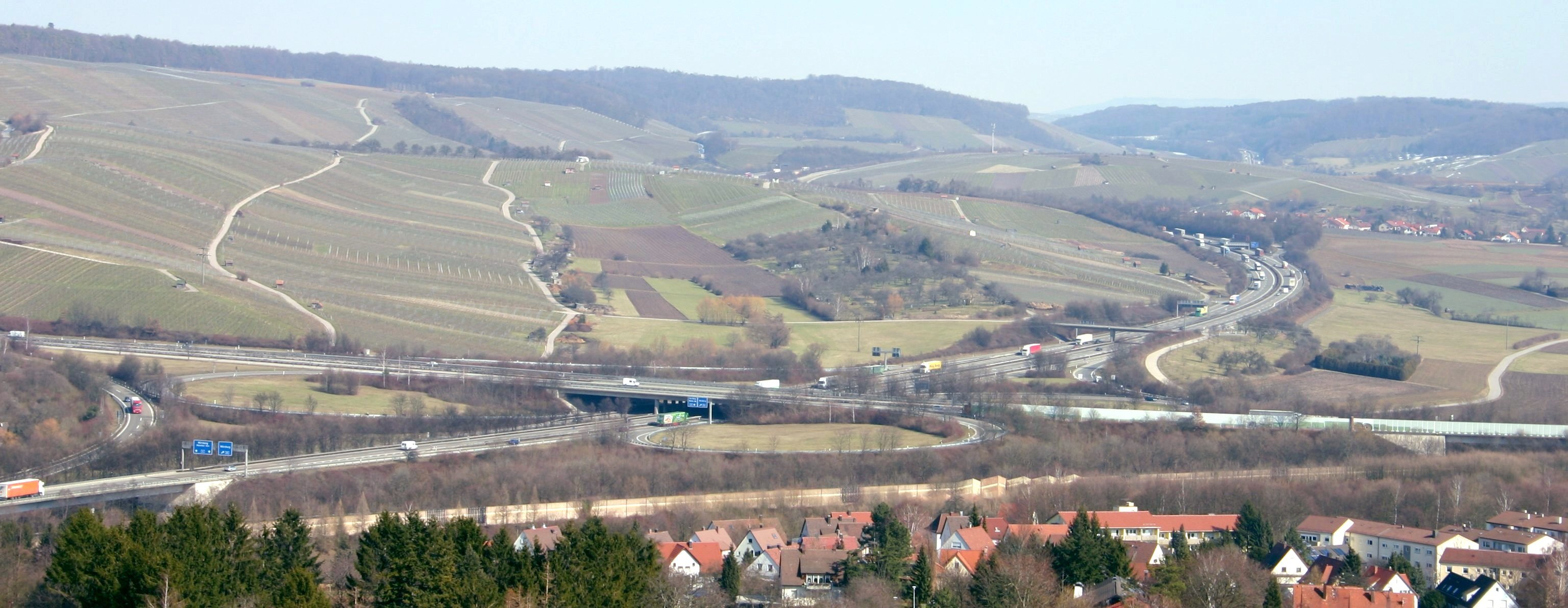
Weinsberg intersection of the A 6 and A 81. The A 6 runs from bottom-left to top-right.

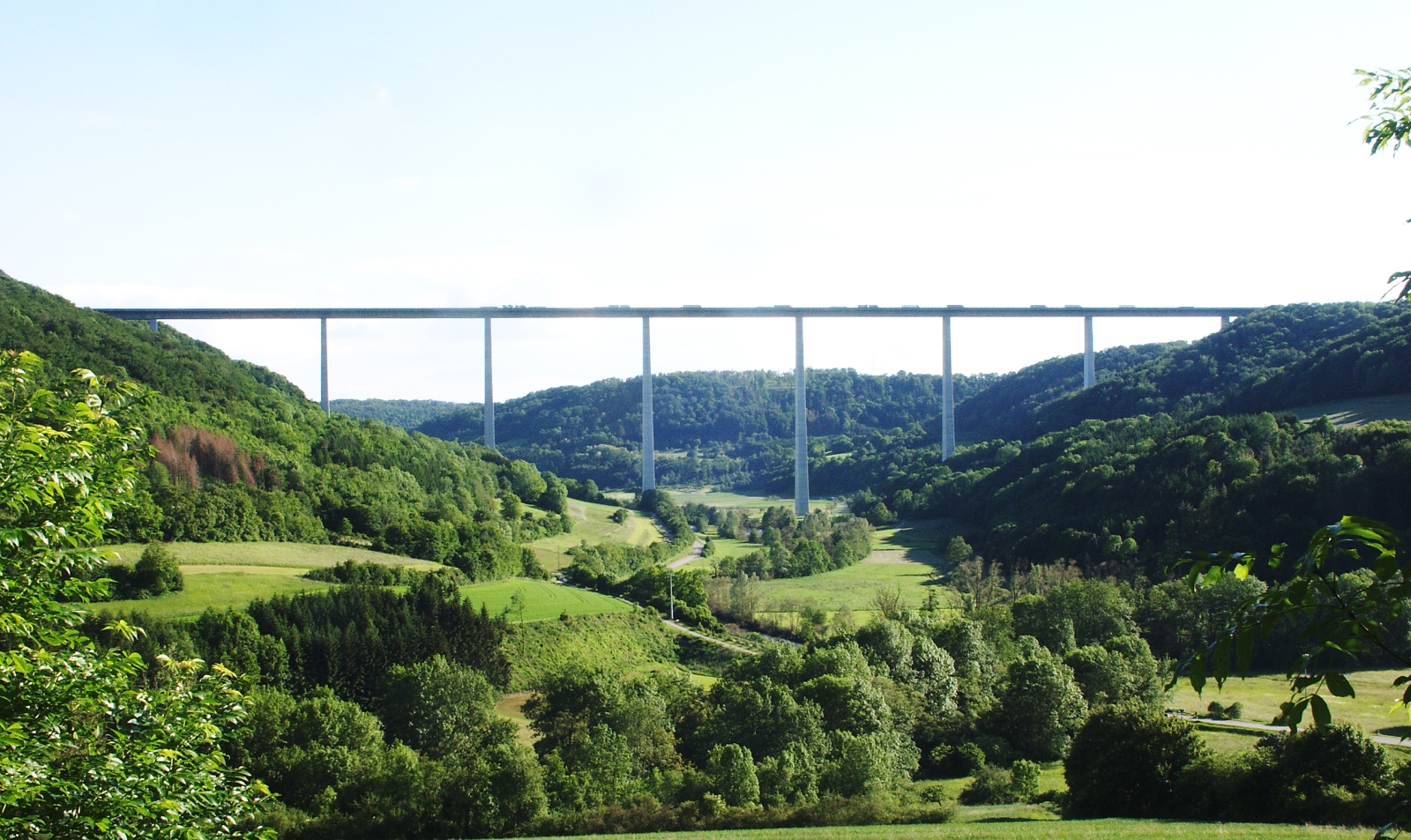
Kocher Viaduct

In the 1960s, construction was continued. One new section cut through the Hockenheimring, requiring a major redesign of the race track which resulted in the construction of the Motodrom stadium.

Much like its southern counterpart, the A 8, the A 6 is relatively old and has received little upgrading, making it difficult for it to handle today's traffic. The section around Mannheim is currently being widened and modernised from a four-lane to a six-lane motorway requiring the construction of a new bridge over the River Neckar.

The Autobahn 6 crosses the Kocher valley between Heilbronn and Nuremberg via the Kocher viaduct (German: Kochertalbrücke) near Schwäbisch Hall. With its maximum height of 185 m (607 ft) above the valley bottom, it is the highest viaduct in Germany.

The direct motorway connection between Prague and Paris was completed when the last missing section between junction Amberg-Ost and interchange Oberpfälzer Wald was inaugurated on 10 September 2008.
