= European route E51 =

Road in trans-European E-road network

E51

Route information
- Length: 410 km (250 mi)

Major junctions
- North end: Berlin
- South end: Nuremberg

Location
- Countries: Germany

Highway system
- International E-road network; A Class; B Class

European route E 51 is a road that is part of the International E-road network. It connects Berlin and Nuremberg in Germany. It is 410 km (250 mi) long.

== Route ==
Berlin - Leipzig - Gera - Hirschberg - Hof - Bayreuth - Nuremberg
