= Pleystein =

- Town
- Coat of arms

- Location of Pleystein within Neustadt a.d.Waldnaab district
- Interactive map of Pleystein
- Location within Germany Location within Bavaria
- Coordinates: 49°39′N 12°25′E
- Country: Germany
- State: Bavaria
- Admin. region: Oberpfalz
- District: Neustadt a.d.Waldnaab
- Municipal assoc.: Pleystein

Government
  - Mayor (2020–26): Rainer Rewitzer (CSU)

Area
  - Total: 42.4 km^{2} (16.4 sq mi)
- Elevation: 548 m (1,798 ft)

Population (2025-12-31)
  - Total: 2,321
  - Density: 54.7/km^{2} (142/sq mi)
- Time zone: UTC+01:00 (CET)
  - Summer (DST): UTC+02:00 (CEST)
- Postal codes: 92714
- Dialling codes: 09654
- Vehicle registration: NEW
- Website: www.pleystein.de

Pleystein (German: [ˈplaɪʃtaɪn]) is a municipality in the district of Neustadt an der Waldnaab, in Bavaria, Germany. It is situated 18 km east of Weiden in der Oberpfalz, and 11 km west of Rozvadov.
