= Rozvadov =

- Municipality
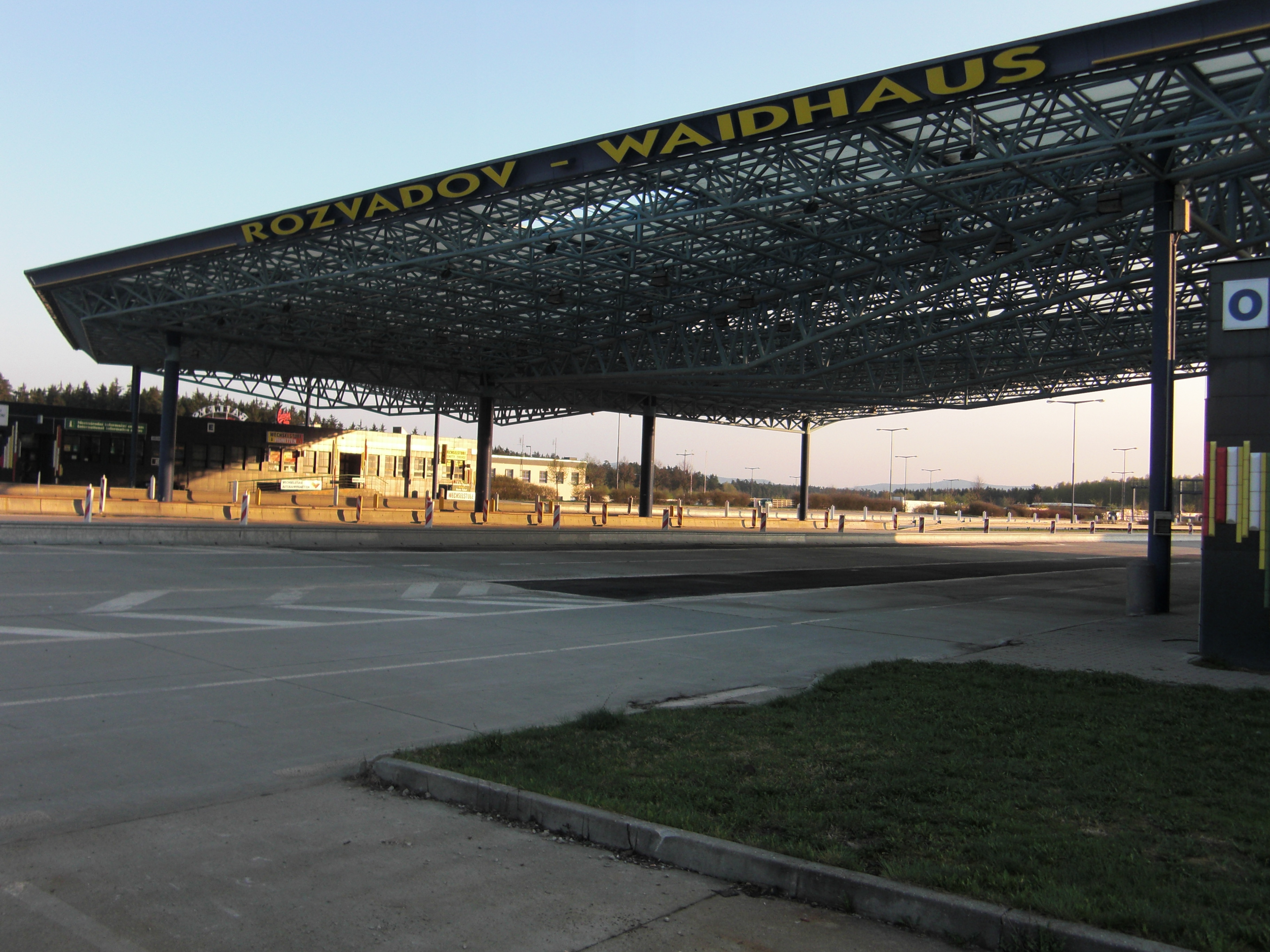
- Rozvadov / Waidhaus border crossing

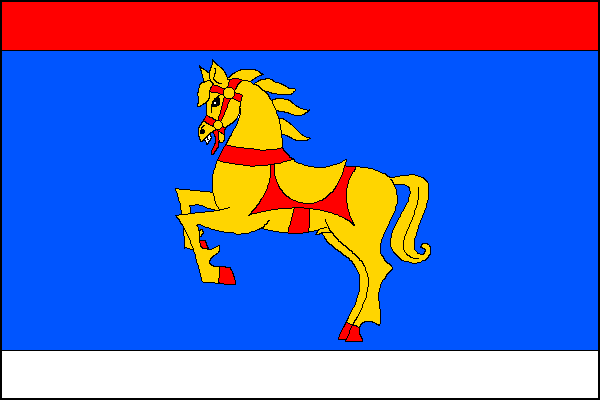
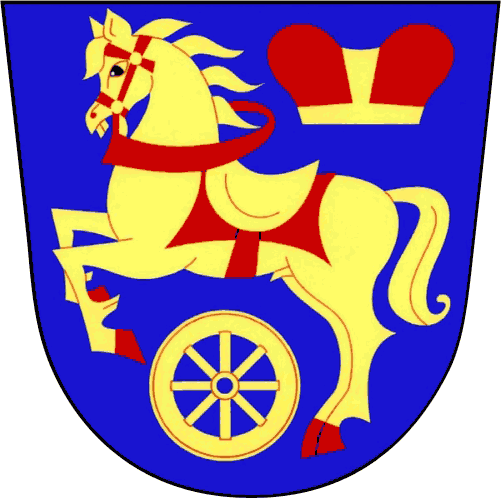
- Flag Coat of arms

- Location in the Czech Republic
- Coordinates: 49°40′6″N 12°33′7″E
- Country: Czech Republic
- Region: Plzeň
- District: Tachov
- First mentioned: 1581

Area
  - Total: 54.94 km^{2} (21.21 sq mi)
- Elevation: 570 m (1,870 ft)

Population (2026-01-01)
  - Total: 858
  - Density: 15.6/km^{2} (40.4/sq mi)
- Time zone: UTC+1 (CET)
  - Summer (DST): UTC+2 (CEST)
- Postal code: 348 07
- Website: www.rozvadov.cz

Rozvadov (Czech pronunciation: [ˈrozvadof]; German: Roßhaupt) is a municipality and village in Tachov District in the Plzeň Region of the Czech Republic. It has about 900 inhabitants. Located on the Czech–German border, the municipality is known for one of the busiest road border crossings in the country. Rozvadov is also known for King's Resort Rozvadov, one of the largest casinos in Central Europe.

== Administrative division ==
Rozvadov consists of six municipal parts (in brackets population according to the 2021 census):

- Rozvadov (607)
- Diana (13)
- Milíře (13)
- Nové Domky (18)
- Rozcestí (12)
- Svatá Kateřina (67)

== Etymology ==
The name is derived from the personal name Rozvad, meaning "Rozvad's (court)".

== Geography ==
Rozvadov is located about 15 kilometres (9 mi) southwest of Tachov, 59 km (37 mi) west of Plzeň, on the border with Germany. It lies in the central part of the Upper Palatine Forest. The highest point is below the summit of the hill Javorný vrch, at 674 m (2,211 ft) above sea level.

== History ==
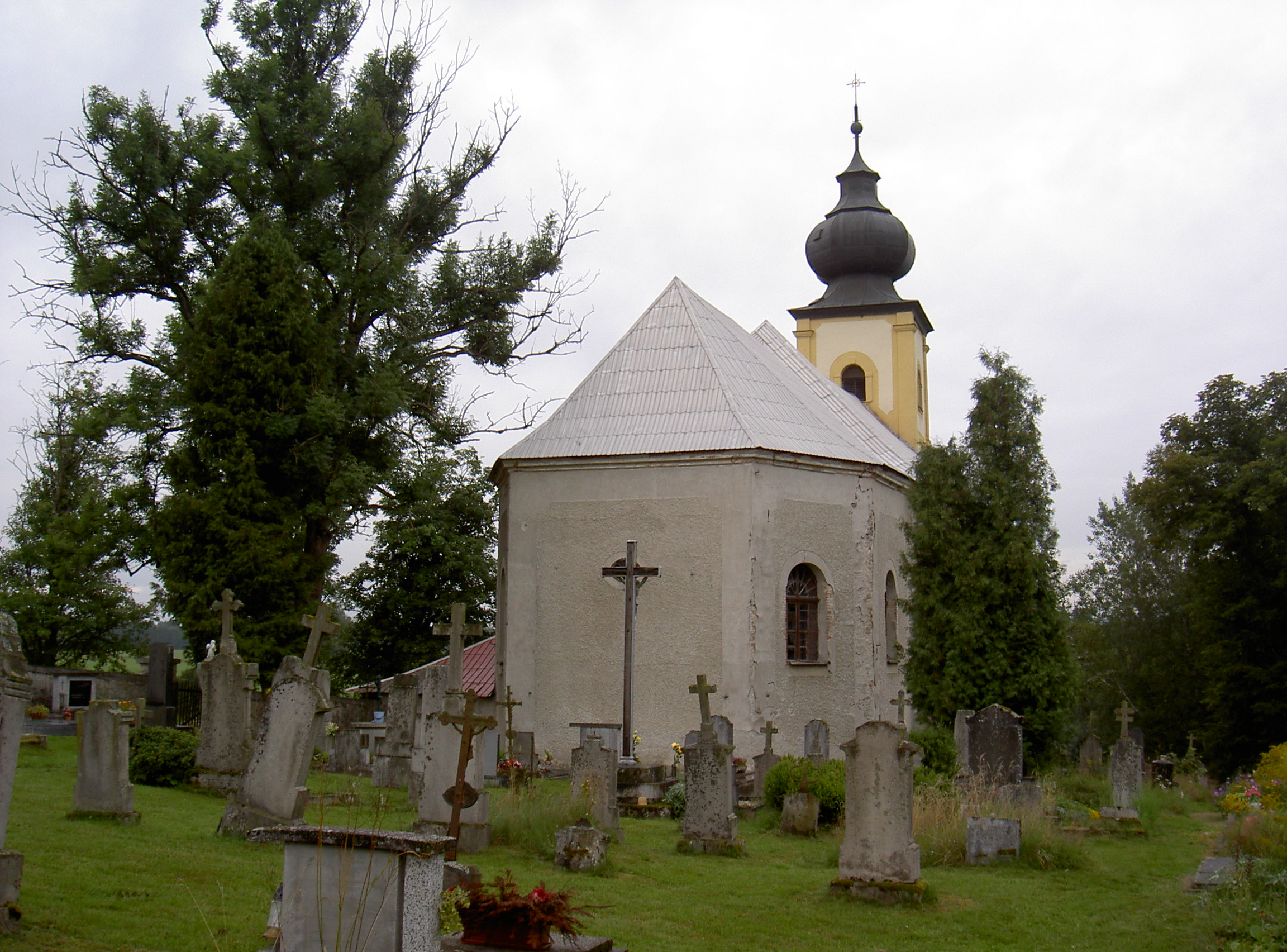
Church of Saint Catherine in Svatá Kateřina

The first written mention of Rozvadov is from 1581. The customs office is first mentioned in 1613. The current customhouse is a building from 1934.

Before the expulsion of Germans in the wake of World War II, the municipality had a German-speaking majority.

== Demographics ==
Historical population

Year	Pop.	±%
1869	3,410	—
1880	3,445	+1.0%
1890	3,255	−5.5%
1900	3,171	−2.6%
1910	3,106	−2.0%

Year	Pop.	±%
1921	3,261	+5.0%
1930	2,991	−8.3%
1950	789	−73.6%
1961	862	+9.3%
1970	889	+3.1%

Year	Pop.	±%
1980	746	−16.1%
1991	652	−12.6%
2001	684	+4.9%
2011	773	+13.0%
2021	730	−5.6%

Source: Censuses

== Economy ==
Rozvadov is known for King's Resort Rozvadov. It contains the largest poker room in Europe.

== Transport ==
Rozvadov is known for its important road border crossing with Germany Rozvadov / Waidhaus, located on the D5 motorway. It is one of the busiest road border crossings in the Czech Republic.

== Sights ==
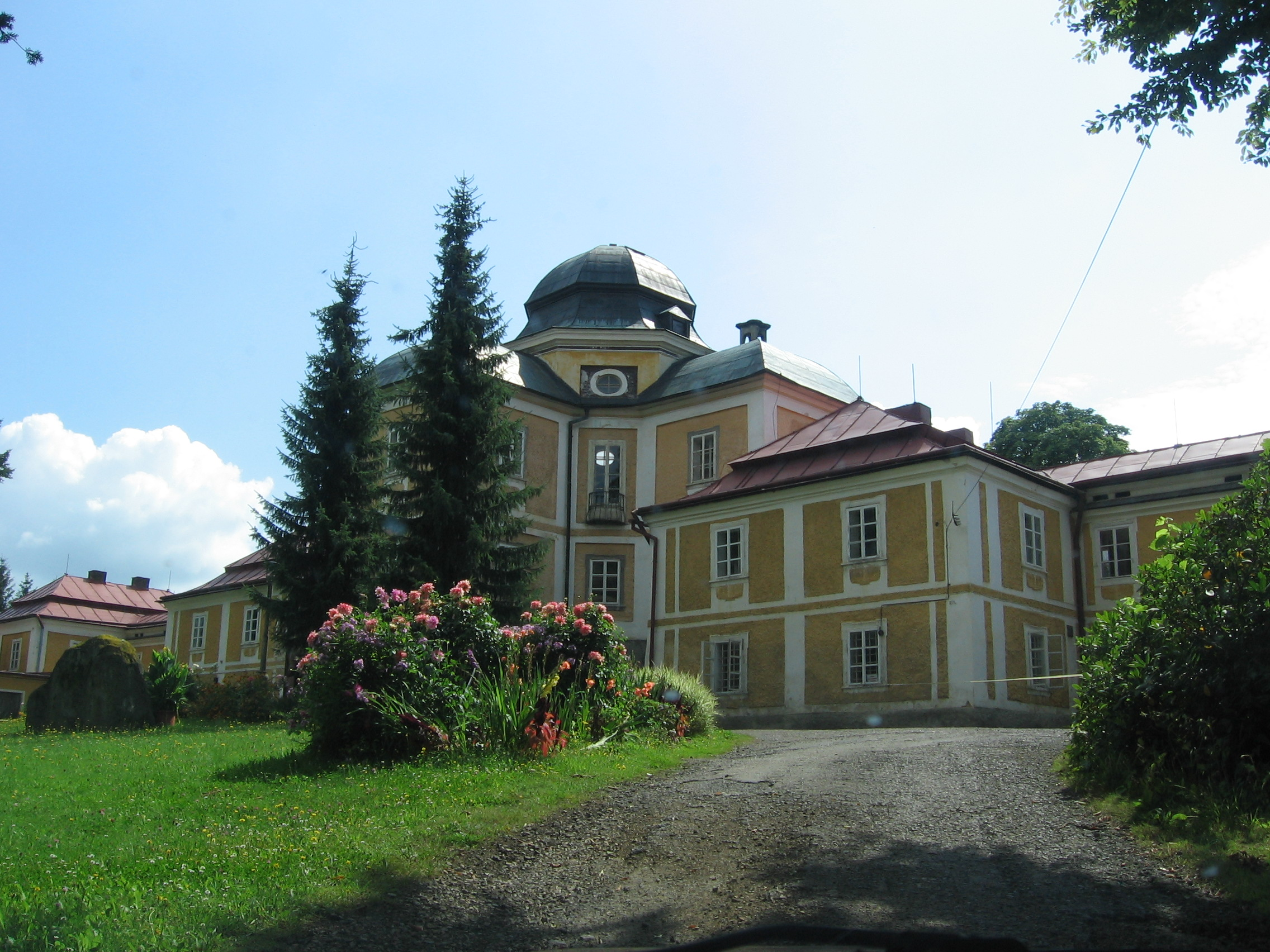
Diana Castle

The most valuable monument is the Church of Saint Catherine in Svatá Kateřina. It was built in the Baroque style in the first half of the 18th century, on the site of a Gothic provostship with the chapel of the Virgin Mary.

The Church of the Visitation of the Virgin Mary is located in Nové Domky. It is a rare example of a church built purely in the Empire style. It dates from 1836. The building is dilapidated and unused, but is gradually repaired.

The village of Diana is known for Diana Castle. It is a Baroque hunting lodge built before 1732 and modified in the Neoclassical style. It was built for the Kolowrat family and named after Diana, the goddess of hunters. Next to the castle is a park. Today the building is privately owned and unused.
