= Bundesautobahn 72 =

Federal motorway in Germany

A 72
- Bundesautobahn 72

Route information
- Length: 170 km (110 mi)

Major junctions
- North end: Bundesautobahn 36 in Markkleeberg, Saxony
- South end: Bundesautobahn 9 in Selbitz, Bavaria

Location
- Country: Germany
- States: Bavaria, Saxony

Highway system
- Roads in Germany; Autobahns; List; Federal; List; State; E-roads
← A 71	→ A 73

Bundesautobahn 72 (translates from German as Federal Motorway 72, short form Autobahn 72, abbreviated as BAB 72 or A 72) is a motorway in Germany. The construction of the autobahn started in the 1930s, but was halted by the outbreak of World War II. Due to the division of Germany, a part of the autobahn lay in ruins until after German reunification.

== Exit list ==
	(1)	Bayerisches Vogtland 3-way interchange A 9 E51 E441
	(2)	Hof-Nord B 173
		Brücke
		Saalebrücke 268 m
	(3)	Hof / Töpen B 2
	(4)	Hochfranken 3-way interchange A 93
		Rest area Großzöbern
		Elstertalbrücke Pirk 504 m
	(5)	Pirk B 173
		Services Vogtland
	(6)	Plauen-Süd B 92 E49
		Services Vogtland
		Frissenbachtalbrücke 203 m
	(7)	Plauen-Ost B 173
		Rest area Neuensalz
		Talbrücke Pöhl 373 m
	(8)	Treuen
		Göltzschtalbrücke 364 m
	(9)	Reichenbach B 94
		Rest area Waldkirchen
	(10)	Zwickau-West
		Rest area Niedercrinitz
		Talbrücke Culitzsch
		Talbrücke Wilkau-Haßlau
	(11)	Zwickau-Ost
	(12)	Hartenstein
		Rest area Beuthenbach
	(13)	Stollberg-West B 169 B 180
	(14)	Stollberg-Nord B 169
		Rest area Am Neukirchener Wald
Kreuz	(15)	Chemnitz-Süd interchange B 173
	(16)	Chemnitz-Rottluff
	(17)	Kreuz Chemnitz 4-way interchange A 4 E40 E441
		Talbrücke Pleißenbach
	(18)	Chemnitz-Röhrsdorf
	(19)	Hartmannsdorf
		Mühlbachtalbrücke 195 m
		Rest area Am Mühlbachtal
	(20)	Niederfrohna
		Lochmühlentalbrücke 373 m
		Brücke überdie Zwickauer Mulde 710 m
		Bahnstrecke
	(21)	Penig B 175
		Rest area (planned)
		Rattentalbrücke 70 m
	(22)	Rochlitz B 175
		Ossabachtalbrücke 217 m
	(23)	Geithain B 7
		Frohburg (planned)
		Talbrücke Zedtlitzer Grund
	(25)	Borna-Süd
	(26)	Borna-Nord B 176
	(27)	Espenhain
	(28)	Rötha
		Böhlen (under construction) B 2 B 186
	(30)	Leipzig-Süd 4-way interchange A 38
B 2		Road continues as the B 2 into Leipzig
