= List of roads in Saxony =

This lists autobahns, federal roads, ancient roads and scenic routes in Saxony, Germany.

== Autobahns ==
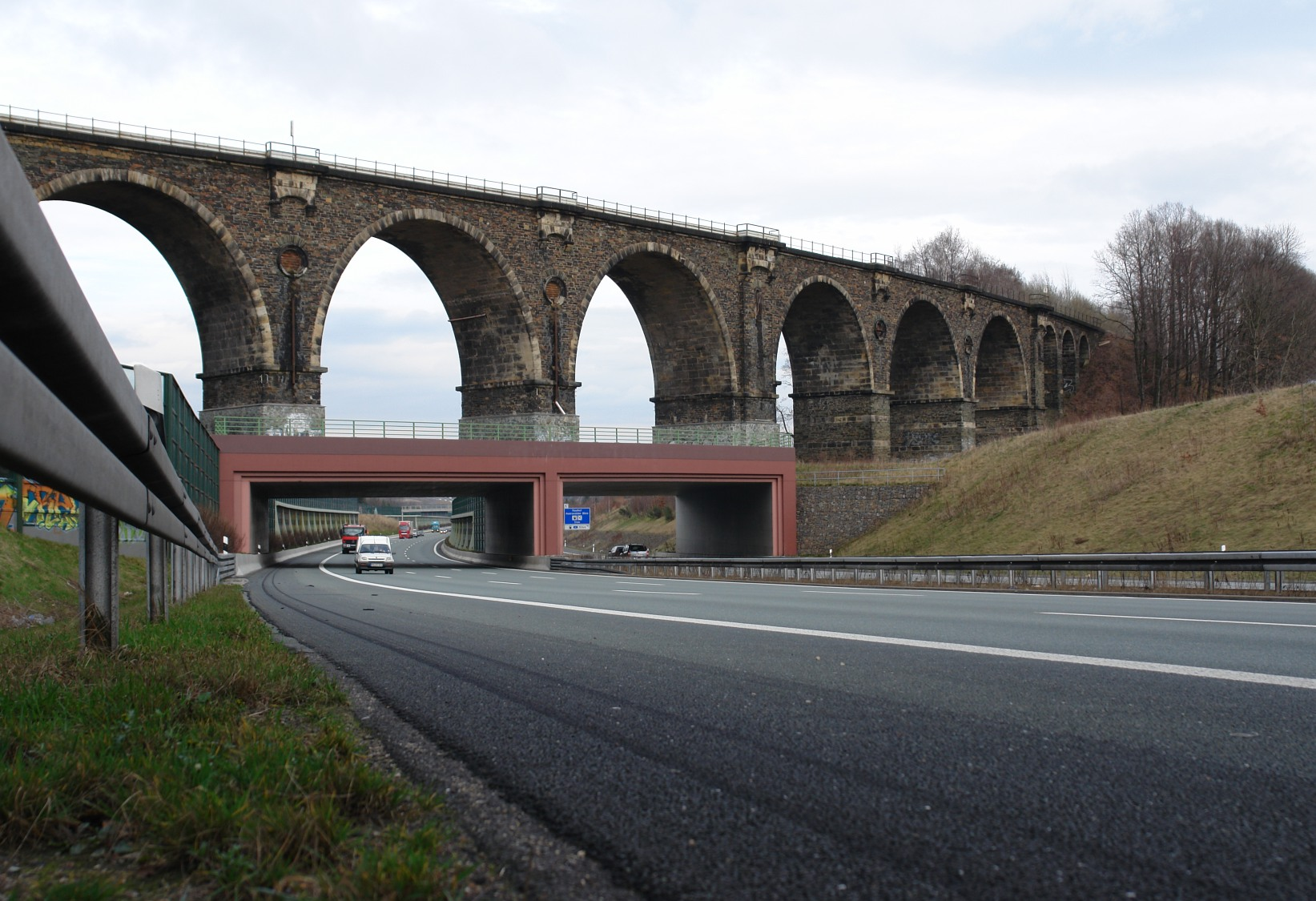
Bahrebachmühlen viaduct over the A4

- Bundesautobahn 4 (A4)
- Bundesautobahn 9 (A9)
- Bundesautobahn 13 (A13)
- Bundesautobahn 14 (A14)
- Bundesautobahn 17 (A17)
- Bundesautobahn 38 (A38)
- Bundesautobahn 72 (A72)

== Federal roads (Bundesstraßes) ==
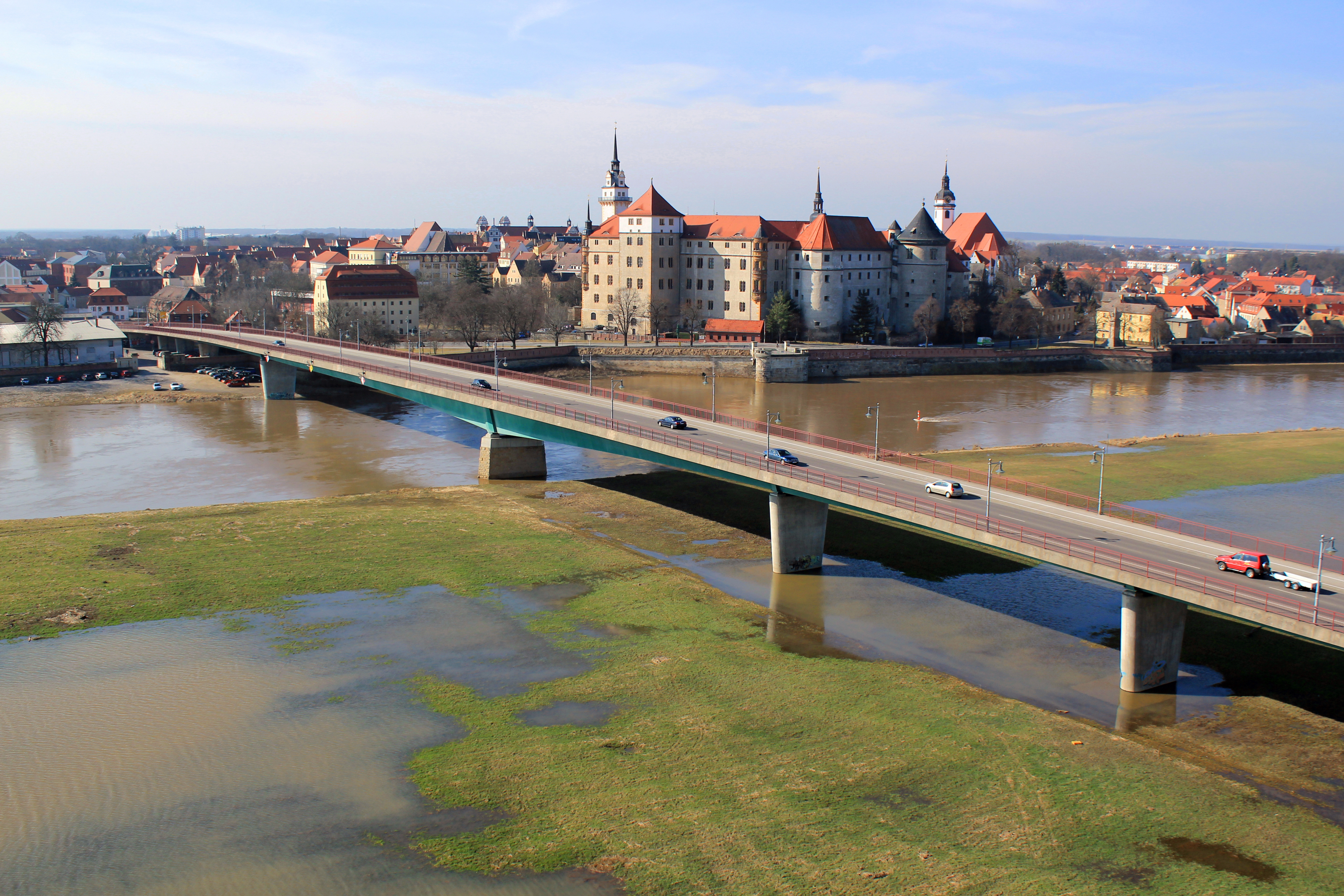
Bridge over the Elbe at Torgau (B87)

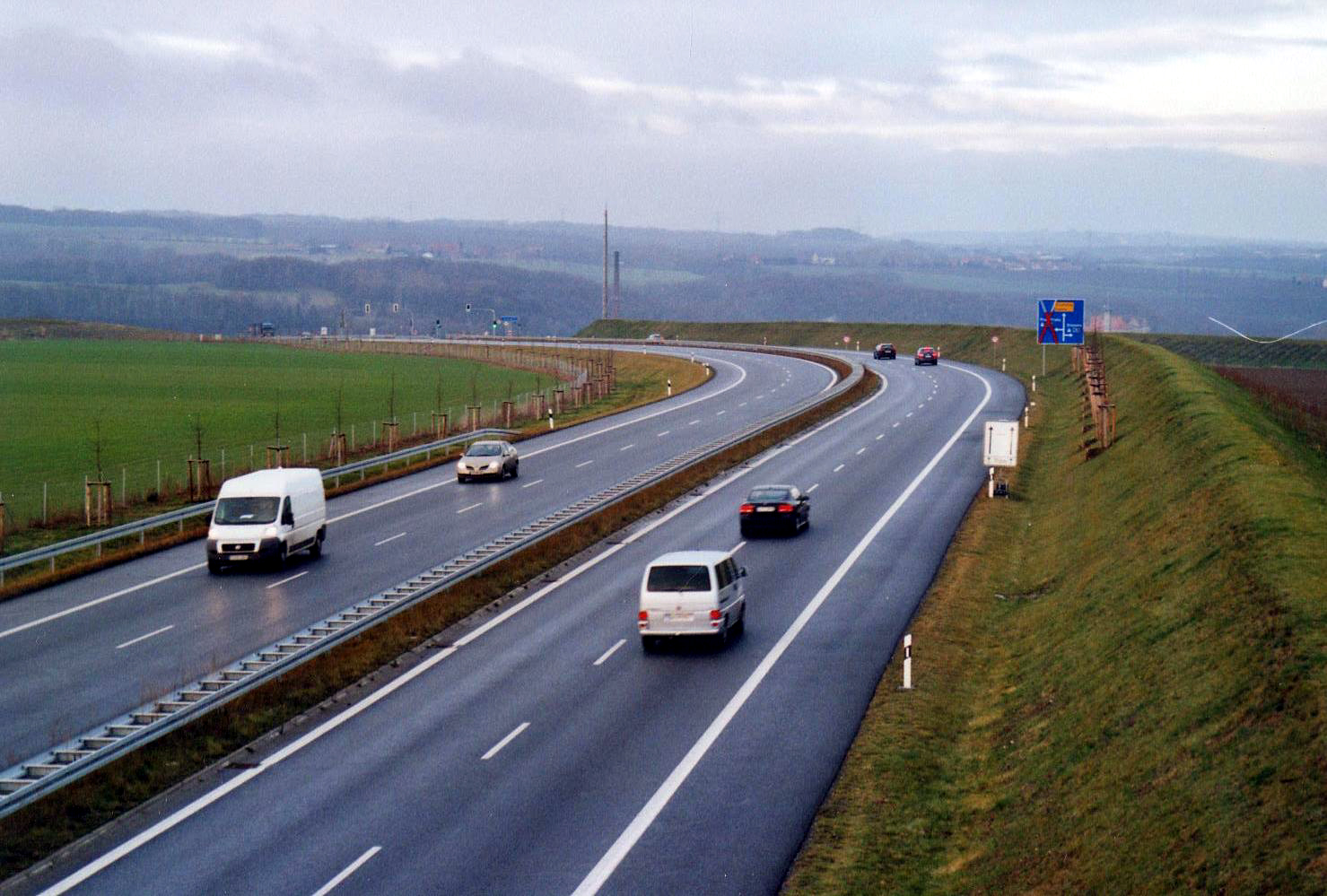
Autobahn link road at B172a near Pirna

- Bundesstraße 2
- Bundesstraße 6
- Bundesstraße 7
- Bundesstraße 87
- Bundesstraße 92
- Bundesstraße 93
- Bundesstraße 94
- Bundesstraße 95
- Bundesstraße 96
- Bundesstraße 97
- Bundesstraße 98
- Bundesstraße 99
- Bundesstraße 101
- Bundesstraße 107
- Bundesstraße 115
- Bundesstraße 156
- Bundesstraße 169
- Bundesstraße 170
- Bundesstraße 171
- Bundesstraße 172
- Bundesstraße 172a
- Bundesstraße 172b (in planning)
- Bundesstraße 173
- Bundesstraße 174
- Bundesstraße 175
- Bundesstraße 176
- Bundesstraße 177
- Bundesstraße 178
- Bundesstraße 180
- Bundesstraße 181
- Bundesstraße 182
- Bundesstraße 183
- Bundesstraße 183a
- Bundesstraße 184
- Bundesstraße 186
- Bundesstraße 282
- Bundesstraße 283

== Ancient and Historical Roads ==
- Bishop's Road (Meißen–Stolpen)
- Dresden to Teplitz Post Road
- Kulmer Steig
- Old Freiberg to Teplitz Post Road
- Salt roads (Alte Salzstraße and Böhmische Steige)
- Via Imperii
- Via Regia
- Via Regia Lusatiae Superioris (German:Hohe Straße)
- Way of St. James

== Scenic routes ==
- Deutsche Alleenstraße
- Sächsische Weinstraße
- Silver Road (German:Silberstraße)
- Fürstenstraße der Wettiner (under construction)
