= Bundesstraße 9 =

Federal highway in Germany

B 9
- Bundesstraße 9

Route information
- Length: 450 km (280 mi)

Major junctions
- North end: Kranenburg
- South end: Scheibenhardt

Location
- Country: Germany
- States: North Rhine-Westphalia, Rhineland-Palatinate

Highway system
- Roads in Germany; Autobahns; List; Federal; List; State; E-roads

The Bundesstraße 9 (abbr. B9) is a German federal highway. It follows the left side of the Rhine from the Dutch border at Kranenburg upstream to the French border near the city of Lauterbourg, where it connects to the French A35 autoroute. The origins of the road can be traced back to Ancient Rome.

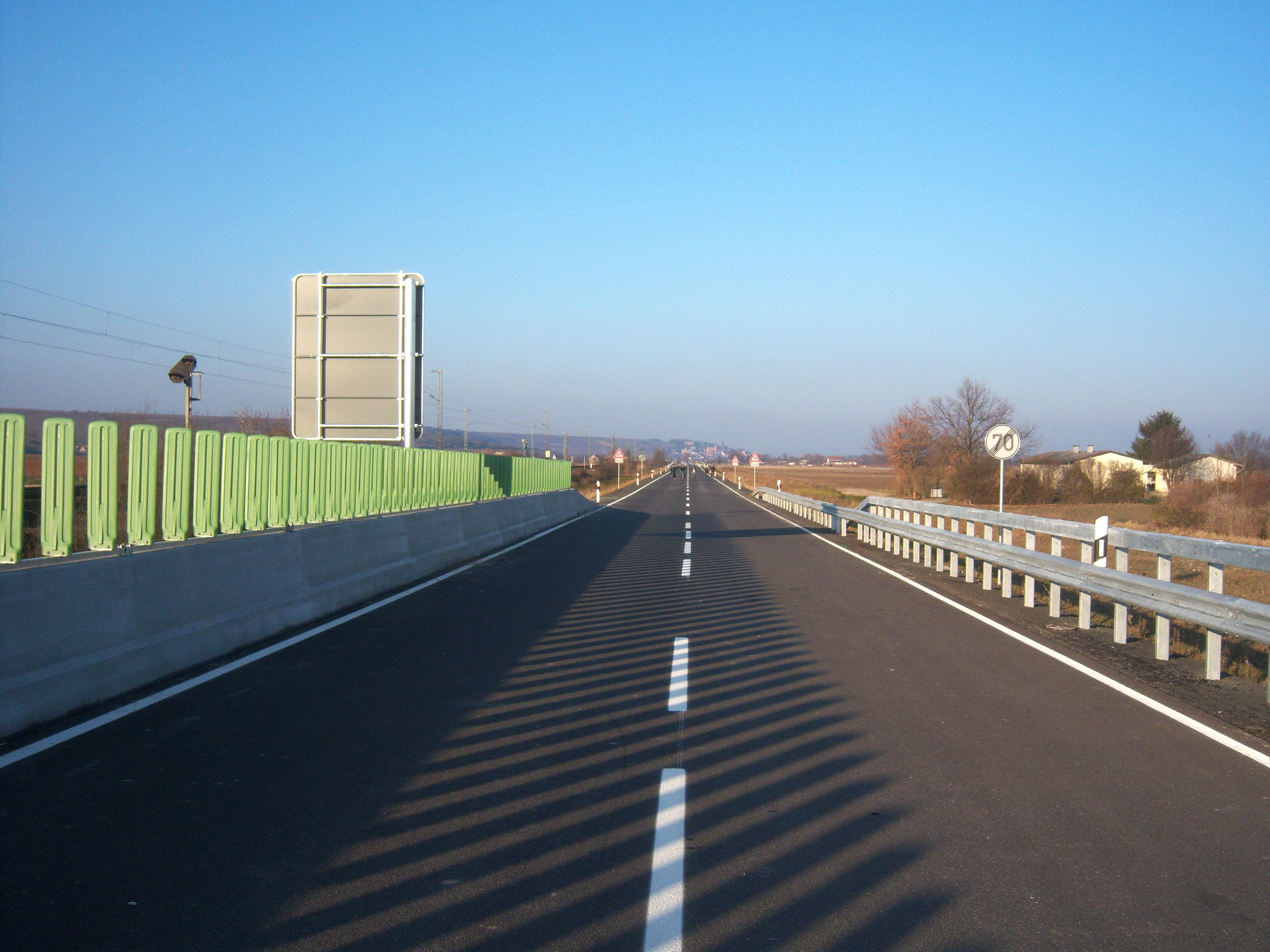
Bundesstraße 9 in Rheinhessen near Guntersblum

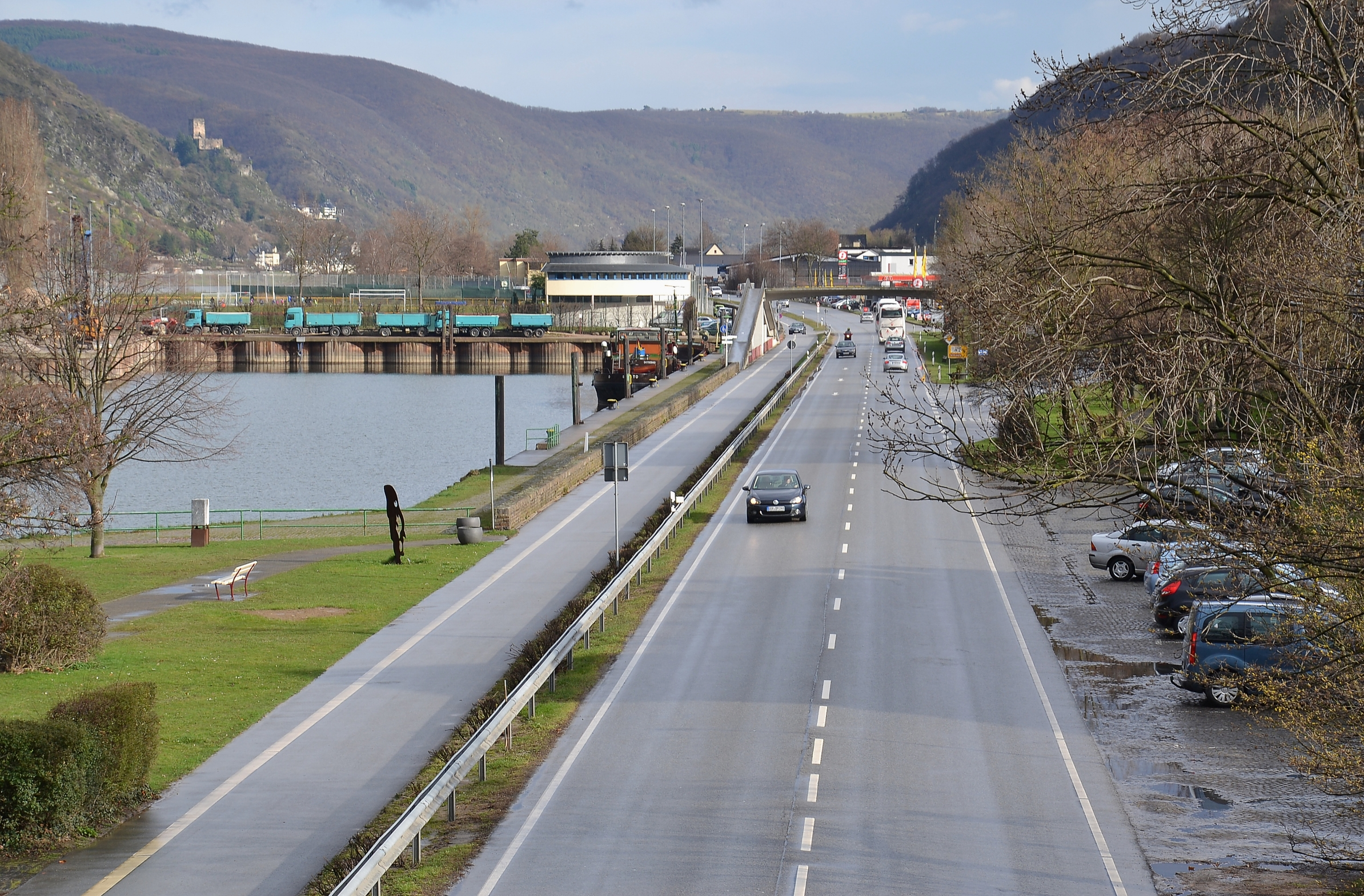
Bundesstraße 9 in Oberwesel

Some parts of the road have since been downgraded. The strip from Osterath to Neuss has been downgraded due to the Bundesautobahn 57 running in parallel. Between Cologne and Bonn the Bundesautobahn 555 replaced the Bundesstraße 9. From Bingen to Mainz the road has been replaced by the Bundesautobahn 60, and in the south the Bundesautobahn 65 replaced the Bundesstraße 9. However, some parts of the Bundesstraße 9 have been built to autobahn standards as well, most notably the part between Sinzig and Koblenz as well as the part between Frankenthal and Wörth am Rhein.

The part between Mainz and Worms is closed to transit truck traffic. Previously, this road had been commonly used by drivers who wanted to avoid the tolls on the autobahns. These drivers are now forced to take the Bundesautobahn 63 and Bundesautobahn 61.

== Junction lists ==
Legend:

- I/C - Interchange, I/S - Intersection, RSA - Rest and service area, OBR - Overhead bridge restaurant, R/R - Restaurant and rest plaza, L/B - Layby, V/P - Vista point, TN - tunnel, T/P - Toll plaza, BR - Bridge

km	Exit	Name	Destinations	Notes
	(F)	Bienwald border crossing		
	(23)	Kandel-Süd	A 65	
	(24)	Wörth-Dorschberg	A 65	
		Wörther Kreuz	B 10 A 65	
		Wörth-Mitte		
		Wörth-Daimler-Chrysler Tor 1		
		Jockgrim		
		Rheinzabern-Wiesenweg (Behelfsanschluss)		
		Rheinzabern		
		Rülzheim-Süd		
		Rülzheim-Nord		
		Bellheim		
		Westheim		
		Germersheim-Süd		
		Germersheim-Mitte		
		Germersheim-Nord	B 35	
		Lingenfeld		
		Schwegenheim	B 272	
		Speyer	B 39	
	(63)	Speyer	A 61	
	(5)	Dreieck Ludwigshafen	A 65	
		Frankenthal (Pfalz)		
	(23)	Ludwigshafen-Nord	A 6	
		Worms	B 47	
		Oppenheim		
		Nierstein	B 420	
	(24)	Mainz-Laubenheim	A 60	
	(13)	Bingen-Ost	A 60	
		Bingen am Rhein		
		Bacharach		
		Oberwesel		
		Sankt Goar		
		Boppard		
		Spay		
		Rhens		
		Koblenz	B 49 B 327	
	BR	Europa Bridge		Length: 400 m
		Koblenz	B 416	
	(10)	Koblenz-Nord	A 48	
		Mülheim-Kärlich		
		Weißenthurm	B 256	
		Andernach		
		Brohl-Lützing	B 412	
		Sinzig	B 266	
		Remagen		
		Bonn-Bad Godesberg		
		Bonn	B 56	
		Köln	B 51 B 55 B 59 B 265	
		Dormagen		
	(22)	Neuss-Uedesheim	A 46	
	(23)	Neuss-Norf	A 57	
	(14)	Büderich	A 52	
		Meerbusch	B 222	
	(26)	Osterath	A 44	
		Krefeld	B 509 B 57	
	(6)	Kerken	A 40	
		Kerken	B 510	
		Geldern	B 58	
		Kevelaer		
	(3)	Goch	A 57	
	(2)	Kleve	A 57	
		Kleve	B 57 B 220	
		Kranenburg	B 504	
	(NL)	Wyler border crossing		
