= Bundesautobahn 683 =

Federal motorway in Hesse, Germany

A 683
- Bundesautobahn 683
- Downgraded to B 45

Route information
- Length: 22 km (14 mi)

Location
- Country: Germany
- States: Hesse

Highway system
- Roads in Germany; Autobahns; List; Federal; List; State; E-roads

Bundesautobahn 683 (translates from German as Federal Motorway 683, short form Autobahn 683, abbreviated as BAB 683 or A 683) was a motorway in Germany, in the state of Hesse.

It was constructed from 1974 to 1979 and led south from the Hanau exit of the A 3. It went through Rodgau and ended at Dieburg, where the Autobahn connected to the A 680 leading westward to Darmstadt.

The Autobahn was downgraded to a Bundesstraße (Bundesstraße 45) in the 80s. Only the signs were changed though - the road, equipped with parking fields and hard shoulders, remained the same. In the 90s the road was continued northward, which turned the Hanau exit into a true interchange and removed the roundabout that used to be there. The continuation to the north, leading through the city of Hanau, is now called the Bundesstraße 43a.
