= B46 =

B46 may refer to:

- Bundesstraße 46, a German road
- B46 (New York City bus), a bus line in Brooklyn
- B46 nuclear bomb
- HLA-B46, a HLA-B serotype
- B46, the Taimanov variation of the Sicilian Defence chess opening
- Convair XB-46, an American aircraft
