= European route E441 =

Road in trans-European E-road network

E441

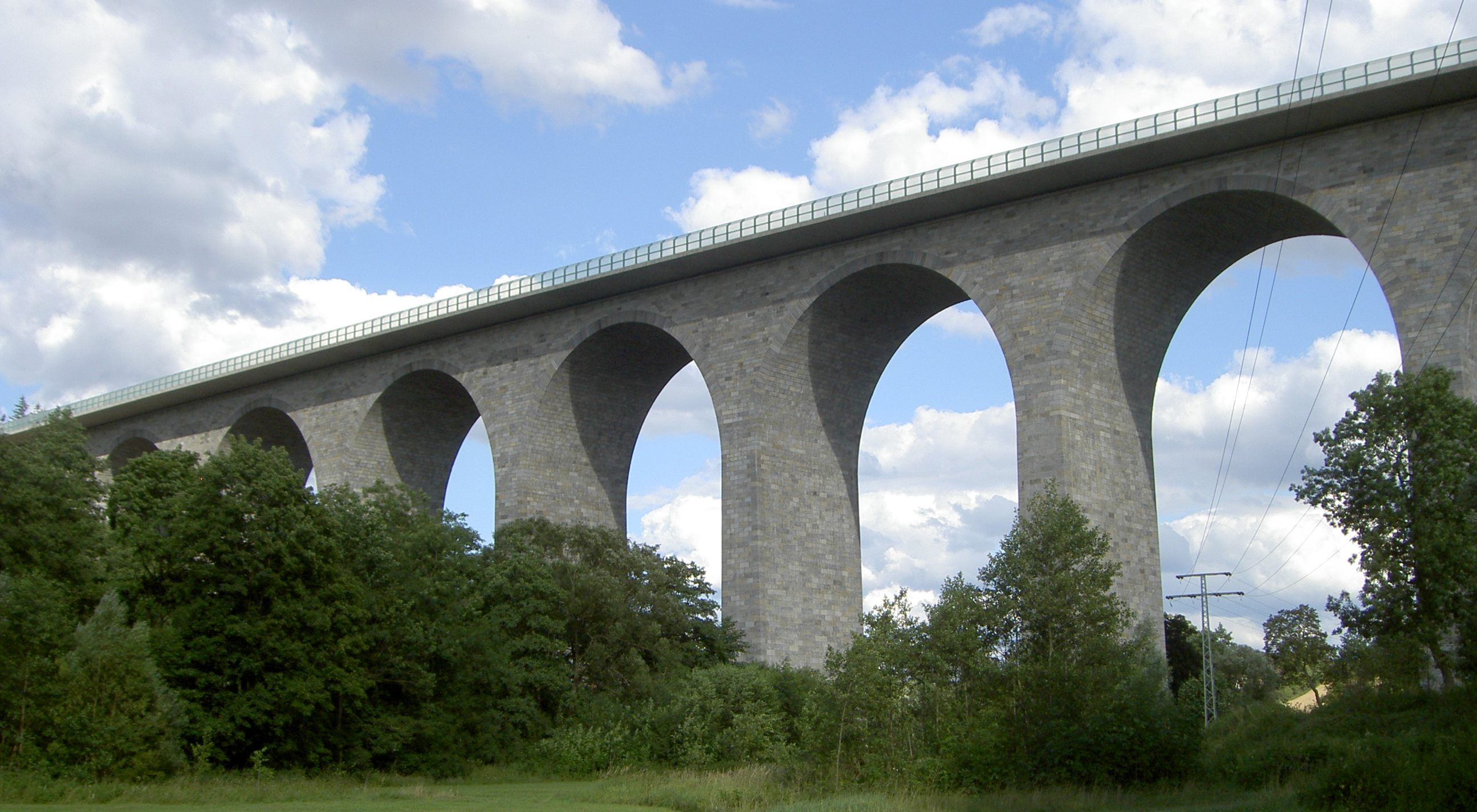
- E441 uses Elster Viaduct (Pirk) over the White Elster

Route information
- Length: 106 km (66 mi)

Major junctions
- From: Chemnitz
- Plauen
- To: Hof

Location
- Countries: Germany

Highway system
- International E-road network; A Class; B Class

European route E 441 is part of the international E-road network.

== Route ==
- Germany
  - E40 Chemnitz
  - E49 Plauen
  - E51 Hof
