= Bundesstraße 169 =

Federal highway in Germany

B 169
- Bundesstraße 169

Route information
- Length: 257 km (160 mi)

Major junctions
- From: Neuensalz
- To: Cottbus

Location
- Country: Germany
- States: Saxony, Brandenburg

Highway system
- Roads in Germany; Autobahns; List; Federal; List; State; E-roads

The Bundesstraße 169 (abbreviation: B 169) is a German federal highway in Brandenburg and in Saxony.

== Route ==
- Saxony:
  - Neuensalz (0.0 km) » B 173
  - Falkenstein (15.0 km)
  - Auerbach (21.2 km)
  - Rodewisch (23.9 km) » B 94
  - Stützengrün (32.8, km)
  - Schneeberg (46.2 km) » B 93
  - Aue (53.0 km) » B 101
  - Lößnitz (59.4 km)
  - Stollberg (69.4 km) » B 180
  - Chemnitz (Südring) (83.0 km) » B 173
  - Chemnitz (88.0 km) » B 95
  - Frankenberg (100.9 km) » B 180
  - Hainichen (110.2 km)
  - Döbeln (128.0 km) » B 175
  - Autobahnauffahrt Döbeln-Nord (132.0 km) » A 14
  - Ostrau (Sachsen) (137.8 km)
  - Riesa-Seerhausen (150.6 km) » B 6
  - Riesa (157.7 km) » B 182
  - Elbebrücke
  - Zeithain (162.6 km) » B 98
  - Gröditz (157.9 km)
- Brandenburg:
  - Prösen (180.0 km) » B 101
  - Elsterwerda (186.4 km) » B 101
  - Lauchhammer (201.5 km)
  - Schwarzheide (209.0 km)
  - Autobahnauffahrt Ruhland (211.0 km) » A 13
  - Schwarzheide (211.5 km)
  - Senftenberg (223.5 km) » B 96
  - Allmosen (231.2 km) » B 96 » B 156
  - Drebkau (244.5 km)
  - Cottbus (257.3 km) » B 97

== History ==
=== Origin ===
The stretch of road between Chemnitz and Stollberg was upgraded to a chaussee in 1823.

=== Earlier descriptions ===
The Reichsstraße 169 between Cottbus and Neuensalz was inaugurated in 1937. During the East German years, the road was known as the Fernverkehrsstraße 169 (long-distance route 169) (abbreviation: F 169). Building plan documents show that construction work was carried out in the early 1970s.

On September 22, 2008, after almost five years of construction, the Senftenberg bypass was opened to traffic. The Drebkau bypass was approved on December 14, 2009.

== Expansion ==
=== Saxony ===
The second section of the B 169 in the Riesa/Döbeln area is currently being expanded. From the B 6 junction in Seerhausen to the completed four-lane section in Riesa, it was expanded as the B 169n and opened to traffic on September 24, 2012. The European Regional Development Fund contributed €20 million to the costs.

According to the Saxon state government, further expansion is to be carried out up to the A 14 Döbeln Nord junction. The project specifically aims to create an efficient road connection between the city of Riesa and the federal highway 14 north of Döbeln. In this area, it might reduce traffic congestion in the towns of Salbitz and Seerhausen. The implementation will eliminate the noise pollution and emissions pollution for residents and reduce the travel time by no longer having to drive through town. The expansion between Seerhausen and Döbeln still requires several approval processes and decisions from the neighboring communities about the route variants of the B 169.

Since 2013, the “Göltzschtalumgehung” has been rerouted the B 169 between Rodewisch and Siebenhitz. The work was originally scheduled to be completed in 2018, but the opening was postponed to 2021 due to contaminated sites being discovered.

=== Brandenburg ===
The partial three-lane expansion of the B 169 between the Ruhland and Plessa motorway junctions into a motorway was planned. According to the original plan, the 14.5 kilometer long new construction with several bridges was supposed to begin in two sections from 2017 to 2018, but was delayed indefinitely (as of November 2020). The B 169 between Cottbus and the Elbe-Elster district represents a nationally important east-west route and has a high proportion of traffic inland.

The spatial planning procedure for the OU Elsterwerda in the area of the B 169 was opened on January 4, 2010.

The estimated construction costs currently amount to €32.5 million.

=== Additional ===
The B 169 runs as a route through the entire Lower Lusatia. Of the 257 kilometers total length, around 30 kilometers have four lanes. Some of the federal highway 169 runs on the same route as other federal highways, such as the B 96.

The Erzgebirge folk rock singer and songwriter Stefan Gerlach dedicated the song “De 169” (released in 1994) to the road that runs through his hometown Stützengrün.

== See also ==
- List of roads in Saxony
- List of federal roads in Germany
