= D6 motorway (Czech Republic) =

Czech motorway

D6 Motorway
- Dálnice D6

Route information
- Part of E48 E49
- Length: 111.5 km (69.3 mi) Planned: 159.7 km (99.2 mi)

Major junctions
- From: D0 in Prague
- To: B303 border with Germany

Location
- Country: Czech Republic
- Regions: Prague, Central Bohemian, Ústí nad Labem, Karlovy Vary
- Major cities: Prague, Karlovy Vary, Cheb

Highway system
- Highways in the Czech Republic
← D5	→ D7

D6 motorway (Czech: Dálnice D6) is a motorway in the Czech Republic. Once completed, it will connect Prague to Karlovy Vary, Cheb, and the border with Bavaria in Germany where it continues as Bundesstraße 303 across Bundesautobahn 93 towards Bundesautobahn 70. About 111.5 km (69.3 mi) of the motorway is in operation.

The D6 motorway is part of the European road E48, and a short part of it forms the European road E49. If Bundesautobahn 70 is extended to the Czech border, it will form the second continuous motorway link between the Czech Republic and Bavaria.

== Chronology ==
The motorway was formerly planned and partially built as Expressway R6 (Czech: Rychlostní silnice R6) before being changed to Motorway D6.

The section between Pavlov – Velká Dobrá was built in two stages, at a total length of the section being 5.7 kilometres (3.5 mi). The motorway route is built in the R 24,5/100 category. Construction of the section started in May 1999. The first stage of the section was put into operation in half profile on 20 June 2001. The second profile was put into operation on 1 June 2002. The second stage was put into operation in half profile in autumn 2000 and in full profile on 20 June 2001.

The D6 begins at a connection with the Prague ring road which starts at the Řepy interchange and ends in the cadastre of the village of Pavlov where it connects to the previously built section Pavlov - Velká Dobrá, making the Prague - Pavlov section 10.4 kilometres (6.5 mi) long. The motorway in this section is built in category R 24,5/120. The route of the motorway is to be crossed in the future by a new runway of Ruzyně Airport. Therefore, a tunnel was built in advance during the construction, to minimize the impact of the later construction, on traffic. Construction of the section started in March 2005 and was handed over for use in December 2008.

At a cost of CZK 1 billion, construction on the Lubenec bypass started in March 2018, and finished in March 2021. The construction was led by a consortium of Svietelsky and Strabag.

The 9.2 kilometres (5.7 mi) relocation of the D6 in Hořesedly is set to open in June 2025 Two months later, in September 2025, is the planned opening of the 5.2 kilometres (3.2 mi) long bypass of Hořovičky.. Instead, both sections were opened simultaneously in September 2025.

=== Relocations ===
There are several parts of the I/6, which had to be relocated, to accommodate bypasses around important towns. These relocations meant that the old I/6 road was redesignated as road I/606. The 6.45 kilometres (4.01 mi) relocation of the D6 in Krupá was put into operation in August 2024.

=== Future developments ===
Several tenders have been issued for future construction, in, and east of Karlovy Vary. In 2024, a tender has been issued for 8 kilometres (5.0 mi) long section between Bošov and Knínice, at a cost of nearly €170 million, and the section is now under construction.

== Exit list ==
Country	Region	Location	km	mi	Exit	Name	Destinations	Notes
Czech Republic	Prague	Prague	0	0.0	—	Řepy	D0 E48	Kilometrage starting point
Czech Republic	Central Bohemian Region	Central Bohemian Region	3	1.9	—	Hostivice		
Czech Republic	Central Bohemian Region	Central Bohemian Region	7	4.3	—	Jeneč		Start of electronic toll section
Czech Republic	Central Bohemian Region	Central Bohemian Region	12	7.5	—	Unhošť	I/61	
Czech Republic	Central Bohemian Region	Central Bohemian Region	16	9.9	—	Velká Dobrá		
Czech Republic	Central Bohemian Region	Central Bohemian Region			Rest area	Odpočívka Velká Dobrá		
Czech Republic	Central Bohemian Region	Central Bohemian Region	25	16	—	Tuchlovice		
Czech Republic	Central Bohemian Region	Central Bohemian Region			Rest area	Odpočívka Honice		Eastbound only
Czech Republic	Central Bohemian Region	Central Bohemian Region			Rest area	Odpočívka Nové Strašecí		Westbound only
Czech Republic	Central Bohemian Region	Central Bohemian Region	32	20	—	Nové Strašecí		
Czech Republic	Central Bohemian Region	Central Bohemian Region	38	24	—	Řevničov	I/16	End of electronic toll section
Czech Republic	Central Bohemian Region	Central Bohemian Region	43	27	—	Krupa		Temporary end of motorway
Czech Republic	Central Bohemian Region	Central Bohemian Region	51	32	—	Kněževes		
Czech Republic	Central Bohemian Region	Central Bohemian Region			Rest area	Odpočívka Kolesov		
Czech Republic	Central Bohemian Region	Central Bohemian Region	62	39	—	Jesenice	I/27	
Czech Republic	Usti nad Labem Region	Usti nad Labem Region	68	42	—	Černčice		
Czech Republic	Usti nad Labem Region	Usti nad Labem Region	77	48	—	Lubenec		Temporary start of motorway
Czech Republic	Usti nad Labem Region	Usti nad Labem Region	83	52	—	Bošov	I/6	Temporary end of motorway
Czech Republic	Karlovy Vary Region	Karlovy Vary Region	129	80	—	Dvory	I/6	Temporary start of motorway
Czech Republic	Karlovy Vary Region	Karlovy Vary Region	131	81	—	Jenišov	I/20 E49	Start of electronic toll section
Czech Republic	Karlovy Vary Region	Karlovy Vary Region	136	85	—	Nové Sedlo		
Czech Republic	Karlovy Vary Region	Karlovy Vary Region			Rest area	Odpočívka Staré Sedlo		
Czech Republic	Karlovy Vary Region	Karlovy Vary Region	142	88	—	Těšovice		
Czech Republic	Karlovy Vary Region	Karlovy Vary Region	143	89	—	Sokolov		
Czech Republic	Karlovy Vary Region	Karlovy Vary Region	146	91	—	Březová		
Czech Republic	Karlovy Vary Region	Karlovy Vary Region	149	93	—	Tisová		
Czech Republic	Karlovy Vary Region	Karlovy Vary Region	156	97	—	Kynšperk nad Ohří		
Czech Republic	Karlovy Vary Region	Karlovy Vary Region			Rest area	Odpočívka Odrava		Westbound only
Czech Republic	Karlovy Vary Region	Karlovy Vary Region	160	99	—	Odrava		End of electronic toll section
Czech Republic	Karlovy Vary Region	Karlovy Vary Region			Rest area	Odpočívka Obilna		Eastbound only
Czech Republic	Karlovy Vary Region	Karlovy Vary Region	162	101	—	Jesenice	I/21	
Czech Republic	Karlovy Vary Region	Karlovy Vary Region	164	102	—	Cheb-východ		
Czech Republic	Karlovy Vary Region	Karlovy Vary Region			Rest area	Odpočívka Jindřichov		Westbound only
Czech Republic	Karlovy Vary Region	Karlovy Vary Region	169	105	—	Cheb-západ	I/6 I/21 E48 E49	Temporary end, sections in planning Road continues as Czech I/6
1.000 mi = 1.609 km; 1.000 km = 0.621 mi: Unopened

== Images ==
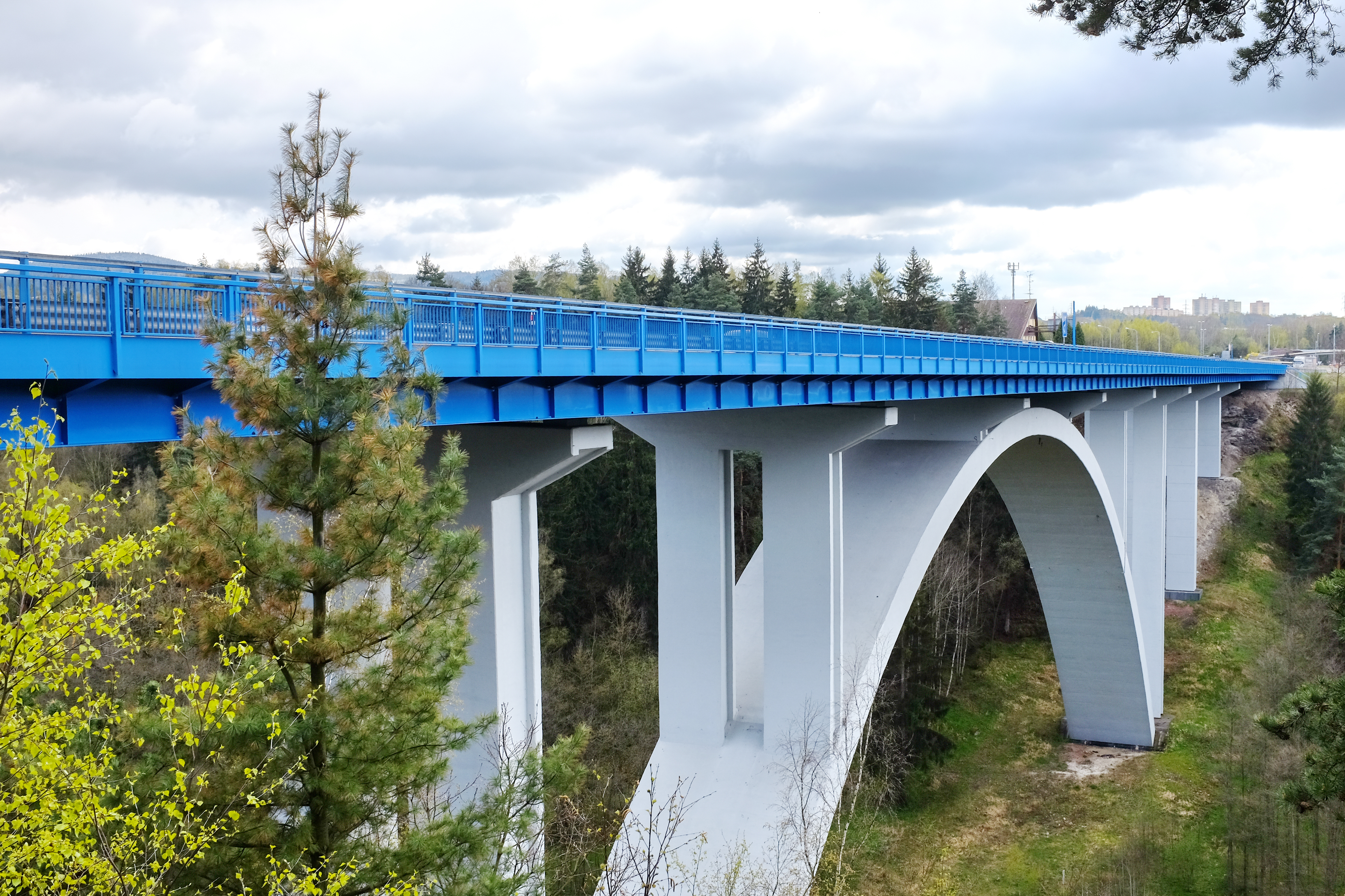
Bridge of the D6 motorway near the town of Sokolov, Sokolov District.

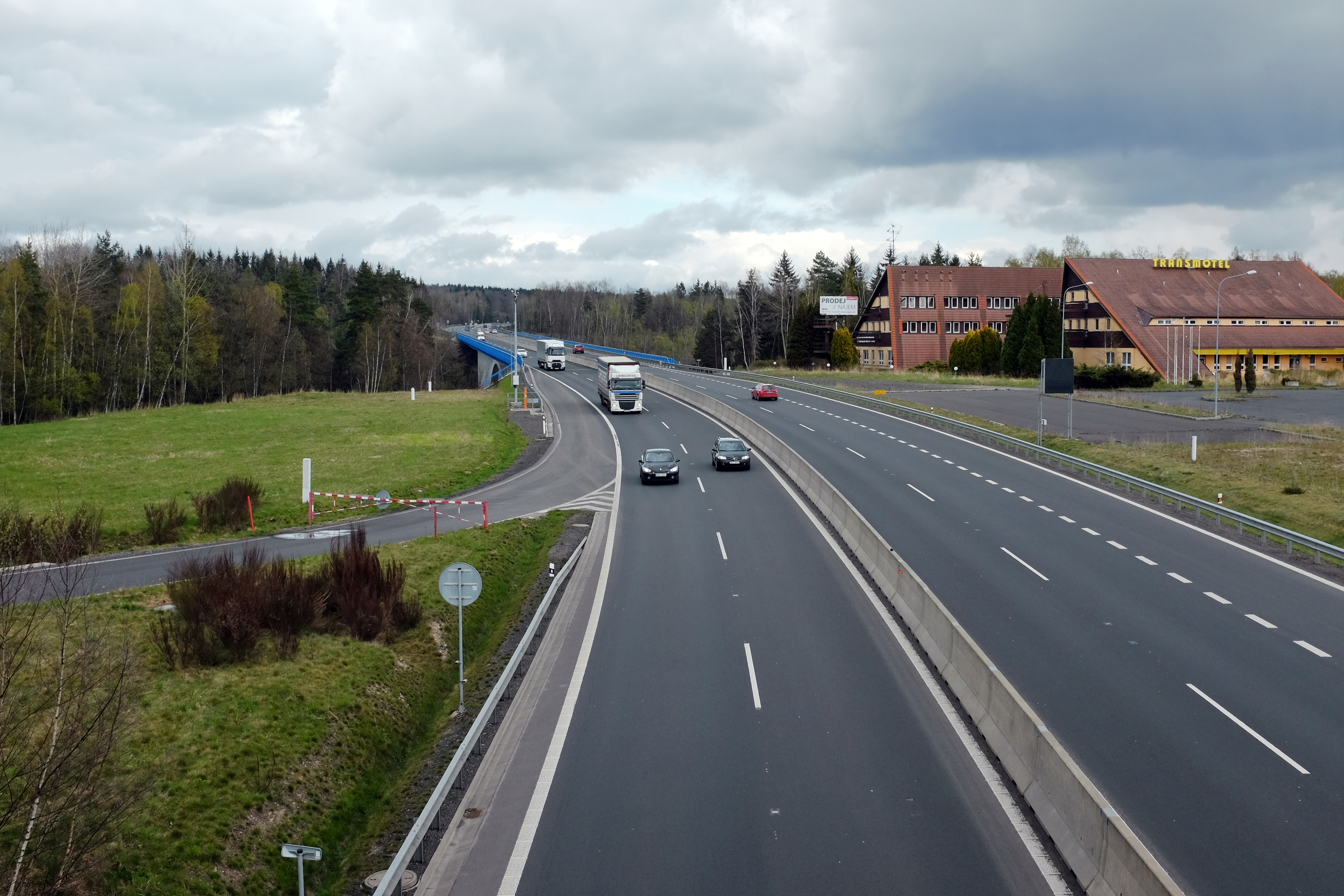

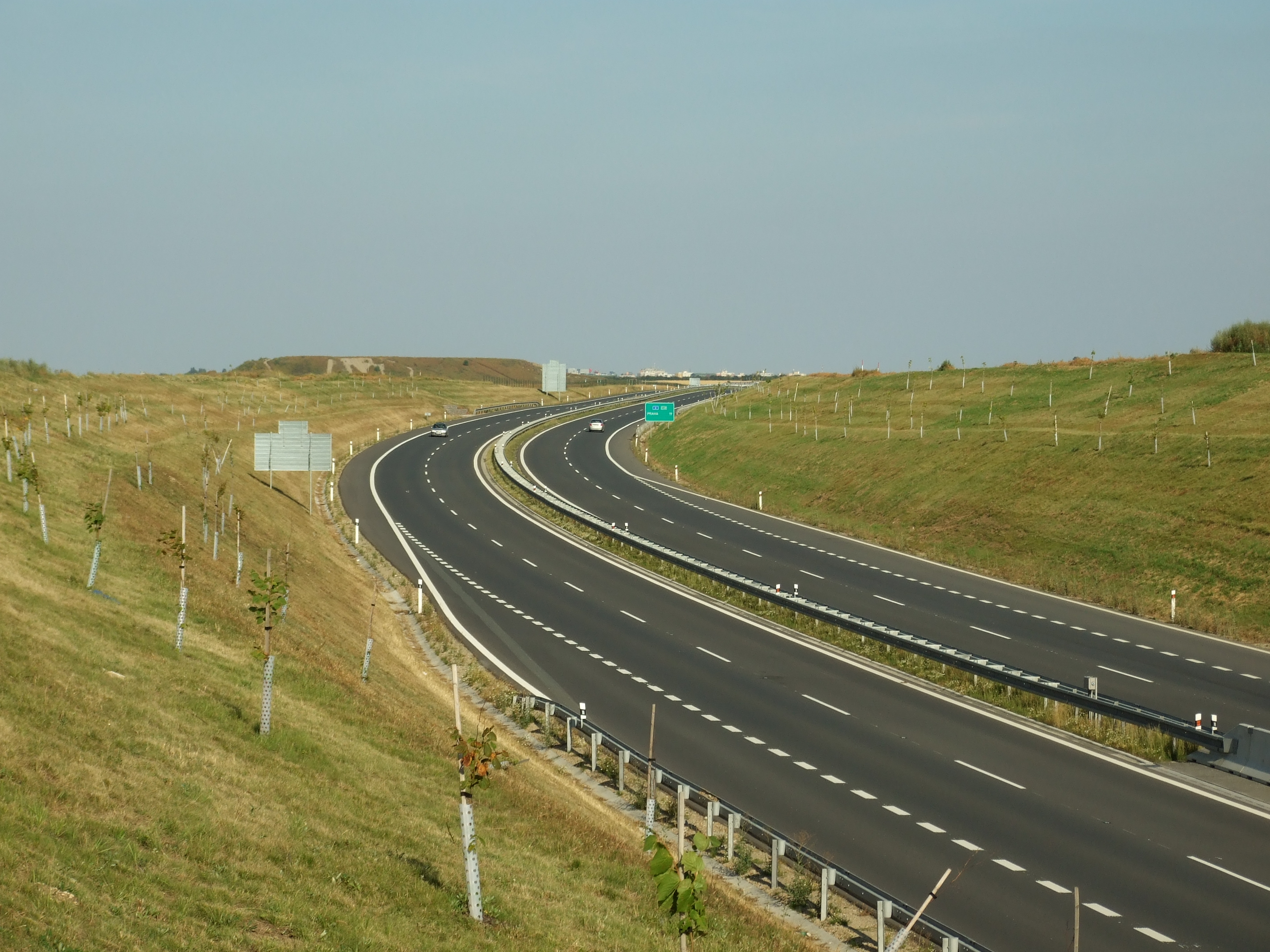
D6 motorway near Jeneč in Central Bohemian Region.

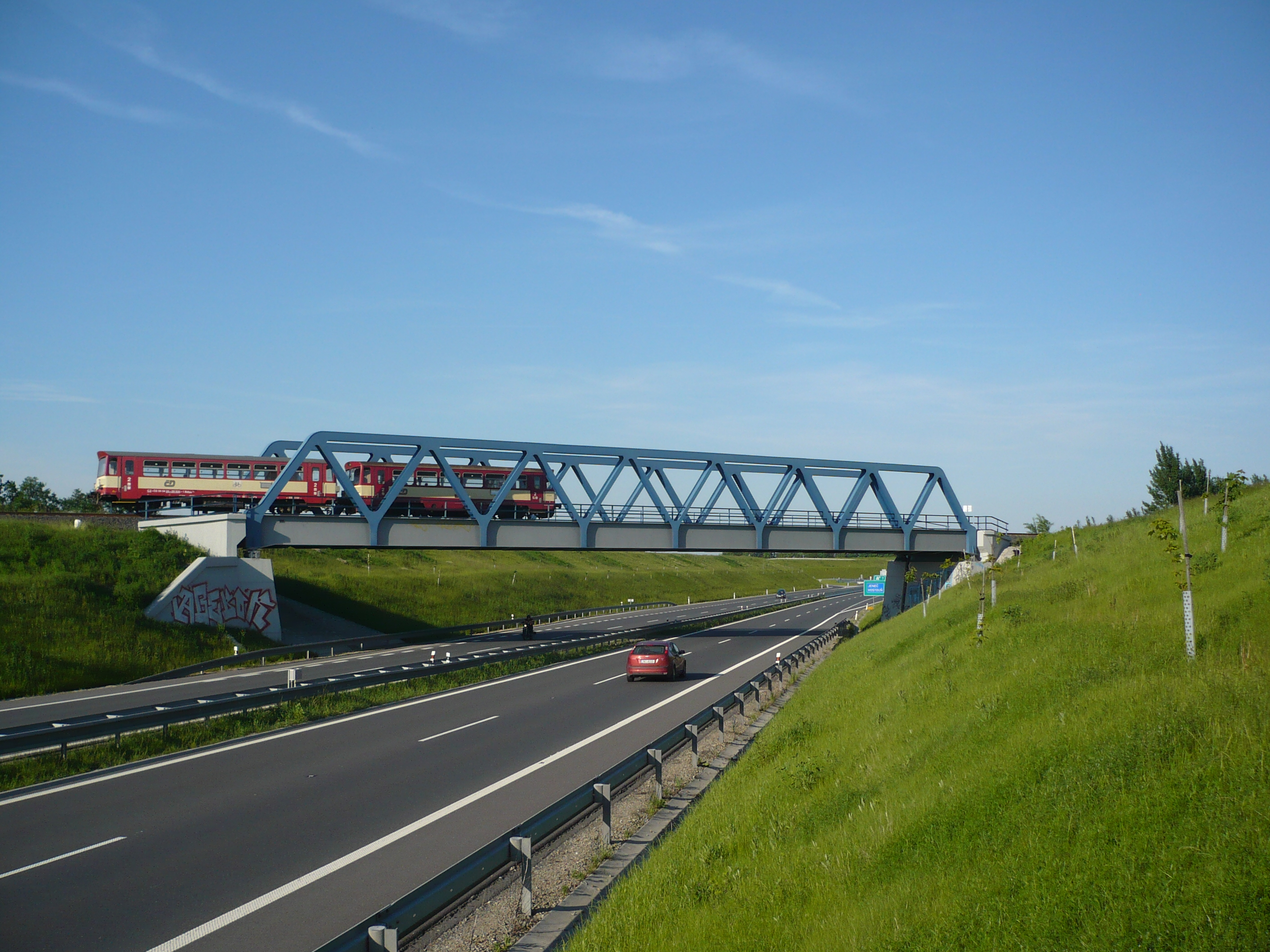
Railway bridge over D6 between Jeneč and Hostouň.
