= Hořesedly =

- Municipality
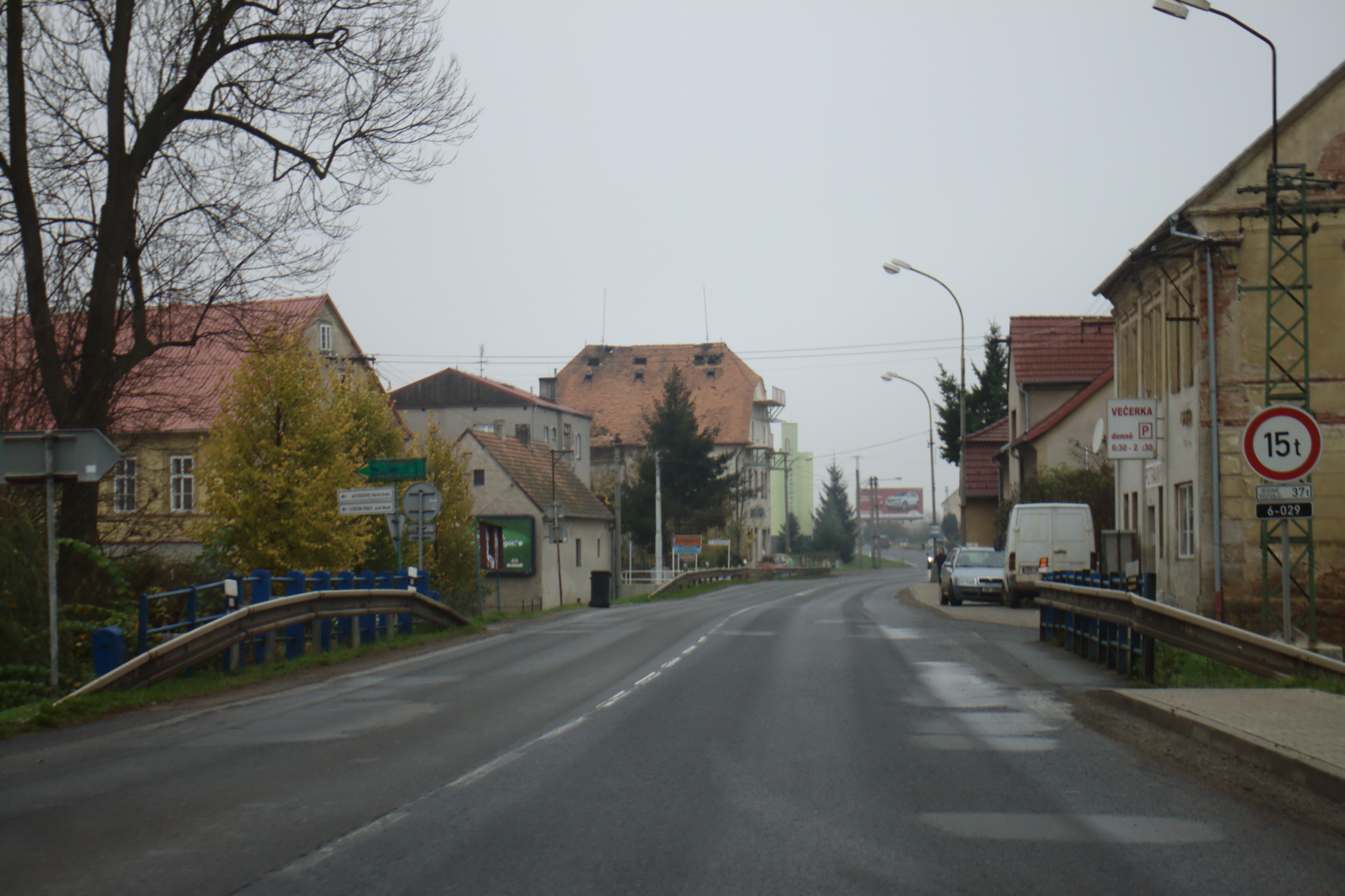
- Main street

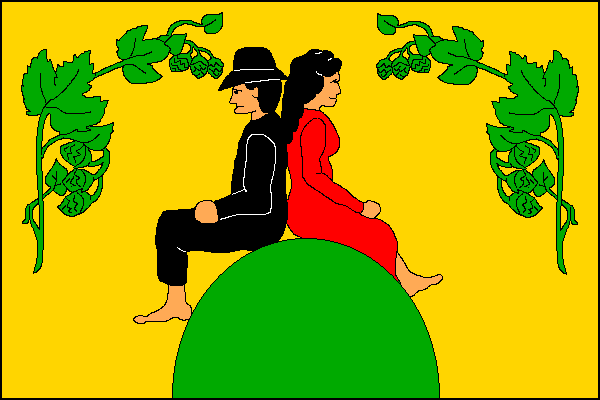
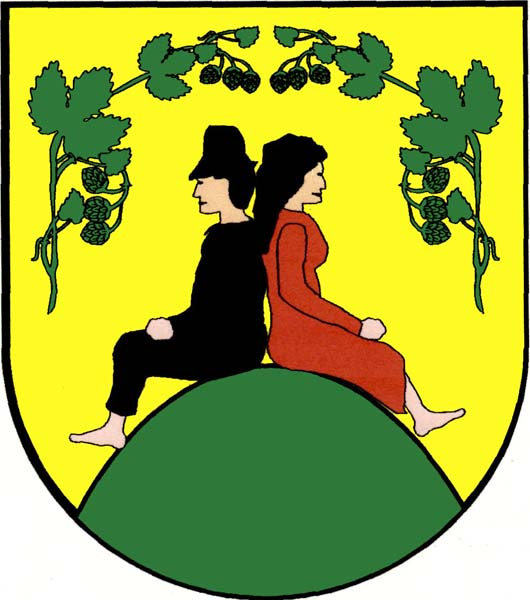
- Flag Coat of arms

- Location in the Czech Republic
- Coordinates: 50°9′45″N 13°36′10″E
- Country: Czech Republic
- Region: Central Bohemian
- District: Rakovník
- First mentioned: 1316

Area
  - Total: 5.84 km^{2} (2.25 sq mi)
- Elevation: 379 m (1,243 ft)

Population (2026-01-01)
  - Total: 428
  - Density: 73.3/km^{2} (190/sq mi)
- Time zone: UTC+1 (CET)
  - Summer (DST): UTC+2 (CEST)
- Postal code: 270 04
- Website: www.obec-horesedly.cz

Hořesedly (German: Horosedl) is a municipality and village in Rakovník District in the Central Bohemian Region of the Czech Republic. It has about 400 inhabitants.

== Etymology ==
The name consists of the words hoře ('above') and sedět ('to sit' in modern Czech, but in Old Czech meaning 'to settle down'). The meaning of the name is "the village of people who settled above".

== Geography ==
Hořesedly is located about 11 kilometres (7 mi) northwest of Rakovník and 53 km (33 mi) west of Prague. It lies in an agricultural landscape in the Rakovník Uplands. The highest point is the hill Cikán at 437 m (1,434 ft) above sea level.

== History ==
The first written mention of Hořesedly is from 1316. From 1355 to 1418, it was property of the church at Prague Castle. In 1420, Hořesedly was shortly owned by a branch of the Kolowrat family, but it was confiscated from them by the royal chamber and passed on to various lesser nobles.

== Demographics ==
Historical population

Year	Pop.	±%
1869	455	—
1880	530	+16.5%
1890	547	+3.2%
1900	655	+19.7%
1910	667	+1.8%

Year	Pop.	±%
1921	594	−10.9%
1930	776	+30.6%
1950	453	−41.6%
1961	492	+8.6%
1970	476	−3.3%

Year	Pop.	±%
1980	432	−9.2%
1991	409	−5.3%
2001	425	+3.9%
2011	433	+1.9%
2021	399	−7.9%

Source: Censuses

== Transport ==
The I/6 road (part of the European route E48) runs through the municipality. It replaces the unfinished section of the D6 motorway from Prague to Karlovy Vary.

== Sights ==
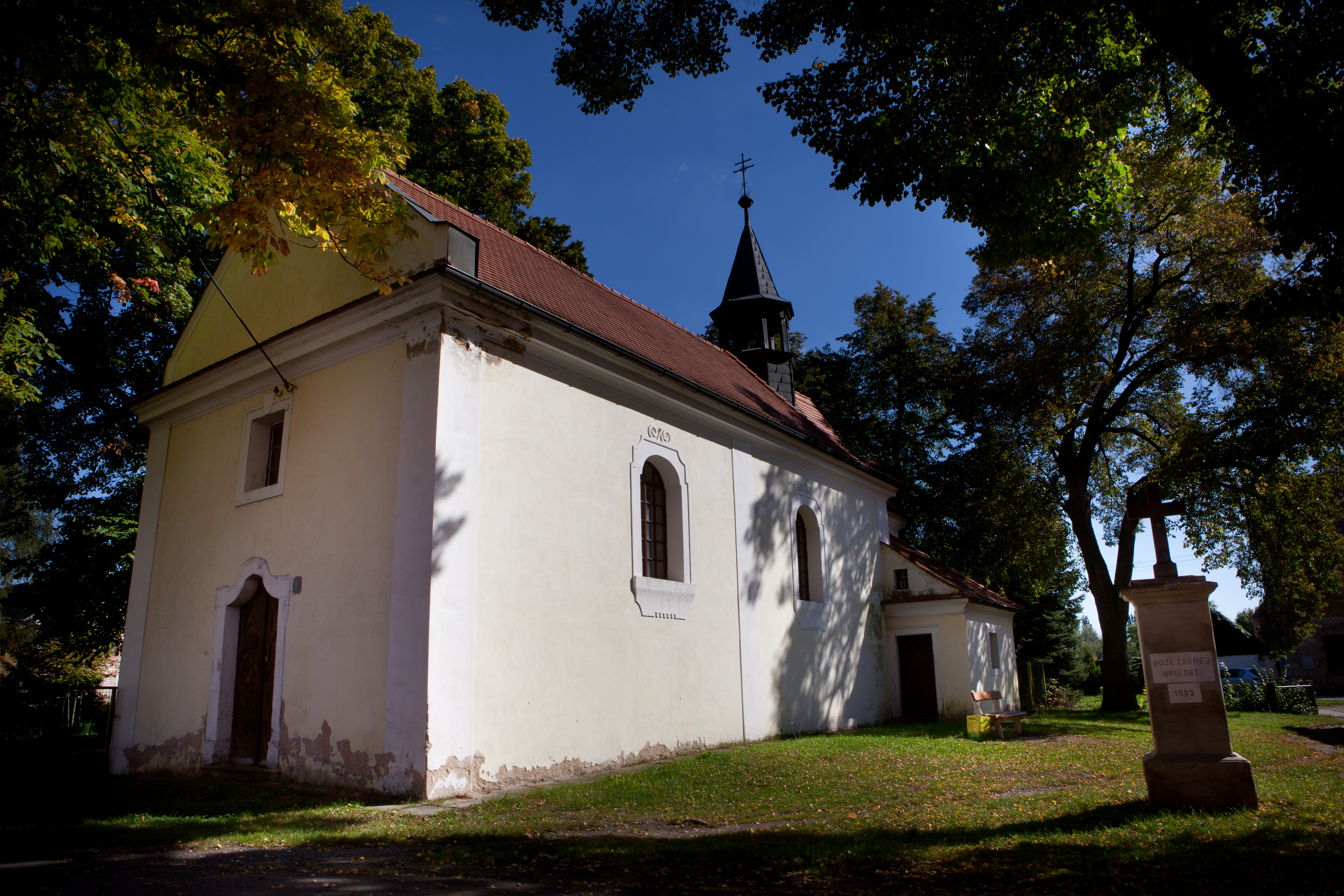
Church of Saint Lawrence

The main landmark of Hořesedly is the Church of Saint Lawrence. It is a small Baroque church from the early 18th century.
