= Bundesautobahn 65 =

Federal motorway in Germany

A 65
- Bundesautobahn 65
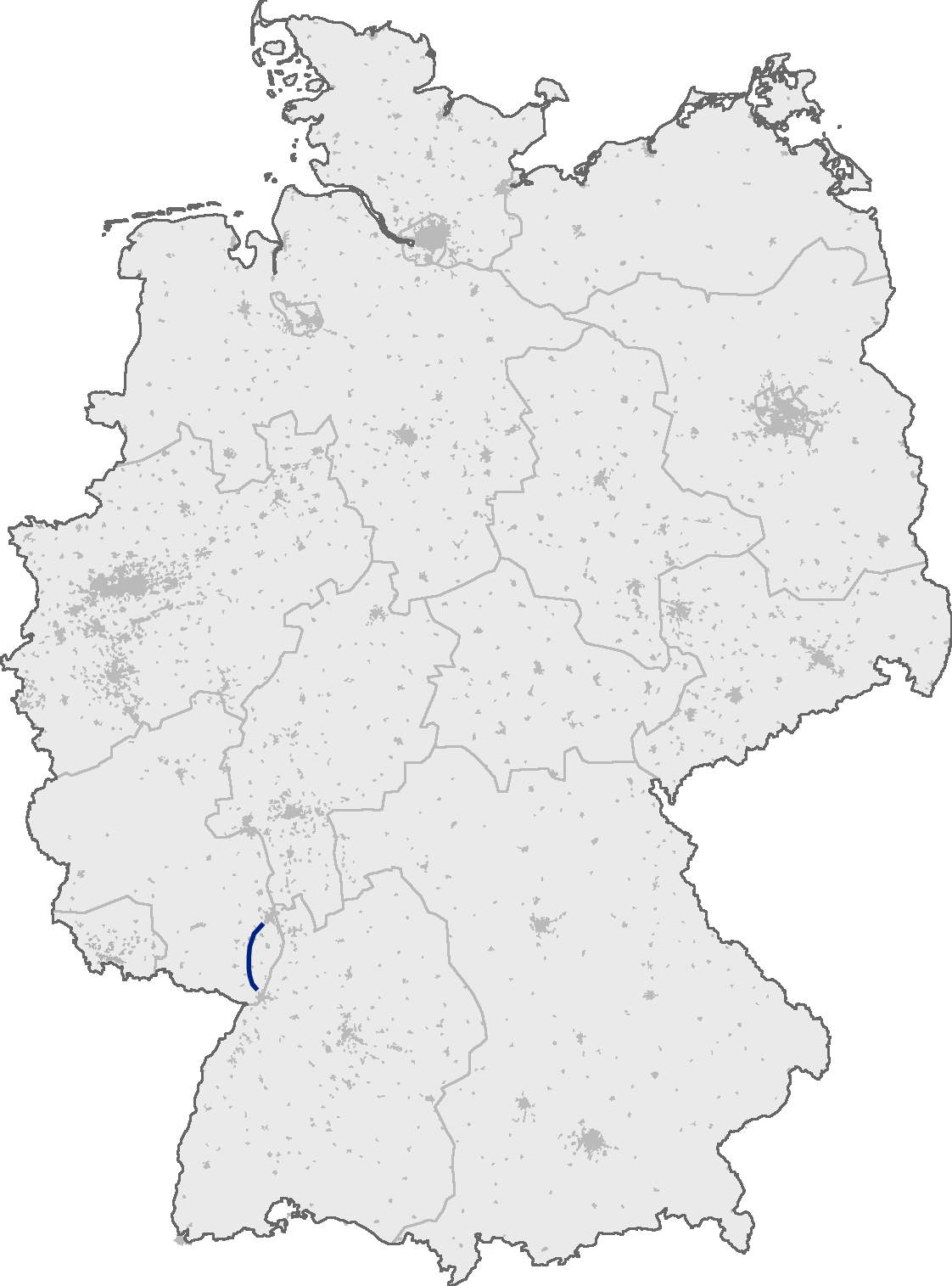

Route information
- Length: 60 km (37 mi)

Major junctions
- B 9

Location
- Country: Germany
- States: Rhineland-Palatinate

Highway system
- Roads in Germany; Autobahns; List; Federal; List; State; E-roads
← A 64	→ A 66

Bundesautobahn 65 (translates from German as Federal Motorway 65, short form Autobahn 65, abbreviated as BAB 65 or A 65) is an autobahn in southwestern Germany. The newest section, between Neustadt and Landau, was opened only in the early 1990s.

Plans to build a final stretch between Kandel or Wörth am Rhein and the French A35 autoroute towards Haguenau and Strasbourg were not implemented during the 1990s when the focus of Autobahn construction switched to the eastern side of the country: the project remains contentious because of the ecological impact it could have on the Bienwald (wooded area) through which the road would run.

== Exit list ==
Legend:

- I/C - Interchange, I/S - Intersection, RSA - Rest and service area, OBR - Overhead bridge restaurant, R/R - Restaurant and rest plaza, L/B - Layby, V/P - Vista point, TN - tunnel, T/P - Toll plaza, BR - Bridge
- C - Cloverleaf, S - Stack, T-A - Trumpet-A, T-B - Trumpet-B, DT - Directional-T/Y, SDT - Semi-Directional-T/Y, P-Y - Partial-Y, D - Diamond, P-C - Partial cloverleaf, D-D - Diverging diamond, D-R - Direct ramp

km	Exit	Name	Destinations	Notes
	(5)	Ludwigshafen-Süd 3-way interchange B 9		
	(5)	Ludwigshafen -- Oggersheimer Straße		
	(6)	Mutterstadt		
	(7)	Mutterstadt 4-way interchange A 61		
	(8)	Dannstadt-Schauernheim		
	(9)	Hochdorf-Assenheim		
		Spielberg / Spechtersee parking area		
	(10)	Haßloch		
	(11)	Deidesheim		
		Bridge 60 m		
	(12)	Neustadt an der Weinstraße-Nord		
	(13)	Neustadt an der Weinstraße-Süd		
	(14)	Edenkoben		
		Services Pfälzer Weinstraße		
	(15)	Landau-Nord		
		Tunnel 100 m		
	(16)	Landau-Zentrum		
	(17)	Landau-Süd		
	(18)	Insheim		
	(19)	Rohrbach		
	(20)	Kandel-Nord		
	(21)	Kandel-Mitte		
	(22)	Kandel-Süd (A 652) 3-way interchange B 9		
	(23)	Wörth-Dorschberg		
	(24)	Wörth 4-way interchange B 9 B 10		
		Hagenbach-Nord (planned)		
		Hagenbach-Süd (planned)		
		Kreuz Berg-Neulauterburg (planned) B 9		
	(28)	Bienwald border crossing {Planned)		
France–Germany border Through to A 35
