= B87 =

B87 may refer to:

- Sicilian Defence, Scheveningen Variation, Encyclopaedia of Chess Openings code
- Myiasis, according to the ICD-10 codes list
- Bundesstraße 87, a German road
- Weißensee Straße, an Austrian road
- Kidman Way, route B87 connecting the Riverina with Bourke in NSW, Australia
