= Hořovičky =

- Municipality
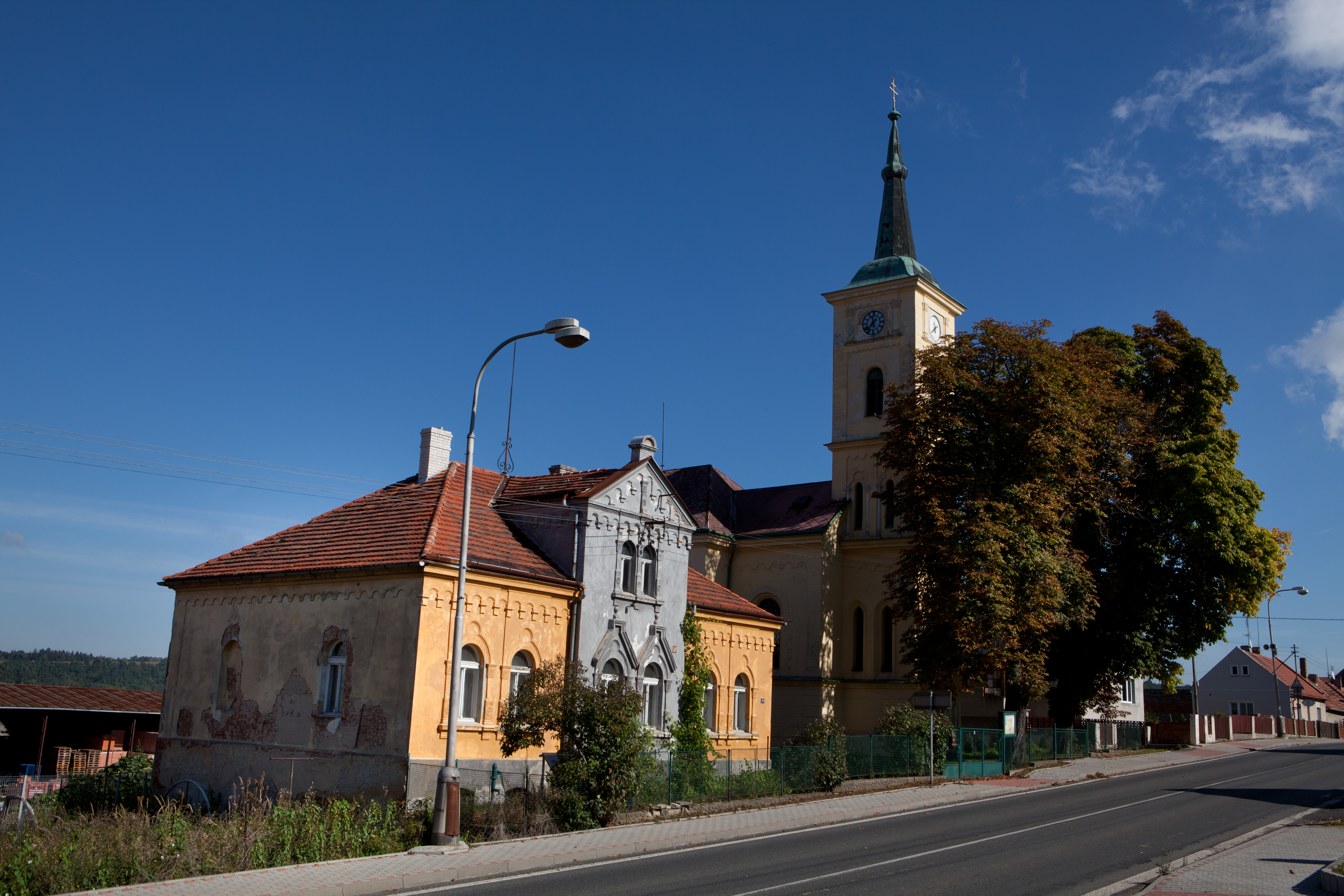
- Church of Saints Cyril and Methodius

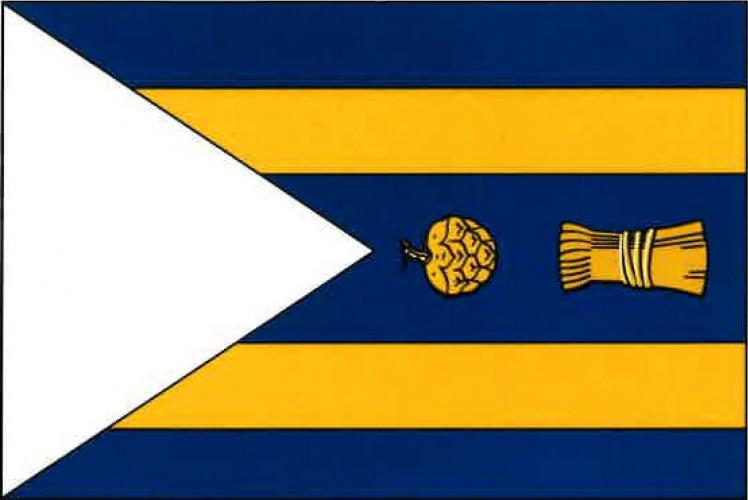
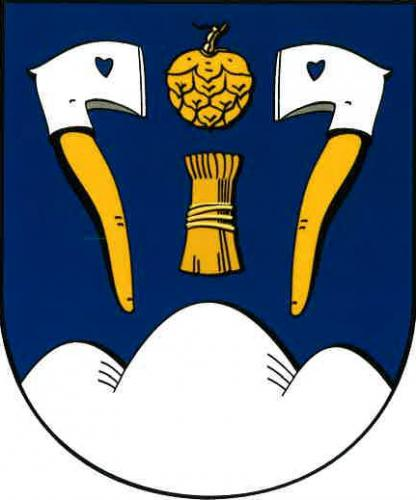
- Flag Coat of arms

- Location in the Czech Republic
- Coordinates: 50°9′21″N 13°31′53″E
- Country: Czech Republic
- Region: Central Bohemian
- District: Rakovník
- First mentioned: 1392

Area
  - Total: 19.13 km^{2} (7.39 sq mi)
- Elevation: 369 m (1,211 ft)

Population (2026-01-01)
  - Total: 491
  - Density: 25.7/km^{2} (66.5/sq mi)
- Time zone: UTC+1 (CET)
  - Summer (DST): UTC+2 (CEST)
- Postal code: 270 04
- Website: www.horovicky.cz

Hořovičky (until 1947 Německé Hořovice; German: Deutsch Horowitz) is a municipality and village in Rakovník District in the Central Bohemian Region of the Czech Republic. It has about 500 inhabitants.

== Administrative division ==
Hořovičky consists of four municipal parts (in brackets population according to the 2021 census):

- Hořovičky (276)
- Bukov (50)
- Hokov (84)
- Vrbice (38)

== Etymology ==
The initial name Hořovice was derived from the personal name Hoř or Hora, meaning "the village of Hoř's/Hora's people". The attribute Německé, which was used in the first half of the 20th century, meant 'German' and was used to distinguish it from the town of Hořovice. The municipality was then renamed to Hořovičky, which is a diminutive of Hořovice.

== Geography ==
Hořovičky is located about 15 kilometres (9 mi) northwest of Rakovník and 57 km (35 mi) west of Prague. It lies in the Rakovník Uplands. The highest point is at 498 m (1,634 ft) above sea level.

== History ==
The first written mention of Hořovice is from 1392.

In 1947, the municipality was renamed to its current name.

== Demographics ==
Historical population

Year	Pop.	±%
1869	985	—
1880	1,065	+8.1%
1890	1,083	+1.7%
1900	1,135	+4.8%
1910	1,244	+9.6%

Year	Pop.	±%
1921	1,243	−0.1%
1930	1,310	+5.4%
1950	641	−51.1%
1961	618	−3.6%
1970	498	−19.4%

Year	Pop.	±%
1980	497	−0.2%
1991	446	−10.3%
2001	419	−6.1%
2011	479	+14.3%
2021	448	−6.5%

Source: Censuses

== Transport ==
The I/6 road (part of the European route E48) runs through the municipality. It replaces the unfinished section of the D6 motorway from Prague to Karlovy Vary.

== Sights ==
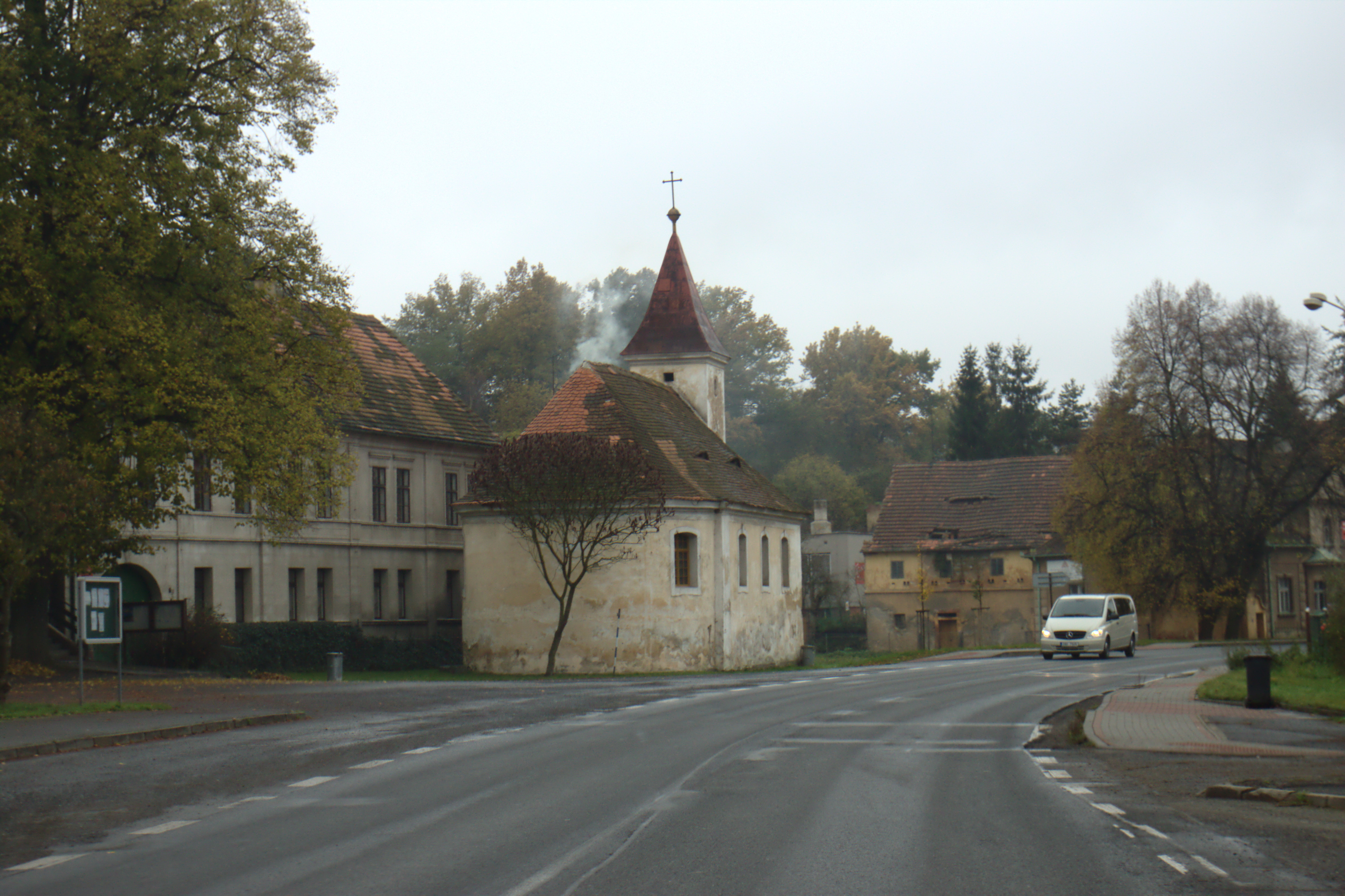
Church of the Holy Trinity

There are three churches in the municipality, all protected as cultural monuments. The Church of the Holy Trinity is a small late Baroque church with a Neoclassical façade. The Church of Saints Cyril and Methodius was built in the Neo-Romanesque style in the early 20th century. It was built for the Protestant Church and today serves the Orthodox Church. The Church of the Exaltation of the Holy Cross in located in the village of Vrbice. It is also a Neo-Romanesque building.

Tobiášův vrch is a steel telecommunication tower on the lower peak of the eponymous hill, which also serves as an observation tower. The telecommunication mast is 48 m (157 ft) high and the observation deck is at a height of 25 m (82 ft).
