= Bundesstraße 320 =

Federal highway in Germany

B 320
- Bundesstraße 320

Route information
- Length: 51 km (32 mi)

Major junctions
- West end: Groß Leine
- East end: Guben

Location
- Country: Germany
- States: Brandenburg

Highway system
- Roads in Germany; Autobahns; List; Federal; List; State; E-roads

The Bundesstraße 320 (B320) is a German federal highway in the state of Brandenburg, starting near the Polish border at Guben.

== History ==
In 1938, this number was first assigned to a federal highway that led from Prenzlau in an easterly direction to the newly built Bundesautobahn 11. During East German reign, this road was downgraded; the number 320 was instead assigned to a new road, leading from Lübben past Straupitz and Lieberose to Guben near the Polish border. In 2004, the path was changed so it doesn't start at Lübben, but rather further to the north near the village of Groß Leine where it seamlessly connects to the Bundesstraße 179 coming from Königs Wusterhausen.
