= Bundesstraße 326 =

Federal highway in Germany

B 326
- Bundesstraße 326

Route information
- Length: 5.4 km (3.4 mi)

Major junctions
- West end: Düsseldorf
- East end: Wuppertal

Location
- Country: Germany
- States: North Rhine-Westphalia

Highway system
- Roads in Germany; Autobahns; List; Federal; List; State; E-roads

The Bundesstraße 326 is a German federal highway, connecting the cities of Düsseldorf and Wuppertal in North Rhine-Westphalia.

Originally constructed in the 1930s as a connection of Düsseldorf with the newly built Bundesautobahn 3, the planned continuation to Wuppertal could not be started due to the war. After the war, construction continued and reached the western border of Wuppertal in 1957. The missing link to the north of Wuppertal was finished in 1974 and subsequently the whole road was upgraded to the Bundesautobahn 46.

Today, only two short strips of road are still labeled as the Bundesstraße 326: one strip in Düsseldorf leading from the Bundesstraße 1 to the A 46, and another short strip leading from the end of the A 46 in Wuppertal to the local road network.
