= Bundesstraße 45 =

Federal highway in Germany

B 45
- Bundesstraße 45

Route information
- Length: 156 km (97 mi)

Major junctions
- North end: Wöllstadt
- South end: Sinsheim

Location
- Country: Germany
- States: Hesse, Baden-Württemberg

Highway system
- Roads in Germany; Autobahns; List; Federal; List; State; E-roads

The Bundesstraße 45 is a German federal highway. It branches off the Bundesstraße 3 in Wöllstadt and leads south, goes through the city of Hanau, traverses the Odenwald and ends in Sinsheim.

The strip between Hanau and Dieburg was originally built and labeled as the Bundesautobahn 683, while the Bundesstraße 45 went through the cities. The A 683 was later downgraded and made part of the Bundesstraße 45.
