= Bundesstraße 468 =

Federal highway in Germany

B 468
- Bundesstraße 468
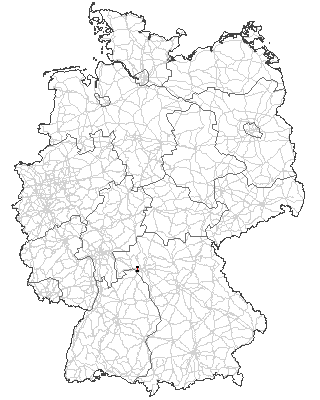

Route information
- Length: 1.3 km (0.81 mi)

Location
- Country: Germany
- States: Bavaria

Highway system
- Roads in Germany; Autobahns; List; Federal; List; State; E-roads

The Bundesstraße 468 is a German federal highway. It serves to connect the Bundesstraße 8 between Mädelhofen and Waldbüttelbrunn with the nearby Bundesautobahn 3. With a length of 1.3 kilometers, the Bundesstraße 468 is currently the shortest federal highway in the German federal highway network.
