= Bundesstraße 46 =

Federal highway in Germany

B 46
- Bundesstraße 46

Route information
- Length: 7.5 km (4.7 mi)
- History: Downgraded to L3313 in 2010

Major junctions
- From: Offenbach am Main
- To: Dreieich

Location
- Country: Germany
- States: Hesse

Highway system
- Roads in Germany; Autobahns; List; Federal; List; State; E-roads

The Bundesstraße 46 was a former German federal highway.

It led from Offenbach am Main, where it branched off from the Bundesstraße 43, in a southerly direction to Sprendlingen, where it connected to the Bundesstraße 3. The 7-kilometre-long (4.3 mi) road was constructed in the 1820s by the Grand Duchy of Hesse to avoid the territory of the Free City of Frankfurt. Due to the Bundesautobahn 661 running directly parallel, the road was downgraded to a Landesstraße (L3313) starting in 2010.

== See also ==
- List of federal highways in Germany
