= Bundesstraße 178 =

Federal highway in Germany

B 178
- Bundesstraße 178

Route information
- Length: 30.6 km (19.0 mi) 11 km planned

Major junctions
- North end: Weißenberg
- South end: Polish border in Zittau

Location
- Country: Germany
- States: Saxony

Highway system
- Roads in Germany; Autobahns; List; Federal; List; State; E-roads

Bundesstraße 178 (B178) is a German federal highway in the east of Saxony. It was built as a dual carriageway, and the highway connects with the motorway A4 near the city of Weißenberg in Saxony. It ends at Zittau, close to the border to both Poland and the Czech Republic.

After crossing the Polish border, the road continues as the voivodeship road DW 332, a short highway that reaches the Czech border after a few kilometres, where the Czech dual-carriageway R35 begins. In the future the road will be an international corridor in Central Europe, connecting Germany with the west of Poland (Lower Silesian Voivodeship) and the Czech Republic.

The road is about 31 kilometres (19 mi) long. The planned length, however, is 42 kilometres (26 mi).
