= Bundesstraße 93 =

Federal highway in Germany

B 93
- Bundesstraße 93

Route information
- Length: 76 km (47 mi)

Major junctions
- From: Borna, Leipzig
- To: Schneeberg

Location
- Country: Germany
- States: Saxony; Thüringia

Highway system
- Roads in Germany; Autobahns; List; Federal; List; State; E-roads

The Bundesstraße 93 (Abbreviation: B 93) is a road in the German states of Saxony and Thuringia. It goes from Borna, Leipzig to Schneeberg. It is the main route between Leipzig and Zwickau.

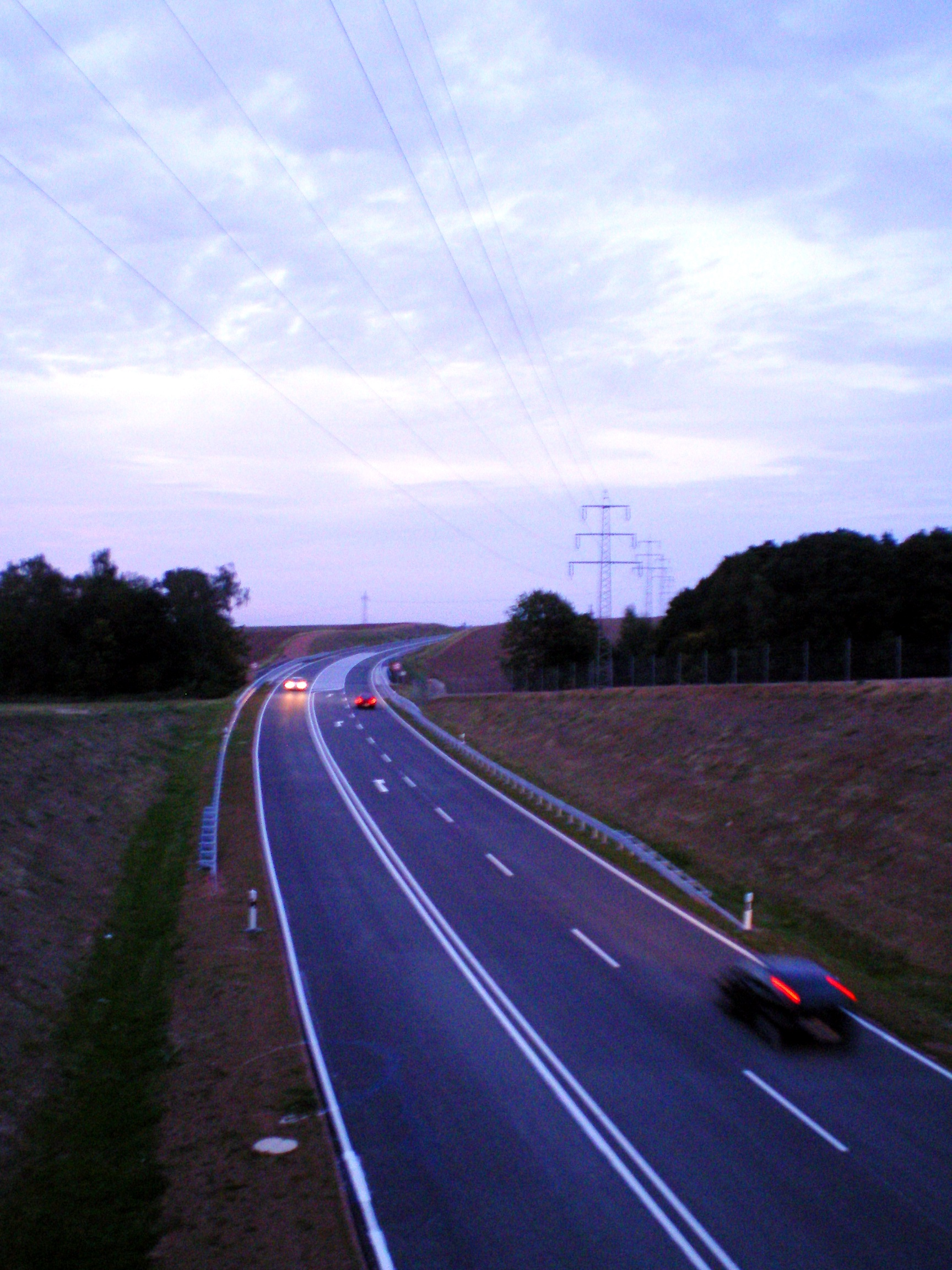
Bypass around Gößnitz between Leipzig and Zwickau

== Route ==
- The road goes through the following districts: Leipzig (district) – Altenburger Land – Zwickau (district) – Erzgebirgskreis
- Towns on the B 93: Borna, Leipzig – Altenburg – Gößnitz – Meerane – Zwickau – Wilkau-Haßlau – Schneeberg

The road goes alongside the following rivers: Pleiße, Zwickauer Mulde.

== See also ==
- List of roads in Saxony
- List of federal roads in Germany
