= Bundesstraße 327 =

Federal highway in Germany

B 327
- Bundesstraße 327

Route information
- Length: 140 km (87 mi)

Major junctions
- North end: Koblenz
- South end: Hermeskeil

Location
- Country: Germany
- States: Rhineland-Palatinate

Highway system
- Roads in Germany; Autobahns; List; Federal; List; State; E-roads

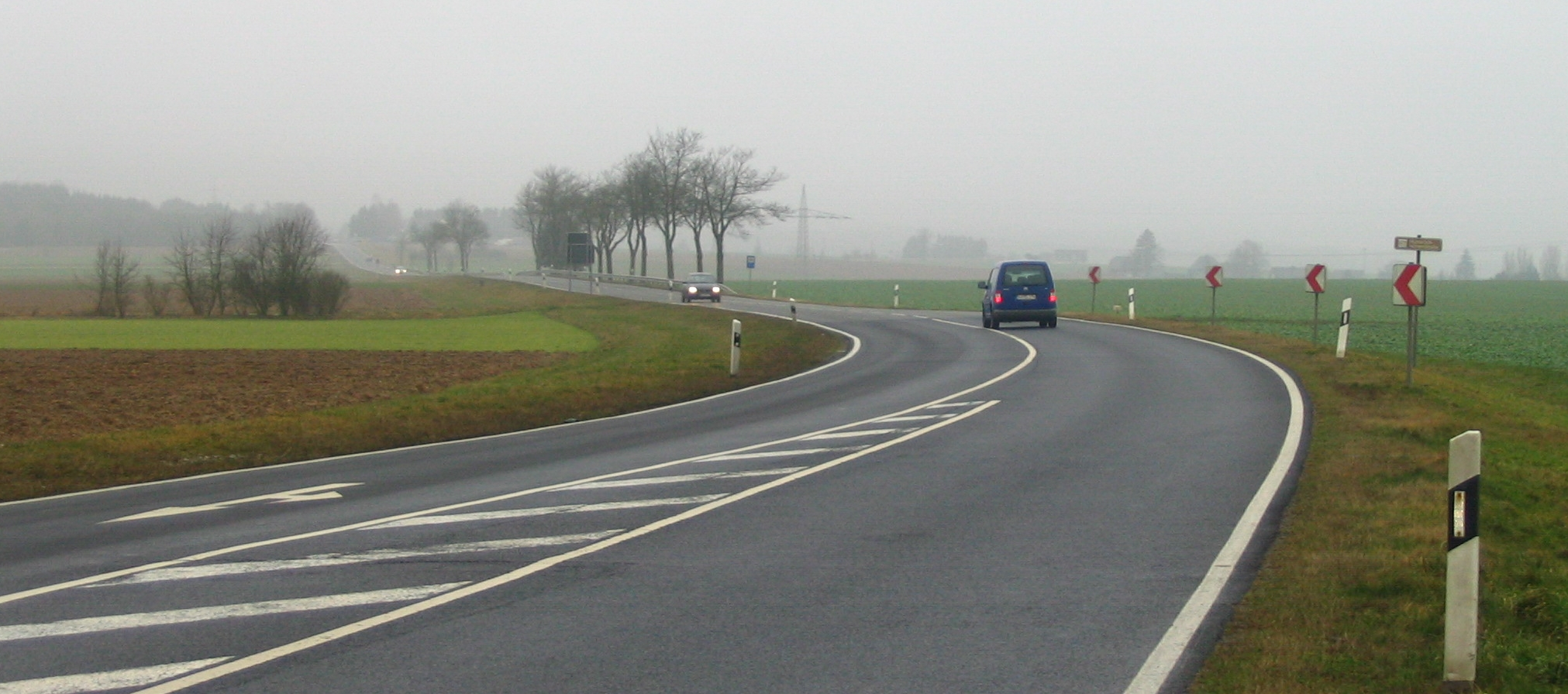
Bundesstraße 327 near Rödelhausen

The Bundesstraße 327 is a German federal highway. It was built in 1938 and 1939 by the Organisation Todt as a strategic road leading from Koblenz over the Hunsrück mountain range to the Westwall near Perl.

After the war, the west part of the road after Hermeskeil was relabeled as the Bundesstraße 407, while the Bundesstraße 327 went south to Riegelsberg near Saarbrücken. This part was later demoted after the Bundesautobahn 1 was built, as such the Bundesstraße 327 now ends in Hermeskeil.

There is currently a gap in the federal road due to the extension of the runway of Frankfurt-Hahn Airport, which required demolition of one segment of road.
