= Bundesstraße 92 =

Federal highway in Germany

B 92
- Bundesstraße 92

Route information
- Length: 99 km (62 mi)

Major junctions
- From: Gera
- To: Bad Brambach

Location
- Country: Germany
- States: Thuringia, Sachsen

Highway system
- Roads in Germany; Autobahns; List; Federal; List; State; E-roads

The Bundesstraße 92 (Federal route 92) (abbreviation: B 92) is a Bundesstraße through the states of Thuringia and Saxony, Germany.

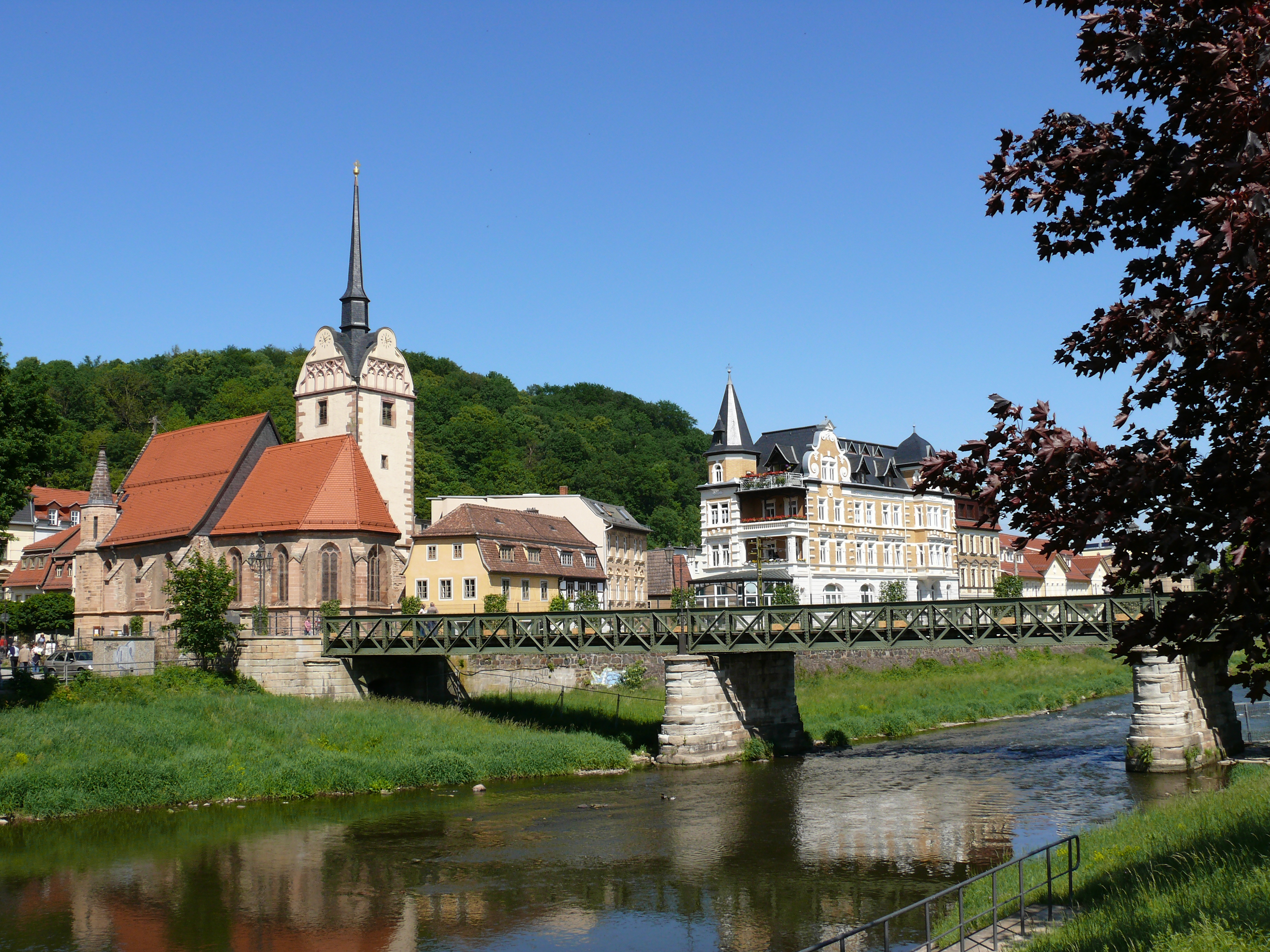
Gera-Untermhaus

== History ==
The stretch of road from Elsterberg - Schönbach (Vogtland) was built since 1854 .

During the Nazi-era, from 1938 to 1945 the road was known Reichsstraße 92 (R 92). It began originally in Böhlen near Leipzig and went via Zeitz through Gera and then into the then-annexed area of the Sudetenland (in modern-day Czech Republic) via Františkovy Lázně, Mariánské Lázně, Bor (Tachov District), Horšovský Týn, Klatovy, Strakonice to Vodňany near České Budějovice.

In East Germany the road had the name Fernverkehrsstraße 92 (F 92).

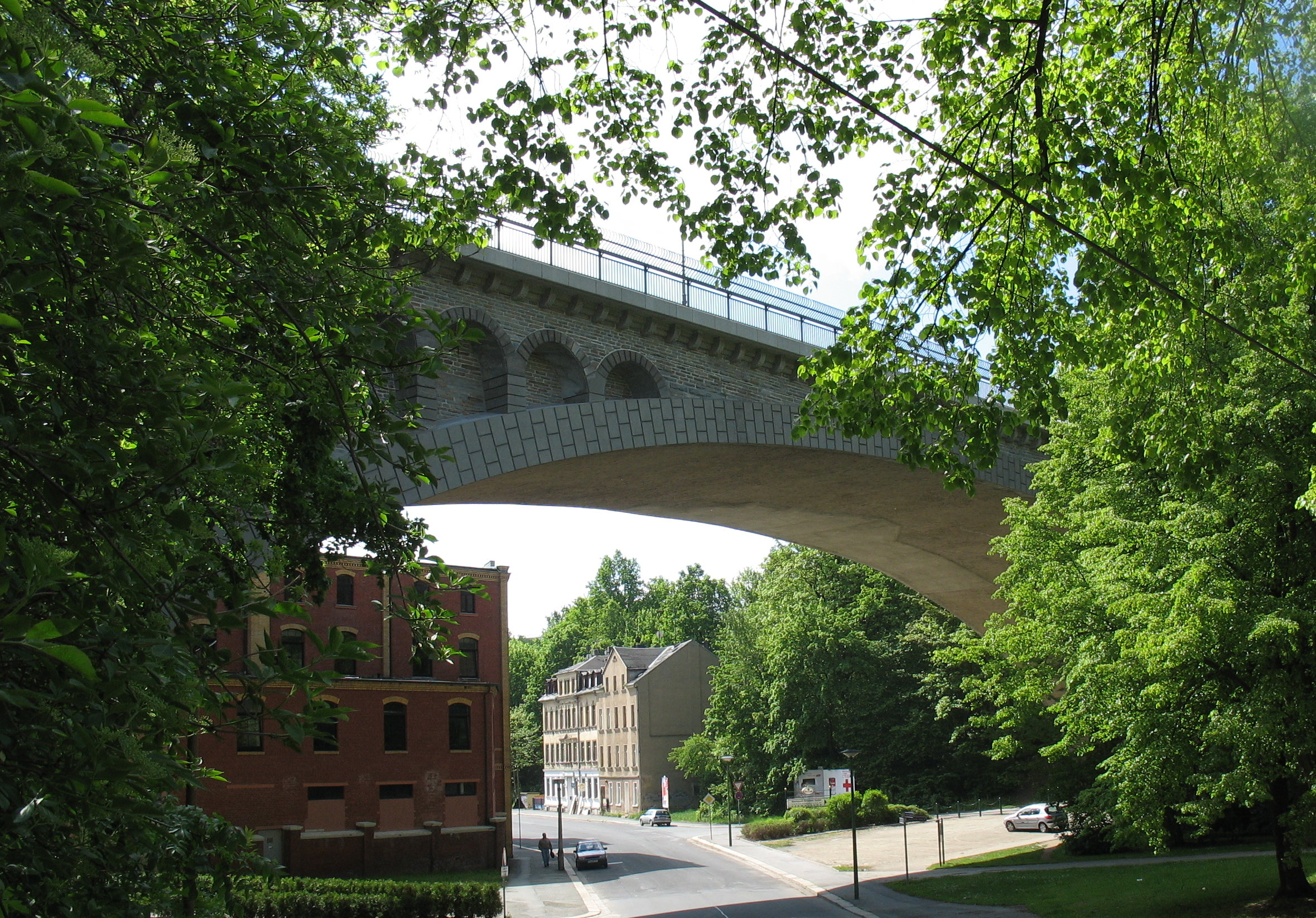
The Peace Bridge in Plauen

== See also ==
- European route E49
- List of federal highways in Germany
- List of roads in Saxony
- List of roads in Saxony
