= Elster Viaduct (Pirk) =

Elster Viaduct Elstertalbrücke
- Coordinates: 50°25′42″N 12°04′15″E
- Carries: Bundesautobahn 72
- Crosses: Elster valley
- Locale: Pirk

Characteristics
- Design: Stone arch

History
- Construction start: 1937
- Opened: 1993
- Rebuilt: 1990

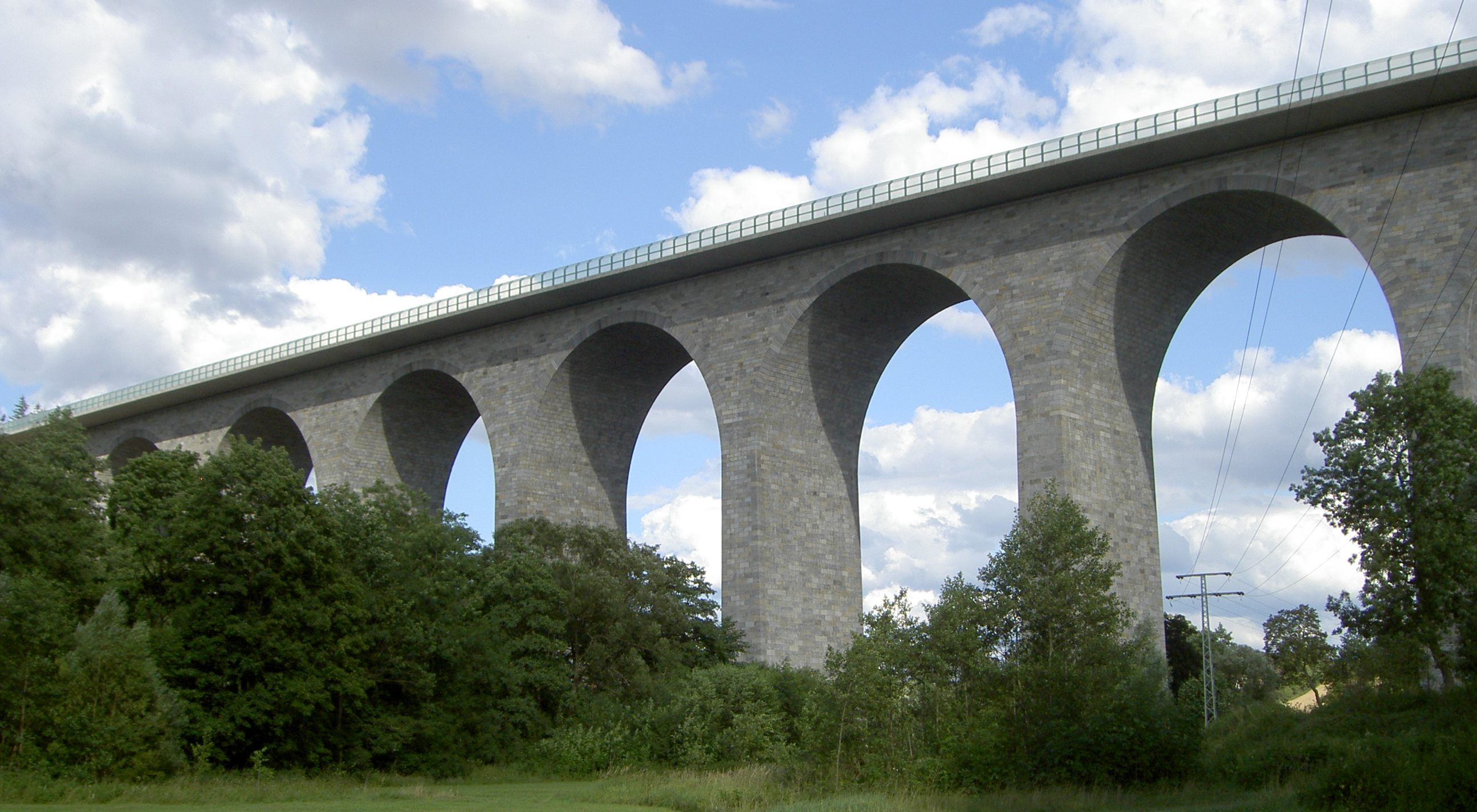

The Elster Viaduct is a stone motorway bridge near Pirk, part of Weischlitz municipality, Germany. It carries the motorway Bundesautobahn 72. Although building began in 1937, it did not open to traffic until 1993.

== History ==
Construction began in 1937, but halted again in 1940 due to World War II. The bridge could not be finished until after German reunification because after the war it lay in the restricted area of the East German state. In June 1990 preliminary investigations began, and building restarted in September 1990. In August 1993 the bridge was finally opened to traffic.
