= Büderich =

Büderich may refer to:

- Büderich (Meerbusch), a borough of Meerbusch, Nordrhein-Westfalen, Germany
- Büderich (Werl), a borough of Werl, Nordrhein-Westfalen, Germany
- Büderich (Wesel), a borough of Wesel, Nordrhein-Westfalen, Germany
  - Prisoner of War camp Büderich, a 1945 American POW camp in Büderich (Wesel)
- Péry, formerly called Büderich in German, canton of Bern, Switzerland
