= Bundesstraße 87 =

Federal highway in Germany

B 87
- Bundesstraße 87

Route information
- Length: 317 km (197 mi)

Major junctions
- From: Frankfurt (Oder)
- To: Ilmenau

Location
- Country: Germany
- States: Brandenburg, Sachsen, Sachsen-Anhalt, Thüringen

Highway system
- Roads in Germany; Autobahns; List; Federal; List; State; E-roads

The Bundesstraße 87 (Abbreviation: B 87) is a Bundesstraße in Germany. It begins in Ilmenau and ends in Frankfurt (Oder). In Thüringia it runs partly along the Straße der Romanik.

== History ==
=== Origin ===
The modern-day Bundesstraße 87 has been in use since medieval times as a connection between Frankfurt (Oder) and Leipzig. Between Leipzig and Eckartsberga it follows the historical route of the Via Regia. This section was upgraded to a highway by 1819. The connection as far as Eilenburg was upgraded in 1845. To upgrade the stretch from Eilenburg to Frankfurt (Oder), a company limited by shares was founded on 20 November 1854. The Frankfurt an der Oder Leipziger Chausseebaugesellschaft was headquartered in Lübben. This section ran from Eilenburg through Torgau, Herzberg, Schlieben, Luckau, Lübben, Beeskow and Müllrose to Frankfurt (Oder). The easternmost section between Beeskow and Frankfurt (Oder) was completed in 1856.

=== Earlier Descriptions ===
The Prussian State Highway 33 (German: preußische Staatschaussee Nr. 33 went from Frankfurt (Oder) to Leipzig. From Leipzig the Prussian State Highway 69 ran to Weißenfels. In Weißenfels this road connected with the Prussian State Highway 66, which ran from Halle (Saale) to Weimar.

In 1932 the road was renamed Fernverkehrsstraße 87 (FVS 87), and in 1934 Reichsstraße 87 (R 87) by the Nazis, connecting with the former Fernverkehrsstraße 7 (which later became Reichsstraße 7) at Umpferstedt (between Jena and Weimar). In 1961 the so-called Fernverkehrsstraße 87 (F 87) was extended from Umpferstedt to Ilmenau.

=== Replacements ===
Since 2005 the Bundesstraße 87 runs between the Lützen South (A 38) and Weißenfels (A 9) via the autobahns A38 and A9; the previous connection between Weißenfels and Lützen was renamed as a Landstrasse L188.

=== Further Plans ===
Since 1996 the extension from Meiningen to Fulda has been planned as Bundesstraße 87n.

=== Bridges ===
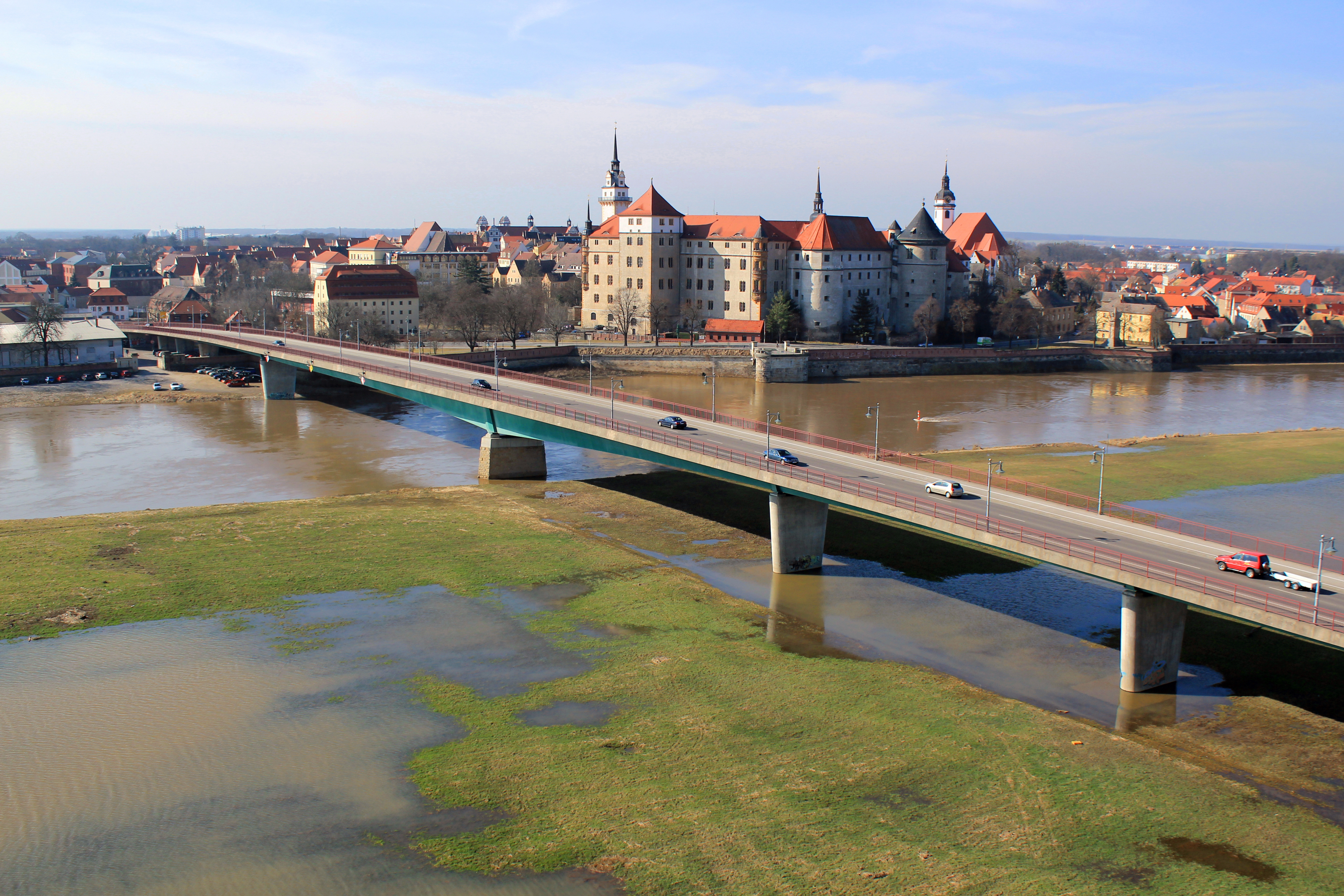
B87, Bridge over the river Elbe at Torgau with the river in flood. Hartenfels Castle is in the background.

- Bridge over the river Elbe in Torgau
- Zeppelin Bridge over the Elster Basin in Leipzig
- Bridge over the river Saale in Bad Kösen, built in 1891 as replacement for a stone bridge from the 14th Century

== See also ==
- List of roads in Saxony
- Ranstädter Steinweg
