= Krupá (Rakovník District) =

- Municipality
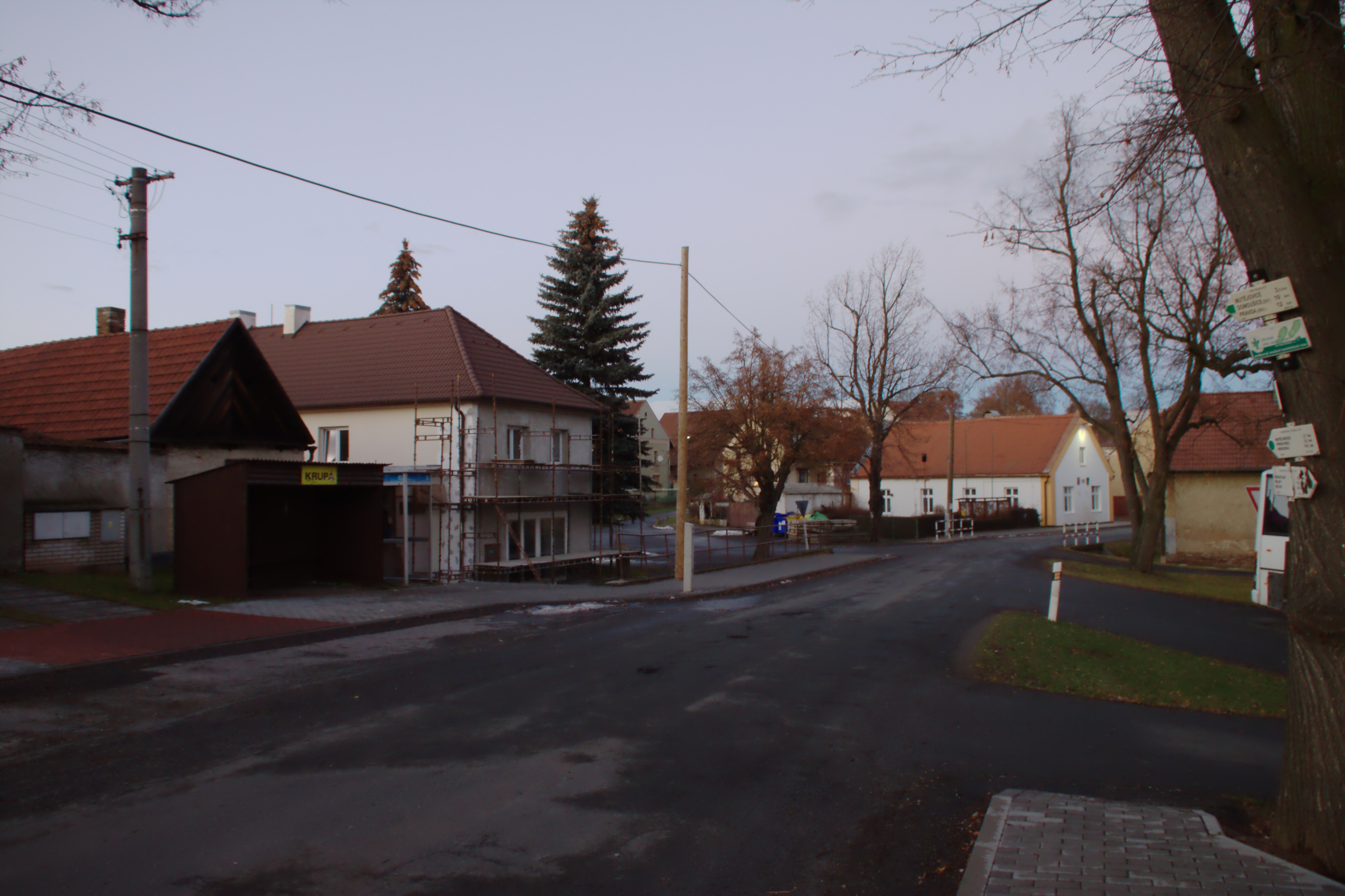
- Centre of Krupá

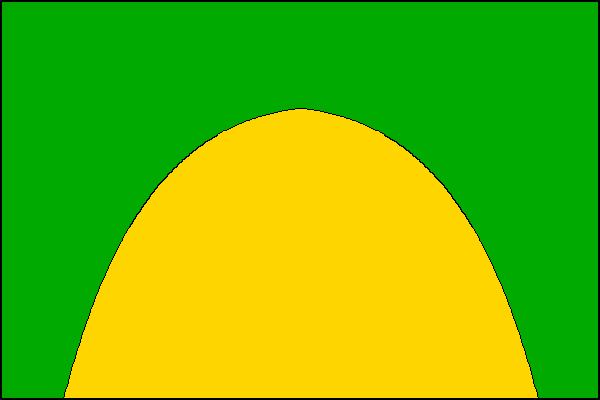
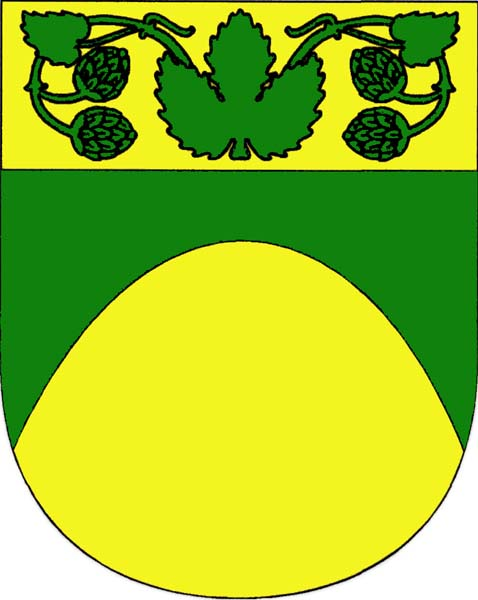
- Flag Coat of arms

- Location in the Czech Republic
- Coordinates: 50°10′30″N 13°43′54″E
- Country: Czech Republic
- Region: Central Bohemian
- District: Rakovník
- First mentioned: 1353

Area
  - Total: 7.43 km^{2} (2.87 sq mi)
- Elevation: 363 m (1,191 ft)

Population (2026-01-01)
  - Total: 459
  - Density: 61.8/km^{2} (160/sq mi)
- Time zone: UTC+1 (CET)
  - Summer (DST): UTC+2 (CEST)
- Postal code: 270 09
- Website: www.obec-krupa.cz

Krupá is a municipality and village in Rakovník District in the Central Bohemian Region of the Czech Republic. It has about 500 inhabitants.

== Demographics ==
Historical population
Year	Pop.	±%
1869	717	—
1880	714	−0.4%
1890	734	+2.8%
1900	744	+1.4%
1910	784	+5.4%
1921	903	+15.2%
1930	938	+3.9%
1950	764	−18.6%
1961	735	−3.8%
1970	655	−10.9%
1980	568	−13.3%
1991	446	−21.5%
2001	436	−2.2%
2011	471	+8.0%
2021	437	−7.2%
Source: Censuses
