= Neuensalz =

- Municipality
- Location of Neuensalz within Vogtlandkreis district
- Interactive map of Neuensalz
- Location within Germany Location within Saxony
- Coordinates: 50°31′5″N 12°13′14″E
- Country: Germany
- State: Saxony
- District: Vogtlandkreis
- Subdivisions: 5

Government
  - Mayor (2022–29): Carmen Künzel

Area
  - Total: 33.49 km^{2} (12.93 sq mi)
- Elevation: 417 m (1,368 ft)

Population (2025-12-31)
  - Total: 2,007
  - Density: 59.93/km^{2} (155.2/sq mi)
- Time zone: UTC+01:00 (CET)
  - Summer (DST): UTC+02:00 (CEST)
- Postal codes: 08541
- Dialling codes: 03741
- Vehicle registration: V, AE, OVL, PL, RC
- Website: www.neuensalz.de

Neuensalz is a municipality in the Vogtlandkreis district, in Saxony, Germany.
