= European route E49 =

Road in trans-European E-road network

E49

Route information
- Length: 759 km (472 mi)

Major junctions
- North end: Magdeburg, Germany
- South end: Vienna, Austria

Location
- Countries: Germany; Czech Republic; Austria

Highway system
- International E-road network; A Class; B Class

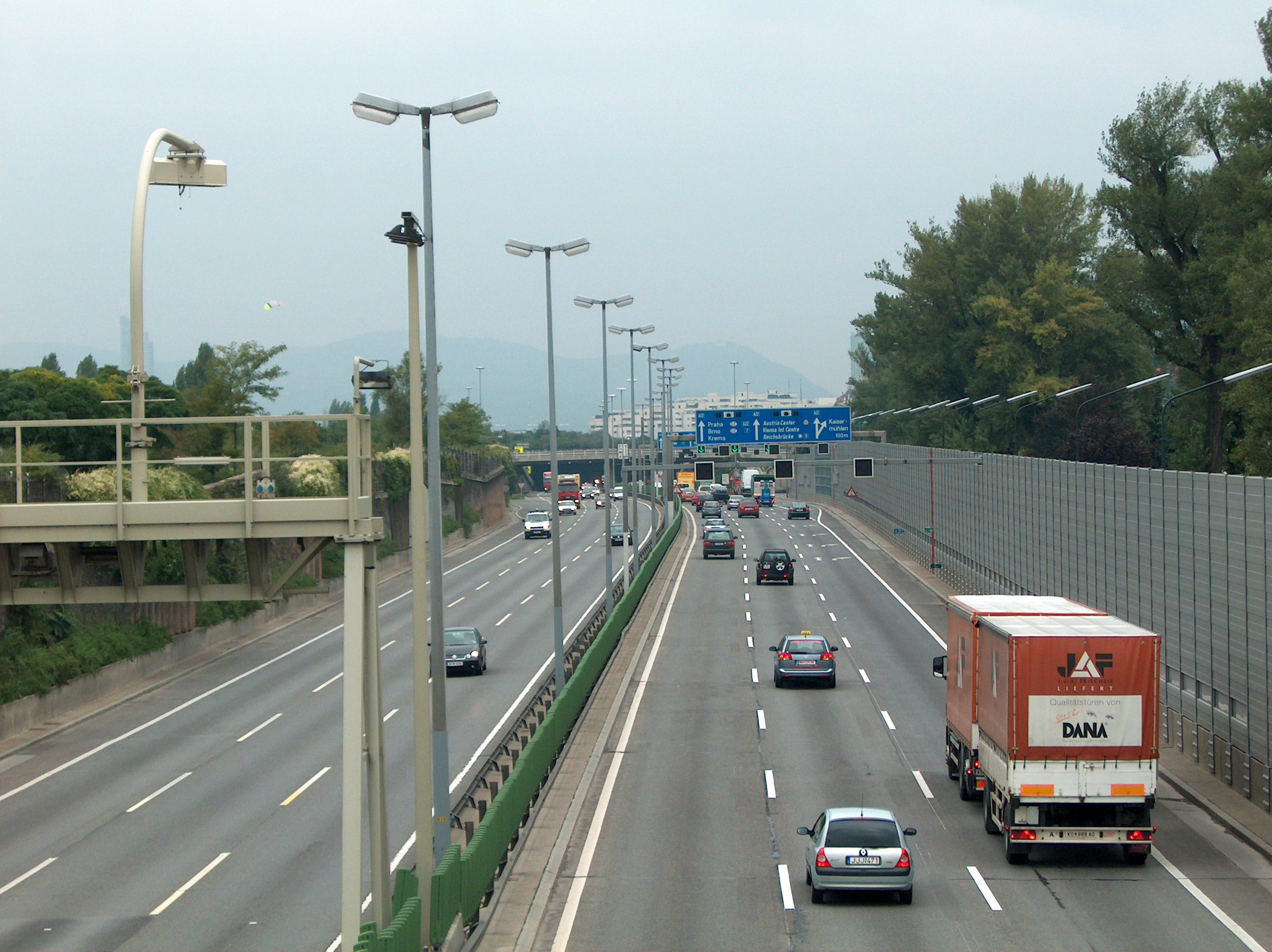
E 49 routed on A22 in Vienna

European route E49 is a road that forms part of the International E-road network. It runs between Magdeburg, Germany, and Vienna, Austria.

The road follows the route:

- Germany
  - A 14: - Magdeburg, Halle, Saxony-Anhalt,
  - B 282:
  - B 92: - Plauen
- Czech Republic
  - I/21
  - D 6 / I/6: Cheb, Karlovy Vary
  - I/20: Plzeň, Písek, České Budějovice
  - I/34: Třeboň
  - I/24
- Austria
  - B 2: Horn
  - B 4: Stockerau
  - A 22: Vienna
