= Bundesstraße 186 =

Federal highway in Germany

B 186
- Bundesstraße 186

Route information
- Length: 31 km (19 mi)

Major junctions
- North end: Schkeuditz
- South end: Zwenkau

Location
- Country: Germany
- States: Saxony

Highway system
- Roads in Germany; Autobahns; List; Federal; List; State; E-roads

The Bundesstraße 186 is a German federal highway.

== History ==
Originally, this road ran from Köthen to Bitterfeld. During East German rule, the number 186 was reassigned to a loop running around the city of Leipzig. Due to brown coal mining, two strips of road in the north (between Schkeuditz and Taucha) and the south (between Zwenkau and Markkleeberg) had to be demolished, splitting up the road into two segments.

In 2010, the eastern segment was degraded, leaving only the western segment.
