= European route E48 =

Road in trans-European E-road network

E48

Major junctions
- West end: Schweinfurt, Germany
- To: Prague, Czech Republic

Location
- Countries: Germany, Czech Republic

Highway system
- International E-road network; A Class; B Class

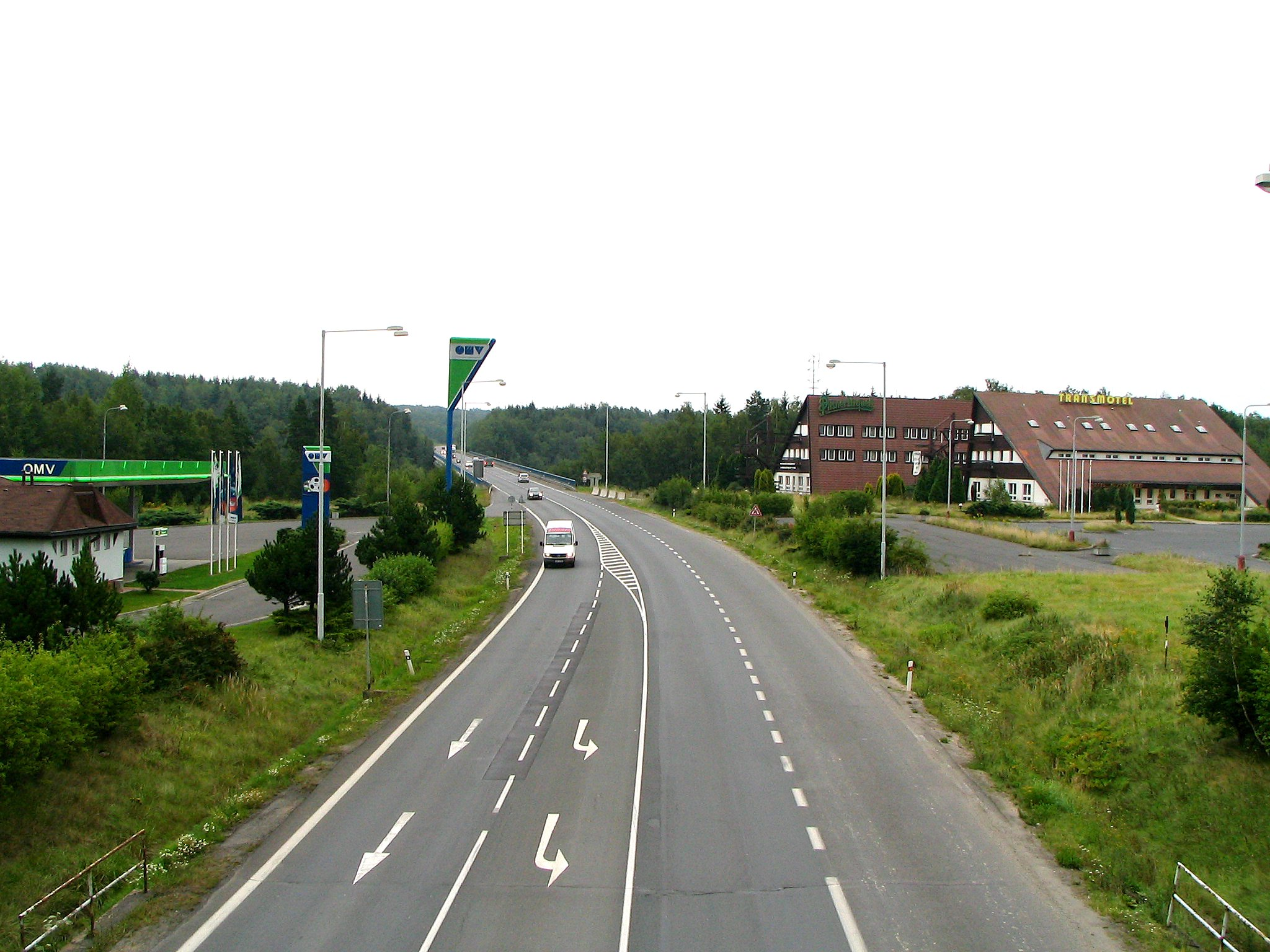
E 48 routed on I/6 near Sokolov

European route E48 is a road that is part of the International E-road network. It runs between Schweinfurt, Germany and Prague, Czech Republic.

The road follows the route:

- Germany
  - A 70: Schweinfurt, Bayreuth
  - B 303: Marktredwitz
- Czech Republic
  - D 6 / I/6: Cheb, Karlovy Vary, Prague
