= List of federal highways in Germany =

Label of the German Bundesstraße 7

The following is a list of the German federal highways or Bundesstraßen. This does not include the autobahns.

== Numbering system ==
The Bundesstraßen do not have a numbering system like that used for German autobahns (motorways), but they do have a clockwise regional numbering system:

- B 1 to B 10 across Germany from border to border
- B 11 to B 26 in Southeastern Germany (Bavaria)
- B 27 to B 39 in Southwestern Germany (Baden-Württemberg)
- B 40 to B 53 in Southwestern Germany (Rhineland-Palatinate)
- B 54 to B 68 in Western Germany (North Rhine-Westphalia)
- B 69 to B 83 in Northern Germany (Lower Saxony and Schleswig-Holstein)
- B 84 to B 100 in Central Germany (Saxony and Thuringia)
- B 101 to B 112 in Northeastern Germany (Brandenburg, Mecklenburg-Vorpommern)
- R 113 to R 125 in Pomerania and Silesia (no longer in Germany)
- R 126 to R 138 in East Prussia (no longer in Germany)
- B 139 to B 327 were assigned in 1937 in a similar way (but counterclockwise, beginning in East Prussia)
- B 328 to B 432 were assigned during World War II in territories occupied by Germany, including Austria, Czech Republic, Poland, France, Belgium etc. Most of them no longer exist, notable exceptions include the Bundesstraße 378 and the Bundesstraße 388.
- B 399 to B 535 were assigned after 1950 in chronological order

== Legend ==
Brief description
Background information (maps, pictures, etc.) available
Number no longer exists, because road has been fully upgraded to motorway status
Highway downgraded to a local road due to a (mostly complete nearby) motorway
Number no longer exists (change of other route, etc.)
Highway planned or under construction

== List of German Bundesstraßen ==
=== B 1 – B 100 ===
B 1 B 1a	B 2 B 2 R B 2a	B 3 B 3n	B 4 B 4 R B 4a B 4f	B 5	B 6 B 6n	B 7 B 7a	B 8	B 9	B 10
B 11; B 11a	B 12; B 12n	B 13; B 13n	B 14; B 14n	B 15; B 15n	B 16; B 16a B 16n	B 17	B 18; B 18a	B 19	B 20
B 21	B 22	B 23	B 24	B 25	B 26; B 26a B 26n	B 27; B 27a	B 28; B 28a	B 29; B 29a	B 30
B 31; B 31a	B 32	B 33; B 33a	B 34	B 35	B 36	B 37	B 38; B 38a	B 39; B 39a	B 40; B 40a
B 41	B 42	B 43; B 43a	B 44	B 45	B 46	B 47; B 47a B 47n	B 48	B 49	B 50
B 51	B 52	B 53	B 54; B 54n	B 55; B 55a	B 56; B 56n	B 57	B 58 B58n	B 59	B 60
B 61; B 61n	B 62; B 62n	B 63	B 64; B 64n	B 65	B 66; B 66n	B 67; B 67n	B 68	B 69	B 70
B 71; B 71n	B 72; B 72a	B 73	B 74; B 74n	B 75	B 76	B 77		B 79	B 80
B 81	B 82	B 83	B 84	B 85	B 86	B 87; B 87n	B 88	B 89	B 90; B 90n
B 91	B 92	B 93	B 94	B 95	B 96; B 96a B 96b B 96n	B 97	B 98	B 99	B 100

=== B 101 – B 200 ===
B 101; B 101n	B 102	B 103	B 104	B 105	B 106	B 107	B 108	B 109	B 110
B 111	B 112; B 112n	B 113		B 115		B 117			
	B 122								
B 131n									
					B 156; B 156a		B 158; B 158a		B 160
					B 166	B 167	B 168	B 169	B 170
B 171	B 172; B 172a B 172b	B 173	B 174	B 175; B 175n	B 176	B 177	B 178; B 178n	B 179	B 180
B 181	B 182	B 183; B 183a	B 184	B 185	B 186	B 187; B 187a	B 188	B 189; B 189n	B 190; B 190n
B 191	B 192	B 193	B 194	B 195	B 196; B 196a	B 197	B 198	B 199	B 200

=== B 201 – B 300 ===
B 201	B 202	B 203	B 204	B 205	B 206	B 207; B 207n	B 208	B 209	B 210; B 210a
B 211	B 212; B 212n	B 213	B 214	B 215	B 216	B 217	B 218	B 219	B 220
B 221	B 222	B 223	B 224	B 225	B 226	B 227; B 227n	B 228	B 229	B 230
B 231	B 232	B 233	B 234	B 235	B 236	B 237	B 238	B 239	B 240
B 241	B 242	B 243; B 243a	B 244	B 245; B 245a	B 246; B 246a	B 247	B 248; B 248a	B 249	B 250
B 251	B 252	B 253	B 254	B 255	B 256	B 257	B 258	B 259	B 260
B 261	B 262	B 263	B 264	B 265	B 266	B 267	B 268	B 269	B 270
B 271	B 272	B 273	B 274	B 275	B 276	B 277; B 277a	B 278	B 279	B 280
B 281; B 281a	B 282	B 283	B 284	B 285	B 286	B 287	B 288	B 289; B 289n	B 290
B 291	B 292	B 293	B 294	B 295	B 296	B 297	B 298	B 299; B 299a	B 300

=== B 301 – B 400 ===
B 301	B 302	B 303	B 304	B 305; B 305a	B 306	B 307	B 308	B 309	B 310
B 311	B 312	B 313	B 314	B 315	B 316	B 317	B 318	B 319	B 320
B 321	B 322	B 323	B 324		B 326	B 327			
									B 340
							B 378		
							B 388		
	B 392							B 399	B 400

=== B 401 – B 500 ===
B 401	B 402	B 403	B 404	B 405	B 406	B 407	B 408	B 409	B 410; B 410n
B 411	B 412	B 413	B 414	B 415	B 416	B 417	B 418	B 419	B 420
B 421	B 422	B 423	B 424	B 425	B 426	B 427	B 428	B 429	B 430
B 431	B 432	B 433	B 434	B 435	B 436	B 437	B 438	B 439	B 440
B 441	B 442	B 443	B 444	B 445	B 446	B 447	B 448	B 449	B 450
B 451	B 452	B 453	B 454	B 455	B 456	B 457	B 458	B 459	B 460
B 461	B 462	B 463	B 464	B 465	B 466; B 466a	B 467	B 468	B 469	B 470
B 471	B 472	B 473	B 474; B 474n	B 475; B 475n	B 476	B 477	B 478	B 479	B 480; B 480n
B 481	B 482	B 483	B 484	B 485	B 486	B 487	B 488	B 489	B 490
B 491	B 492	B 493	B 494	B 495	B 496	B 497	B 498	B 499	B 500

=== B 501 – B 588 ===
B 501	B 502	B 503	B 504	B 505	B 506	B 507	B 508	B 509	B 510
B 511	B 512	B 513	B 514	B 515	B 516	B 517	B 518	B 519	B 520
B 521	B 522	B 523	B 524	B 525			B 528		B 530
	B 532	B 533		B 535					
							B 588		

=== B 611 ===
611 is the highest number assigned so far.

B 611

=== B 999 ===
The number 999 is sometimes used for a new Bundesstraße before its final number is confirmed.

B 999

=== B E – B Z ===
The letters E to Z are replacement highways in former West Berlin.

B E		
B R	B S	B Z

== Bibliography ==
- "Bundesstraßenverzeichnis, Ausgabe 2009 (BVERZ 2009)" (PDF). Bundesanstalt für Straßenwesen. Federal Ministry for Digital and Transport. 30 October 2009.
