= Weitersfelden =

- Municipality
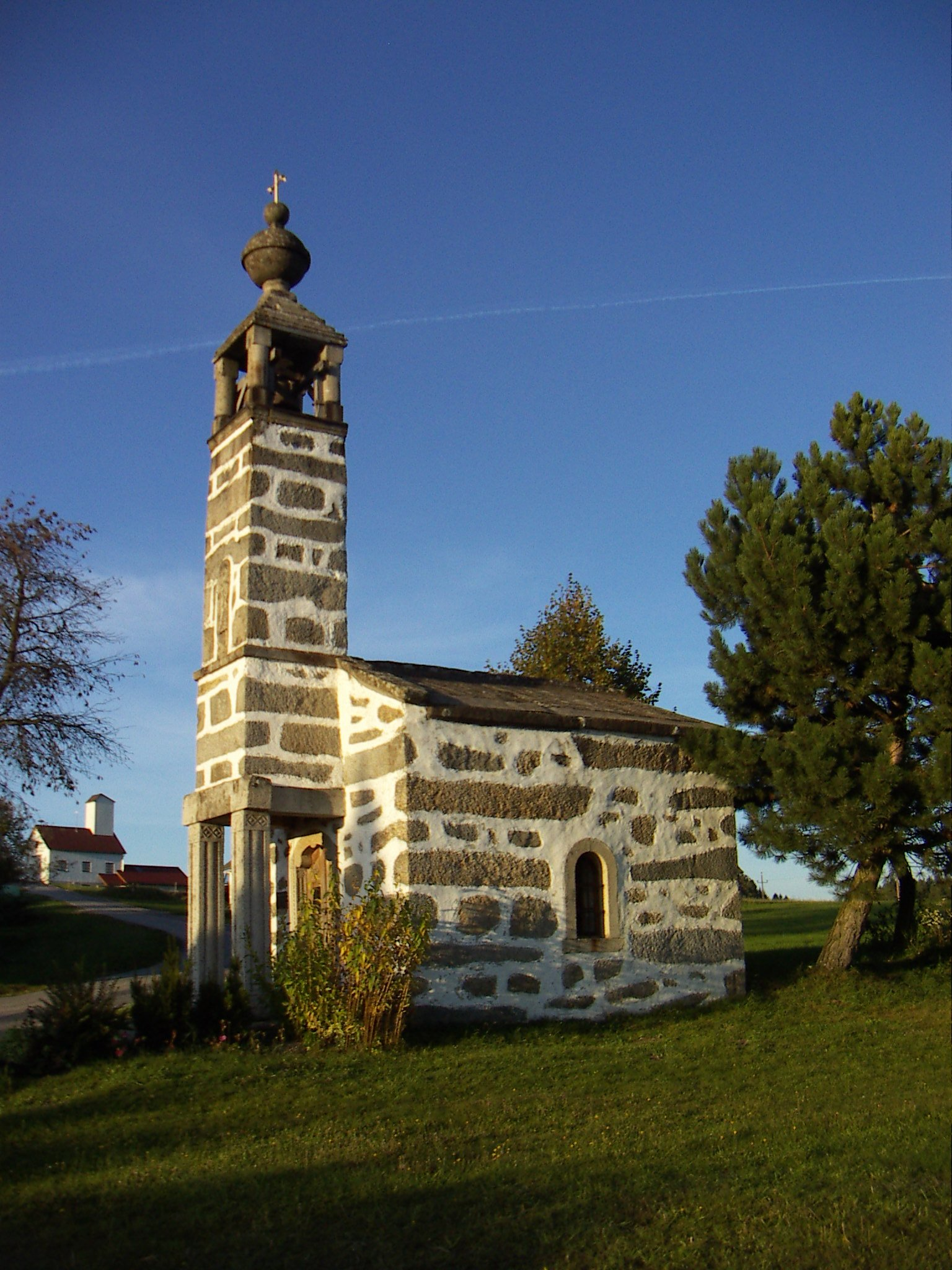

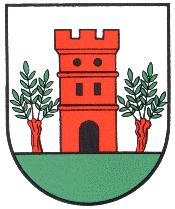
- Coat of arms

- Location within Austria
- Coordinates: 48°28′40″N 14°43′40″E
- Country: Austria
- State: Upper Austria
- District: Freistadt

Government
  - Mayor: Josef Mitmannsgruber (ÖVP)

Area
  - Total: 43.7 km^{2} (16.9 sq mi)
- Elevation: 733 m (2,405 ft)

Population (2018-01-01)
  - Total: 1,042
  - Density: 23.8/km^{2} (61.8/sq mi)
- Time zone: UTC+1 (CET)
  - Summer (DST): UTC+2 (CEST)
- Postal code: 4272
- Area code: 07952
- Vehicle registration: FR
- Website: www.weitersfelden.at

Weitersfelden is a municipality (German: Marktgemeinde) in the district of Freistadt in the Mühlviertel in the Austrian state of Upper Austria.

== Districts ==
Districts (German: Ortsteile) of Weitersfelden includes:

- Eipoldschlag
- Haid
- Harrachstal (Harrachsthal)
- Knaußer
- Markersdorf
- Nadelbach
- Rabenberg
- Reitern
- Ritzenedt
- Saghammer
- Straßreit
- Stumberg
- Waldfeld
- Weitersfelden
- Wienau
- Windgföll

== Neighbouring municipalities ==
Sandl	Sandl	Liebenau
St. Oswald		Liebenau
St. Leonhard		Kaltenberg

== Population ==
Bevölkerungsentwicklung
Jahr	Einwohner	Jahr	Einwohner
1869	1.484	1951	1.350
1880	1.518	1961	1.368
1890	1.558	1971	1.374
1900	1.446	1981	1.284
1910	1.376	1991	1.201
1923	1.386	2001	1.137
1934	1.490	2008	1.084
1939	1.368		

== Politics ==
Partei / politische Gruppierung	Stimmenanteil	Veränderung	Sitze im Gemeinderat	Veränderung
ÖVP	68,6 %	-7.3%	13	-2
SPÖ	31,4 %	+7.3%	6	+2
Sonstige	0 %	0%	0	0
