= Mühlviertler Schnellstraße =

Expressway in Austria

Expressway S10
- Braunauer Schnellstraße S10
- Mühlviertler Schnellstraße

Route information
- Part of E55
- Length: 22 km (14 mi) Planned: 16 km (9.9 mi)

Major junctions
- From: A7 near Unterweitersdorf
- To: D3 border with the Czech Republic

Location
- Country: Austria
- Regions: Upper Austria
- Major cities: Freistadt

Highway system
- Highways of Austria; Autobahns; Expressways; State Roads

The Mühlviertler Schnellstraße (S10) is an expressway (Schnellstraße) in the Austrian state of Upper Austria, scheduled to run from the Mühlkreis Autobahn (A7) at Unterweitersdorf to the Austrian–Czech border at Wullowitz near Leopoldschlag. It is part of the European route E55.

== Course ==
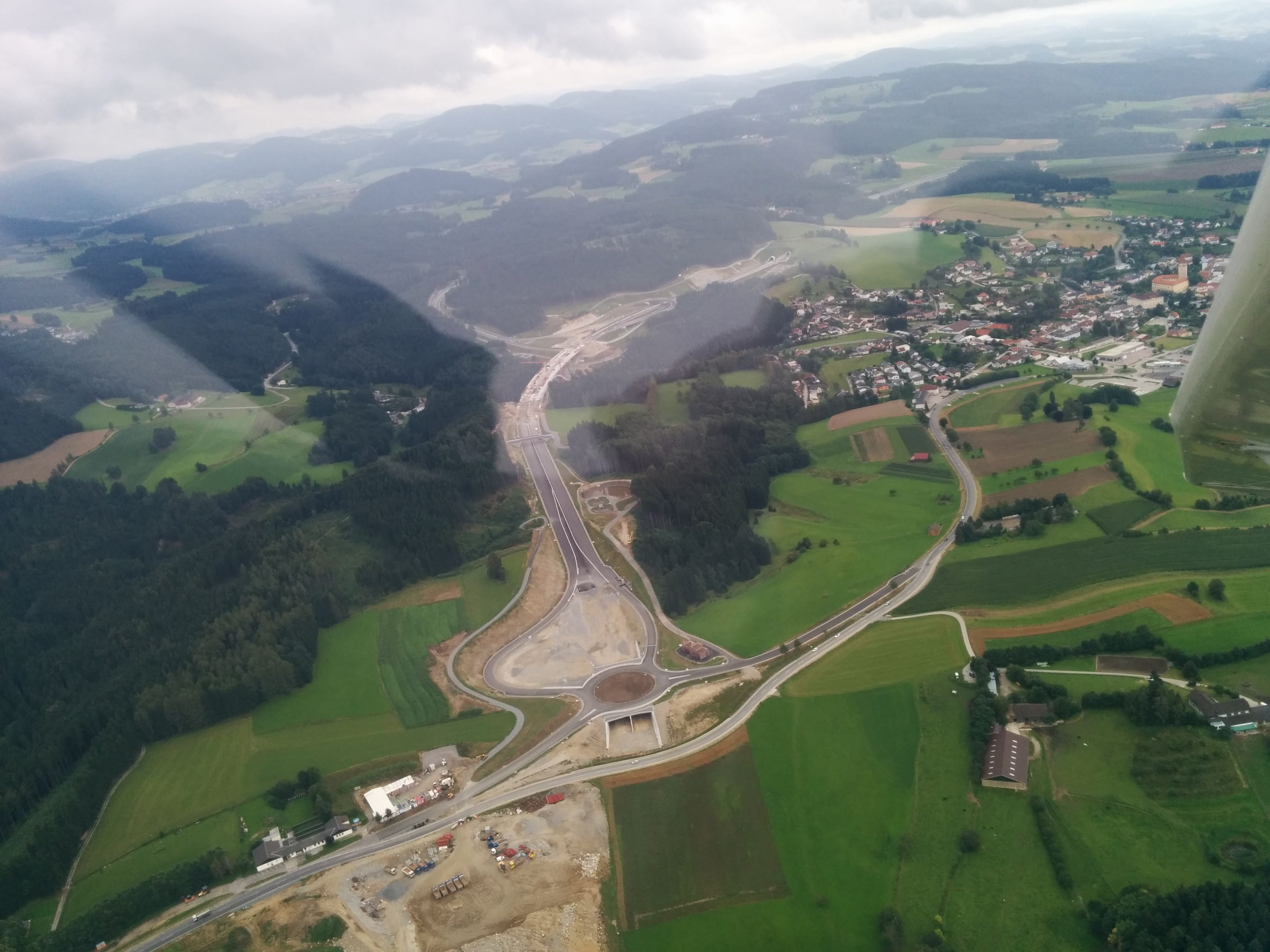
Current end near Freistadt, 2014

Plans developed in the 1970s to continue the Mühlkreis Autobahn to Neumarkt and Rainbach were abandoned in 1983. Nevertheless, after the Revolutions of 1989 and the Fall of the Iron Curtain, the transport route from Linz to Prague gained a new significance. When the Czech government announced the construction of the D3 motorway to the border with Austria in 1993, plans for an expressway through the Mühlviertel region were resumed.

Construction started in 2009, and a first 2.5 km (1.6 mi) long section near Unterweitersdorf was opened in 2012. A 1,970-metre (6,460 ft) long tunnel near Neumarkt was already in operation. As of December 2015, a 22-kilometre (14 mi) part from Unterweitersdorf to Freistadt is open to traffic. Construction work on some of the remaining section from Freistadt to the Czech border has taken place in the 2020s.
