= Austrian Centre of Industrial Biotechnology =

Research institute in Austria

Coordinates: 47°3′54″N 15°27′10″E

acib GmbH, Austrian Centre of Industrial Biotechnology
- Company type: Gesellschaft mit beschränkter Haftung
- Industry: Applied research, R & D
- Founded: 2010
- Headquarters: Graz, Austria
- Key people: Mathias Drexler (CEO), Bernd Nidetzky (CSO)
- Owner: Graz University of Technology, University of Natural Resources and Life Sciences, Vienna, University of Graz, Joanneum Research
- Number of employees: 200 (December 2023)
- Website: https://www.acib.at/

The Austrian Centre of Industrial Biotechnology (ACIB) is an international research institution for industrial biotechnology. Research facilities are located in Graz, Linz, Innsbruck, Tulln and Vienna. The administrative headquarters are located in Graz.

== History ==
ACIB was founded in 2010 and is a COMET Centre (K2) in the funding program COMET – Competence Centers for Excellent Technologies. It was preceded by the Research Centre Applied Biocatalysis in Graz and the Austrian Center of Biopharmaceutical Technology in Vienna. Owners of acib are the University of Graz, the Graz University of Technology, the University of Natural Resources and Applied Life Sciences, Vienna and Joanneum Research. The K2 center is funded within the COMET program by the BMAW, BMK as well as the federal states of Styria, Vienna, Lower Austria and Tyrol. The COMET program is managed by the FFG.

== Research ==
ACIB is developing more environmentally friendly and economic processes for the biotechnological, pharmaceutical and chemical industries. All these processes are modelled on methods and tools from nature.

Research areas include biocatalysis and chemical analytics, enzyme technologies and protein engineering, microbial biotechnology, cell line development and epigenetic, bioinformatic and simulations, bioprocess technologies as well as bioeconomy and environmental biotechnology.
