= Mühlkreis Autobahn =

Motorway in Austria

Motorway A7
- Mühlkreis Autobahn A7

Route information
- Length: 27 km (17 mi)

Major junctions
- From: A1 at Ansfelden
- To: S10 near Unterweitersdorf

Location
- Country: Austria
- Regions: Upper Austria
- Major cities: Linz

Highway system
- Highways of Austria; Autobahns; Expressways; State Roads
← A 6	→ A 8

The Mühlkreis Autobahn (A7) is an Autobahn (motorway) in the Austrian state of Upper Austria. It runs 27 km (17 mi) from the West Autobahn and the city of Linz to the Mühlviertel in the north, where it ends near the small municipality of Unterweitersdorf.

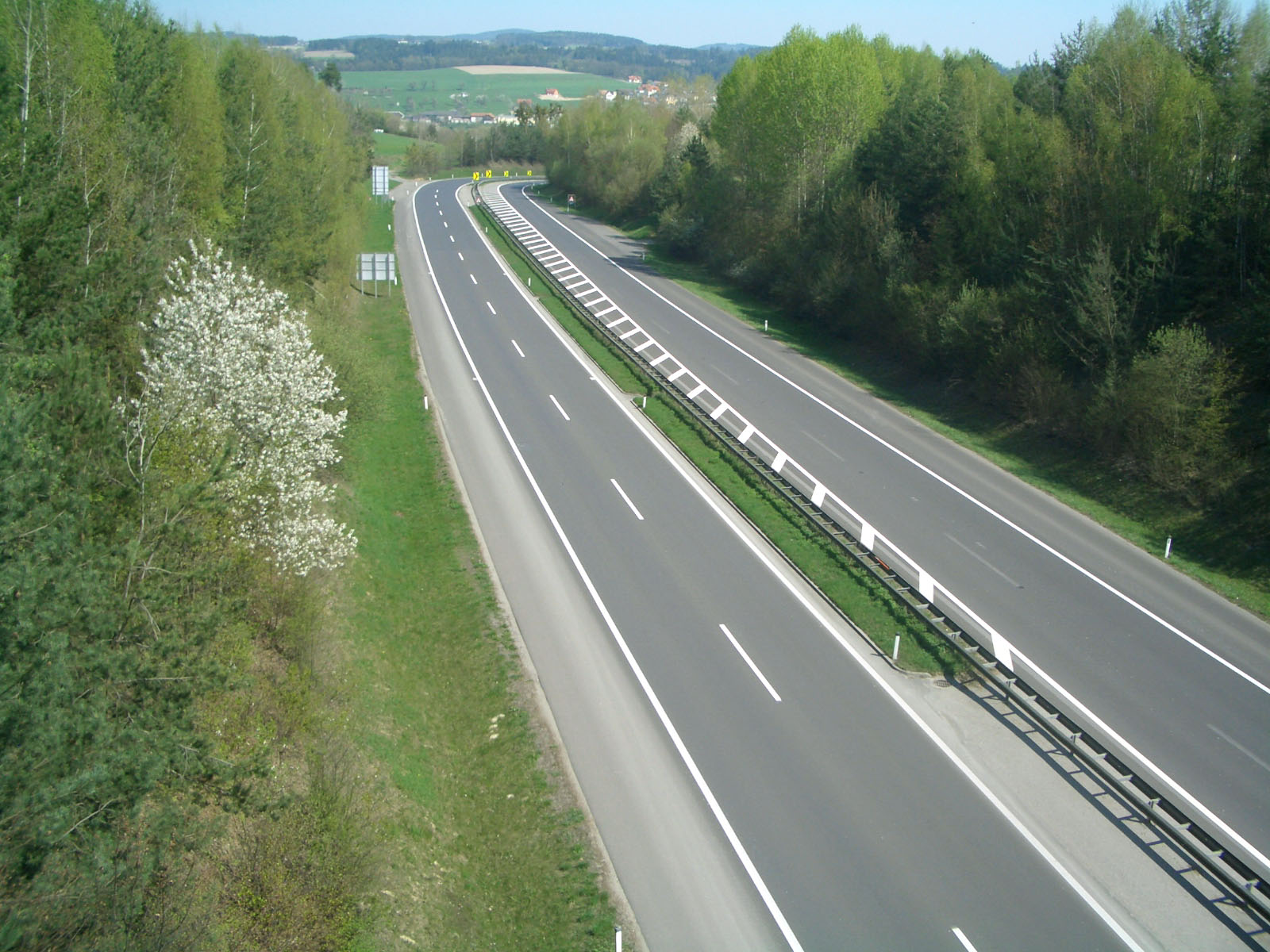
End of Mühlkreis Autobahn

Construction started in the early 1960s, however the plans of a motorway connecting Linz with České Budějovice in Czechoslovakia were never carried out and in 1982 the extension finally discontinued. Due to the increasing traffic volume after the fall of the Iron Curtain, a continuation will be provided by the Mühlviertler Schnellstraße expressway to Leopoldschlag at the Czech border, currently under construction.

== See also ==
- Autobahns of Austria
