= Joanneum =

Joanneum so named after Habsburg Archduke Johann of Austria may refer to:

== Museum ==
- Universalmuseum Joanneum

== University of applied sciences ==
- FH Joanneum

== Non-academic research institute ==
- Joanneum Research
