= Lasberg =

- Municipality
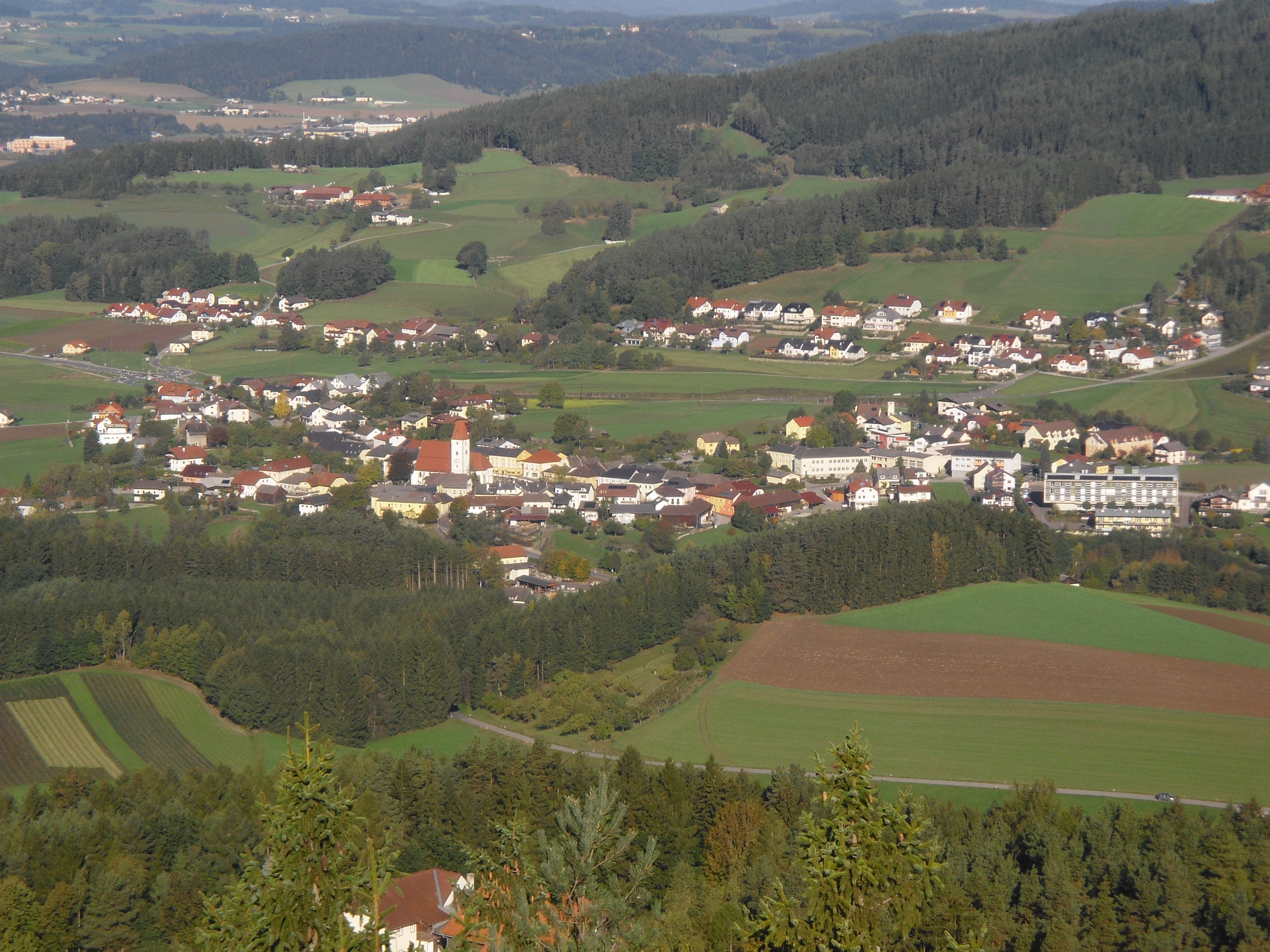

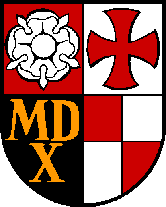
- Coat of arms

- Location within Austria
- Coordinates: 48°28′20″N 14°32′30″E
- Country: Austria
- State: Upper Austria
- District: Freistadt

Government
  - Mayor: Roman Brungraber (ÖVP)

Area
  - Total: 43.8 km^{2} (16.9 sq mi)
- Elevation: 574 m (1,883 ft)

Population (2018-01-01)
  - Total: 2,748
  - Density: 62.7/km^{2} (162/sq mi)
- Time zone: UTC+1 (CET)
  - Summer (DST): UTC+2 (CEST)
- Postal code: 4291
- Area code: 07947
- Vehicle registration: FR
- Website: www.lasberg.ooe.gv.at

Lasberg is a municipality in the district of Freistadt, located in Upper Austria. In 2021, it had a population of 2,832 inhabitants.

== Population ==
Historical population
Year	Pop.	±%
1869	1,891	—
1880	1,882	−0.5%
1890	1,922	+2.1%
1900	1,962	+2.1%
1910	1,988	+1.3%
1923	2,027	+2.0%
1934	2,039	+0.6%
1939	1,968	−3.5%
1951	2,100	+6.7%
1961	2,190	+4.3%
1971	2,270	+3.7%
1981	2,499	+10.1%
1991	2,717	+8.7%
2001	2,743	+1.0%
2011	2,795	+1.9%
2021	2,832	+1.3%
