= Königswiesen =

Municipality in Upper Austria

- Municipality
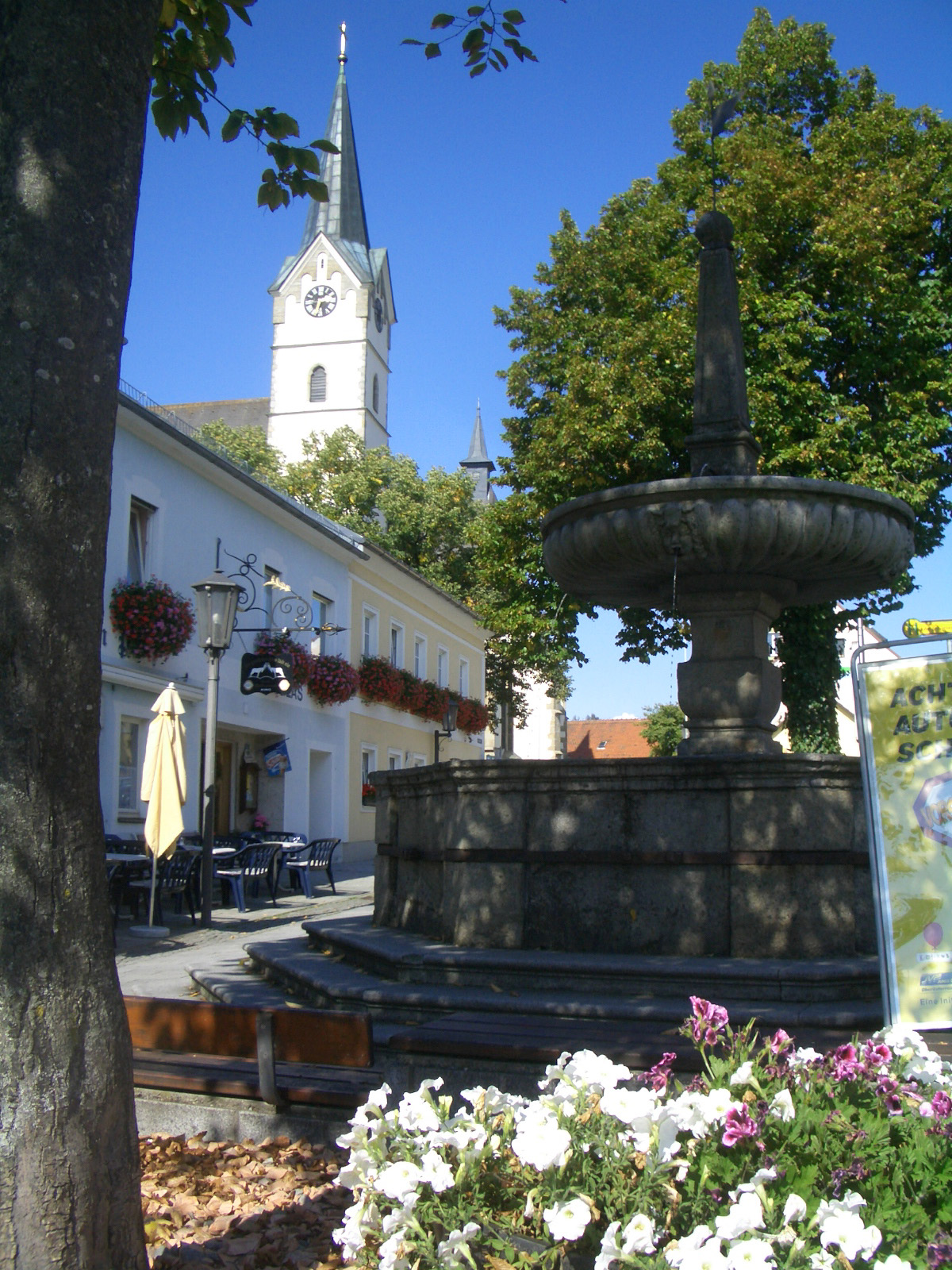

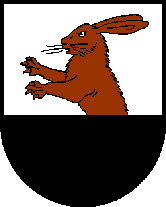
- Coat of arms

- Location within Austria
- Coordinates: 48°24′28″N 14°50′29″E
- Country: Austria
- State: Upper Austria
- District: Freistadt

Government
  - Mayor: Johann Holzmann (ÖVP)

Area
  - Total: 73.41 km^{2} (28.34 sq mi)
- Elevation: 614 m (2,014 ft)

Population (2018-01-01)
  - Total: 3,113
  - Density: 42.41/km^{2} (109.8/sq mi)
- Time zone: UTC+1 (CET)
  - Summer (DST): UTC+2 (CEST)
- Postal code: 4280
- Area code: 07955
- Vehicle registration: FR
- Website: www.riskommunal.at/koenigswiesen/

Königswiesen is a municipality in the district of Freistadt in the Austrian state of Upper Austria.

== Population ==
Historical population
Year	Pop.	±%
1869	2,663	—
1880	2,756	+3.5%
1890	2,692	−2.3%
1900	2,783	+3.4%
1910	2,771	−0.4%
1923	2,707	−2.3%
1934	2,727	+0.7%
1939	2,703	−0.9%
1951	2,717	+0.5%
1961	2,707	−0.4%
1971	2,921	+7.9%
1981	3,057	+4.7%
1991	3,090	+1.1%
2001	3,123	+1.1%
