= Unterweißenbach =

Place in Austria

- Municipality
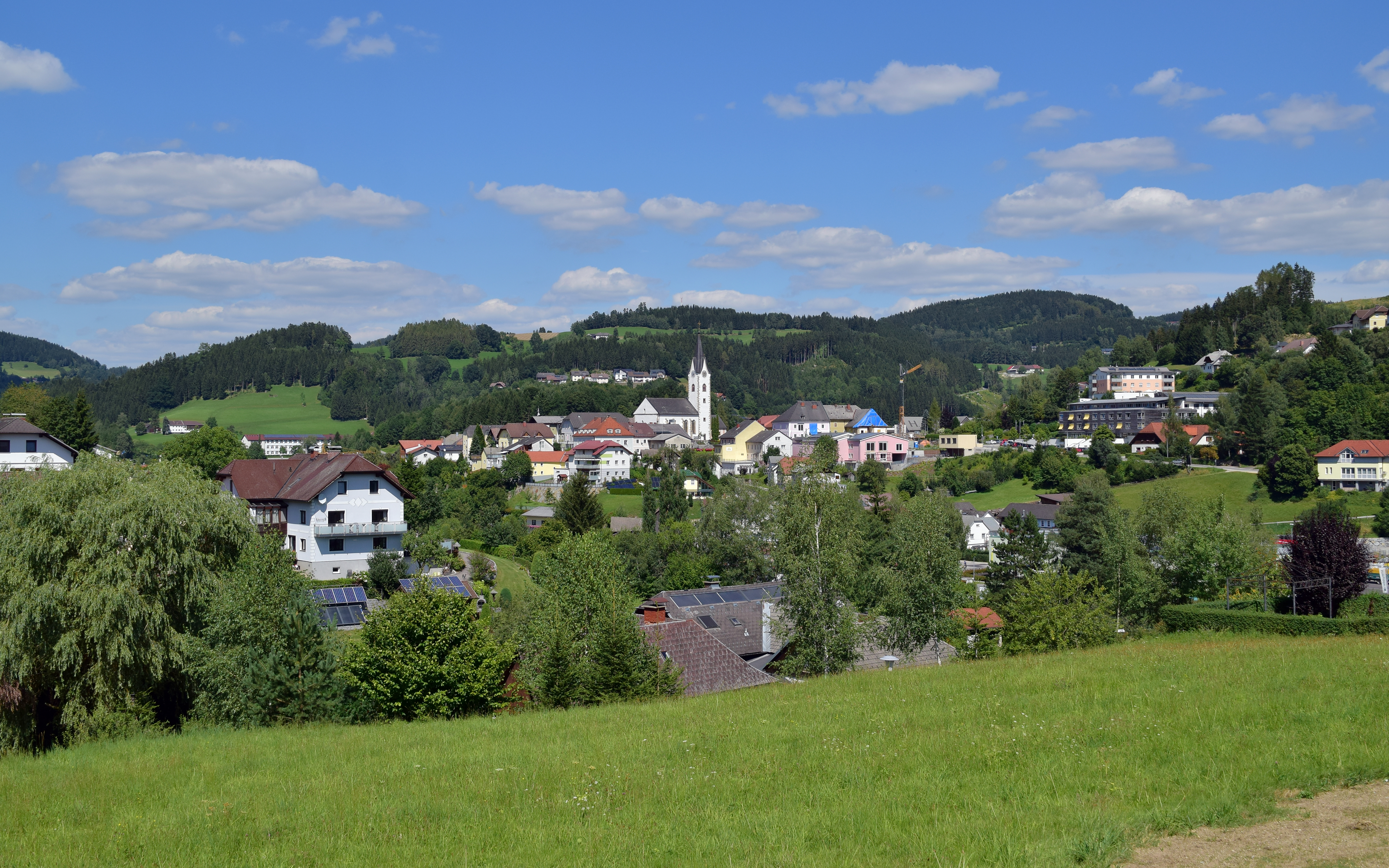

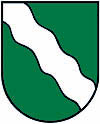
- Coat of arms

- Location within Austria
- Coordinates: 48°26′10″N 14°46′55″E
- Country: Austria
- State: Upper Austria
- District: Freistadt

Government
  - Mayor: Johannes Hinterreither-Kern (ÖVP)

Area
  - Total: 48.69 km^{2} (18.80 sq mi)
- Elevation: 640 m (2,100 ft)

Population (2018-01-01)
  - Total: 2,192
  - Density: 45.02/km^{2} (116.6/sq mi)
- Time zone: UTC+1 (CET)
  - Summer (DST): UTC+2 (CEST)
- Postal code: 4273
- Area code: 07956
- Vehicle registration: FR
- Website: www.unterweissenbach.at

Unterweißenbach is a municipality in the district of Freistadt in the Austrian state of Upper Austria.

== Population ==
Historical population
Year	Pop.	±%
1869	2,147	—
1880	2,132	−0.7%
1890	2,238	+5.0%
1900	2,115	−5.5%
1910	2,127	+0.6%
1923	2,160	+1.6%
1934	2,264	+4.8%
1939	2,283	+0.8%
1951	2,181	−4.5%
1961	2,285	+4.8%
1971	2,474	+8.3%
1981	2,501	+1.1%
1991	2,465	−1.4%
2001	2,299	−6.7%
