= Softwarepark Hagenberg =

General information
- Type: Technology park
- Location: Hagenberg im Mühlkreis, Upper Austria, Austria
- Coordinates: 48.36964°N 14.512807°E
- Construction started: 1989
- Owner: Province of Upper Austria

Website
- www.softwarepark-hagenberg.com

The Softwarepark Hagenberg is the Austrian technology park for software, located in Hagenberg im Mühlkreis, Austria, founded in 1989 by Professor Bruno Buchberger. The Softwarepark Hagenberg is a unique collaboration where research, business and education are intensively cooperating. Because of its success, the park has been called the "Wunder von Hagenberg" (miracle of Hagenberg).

== History ==
Buchberger devised the concept for the park in 1989. It was created to balance both economic needs and desire for research and as such, the concept focused one third on economic production, one third on research and one third on academic education in the field of IT and related sciences. These three components drive a synergetic "spirale of innovation". Softwarepark has four main partners: The Province of Upper Austria, the Johannes Kepler University Linz, the Community of Hagenberg, and Raiffeisen Landesbank Oberösterreich, a major local bank. The first institute to be established in the park was Buchberger's Research Institute for Symbolic Computation (RISC) with then 25 students and employees.

Today Softwarepark is increasing its international activities, e.g. with ISI - International Studies in Informatics Hagenberg or the recently launched International Incubator Hagenberg.

Within the twenty years of its existence, 100 million € were invested into developing the park.

== Composition ==
The park currently houses 50 companies with more than 1000 employees as well as more than 1400 students of a number of universities and colleges, amongst them the Research Institute for Symbolic Computation, and the Software Competence Center Hagenberg SCCH funded by the Austrian COMET program.

Additionally, the park houses a social project for people with disabilities to provide computer support in cooperation with the Diakonisches Werk Gallneukirchen and the Fachhochschule Hagenberg.

== Expansion ==
The current expansion schedule plans to expand the park with 20 million € in funds until 2012, with the expansion of the Research Institute for Symbolic Computation as well as a hotel, sport arenas and an international student union building. An additional 50 million € are planned to be invested until 2014 for the expansion of the companies and research institutes in the park.

== Books ==
- Buchberger, Bruno; et al., eds. (1 July 2009). Hagenberg Research. Springer Verlag. ISBN 978-3-642-02126-8.
