= Hirschbach im Mühlkreis =

- Municipality
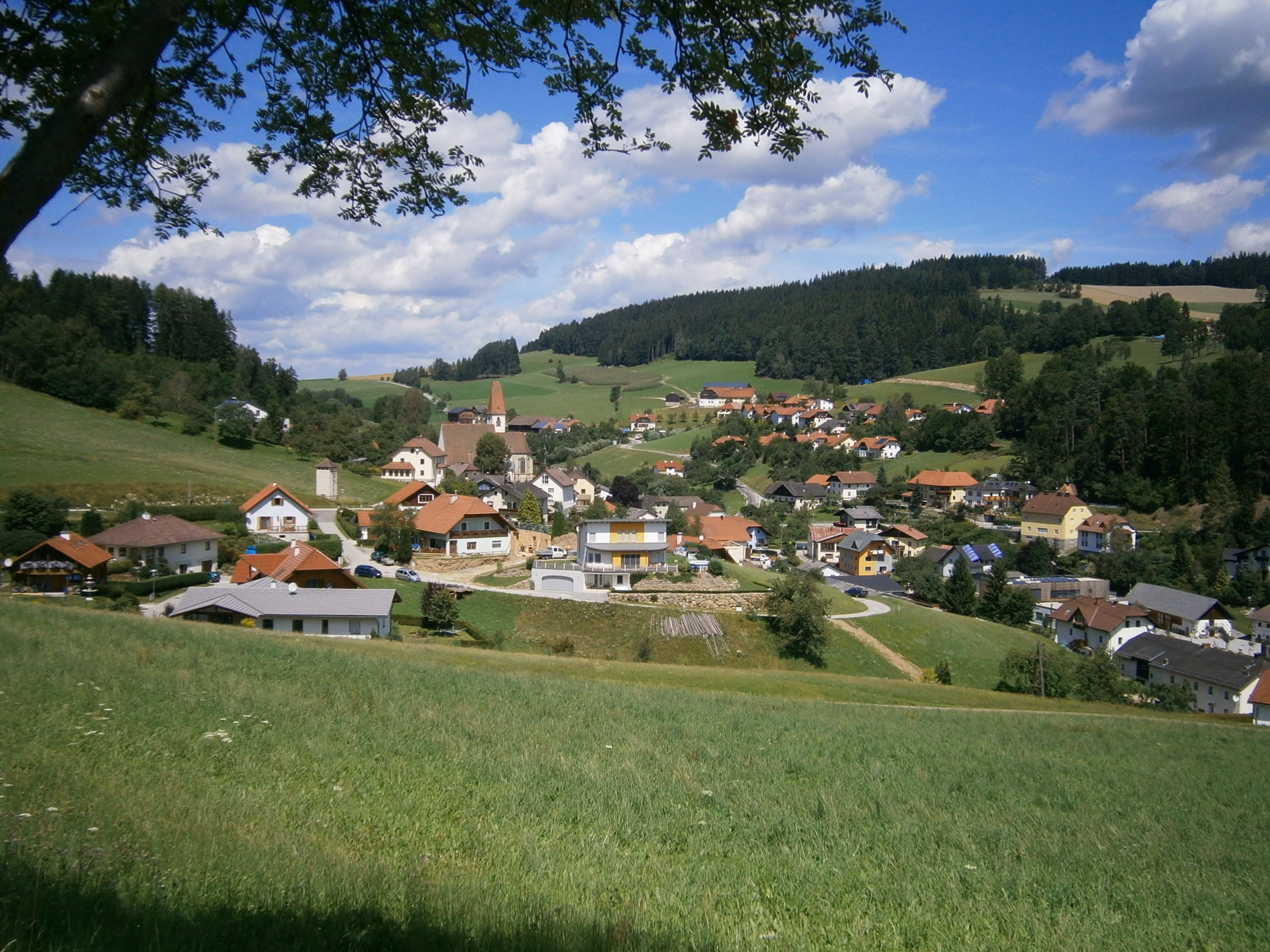

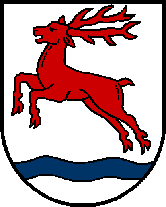
- Coat of arms

- Location within Austria
- Coordinates: 48°29′19″N 14°24′44″E
- Country: Austria
- State: Upper Austria
- District: Freistadt

Government
  - Mayor: Stefan Wiesinger (ÖVP)

Area
  - Total: 23.67 km^{2} (9.14 sq mi)
- Elevation: 640 m (2,100 ft)

Population (2018-01-01)
  - Total: 1,194
  - Density: 50.44/km^{2} (130.6/sq mi)
- Time zone: UTC+1 (CET)
  - Summer (DST): UTC+2 (CEST)
- Postal code: 4242
- Area code: 07948
- Vehicle registration: FR
- Website: www.hirschbach.at

Hirschbach im Mühlkreis is a municipality in the district of Freistadt in the Austrian state of Upper Austria.

== Population ==
Historical population
Year	Pop.	±%
1869	1,146	—
1880	1,119	−2.4%
1890	1,079	−3.6%
1900	1,085	+0.6%
1910	1,190	+9.7%
1923	1,188	−0.2%
1934	1,110	−6.6%
1939	1,056	−4.9%
1951	1,092	+3.4%
1961	1,163	+6.5%
1971	1,186	+2.0%
1981	1,152	−2.9%
1991	1,162	+0.9%
2001	1,186	+2.1%
