= Austrian Space Agency =

National space agency of Austria

- Agentur für Luft- und Raumfahrt

Agency overview
- Abbreviation: ALR
- Formed: 1972
- Type: Space agency
- Headquarters: Wien 9, Sensengasse 1, Vienna, Austria
- Official languages: German; English
- Owner: Austrian Research Promotion Agency (Austrian Government)
- Website: www.ffg.at → ALR

The Austrian Space Agency, officially known since 2005 as the Aeronautics and Space Agency (German: Agentur für Luft- und Raumfahrt), is an organization whose purpose is to coordinate Austrian space exploration-related activities. It has been involved in both national programmes and multinational efforts coordinated via the European Space Agency (ESA).

The Austrian Space Agency was established in 1972, its headquarters is located in Vienna. On 1 January 1987, Austria became a member state of the ESA. The agency is notable for coordinating the first space flight of an Austrian, that of engineer Franz Viehböck with a Soviet Soyuz spacecraft, during 1990.

== History ==
=== Background ===
Prior to the formation of the Austrian Space Agency, Austria had been actively involved in space activities. During the late 1950s and 1960s, the nation opted to increasingly involve itself in numerous international space-orientated committees, typically via the United Nations. Austrian delegates coordinated with international counterparts to formulate numerous early treaties and establish laws related to the use of space. The Austrian government also developed an interest in promoting space-based activities, particularly its domestic efforts. During early 1961, the nation was involved in talks towards founding the European Space Research Organisation (ESRO); upon its founding three years later, Austria opted for observer status. This was reportedly due to a lack of an agreement on the nation's financial contributions.

The Austrian government did not involve itself in the European Launcher Development Organisation (ELDO) initiative; this is primarily due to it being a violation of the Austrian State Treaty. While the nation was not a full member of the ESRO, several figures within Austria were keen to pursue a more active role in space activities. In May 1962, the Austrian Astronautical Society was established to launch scale model rockets with a vision towards future programmes. Between 1967 and 1972, the society represented Austria at the International Astronautical Federation, ceasing in this role following its replacement by the Austrian Space Agency. The formation of the Austrian Space Agency had been first proposed in 1962. In May 1968, the Austrian Federal Ministry for Foreign Affairs established a committee to investigate the possibility. Following the establishment of the Federal Ministry for Science and Research in 1970, a task force to realise the envisioned agency was put together. During 1972, the Austrian Space Agency was established.

=== Active years ===
The Austrian Space Agency's stated long-term goal has been to strengthen the international standing of Austrian industry, business and science in space-based technologies to achieve economic and technological development, as well as to look after the growth of the Austrian aerospace sector. One function of the agency is the implementation of national aerospace policy, as well as to represent Austria on various international aerospace committees.

During 1975, Austria began actively participating in the European Space Agency (ESA), the successor to the ESRO. During 1981, Austria was recognised as an associate member of the ESA. On 1 January 1987, the country formally became a full member of the ESA. Austria's involvement with the ESA activities extended beyond mandatory activities, such as space science, technology, and study programmes, into various optional programmes, including Earth observation and microgravity research, space infrastructure and scientific experiment development, along with space navigation and telecommunications projects.

Austria has pursued bilateral cooperative projects with various international partners. During 1989, Austria came to an agreement with the Soviet Union for a common Austrian-Soviet spaceflight; this led to engineer Franz Viehböck becoming the first Austrian citizen to experience space flight, having conducted a mission on board a Soyuz spacecraft to the Mir space station during the following year. Other Austrian-Soviet cooperative efforts resulted in Austria developing numerous scientific instruments for probes, leading to its involvement in a range of missions. Other nations that Austria has conducted bilateral projects with include Norway, Sweden, France, Switzerland, and Germany.

== See also ==
- List of government space agencies
- Austrian Research Promotion Agency
