= VRVis =

Austrian research center

VRVis GmbH
- Type: Nonprofit organization
- Founded: 2000
- Founder: TU Wien
- Headquarters: Vienna, Austria
- Key people: Gerd Hesina (CEO), Katja Bühler (scientific director)
- Services: Applied research, development and consulting in visual computing (computer science)
- Revenue: c. €7.9 million (2023)
- Website: www.vrvis.at

VRVis (Vienna Research Center for Visual Computing) is Austria's largest research center in the area of visual computing. It is one of currently 24 centrally funded COMET – Competence Centers for Excellent Technologies of Austria. The VRVis Center is located in Ares Tower in Vienna.
