= Pierbach =

- Municipality
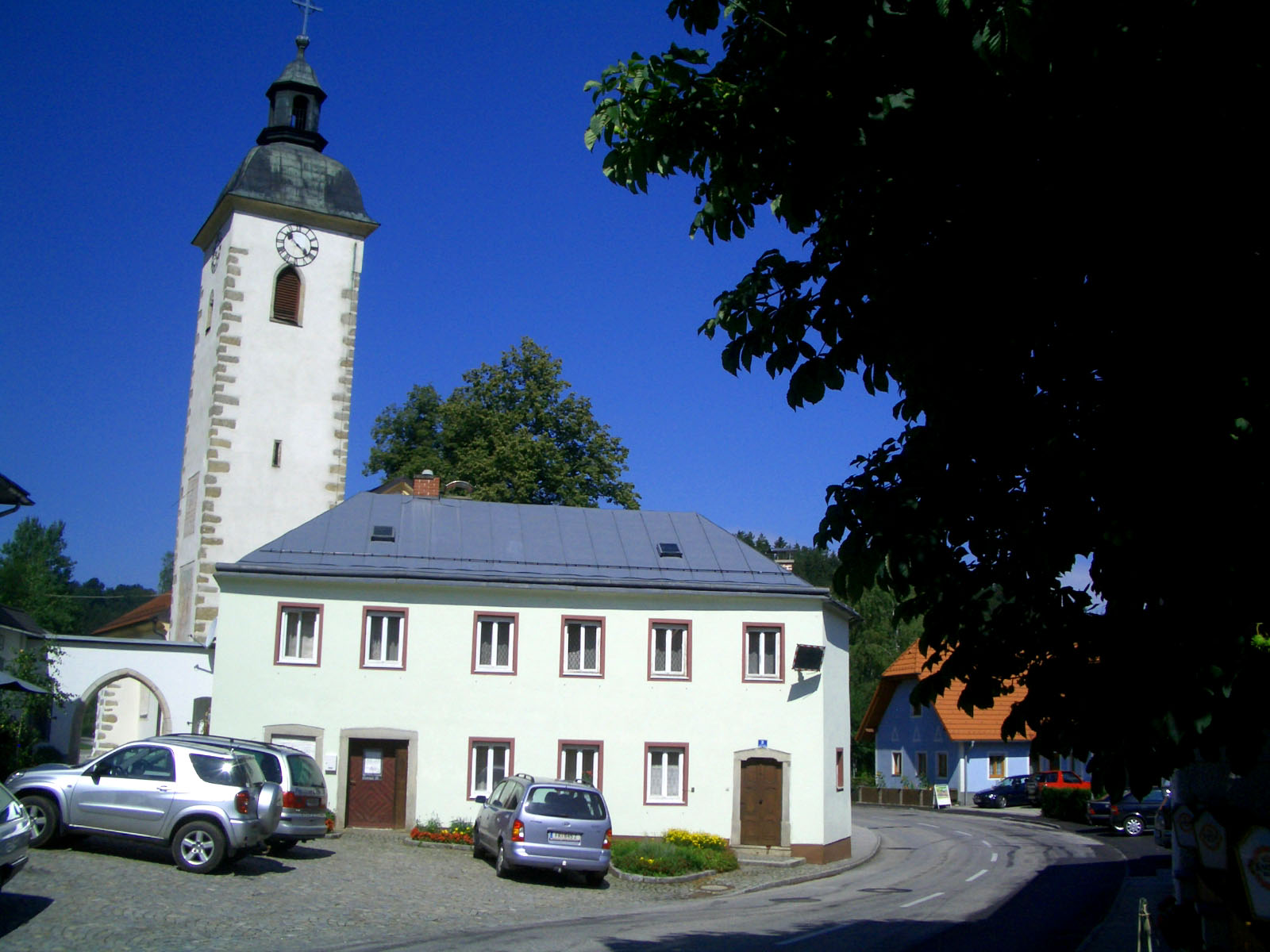

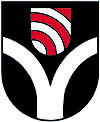
- Coat of arms

- Location within Austria
- Coordinates: 48°20′50″N 14°45′20″E
- Country: Austria
- State: Upper Austria
- District: Freistadt

Government
  - Mayor: Isidor Bauernfeind (ÖVP)

Area
  - Total: 22.7 km^{2} (8.8 sq mi)
- Elevation: 494 m (1,621 ft)

Population (2018-01-01)
  - Total: 1,011
  - Density: 44.5/km^{2} (115/sq mi)
- Time zone: UTC+1 (CET)
  - Summer (DST): UTC+2 (CEST)
- Postal code: 4282
- Area code: 07267
- Vehicle registration: FR
- Website: www.pierbach.at

Pierbach is a municipality in the district of Freistadt in the Austrian state of Upper Austria.

== Geography ==
Pierbach lies in the Mühlviertel. About 10 percent of the municipality is forest and 12 percent farmland.
