= Competence Centers for Excellent Technologies =

COMET – Competence Centers for Excellent Technologies is a central funding program of the Austrian technology politics. It serves to create competence centers for various topics at selected locations.

== Basic strategy ==
The COMET program stimulates academic scientists and industrial researchers and developers to work together on strategic and translational research projects, closer to industry than university groups would typically work on, however concentrating on prototype research and not on products ready for the market.

== History ==
Predecessors of the COMET program were the K_plus and K_ind programs of the Austrian government that started in 1998.

In 2006 the program was restructured and put in the hands of the Austrian Research Promotion Agency FFG under the new name COMET. At that time there were 18 competence centers active, with 270 scientific partners and 150 industry partners.

In 2012 there were more than 40 competence centers in operation, five of them in the largest class K2, 16 in the medium class K1, and - after the 4th call - 36 funded K-projects. A total of 1500 researchers were working in these projects in 2013.

== Financing ==
The centers receive about 50% of their budget from the funding, and the other 50% have to be acquired from companies. 5% are expected as in-kind contributions from the scientific partners.

== Current competence centers ==
The difference between K2, K1 and K is in size, budget, funding duration and international cooperation.

=== K2 Centers ===
K2 centers receive a funding for 10 years.

- ACCM – Austrian Center of Competence of Mechatronics, OÖ
- K2-Mobility – K2-Mobility SVT sustainable vehicle technologies, STMK
- MPPE – Integrated Research in Materials, Processing and Product Engineering, STMK
- ACIB – Austrian Center of Industrial Biotechnology, STMK
- XTribology Excellence Center of Tribology, NÖ

=== K1 Centers ===
K1 centers receive a funding for 7 years.

- Pro2Future - Products and Production Systems of the Future, NÖ + STMK
- Bioenergy 2020+, STMK
- RCPE – Research Center for Pharmaceutical Engineering, STMK
- CEST – Centre of Excellence in Electrochemical Surface Technology and Materials, NÖ
- CTR – Competence Centre for Advanced Sensor Technologies (CTR Carinthian Tech Research AG) K
- evolaris – evolaris next level, STMK
- FTW – Competence Center for Information and Communication Technologies, W
- K1-MET – Competence Center for excellent Technologies in Advanced Metallurgical and Environmental Process Development, OÖ
- KNOW – Know-Center Graz – Kompetenzzentrum für wissensbasierte Anwendungen und Systeme GmbH, STMK
- ONCOTYROL – Center for Personalized Cancer Medicine, T
- SCCH – Software Competence Center Hagenberg, OÖ
- Wood COMET – Kompetenzzentrum für Holzverbundwerkstoffe und Holzchemie, OÖ
- ACMIT - Austrian Center for Medical Innovation and Technology, NÖ
- PCCL-K1 - Polymer Competence Center Leoben, Stmk
- SBA 2 - Secure Business Austria 2, Wien
- VRVis - Visualization, Rendering and Visual Analysis Research Center, Wien
- alpS - Centre for Climate Change Adaptation Technologies, Tirol

=== K Projects ===
K projects are large scientific projects that help prepare for a more prominent cooperation of the contributors in the future. They receive a funding for 3 to 5 years.
