= Hagenberg im Mühlkreis =

- Municipality
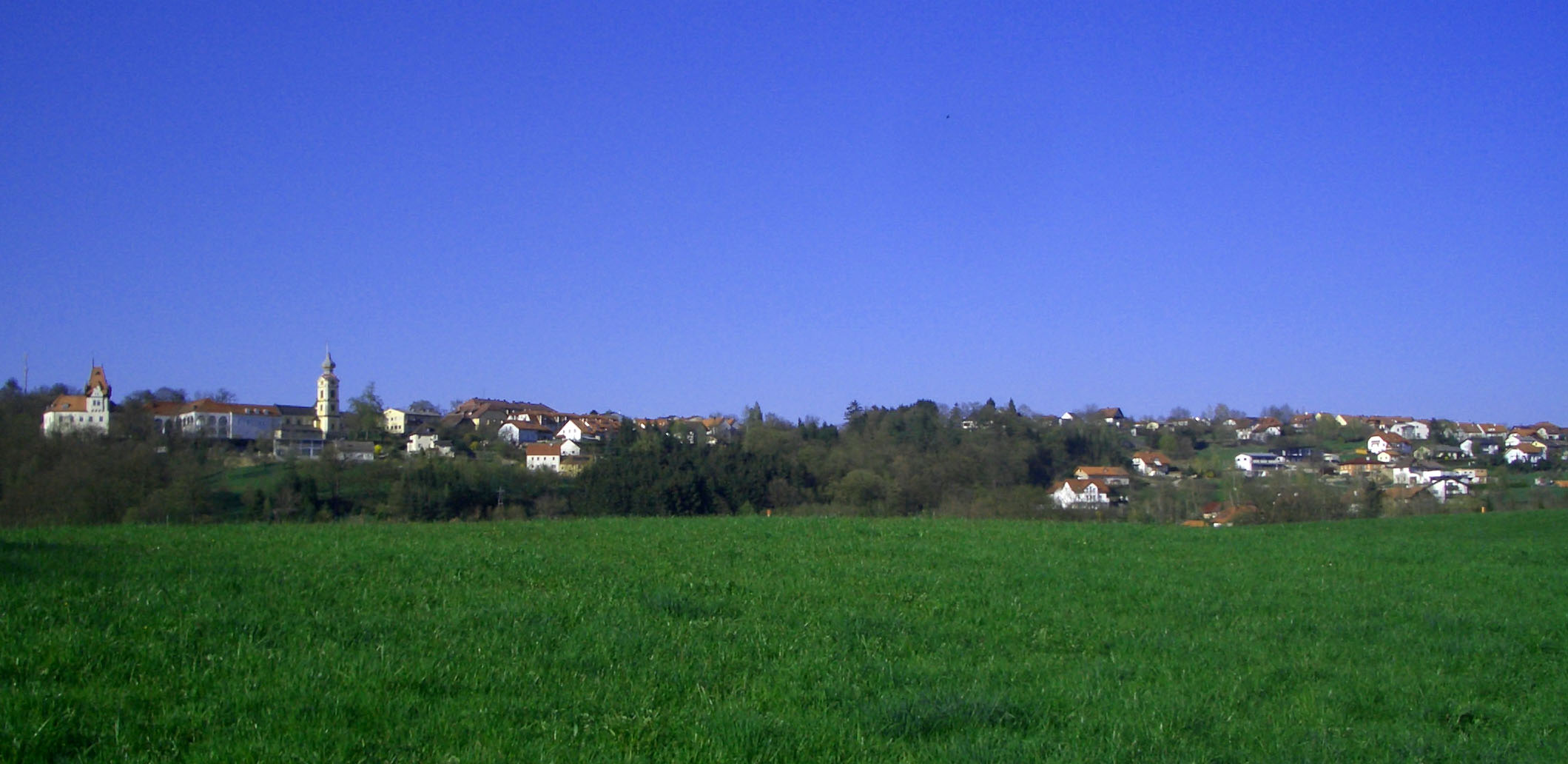

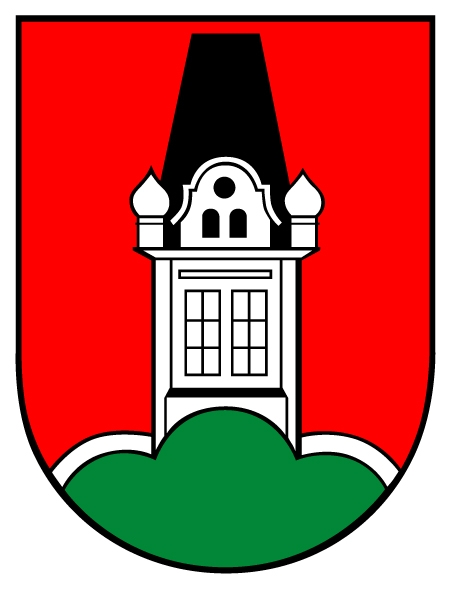
- Coat of arms

- Location within Austria
- Coordinates: 48°21′50″N 14°31′10″E
- Country: Austria
- State: Upper Austria
- District: Freistadt

Government
  - Mayor: David Bergsmann (ÖVP)

Area
  - Total: 15.06 km^{2} (5.81 sq mi)
- Elevation: 444 m (1,457 ft)

Population (2018-01-01)
  - Total: 2,737
  - Density: 181.7/km^{2} (470.7/sq mi)
- Time zone: UTC+1 (CET)
  - Summer (DST): UTC+2 (CEST)
- Postal code: 4232
- Area code: 07236
- Vehicle registration: FR
- Website: www.hagenberg. ooe.gv.at

Hagenberg im Mühlkreis is a town in the district of Freistadt in the Austrian state of Upper Austria 20 km from Linz. Hagenberg became known for Softwarepark Hagenberg a major technology park focusing on IT, with research, education and business.

== Population ==
Historical population
Year	Pop.	±%
1869	1,049	—
1880	1,038	−1.0%
1890	1,122	+8.1%
1900	1,162	+3.6%
1910	1,080	−7.1%
1923	994	−8.0%
1934	988	−0.6%
1939	1,009	+2.1%
1951	1,148	+13.8%
1961	1,183	+3.0%
1971	1,583	+33.8%
1981	1,764	+11.4%
1991	2,137	+21.1%
2001	2,513	+17.6%

== Research institutes in Hagenberg ==
- RISC
- FLLL
- Software Competence Center Hagenberg (SCCH)
- Institute for Application Oriented Knowledge Processing (FAW)
- FH OÖ Research & Development GmbH - Research Center Hagenberg
- Josef Ressel Zentrum - Heureka!
- Research Studio Austria NiCE
- Austrian Grid Development Center (AGEZ)

== Education ==
- Johannes Kepler Universität Linz has four institutes in Hagenberg: RISC, FAW, FLLL, GeoGebra
- University of Applied Sciences Upper Austria - School of Informatics, Communication and Media (Fachhochschule Hagenberg)
- ISI-Hagenberg - The International School for Informatics

== Business ==
More than 50 IT companies in the Softwarepark Hagenberg.

Sport facilities in Hagenberg include a soccer field, three volleyball fields, a bouldering hall and a fishing pond.
