= Freistadt District =

Coordinates: 48.444°N 14.564°E

Freistadt District Bezirk Freistadt
- District
- Country: Austria
- State: Upper Austria
- Number of municipalities: 27
- Administrative seat: Freistadt

Government
  - District Governor: Andrea Wildberger

Area
  - Total: 993.9 km^{2} (383.7 sq mi)

Population (2016-06-14)
  - Total: 65,853
  - Density: 66.26/km^{2} (171.6/sq mi)
- Time zone: UTC+01:00 (CET)
  - Summer (DST): UTC+02:00 (CEST)
- Vehicle registration: FR
- NUTS code: AT313

Bezirk Freistadt (Czech: okres Freistadt) is a district of the state of Upper Austria, in central northern Austria.

== Municipalities ==
Towns (Städte) are indicated in boldface; market towns (Marktgemeinden) in italics; suburbs, hamlets and other subdivisions of a municipality are indicated in small characters.

- Bad Zell
- **Freistadt**
- Grünbach
- Gutau
- Hagenberg im Mühlkreis
- Hirschbach im Mühlkreis
- Kaltenberg
- Kefermarkt
- Königswiesen
- Lasberg
- Leopoldschlag
- Liebenau
- Neumarkt im Mühlkreis
- Pierbach
- **Pregarten**
- Rainbach im Mühlkreis
- Sandl
- Schönau im Mühlkreis
- Sankt Leonhard bei Freistadt
- Sankt Oswald bei Freistadt
- Tragwein
- Unterweißenbach
- Unterweitersdorf
- Waldburg
- Wartberg ob der Aist
- Weitersfelden
- Windhaag bei Freistadt
