= Waldburg, Austria =

Waldburg
- Municipality
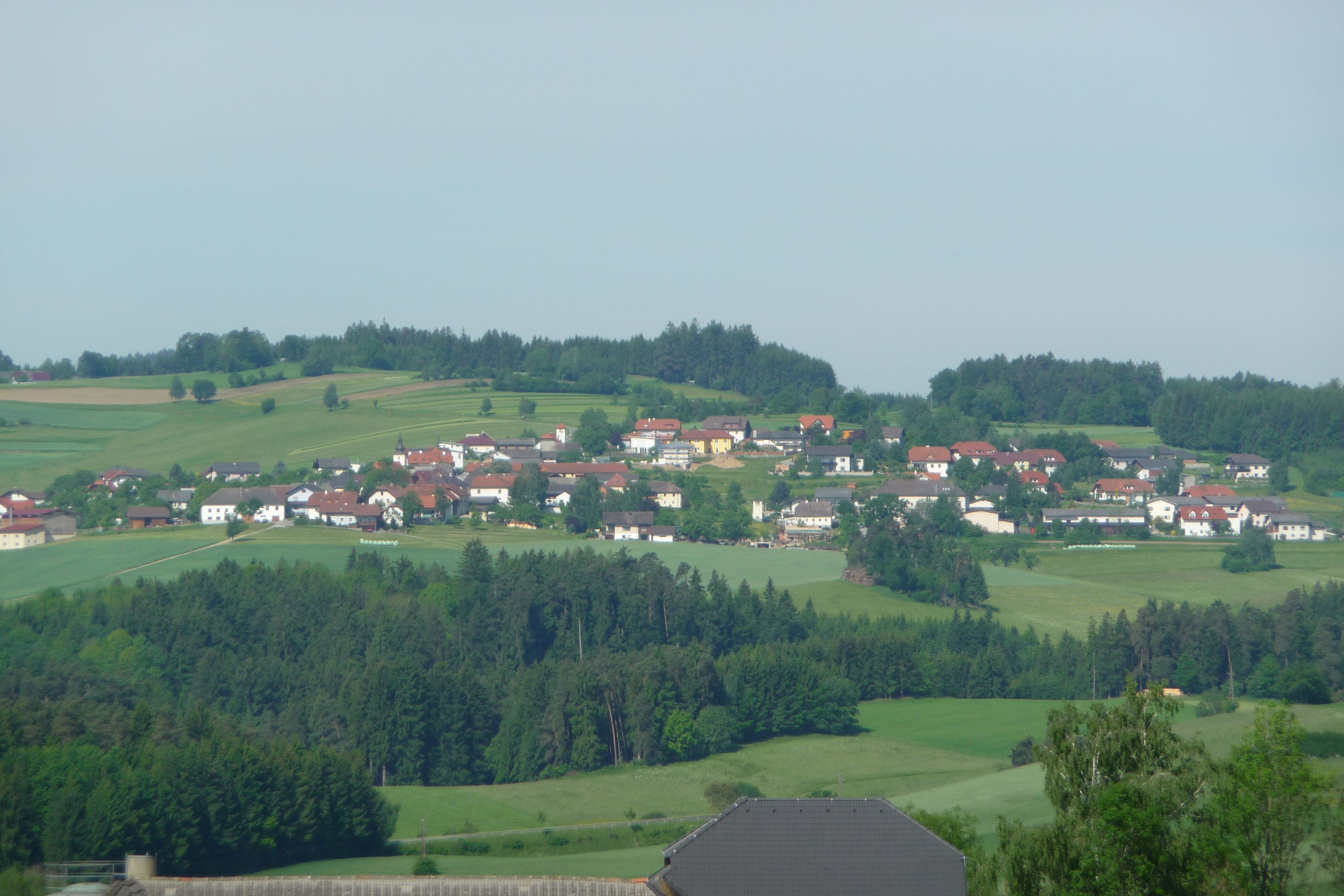

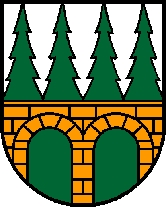
- Coat of arms

- Location within Austria
- Coordinates: 48°30′30″N 14°26′20″E
- Country: Austria
- State: Upper Austria
- District: Freistadt

Government
  - Mayor: Josef Eilmsteiner (ÖVP)

Area
  - Total: 26.58 km^{2} (10.26 sq mi)
- Elevation: 685 m (2,247 ft)

Population (2018-01-01)
  - Total: 1,375
  - Density: 51.73/km^{2} (134.0/sq mi)
- Time zone: UTC+1 (CET)
  - Summer (DST): UTC+2 (CEST)
- Postal code: 4240
- Area code: 07942
- Vehicle registration: FR
- Website: www.oberoesterreich. at/waldburg

Waldburg is a municipality in the district of Freistadt in the Austrian state of Upper Austria.

== Geography ==
Waldburg is lies in the Mühlviertel. The Jaunitz creek and the Kronbach creek flow through the Waldburg region. The "Sepp'n Höhe" is, at 780 m above sea level, Waldburg's highest point.

=== Subdivisions ===
- Freudenthal
- Harruck
- Lahrndorf
- Marreith
- Mitterreith
- Oberschwandt
- Prechtleinschlag
- Sankt Peter
- Schöndorf
- Unterschwandt
- Waldburg

== Sights ==
The parish church of Waldburg has three magnificent late-gothic winged altars. The High Altar is sacred to Mary Magdalene. The right Side Altar is sacred to Saint Wolfgang and the left Side Altar is sacred to Saint Catherine.

Museum Mini Agrimundus: Traditional miniatures from rural living.

== Twin towns ==
Waldburg ist twinned with Waldburg a town in the district of Ravensburg in Baden-Württemberg in Germany.
