= Bad Zell =

Municipality in Upper Austria

- Municipality
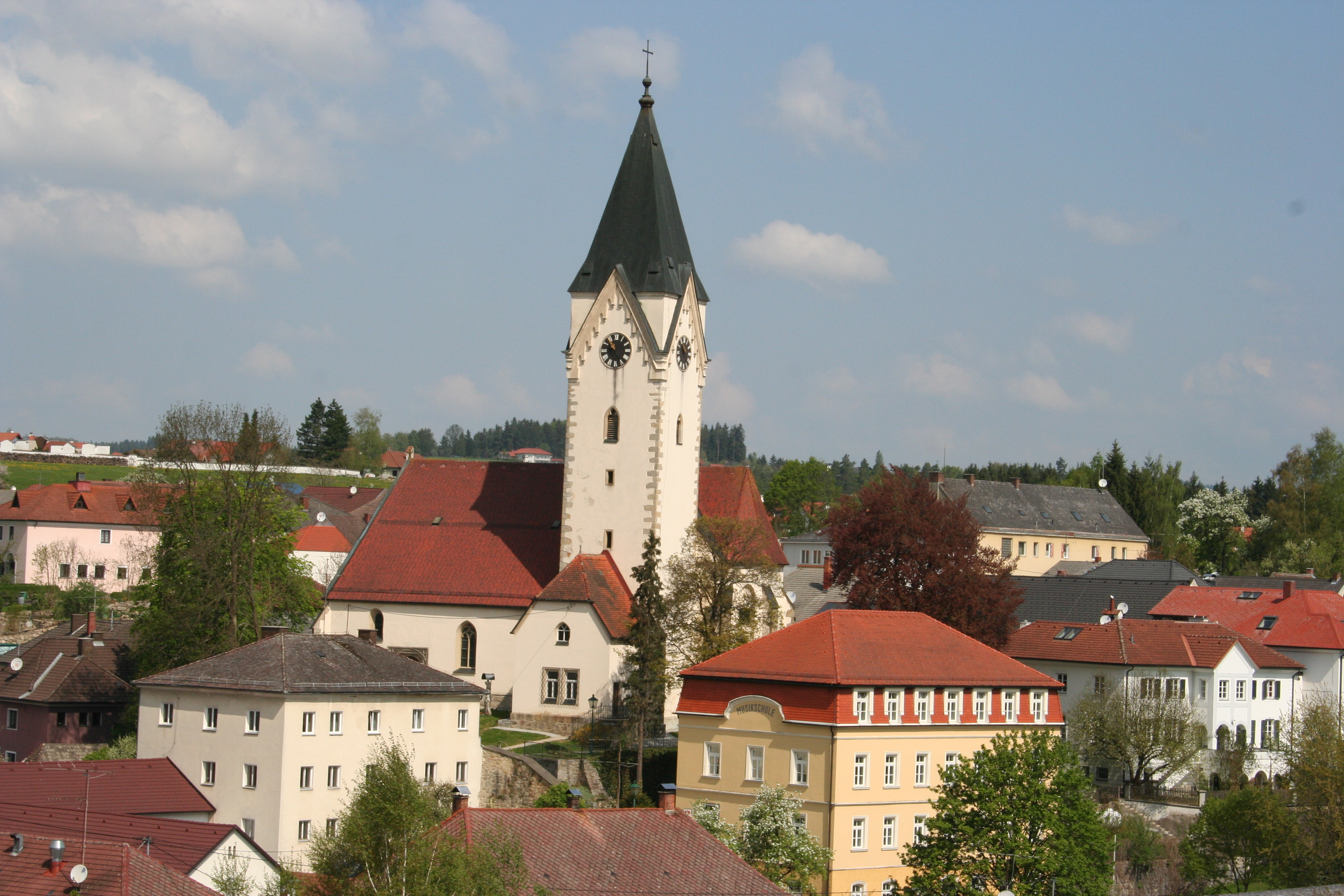
- Church of Saint John the Baptist

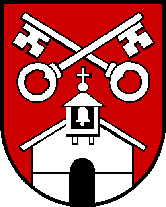
- Coat of arms

- Location within Austria
- Coordinates: 48°21′0″N 14°40′0″E
- Country: Austria
- State: Upper Austria
- District: Freistadt

Government
  - Mayor: Martin Moser (ÖVP)

Area
  - Total: 45.49 km^{2} (17.56 sq mi)
- Elevation: 515 m (1,690 ft)

Population (2018-01-01)
  - Total: 2,919
  - Density: 64.17/km^{2} (166.2/sq mi)
- Time zone: UTC+1 (CET)
  - Summer (DST): UTC+2 (CEST)
- Postal code: 4283
- Area code: 07263
- Vehicle registration: FR
- Website: www.badzell.at

Bad Zell is a municipality in the district of Freistadt in the Austrian state of Upper Austria.

== Population ==
Historical population
Year	Pop.	±%
1869	2,277	—
1880	2,426	+6.5%
1890	2,371	−2.3%
1900	2,366	−0.2%
1910	2,456	+3.8%
1923	2,431	−1.0%
1934	2,280	−6.2%
1939	2,199	−3.6%
1951	2,307	+4.9%
1961	2,417	+4.8%
1971	2,571	+6.4%
1981	2,623	+2.0%
1991	2,687	+2.4%
2001	2,716	+1.1%
2011	2,753	+1.4%
