= Kaltenberg =

- Municipality
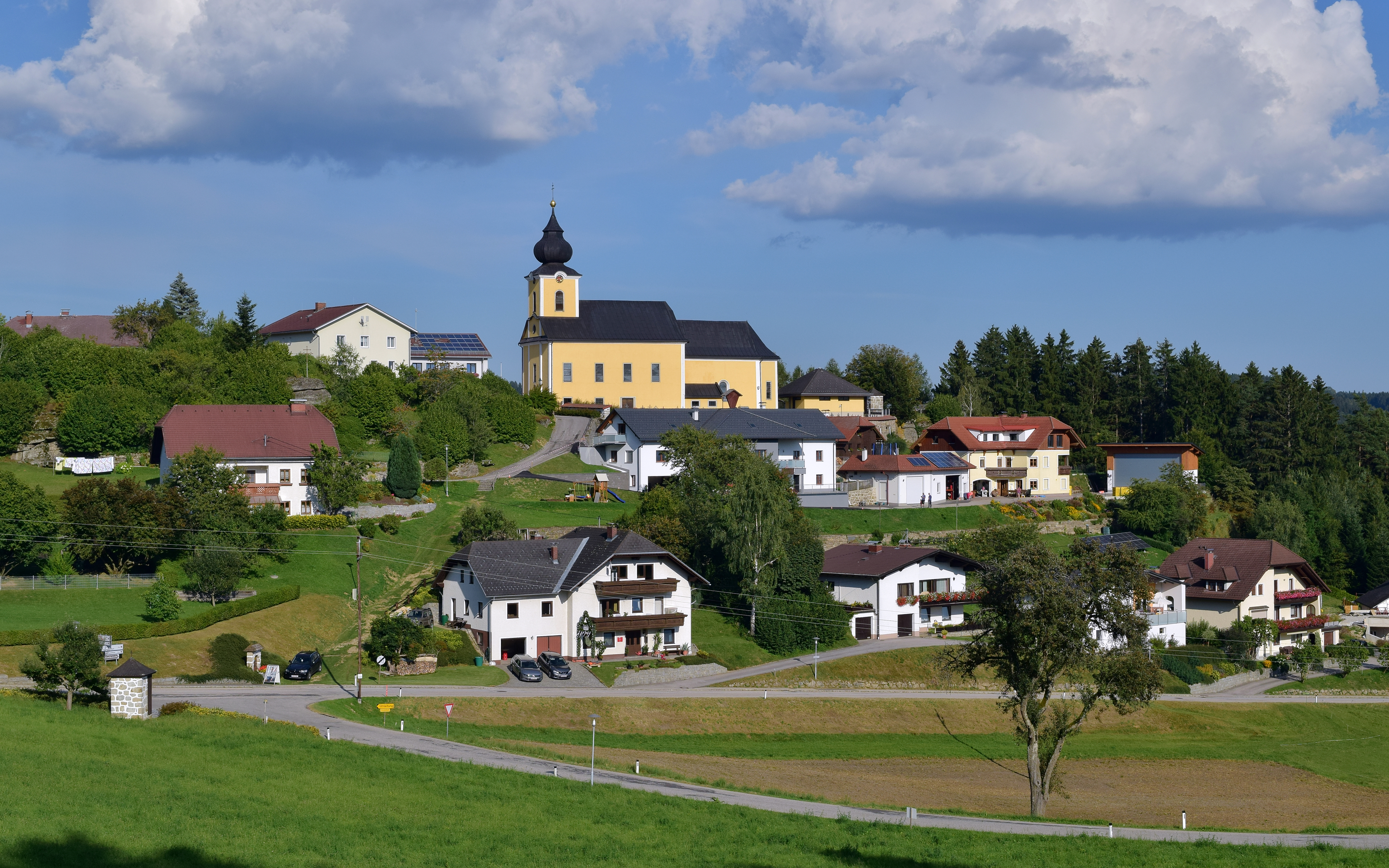
- Kaltenberg

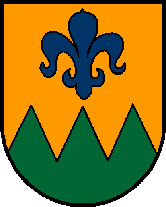
- Coat of arms

- Location within Austria
- Coordinates: 48°27′0″N 14°46′0″E
- Country: Austria
- State: Upper Austria
- District: Freistadt

Government
  - Mayor: Herbert Wurz (ÖVP)

Area
  - Total: 17.15 km^{2} (6.62 sq mi)
- Elevation: 842 m (2,762 ft)

Population (2018-01-01)
  - Total: 625
  - Density: 36.4/km^{2} (94.4/sq mi)
- Time zone: UTC+1 (CET)
  - Summer (DST): UTC+2 (CEST)
- Postal code: 4273
- Area code: 07956
- Vehicle registration: FR
- Website: www.riskommunal.at/ kaltenberg

Kaltenberg is a municipality in the district of Freistadt in the Austrian state of Upper Austria.

== Population ==
Historical population
Year	Pop.	±%
1869	630	—
1880	668	+6.0%
1890	624	−6.6%
1900	603	−3.4%
1910	619	+2.7%
1923	625	+1.0%
1934	653	+4.5%
1939	666	+2.0%
1951	659	−1.1%
1961	672	+2.0%
1971	701	+4.3%
1981	694	−1.0%
1991	666	−4.0%
2001	655	−1.7%
