= Austrian Research Promotion Agency =

Austrian organization

Ltd. company overview
- Formed: September 1, 2004 (from FFF, TiG, ASA, BIT)
- Headquarters: Vienna, Austria, 1090, Sensengasse 1
- Employees: 250
- Ltd. company executives: Henrietta Egerth; Klaus Pseiner
- Website: www.ffg.at

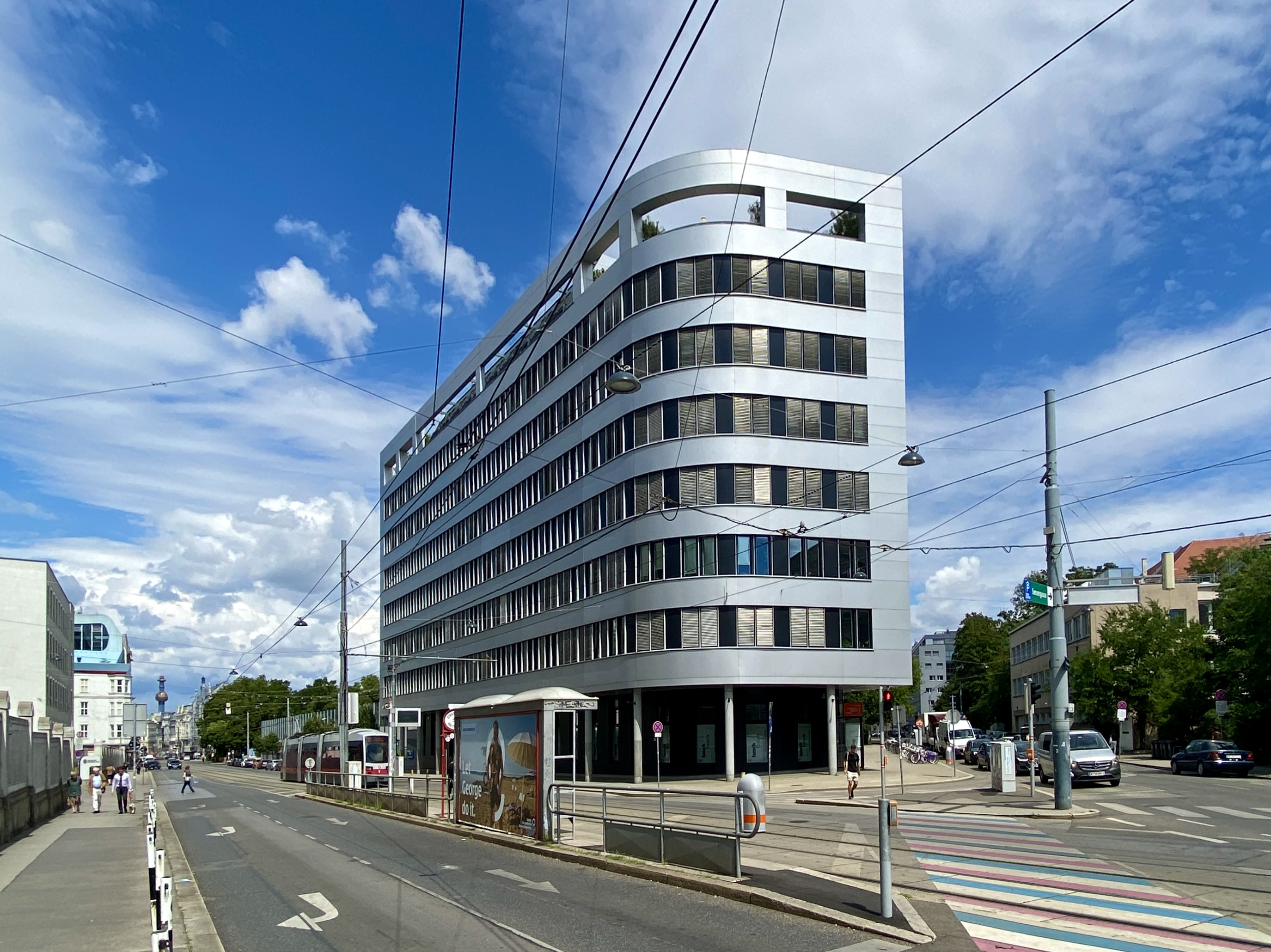
Headquarters in Vienna

The Austrian Research Promotion Agency (German: Österreichische Forschungsförderungsgesellschaft or FFG) is an organization for the promotion of research and innovation in the field of applied and industrial research in Austria and is 100% owned by the Republic of Austria. The aim is to strengthen the business location Austria through targeted programs, especially in research and development. The ownership is represented by the federal government through the Federal Ministry for Transport, Innovation and Technology and the Federal Ministry of Economics and Labour.

== History and organization ==
The Austrian Research Promotion Agency was founded in September 2004 as "the central Austrian organisation for promotion of research and innovation". It was a result of consolidating the Industrial Research Promotion Fund (FFF), the Austrian Space Agency (ASA), the Bureau for International Research and Technology Cooperation (BIT), and the Technology Impulse Society (TiG) into one Agency. The Agency moved into the Haus der Forschung in late 2005.

The FFG is divided into four areas today (base programs, structural programs, thematic programs, as well as European and International Programs) and the Agency for Aerospace. A strategy department supports the FFG and relevant ministries in the development of research policies.

The offers of the Research Promotion Agency include funding for research projects of companies and researchers in Austria, advice on choosing the right programs and assisting in the submission to European programs and international cooperation projects for Austrian researchers. The Agency for Aerospace helps to represent the interests of Austrian interests at the European Space Agency (ESA).

Through its activities FFG has broad access to information on research projects and research collaborations and information on technological trends at European level.

Services of FFG have a focus in supporting economically relevant research, however in some programs (such as BRIDGE) it also funds strategic research projects. For the funding of basic research projects its sister organization Austrian Science Fund (FWF) is mainly responsible.

== Funding ==
The priorities of the FFG are divided into the following areas:

- Basic programs - funding of bottom-up strategic projects
- Structural programs - structural funding (such as the program COMET )
- Thematic programs - top-down funding as a control element of politics
- European and international programs
- Austrian Space Program

The Austrian Research Promotion Agency promotes a yearly event called the "Austrian Champions in European Research", to award Austrian coordinators of European research projects.

== See also ==
- Austrian Space Agency – National space agency of Austria
