= Sankt Oswald bei Freistadt =

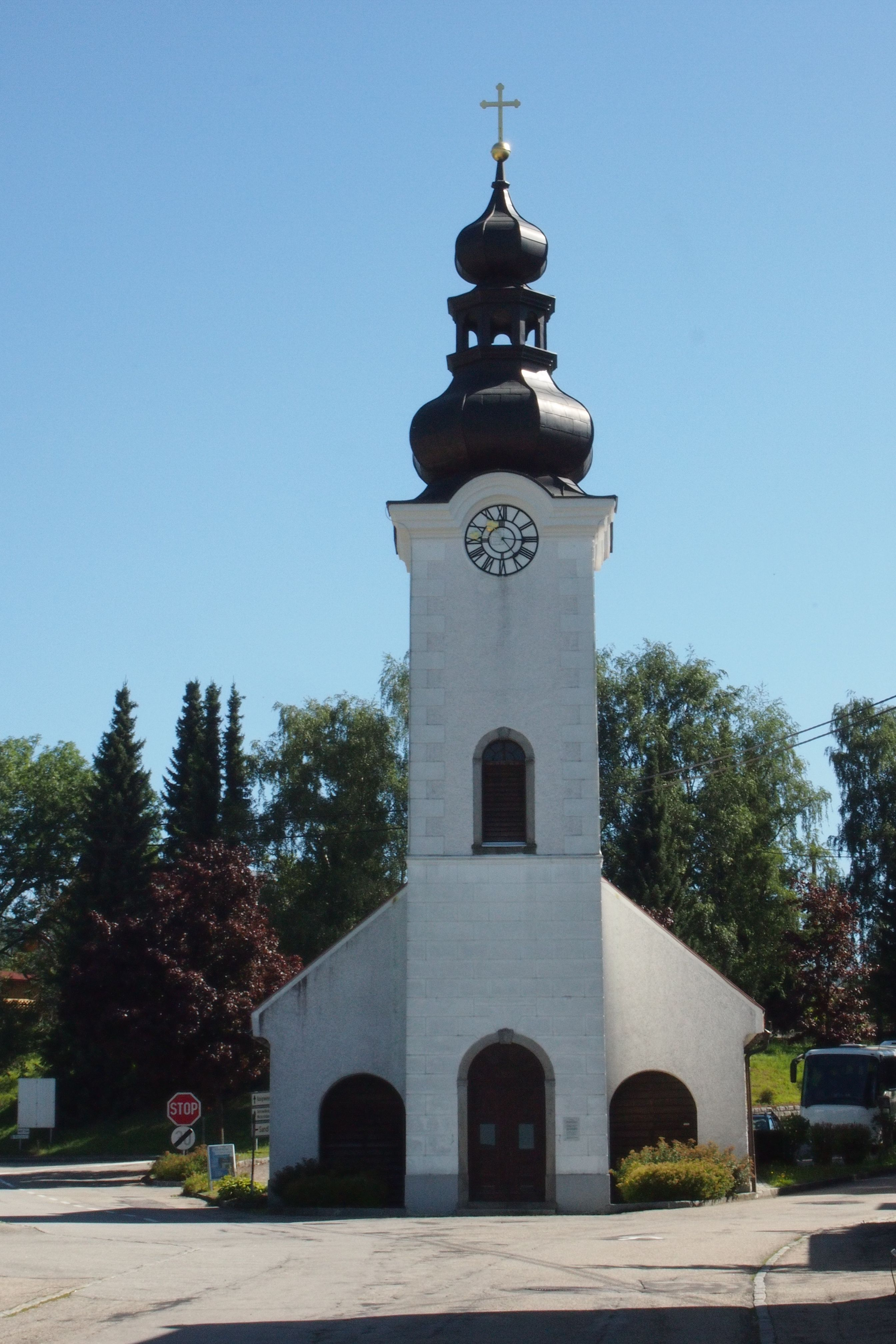

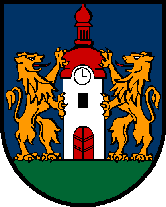
- Coat of arms

- Location within Austria
- Coordinates: 48°30′0″N 14°35′0″E
- Country: Austria
- State: Upper Austria
- District: Freistadt

Government
  - Mayor: Alois Punkenhofer (SPÖ)

Area
  - Total: 40.94 km^{2} (15.81 sq mi)
- Elevation: 608 m (1,995 ft)

Population (2018-01-01)
  - Total: 2,901
  - Density: 70.86/km^{2} (183.5/sq mi)
- Time zone: UTC+1 (CET)
  - Summer (DST): UTC+2 (CEST)
- Postal code: 4271
- Area code: 07945
- Vehicle registration: FR
- Website: www.stoswald.at

Sankt Oswald bei Freistadt is a municipality in the district of Freistadt in Austrian state of Upper Austria.

== Population ==
Historical population
Year	Pop.	±%
1869	1,922	—
1880	1,991	+3.6%
1890	2,089	+4.9%
1900	2,018	−3.4%
1910	2,028	+0.5%
1923	2,009	−0.9%
1934	2,045	+1.8%
1939	2,162	+5.7%
1951	2,238	+3.5%
1961	2,262	+1.1%
1971	2,273	+0.5%
1981	2,296	+1.0%
1991	2,518	+9.7%
2001	2,706	+7.5%
