= Sandl =

- Municipality
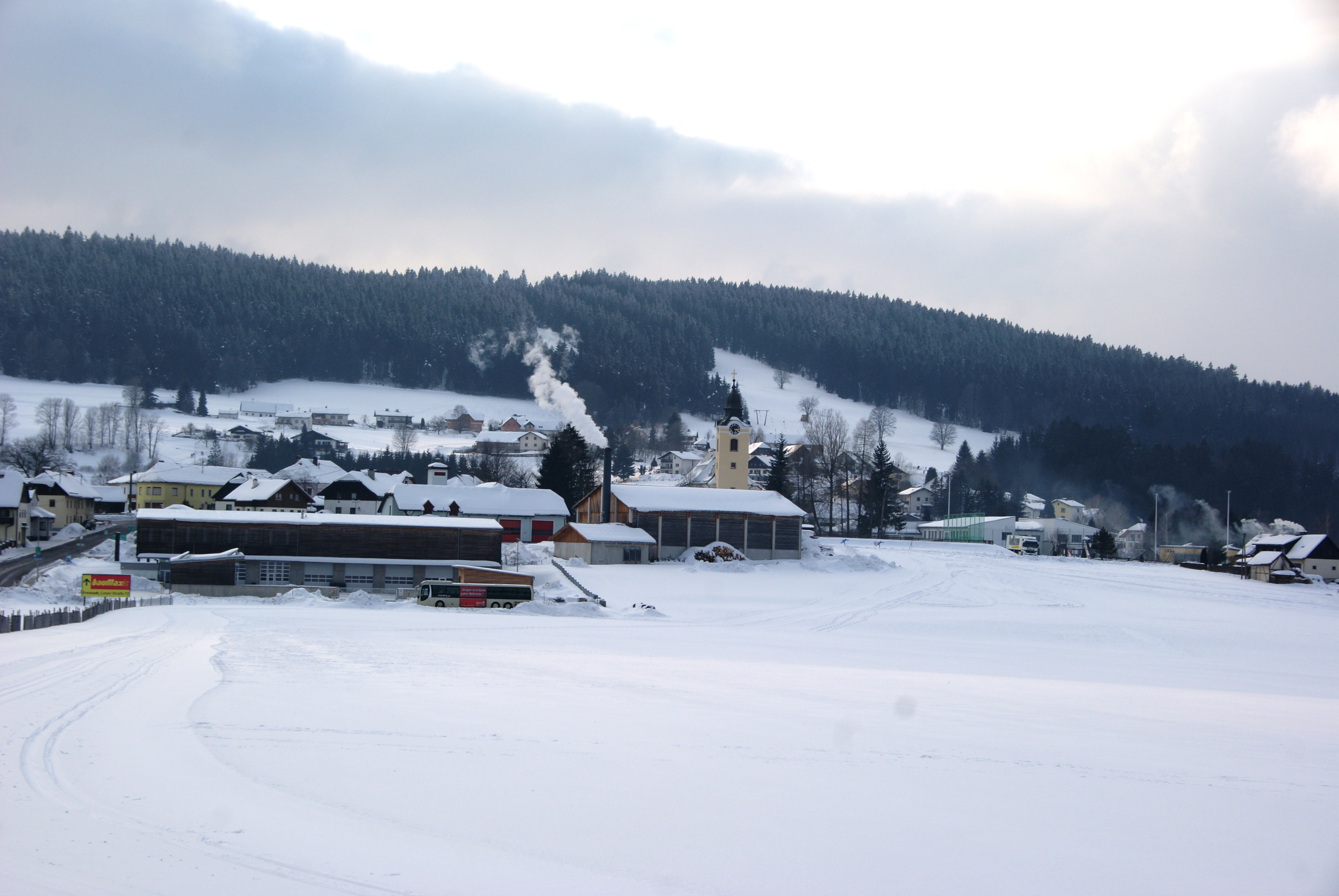

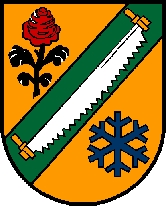
- Coat of arms

- Location of Sandl within Austria Location of Sandl within Upper Austria
- Coordinates: 48°33′40″N 14°38′40″E
- Country: Austria
- State: Upper Austria
- District: Freistadt

Government
  - Mayor: Alois Pils (SPÖ)

Area
  - Total: 58.35 km^{2} (22.53 sq mi)
- Elevation: 927 m (3,041 ft)

Population (2018-01-01)
  - Total: 1,384
  - Density: 23.72/km^{2} (61.43/sq mi)
- Time zone: UTC+1 (CET)
  - Summer (DST): UTC+2 (CEST)
- Postal code: 4251
- Area code: 07944
- Vehicle registration: FR
- Website: www.sandl.at

Sandl is a municipality in the district of Freistadt in Upper Austria, Austria.

== Geography ==
Sandl is located in the northeast of Upper Austria in the Austrian part of the Gratzen Mountains. Located in the west of the town centre, the Viehberg, with 1112 m, is the highest mountain of the Gratzener Bergland and the second highest of the Mühlviertel.

== History ==
The area surrounding Sandl came under the dominion of the Bavarian Duchy in the seventh century. The first settlers of Sand came in 1376 during the rule of Austrian Duke Albrecht III, clearing the woods between Weitra and Freistadt. The free clearing of the forest ended in 1627, when Emperor Ferdinand II handed the woods over to Leonhard Helfried Graf Meggau. Graf Meggau was the caretaker for the Lordship of Freistadt. In 1603, there were 46 houses, 2 glassworks, and a manor for the Zelkinger family mentioned in the area. In 1615, the first document mentioning the place named "Sandl" states it contained 3 houses. However, in 1957 a beam in Sandl No. 38 was found dated 1508, a full century before official mention of Sandl's existence. By 1700, there were 22 houses in Sandl.

In 1739, Alois Thomas Raimund Reichsgraf von Harrach founded Sandl's parish, and in 1742 construction of the church and school was begun. From 1717 until 1754, a glassworks operated on the Hengstberg, then in the locality of Gugu. Efforts to expand the factory failed, but a bottling firm remained for years, until it was turned into a museum. The area suffered French incursions in 1805 and 1809, during the Napoleonic Wars.

Since 1918, Sandl has been part of Bundesland Upper Austria. Following the Anschluss with Germany on 13 March 1938, the locality was part of Gau Oberdonau but in 1945 was restored to Bundesland Upper Austria.

=== Notgeld ===
Like many municipalities of Upper Austria, Sandl issued Notgeld for collectors in 1920. Sandl was more prolific than most, with all but one of its localities issuing special series (Sonderserien) in limited prints. Several hundred varieties exist.

== Population ==
Since 1961 the population is continuously shrinking. Sandl is facing similar problems like other peripheral villages (shortage of jobs, etc… ), which may be the cause of emigration.

2001 98.5% of the inhabitants declared German as their common language.

Historical population
| Year | Pop. | ±% |
|---|---|---|
| 1869 | 1,677 | — |
| 1880 | 1,644 | −2.0% |
| 1890 | 1,673 | +1.8% |
| 1900 | 1,781 | +6.5% |
| 1910 | 1,766 | −0.8% |
| 1923 | 1,666 | −5.7% |
| 1934 | 1,782 | +7.0% |
| 1939 | 1,725 | −3.2% |
| 1951 | 1,633 | −5.3% |
| 1961 | 1,768 | +8.3% |
| 1971 | 1,730 | −2.1% |
| 1981 | 1,558 | −9.9% |
| 1991 | 1,531 | −1.7% |
| 2001 | 1,467 | −4.2% |

== Localities ==
- Eben
- Großgstötten
- Gugu
- Hacklbrunn
- Hundsberg
- Königsau
- Neuhof
- Plochwald
- Pürstling
- Rindlberg
- Rosenhof
- Rothenbachl
- Sandl
- Schönberg
- Steinkreuz
- Steinwald
- Tafelberg
- Viehberg
- Weinviertl
