= Sankt Leonhard bei Freistadt =

- Municipality
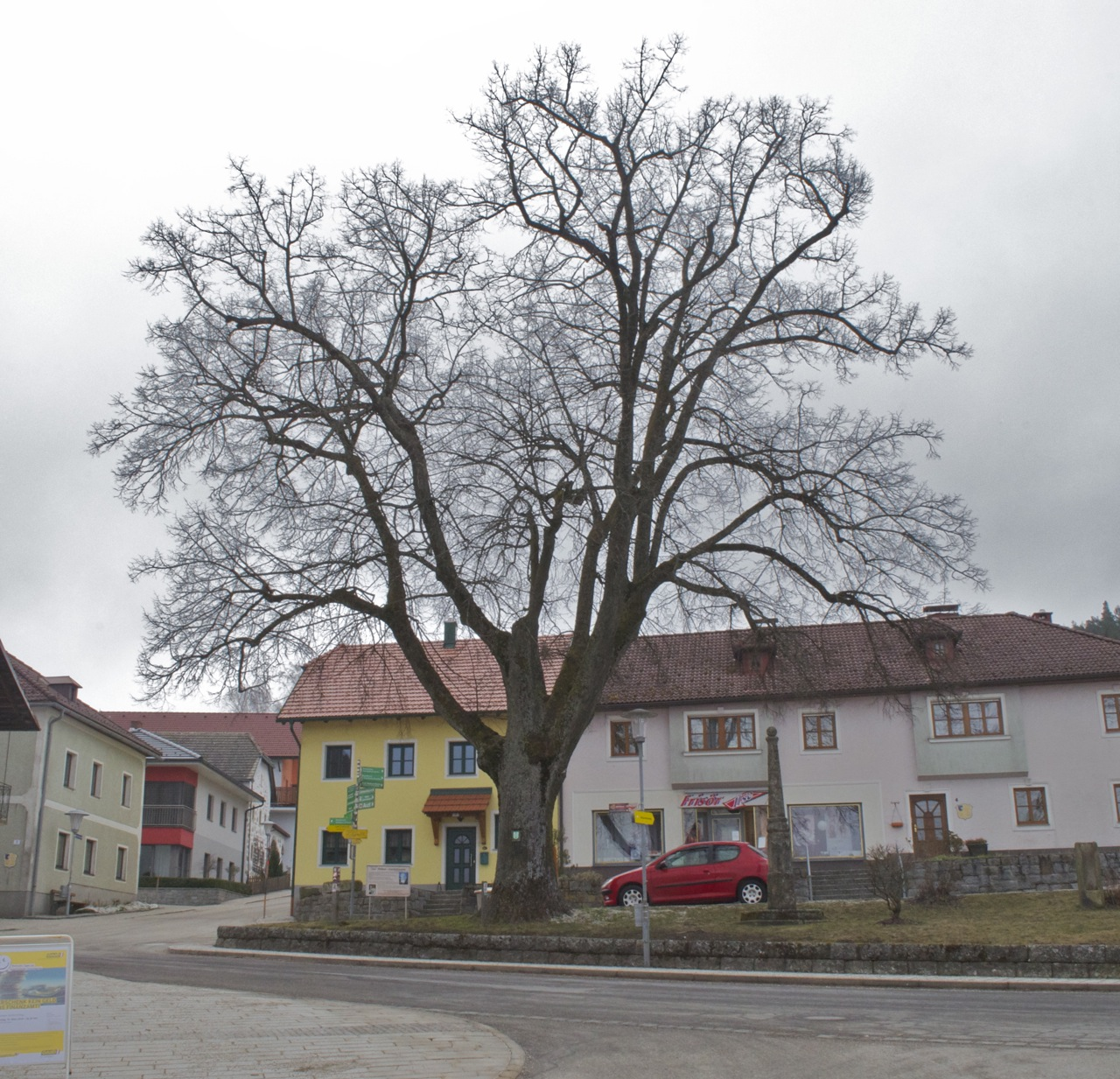
- Village centre with the village linden tree ("Dorflinde")

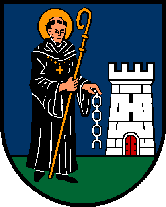
- Coat of arms

- Location within Austria
- Coordinates: 48°26′40″N 14°40′40″E
- Country: Austria
- State: Upper Austria
- District: Freistadt

Government
  - Mayor: Josef Langthaler (ÖVP)

Area
  - Total: 34.99 km^{2} (13.51 sq mi)
- Elevation: 810 m (2,660 ft)

Population (2018-01-01)
  - Total: 1,394
  - Density: 39.84/km^{2} (103.2/sq mi)
- Time zone: UTC+1 (CET)
  - Summer (DST): UTC+2 (CEST)
- Postal code: 4294
- Area code: 07952
- Vehicle registration: FR
- Website: www.riskommunal.at/ stleonhardfreistadt

Sankt Leonhard bei Freistadt is a municipality in the district of Freistadt in the Austrian state of Upper Austria.

== Population ==
Historical population
Year	Pop.	±%
1869	1,624	—
1880	1,560	−3.9%
1890	1,538	−1.4%
1900	1,508	−2.0%
1910	1,447	−4.0%
1923	1,546	+6.8%
1934	1,600	+3.5%
1939	1,484	−7.3%
1951	1,549	+4.4%
1961	1,556	+0.5%
1971	1,555	−0.1%
1981	1,474	−5.2%
1991	1,502	+1.9%
2001	1,476	−1.7%
2012	1,432	−3.0%
