= Liebenau, Upper Austria =

Liebenau
- Municipality
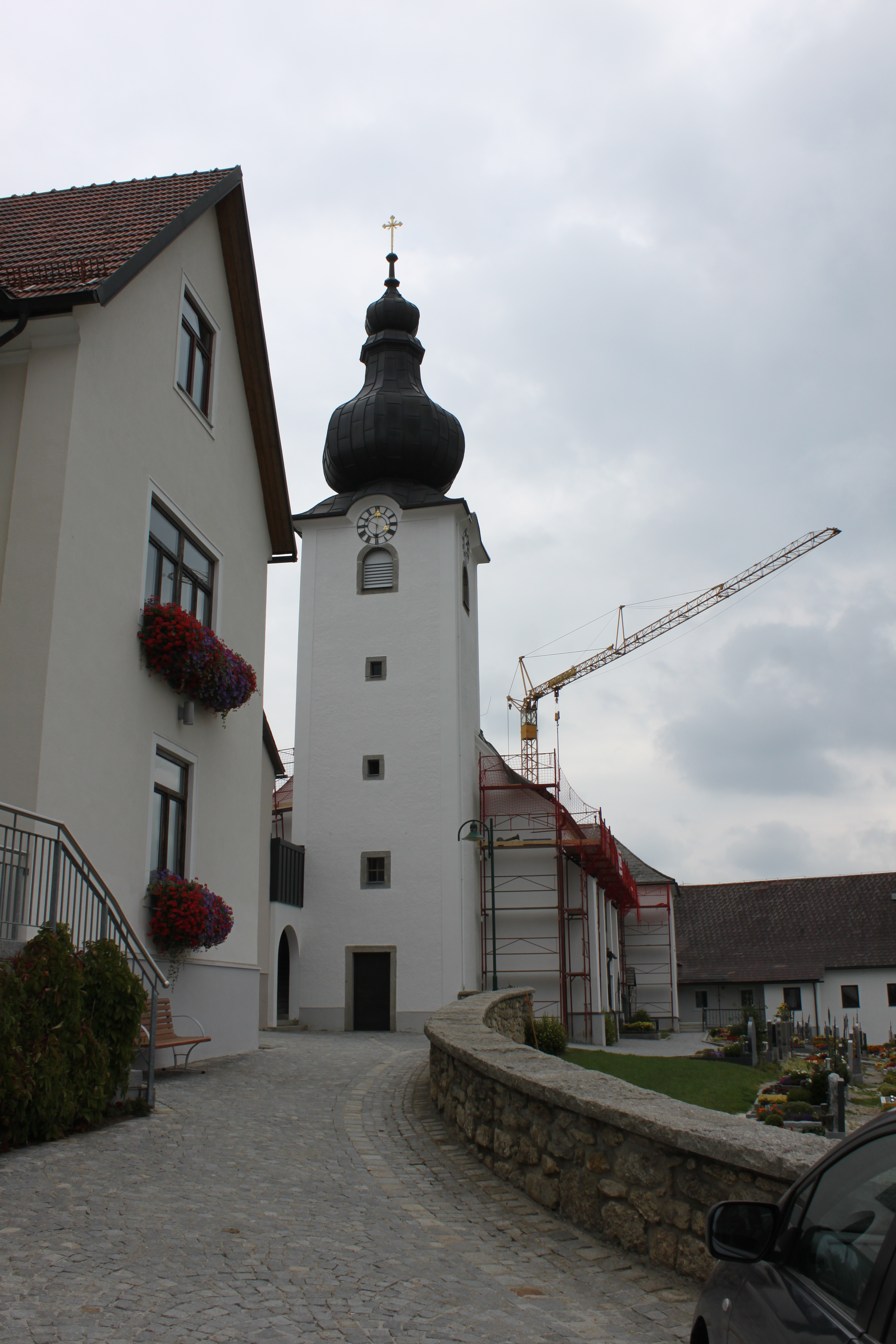

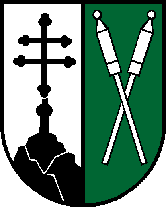
- Coat of arms

- Location within Austria
- Coordinates: 48°31′50″N 14°48′20″E
- Country: Austria
- State: Upper Austria
- District: Freistadt

Government
  - Mayor: August Reichenberger (ÖVP)

Area
  - Total: 76.26 km^{2} (29.44 sq mi)
- Elevation: 970 m (3,180 ft)

Population (2018-01-01)
  - Total: 1,597
  - Density: 20.94/km^{2} (54.24/sq mi)
- Time zone: UTC+1 (CET)
  - Summer (DST): UTC+2 (CEST)
- Postal code: 4252
- Area code: 07953
- Vehicle registration: FR
- Website: www.liebenau.at

Liebenau is a municipality in the district of Freistadt in the Austrian state of Upper Austria.

== Localities ==
- Eibenberg
- Geierschlag
- Glashütten
- Hirschau
- Kienau
- Komau
- Leopoldstein
- Liebenstein
- Maxldorf
- Monegg
- Neustift
- Reitern
- Schanz
- Schöneben
- Windhagmühl

== Population ==
Historical population
Year	Pop.	±%
1869	2,154	—
1880	2,313	+7.4%
1890	2,398	+3.7%
1900	2,345	−2.2%
1910	2,378	+1.4%
1923	2,352	−1.1%
1934	2,496	+6.1%
1939	2,415	−3.2%
1951	2,256	−6.6%
1961	2,314	+2.6%
1971	2,249	−2.8%
1981	2,108	−6.3%
1991	1,957	−7.2%
2001	1,840	−6.0%
