= Joanneum Research =

Non-academic research institute in Austria

JOANNEUM RESEARCH Forschungsgesellschaft mbH
- Type: Gesellschaft mit beschränkter Haftung
- Industry: Applied research, R&D, consulting
- Founded: 1960s; 1986 (as GmbH)
- Headquarters: Graz, Austria
- Key people: Dr. Heinz Mayer (CEO)
- Owner: Province of Styria and BABEG - Kärntner Betriebsansiedlungs- & Beteiligungsgesellschaft
- Number of employees: 450 (July 2015)
- Website: www.joanneum.at

Joanneum Research Forschungsgesellschaft mbH is one of the largest non-academic research institutes in Austria. Besides its headquarters in Graz it is also based in Weiz, Hartberg, Niklasdorf, Klagenfurt and Vienna. 85 percent of the company are owned by the province of Styria, the remaining 15 percent are held by the province of Carinthia.
