= Neumarkt im Mühlkreis =

- Municipality
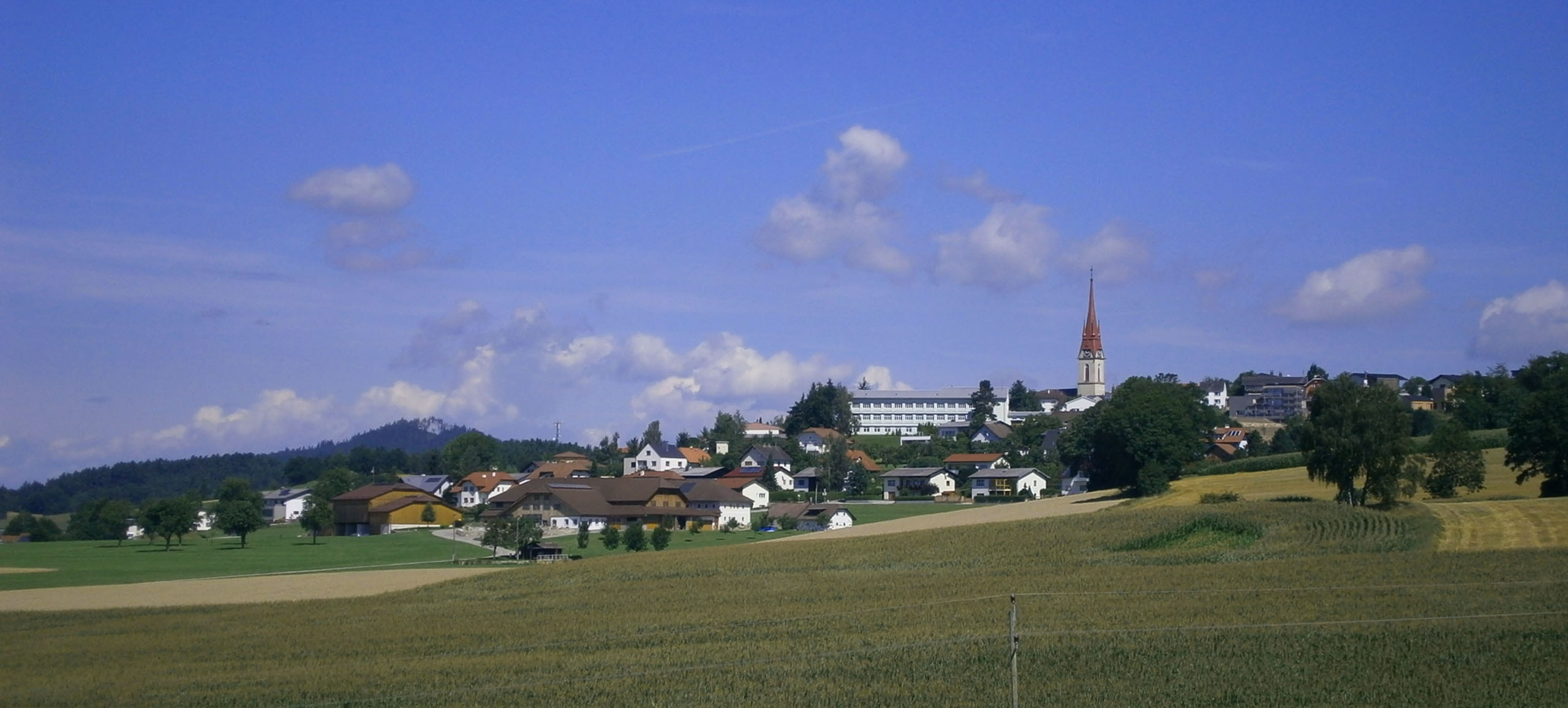

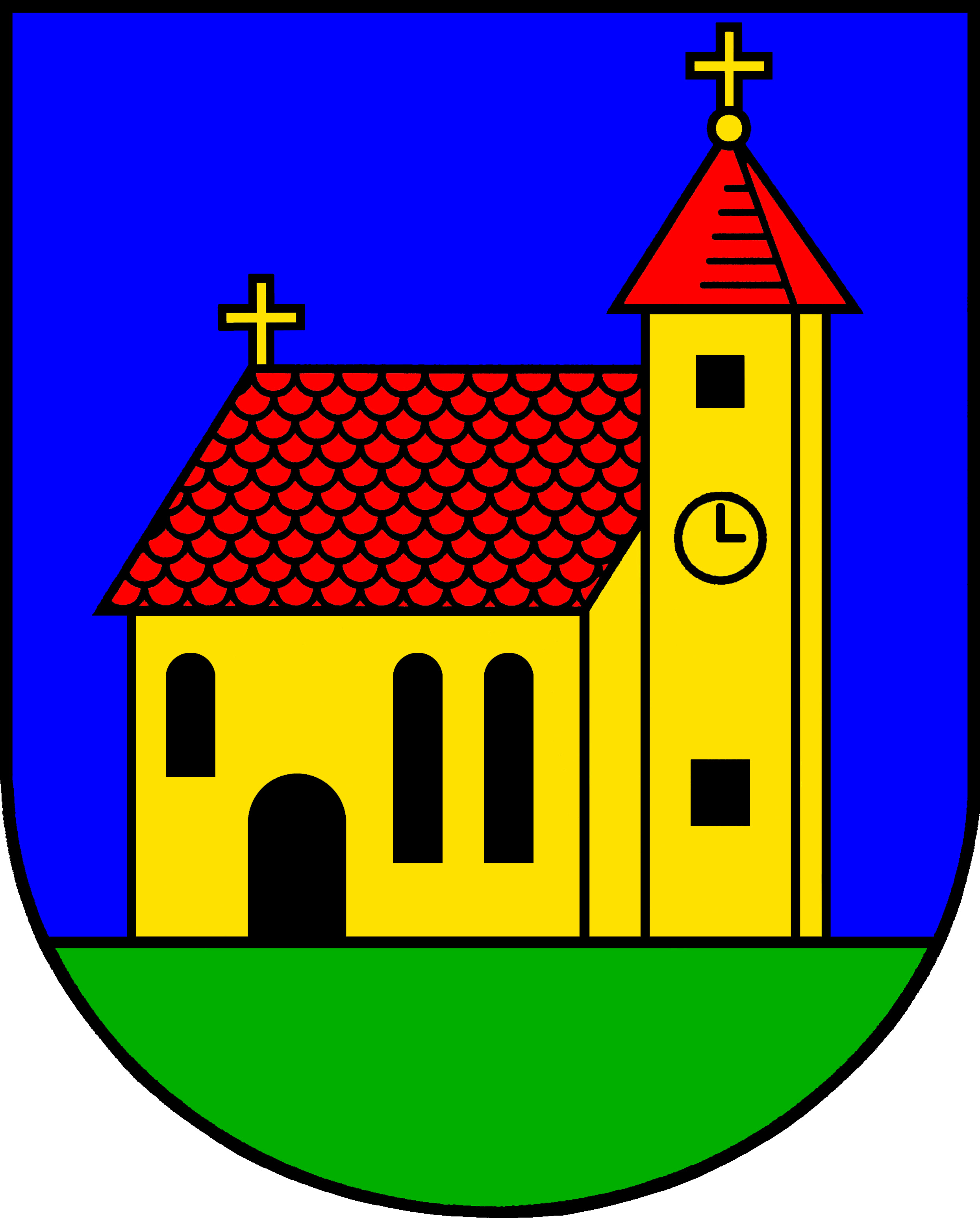
- Coat of arms

- Location within Austria
- Coordinates: 48°25′40″N 14°29′00″E
- Country: Austria
- State: Upper Austria
- District: Freistadt

Government
  - Mayor: Christian Denkmaier (SPÖ)

Area
  - Total: 46.71 km^{2} (18.03 sq mi)
- Elevation: 632 m (2,073 ft)

Population (2018-01-01)
  - Total: 3,163
  - Density: 67.72/km^{2} (175.4/sq mi)
- Time zone: UTC+1 (CET)
  - Summer (DST): UTC+2 (CEST)
- Postal code: 4212
- Area code: 07941
- Vehicle registration: FR
- Website: www.neumarkt-muehlkreis.ooe.gv.at

Neumarkt im Mühlkreis is a municipality in the district of Freistadt in the Austrian state of Upper Austria.

== Population ==
Historical population
Year	Pop.	±%
1869	2,229	—
1880	2,275	+2.1%
1890	2,290	+0.7%
1900	2,233	−2.5%
1910	2,326	+4.2%
1923	2,428	+4.4%
1934	2,425	−0.1%
1939	2,309	−4.8%
1951	2,317	+0.3%
1961	2,359	+1.8%
1971	2,485	+5.3%
1981	2,539	+2.2%
1991	2,743	+8.0%
2001	3,071	+12.0%
2018	3,163	+3.0%
