= Rainbach im Mühlkreis =

- Municipality
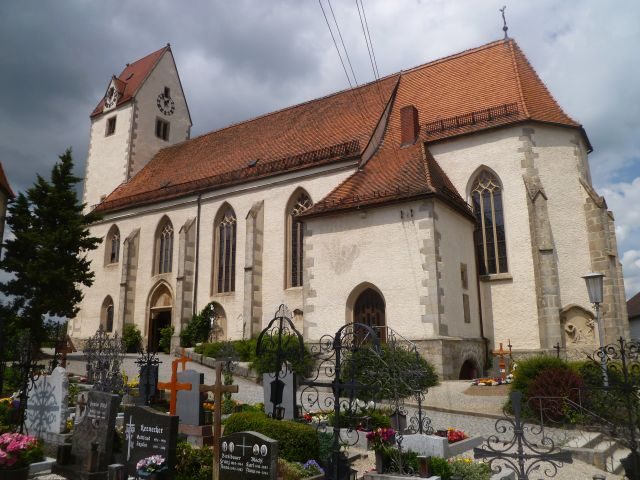

- Coat of arms

- Location within Austria
- Coordinates: 48°33′40″N 14°28′40″E
- Country: Austria
- State: Upper Austria
- District: Freistadt

Government
  - Mayor: Friedrich Stockinger (ÖVP)

Area
  - Total: 49.09 km^{2} (18.95 sq mi)
- Elevation: 719 m (2,359 ft)

Population (2018-01-01)
  - Total: 2,959
  - Density: 60.28/km^{2} (156.1/sq mi)
- Time zone: UTC+1 (CET)
  - Summer (DST): UTC+2 (CEST)
- Postal code: 4261
- Area code: 07949
- Vehicle registration: FR
- Website: www.rainbach-mkr.at

Rainbach im Mühlkreis is a municipality in the district of Freistadt in the Austrian state of Upper Austria.

== Population ==
Historical population
Year	Pop.	±%
1869	2,335	—
1880	2,501	+7.1%
1890	2,386	−4.6%
1900	2,381	−0.2%
1910	2,491	+4.6%
1923	2,634	+5.7%
1934	2,617	−0.6%
1939	2,602	−0.6%
1951	2,759	+6.0%
1961	2,729	−1.1%
1971	2,776	+1.7%
1981	2,763	−0.5%
1991	2,881	+4.3%
2001	2,934	+1.8%
