= Unterweitersdorf =

- Municipality
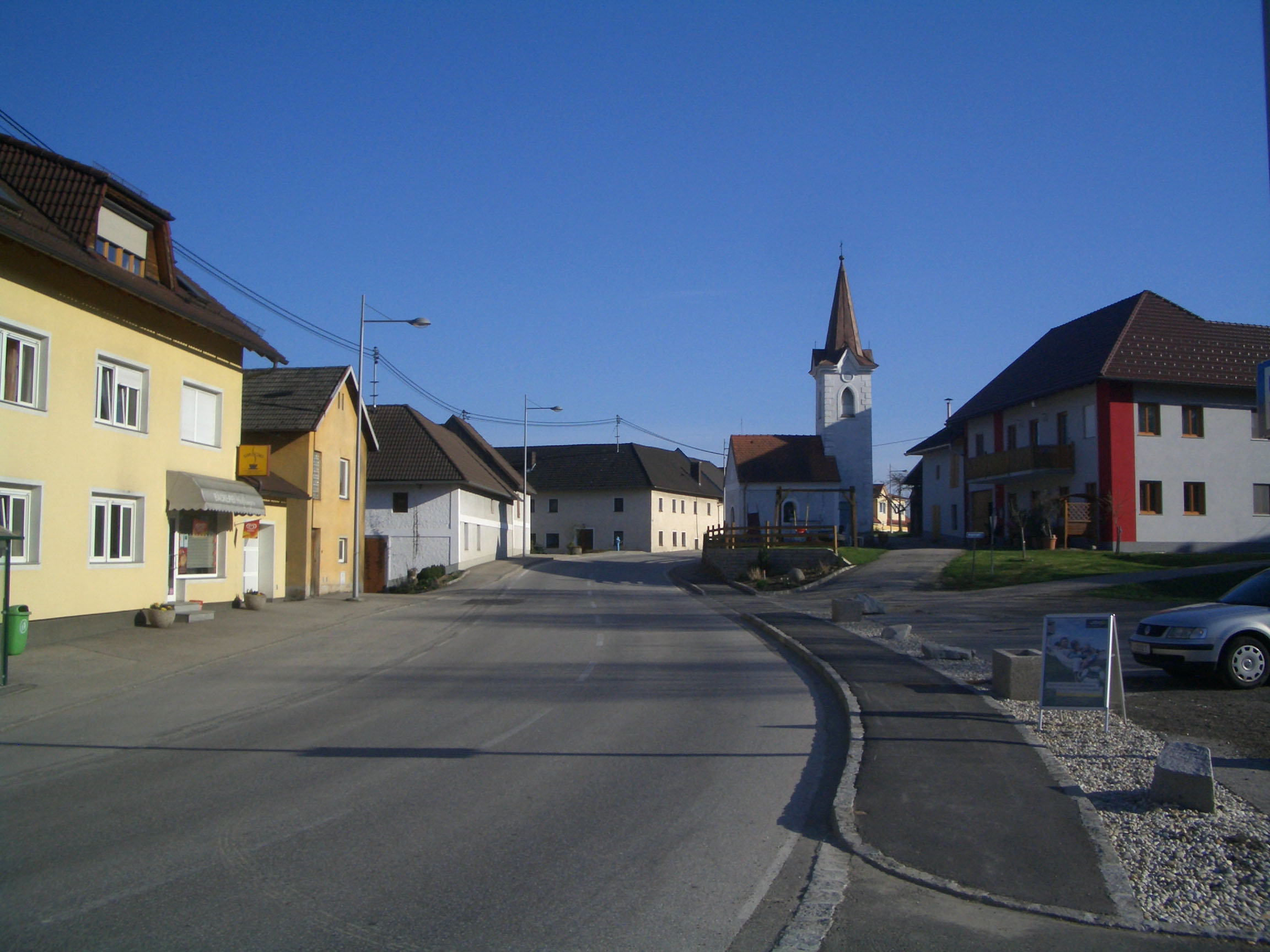

- Coat of arms

- Location within Austria
- Coordinates: 48°22′0″N 14°28′0″E
- Country: Austria
- State: Upper Austria
- District: Freistadt

Government
  - Mayor: Wilhelm Wurm (SPÖ)

Area
  - Total: 11.41 km^{2} (4.41 sq mi)
- Elevation: 333 m (1,093 ft)

Population (2018-01-01)
  - Total: 2,082
  - Density: 182.5/km^{2} (472.6/sq mi)
- Time zone: UTC+1 (CET)
  - Summer (DST): UTC+2 (CEST)
- Postal code: 4213
- Area code: 07235
- Vehicle registration: FR
- Website: www.unterweitersdorf.at

Unterweitersdorf is a municipality in the district of Freistadt in the Austrian state of Upper Austria.

== Population ==
Historical population
Year	Pop.	±%
1869	629	—
1880	635	+1.0%
1890	653	+2.8%
1900	649	−0.6%
1910	682	+5.1%
1923	662	−2.9%
1934	651	−1.7%
1939	625	−4.0%
1951	617	−1.3%
1961	768	+24.5%
1971	893	+16.3%
1981	1,170	+31.0%
1991	1,415	+20.9%
2001	1,704	+20.4%
