= Leopoldschlag =

- Municipality
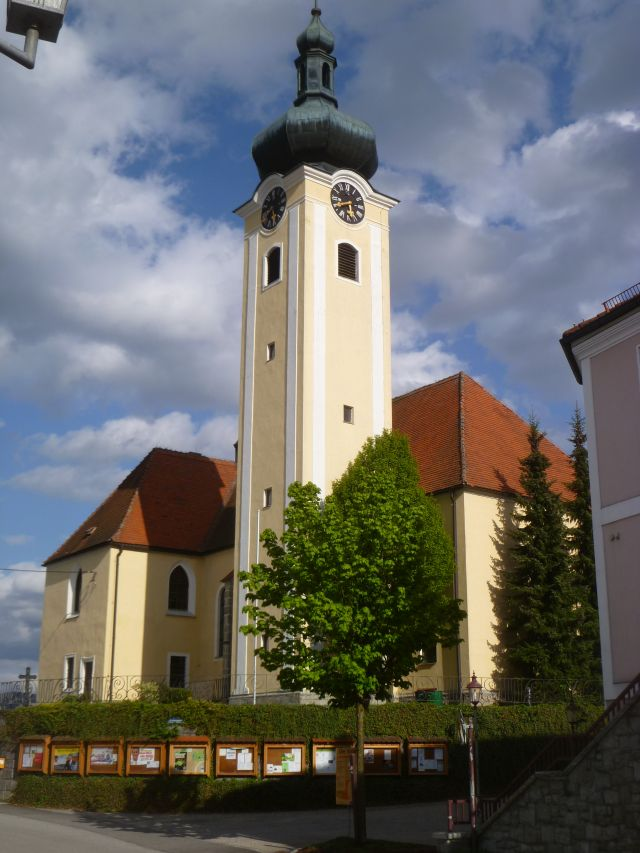

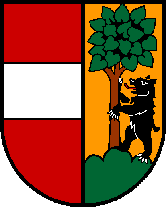
- Coat of arms

- Location within Austria
- Coordinates: 48°37′0″N 14°30′0″E
- Country: Austria
- State: Upper Austria
- District: Freistadt

Government
  - Mayor: Alois Böhm (ÖVP)

Area
  - Total: 25.68 km^{2} (9.92 sq mi)
- Elevation: 630 m (2,070 ft)

Population (2018-01-01)
  - Total: 1,023
  - Density: 39.84/km^{2} (103.2/sq mi)
- Time zone: UTC+1 (CET)
  - Summer (DST): UTC+2 (CEST)
- Postal code: 4262
- Area code: 07949
- Vehicle registration: FR
- Website: www.leopoldschlag.at

Leopoldschlag is a municipality in the district of Freistadt in the Austrian state of Upper Austria. It is located on the European continental divide between the watershed of the Elbe and the Danube, on the border with the Czech Republic.

== Population ==
Historical population
Year	Pop.	±%
1869	1,380	—
1880	1,317	−4.6%
1890	1,299	−1.4%
1900	1,309	+0.8%
1910	1,267	−3.2%
1923	1,298	+2.4%
1934	1,212	−6.6%
1939	1,135	−6.4%
1951	1,248	+10.0%
1961	1,175	−5.8%
1971	1,189	+1.2%
1981	1,110	−6.6%
1991	1,115	+0.5%
2001	1,086	−2.6%
2013	1,038	−4.4%

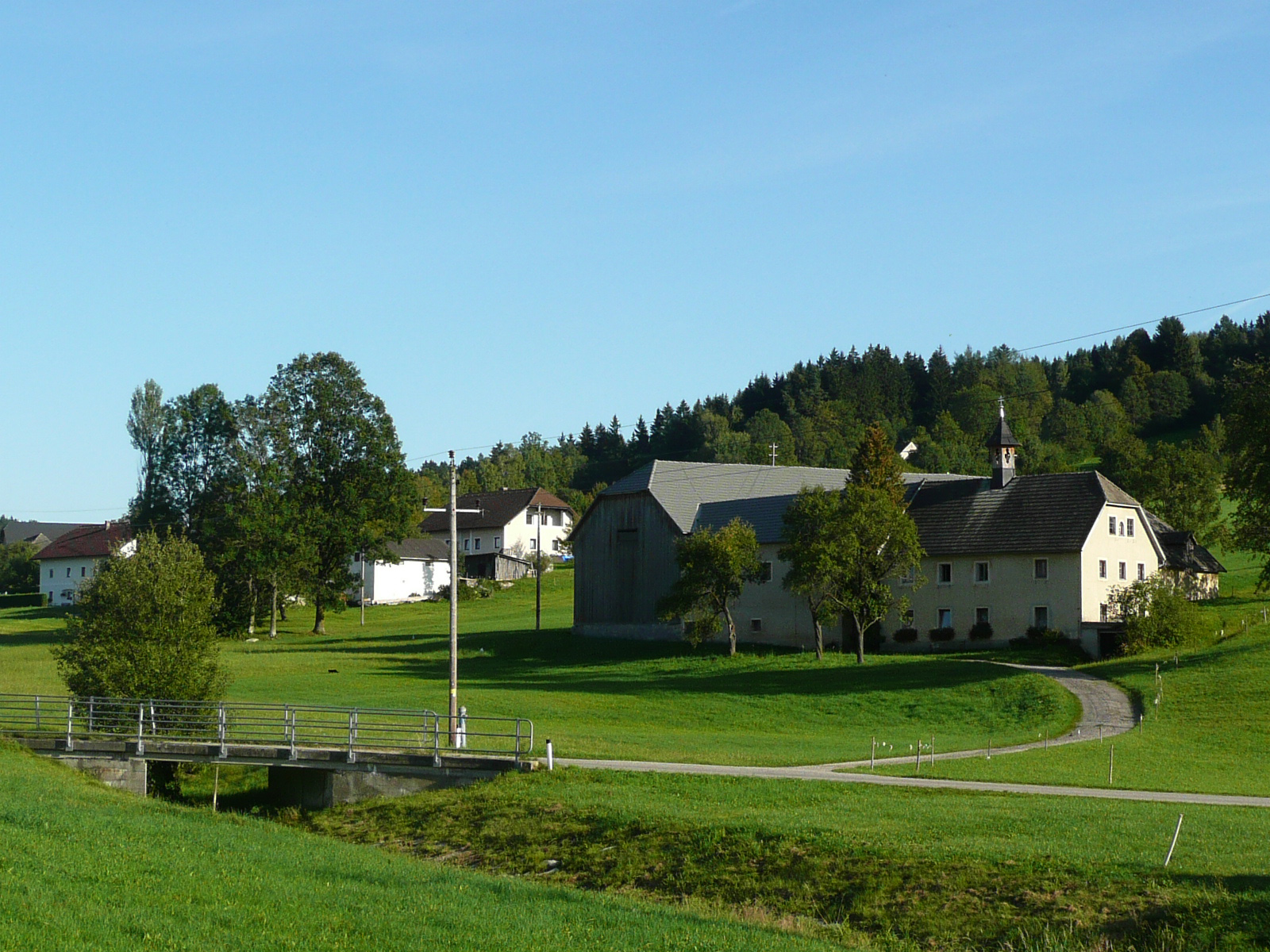
Farm in Mardetschlag

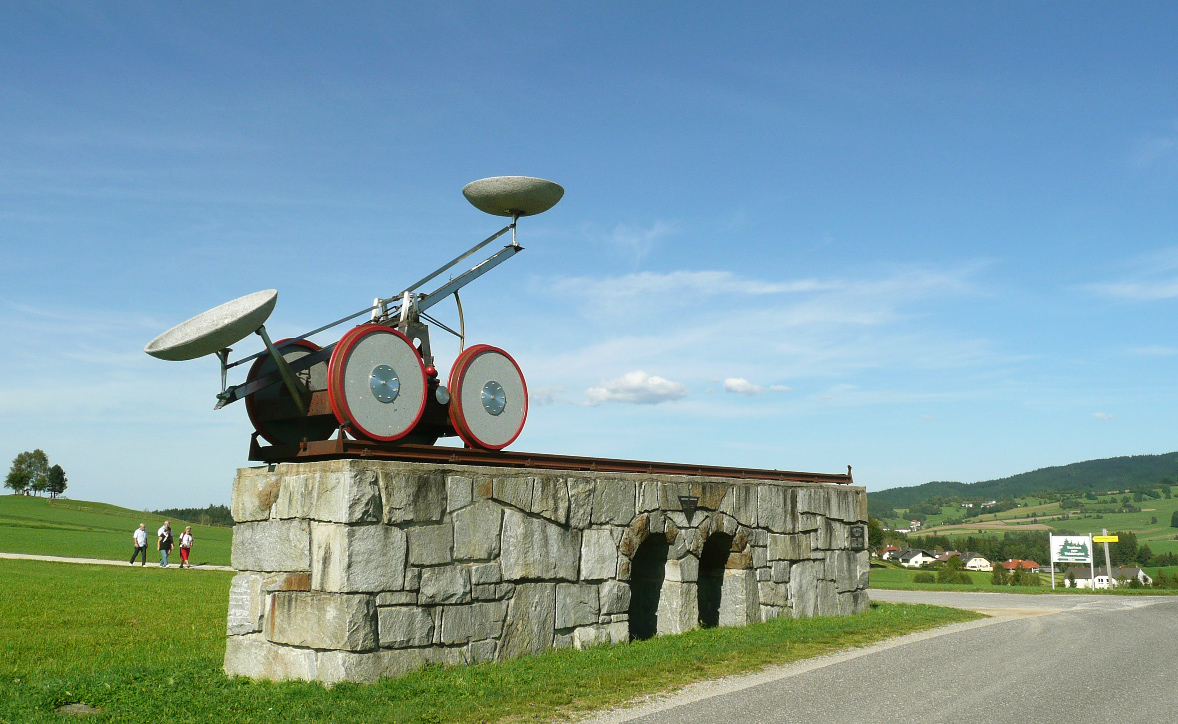
European Water Divide monument
