= Bundesautobahn 1 =

Federal motorway in Germany

A 1
- Bundesautobahn 1

Route information
- Part of E22, E29, E37, E44, E47, E233, and E422
- Length: 749 km (465 mi)

Major junctions
- North end: Heiligenhafen
- A 7 / A 39 in Seevetal; A 7 in Seevetal; A 2 in Kamen; A 3 in Leverkusen; A 4 in Köln; A 6 / A 62 in Nonnweiler; A 8 / A 623 in Illingen
- South end: Saarbrücken

Location
- Country: Germany
- States: Schleswig-Holstein, Hamburg, Niedersachsen, Bremen, North Rhine-Westphalia, Rhineland-Palatinate, Saarland

Highway system
- Roads in Germany; Autobahns; List; Federal; List; State; E-roads
← A 995	→ A 2

Bundesautobahn 1 (translates from German as Federal Motorway 1, short form Autobahn 1, abbreviated as BAB 1 or A 1) is an autobahn in Germany. It runs from Heiligenhafen in Schleswig-Holstein to Saarbrücken in Saarland, a distance of 749 km (465 mi), but is incomplete between Cologne and Trier. B 207 continues north from Heiligenhafen to Puttgarden, at the end of the island of Fehmarn, with a ferry to Rødby, Denmark.

The part north of Hamburg is part of the Vogelfluglinie (Migratory Birds Line) and may be one day connected via a fixed link to Denmark (see below). The term Hansalinie (Hansa line) refers to the part from Lübeck (north of Hamburg, thus overlapping the Vogelfluglinie) south to the Ruhr Area (near Dortmund).

== Overview ==
=== Schleswig-Holstein ===
In Schleswig-Holstein, the initial section of the A1 (which belongs to the so-called Vogelfluglinie) begins at the junction Heiligenhafen East as a four-lane extension of the B 207 coming from the ferry port Puttgarden on the island of Fehmarn. On the peninsula Wagrien the A 1 briefly runs west, then south, past the East Holstein cities of Oldenburg in Holstein and Neustadt in Holstein. In the area of the Bay of Lübeck, for a length of about 10 km the Baltic Sea coast is touched, which is approached up to about one kilometer at Haffkrug. Before further south the Hanseatic city of Lübeck is reached, at the triangle Bad Schwartau the A1 joins the A 226 coming from Travemünde and becomes a six-lane highway. After crossing the Lübeck city area, there is a connection to the Baltic Sea motorway A 20 in the direction of Rostock on the Lübeck interchange Lübecker Kreuz. From here the highway leads in a southwesterly direction through the district of Stormarn, past the small towns of Reinfeld and Bad Oldesloe to the motorway junction Bargteheide, the current terminus of the A 21 from Kiel. Two eastern suburbs of Hamburg, Bargteheide and Ahrensburg, are also connected. Shortly before reaching the Hamburg city area the A 1 crosses the A 24 (Hamburg-Horn-Berlin) in an elongated crossing construction, the cross Hamburg East (Kreuz Hamburg-Ost).

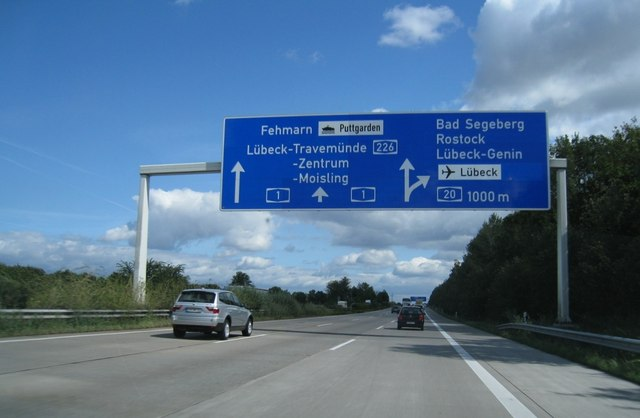
Six-carriageway at Lübeck

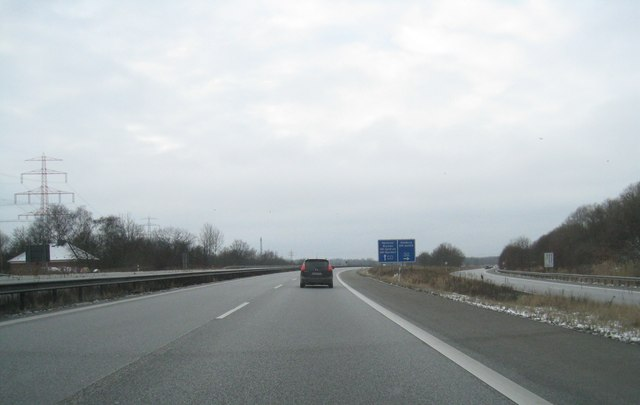
At Kreuz Hamburg-Ost

=== Hamburg ===
At Hamburg, which is passed on its eastern side, the A 1 passes through the suburb of Billstedt and under the Hamburg-Billwerder rail yard in a tunnel that is around 240 meters long. Following this, the A 25 to Geesthacht branches off at the triangle Hamburg South-East. After crossing the Norderelbe on a cable-stayed bridge, the main carriageway of the A 1 at the Hamburg-Süd intersection joins the main carriageway coming from Veddel, which as A 255 connects it to the Hamburg city center via Elbbrücken bridges. At the same time, the only 1.5 km long A 252 branches off into the Hamburg harbor area. After the crossing, the main carriageway of the A 1 continues back south, crosses the Süderelbe at Hamburg-Harburg and, already in Lower Saxony, crosses the A 39 to Lüneburg at Maschener Kreuz. At the following Horster Dreieck the main carriageway of the A 1 changes again, the continuous relation forms the A 7 to Hannover, while the A 1 continues with four lanes to the west. Only from the Buchholz Triangle, which ties the A 261 as a connection to the A 7 in the direction of Flensburg, there are again six lanes.

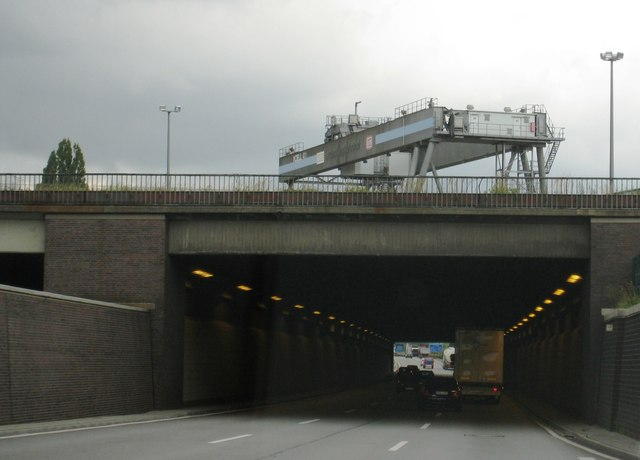
Tunnel Billwerder-Moorfleet under the container station, Hamburg-Billwerder

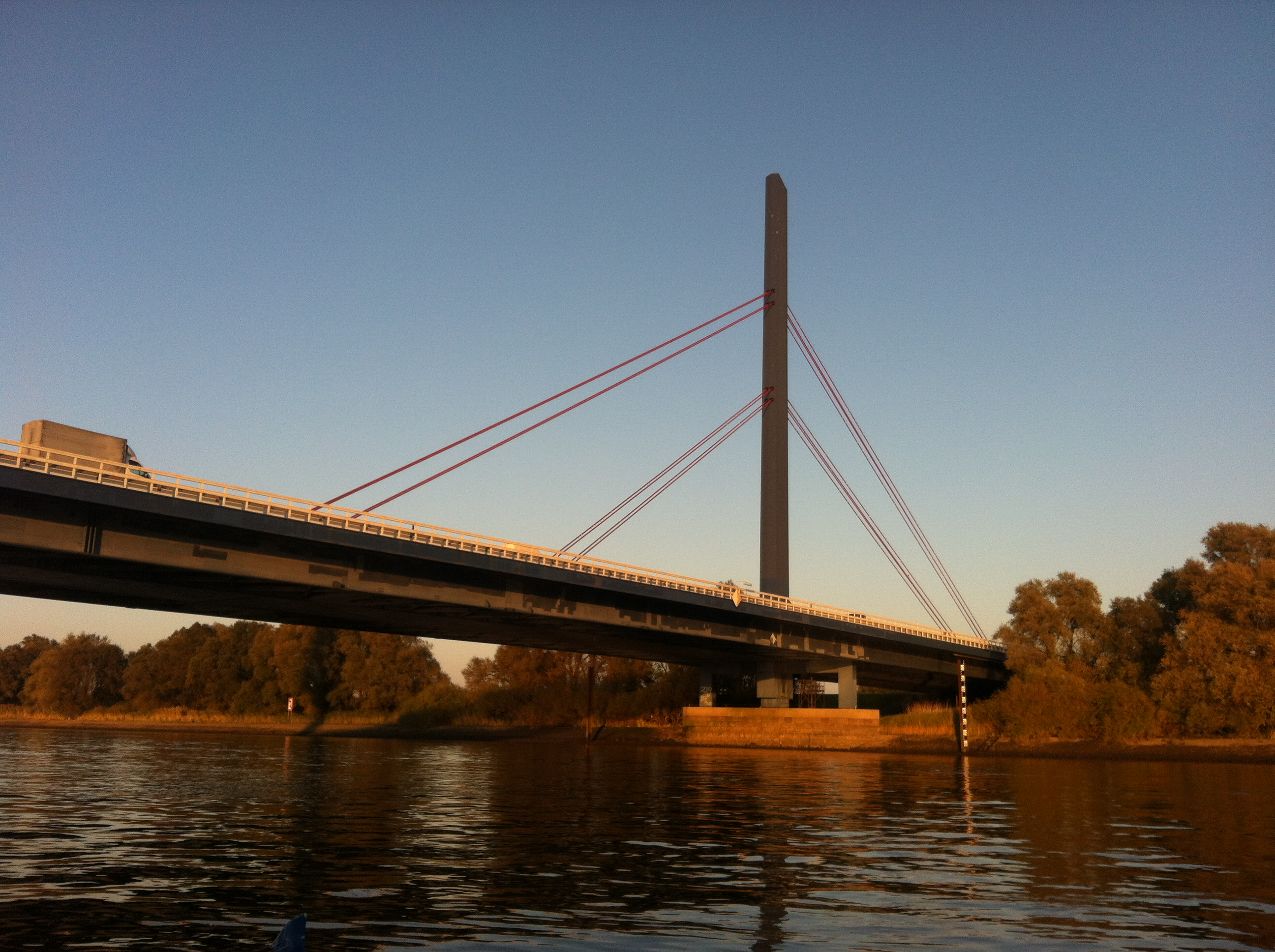
Cable-stayed bridge at Norderelbe

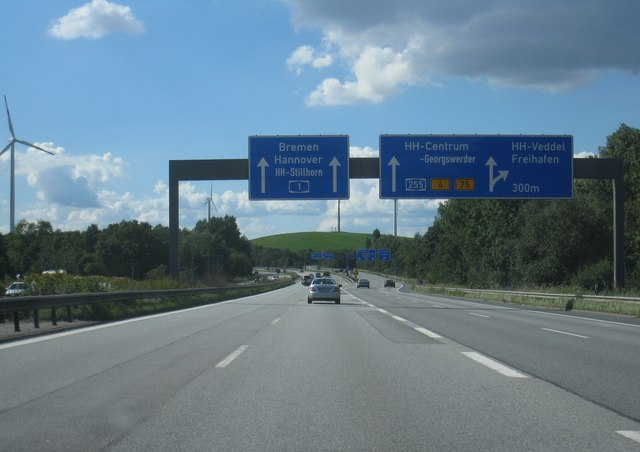
Kreuz Hamburg Süd

=== Lower Saxony and Bremen ===
Before Bremen, once it crosses through the largely flat and sparsely populated land and is consistently six lanes. At the Bremer Kreuz, which lies however on Lower Saxon territory, the A 27 (Cuxhaven Walsrode) is crossed. The A 1 now connects the southern parts of Bremen. Only a few kilometers of the route are actually in the area of the Free Hanseatic City of Bremen, where the Weser is crossed. Behind Bremen, at the Dreieck Stuhr junction near Delmenhorst, the A28 branches off towards Oldenburg. It also serves as a fast route to the northern Netherlands.

Until the triangle Ahlhorner Heide, where the A 29 from the direction of Wilhelmshaven joins, the A 1 four-lane and the nature park Wildeshauser Geest is passed through. Then it goes - partly six-, partly four-lane - back south towards Osnabrück. At Neuenkirchen-Vörden the first foothills of the low mountain ranges are passed through with the Dammer mountains. At Bramsche then follows the crossing of the Wiehengebirge and Osnabrück is bypassed to the northwest. After crossing the Osnabrück branch canal, the state border with North Rhine-Westphalia is crossed three times before the A 30 (Netherlands-Bad Oeynhausen) is crossed at the Lotte / Osnabrück cross.

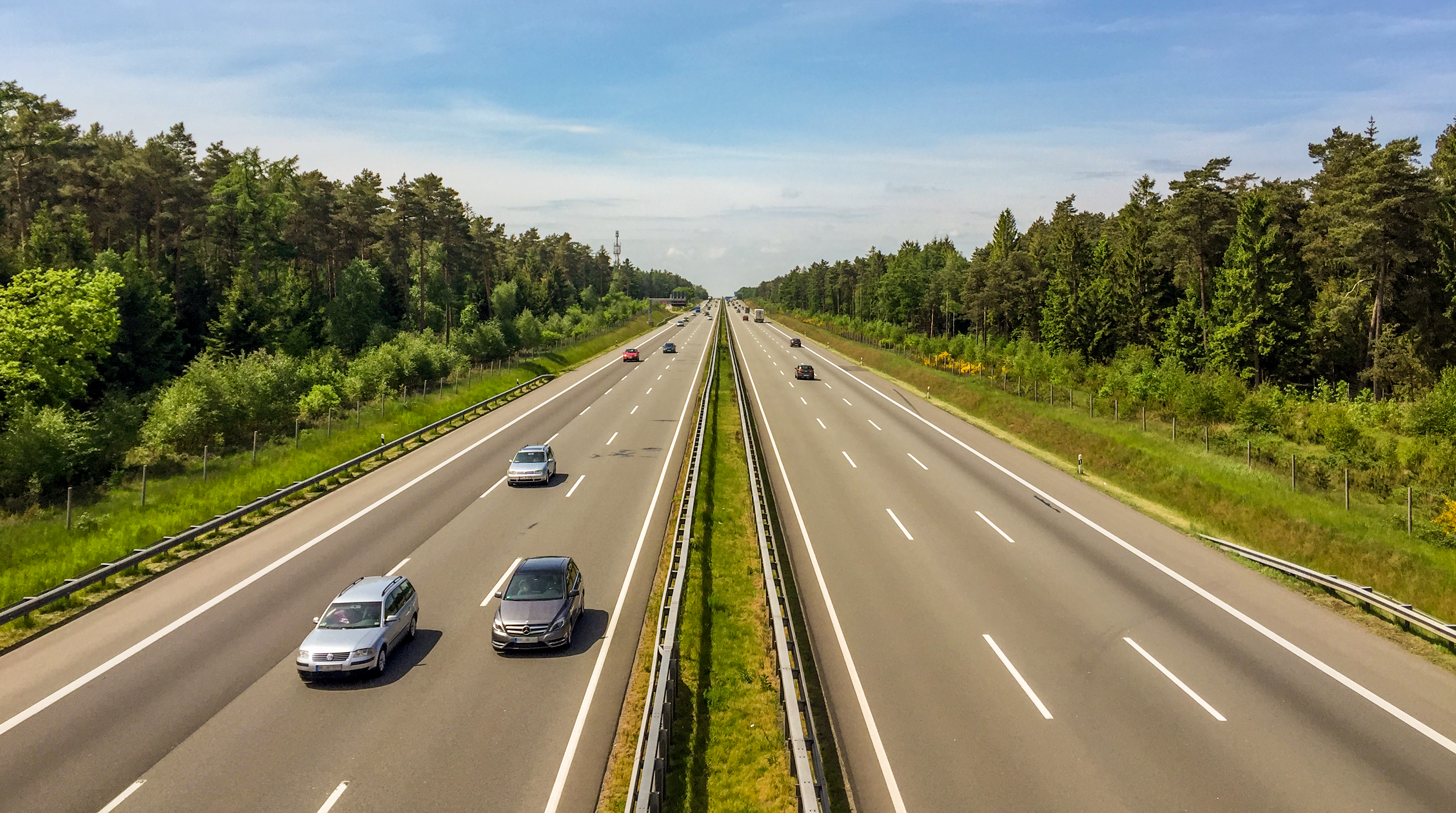
Six-carriageway from Hamburg to Bremen

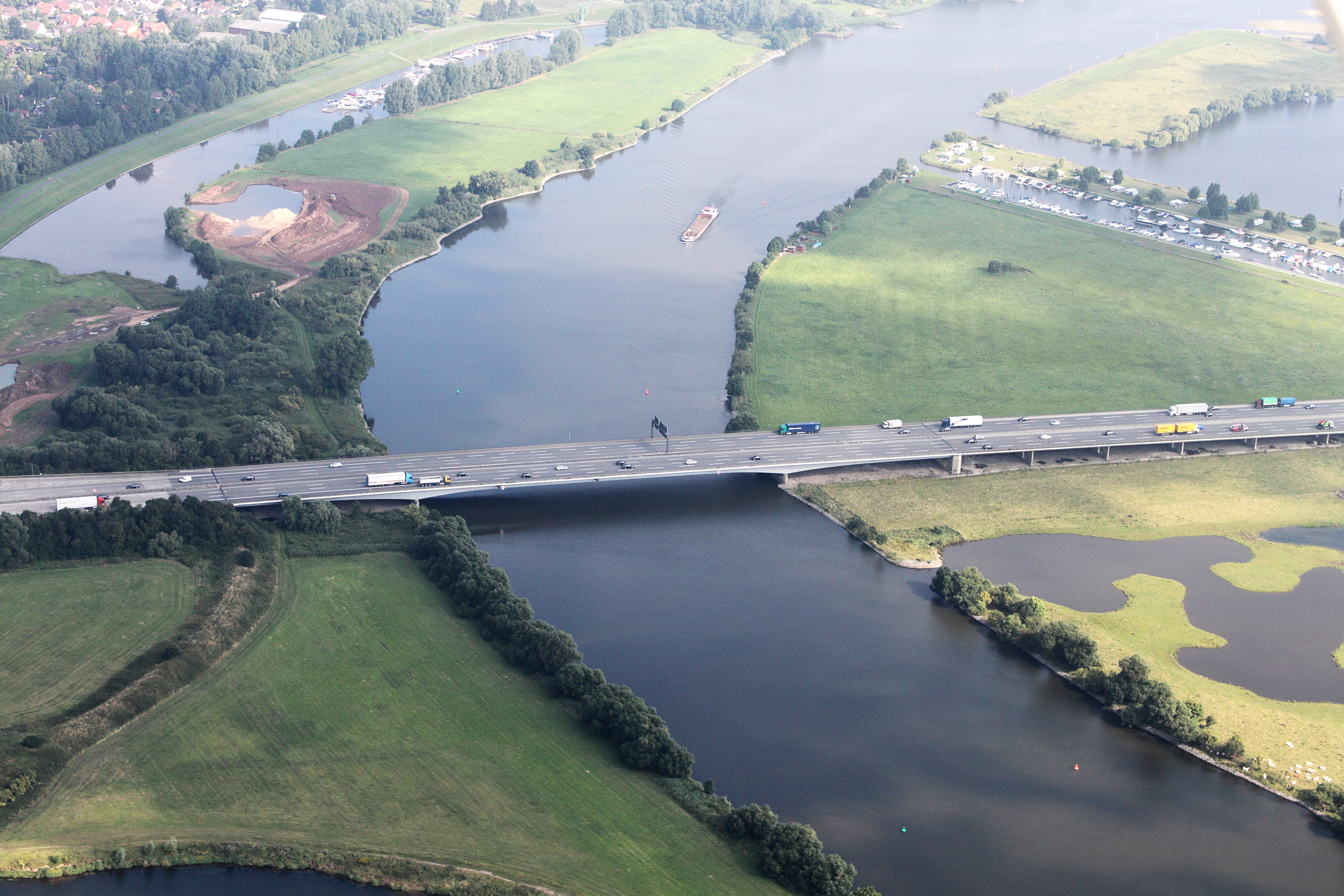
Crossing the Weser in Bremen

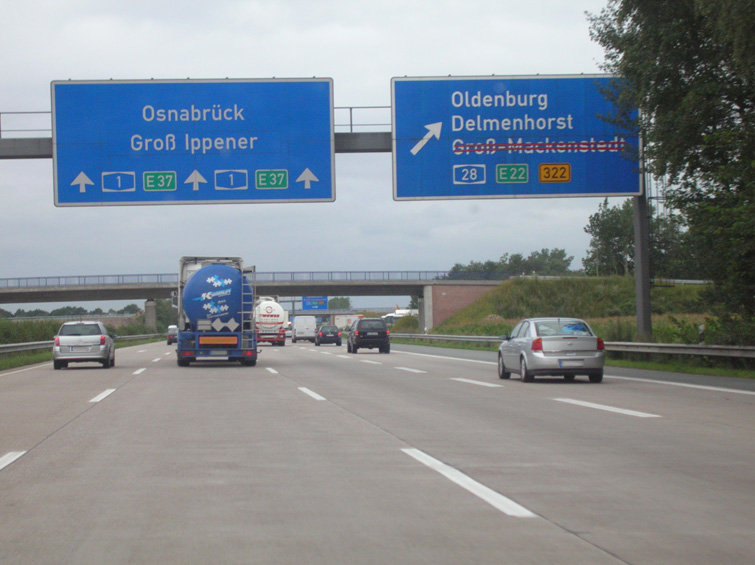
In Dreieck Stuhr near to Bremen

=== North Rhine-Westphalia ===
The southern part, where it crosses through the Teutoburg Forest in the Tecklenburg country requires unusually steep gradients and gradients. From Lengerich, the landscape becomes flatter again and a few miles later it merges into Münsterland. Münster / Osnabrück Airport is located directly on the A 1 and has its own connection point since 2010. After the six-lane bypass of Münster, the A 43 branches off at the Münster-Süd intersection into the northern Ruhr area. Further south, the A 2 (Oberhausen-Hannover-Berlin) crosses at Hamm on Kamener Kreuz; The A 1 will now six lanes to Cologne and crosses a few kilometers further at Unna the A 44 (Dortmund-Kassel). After connecting Dortmund's suburb of Schwerte, the A 45 will cross to Frankfurt am Main on the Westhofener Kreuz and the A 1 will pass Hagen. Shortly before Wuppertal, the A 43 and the A 46 are connected to Düsseldorf on the Wuppertal-Nord cross. In now southwestern direction it goes through the hilly Bergische Land past the cities of Wuppertal and Remscheid, where the carriageways in the Blombachtal partly run separately, before starting from the cross Leverkusen with the cross with the A 3 (Emmerich-Frankfurt am Main-Passau) A 1 forms the northern and western part of the motorway ring around Cologne. After crossing Leverkusen-West (A 59 to Düsseldorf), the motorway crosses the Rhine on a large cable-stayed bridge, passes the Ford plant in Cologne-Niehl and crosses the A 57 (Goch-Krefeld-Cologne) at the junction Köln-Nord. After the change of direction to the south of the Cologne district Lövenich is traversed in a 1.5 km long noise protection housing and leave at the cross Cologne West with the A 4 (Aachen-Cologne-Olpe) the Cologne Ring again.

Again four-lane now begins the section called Eifelautobahn. First, the Ville, a densely wooded ridge southwest of Cologne, is crossed, before joining the A 61 from the direction Venlo at the triangle Erfttal. Until the cross Bliesheim in Brühl the A 1 runs with the A 61 on a common, six-lane developed track. After leaving this one crosses the level of Jülich-Zülpicher Börde, bypasses Euskirchen and then rises in the Eifel. At the connection point Blankenheim the provisional end of the northern part of the motorway is reached. The gap closure through the Eifel to Kelberg is in the planning phase.

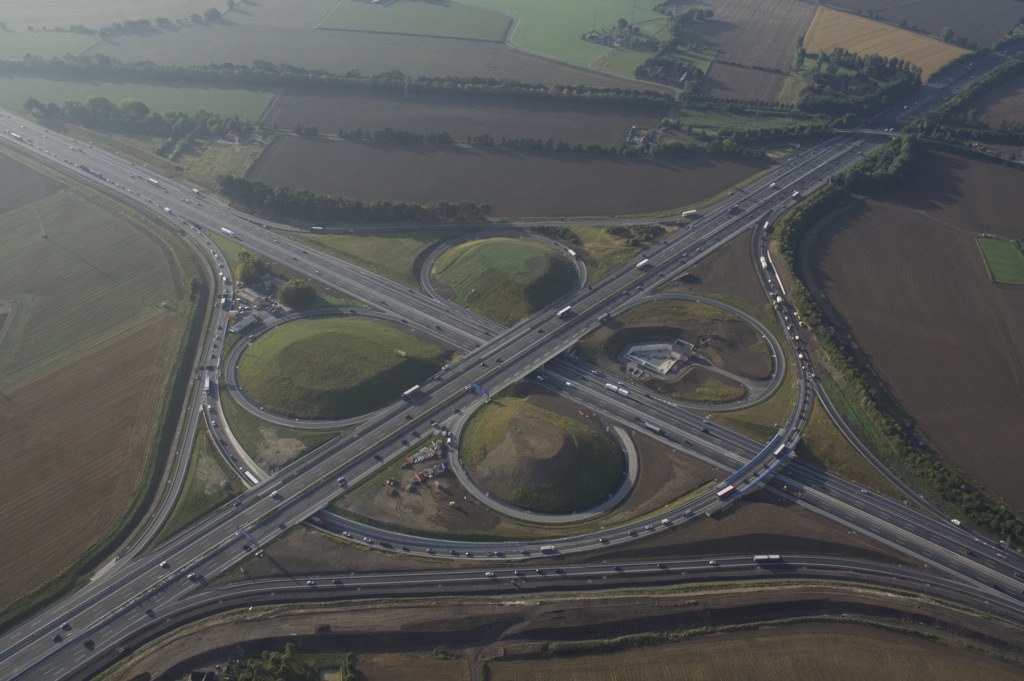
Kamener Kreuz (2009)

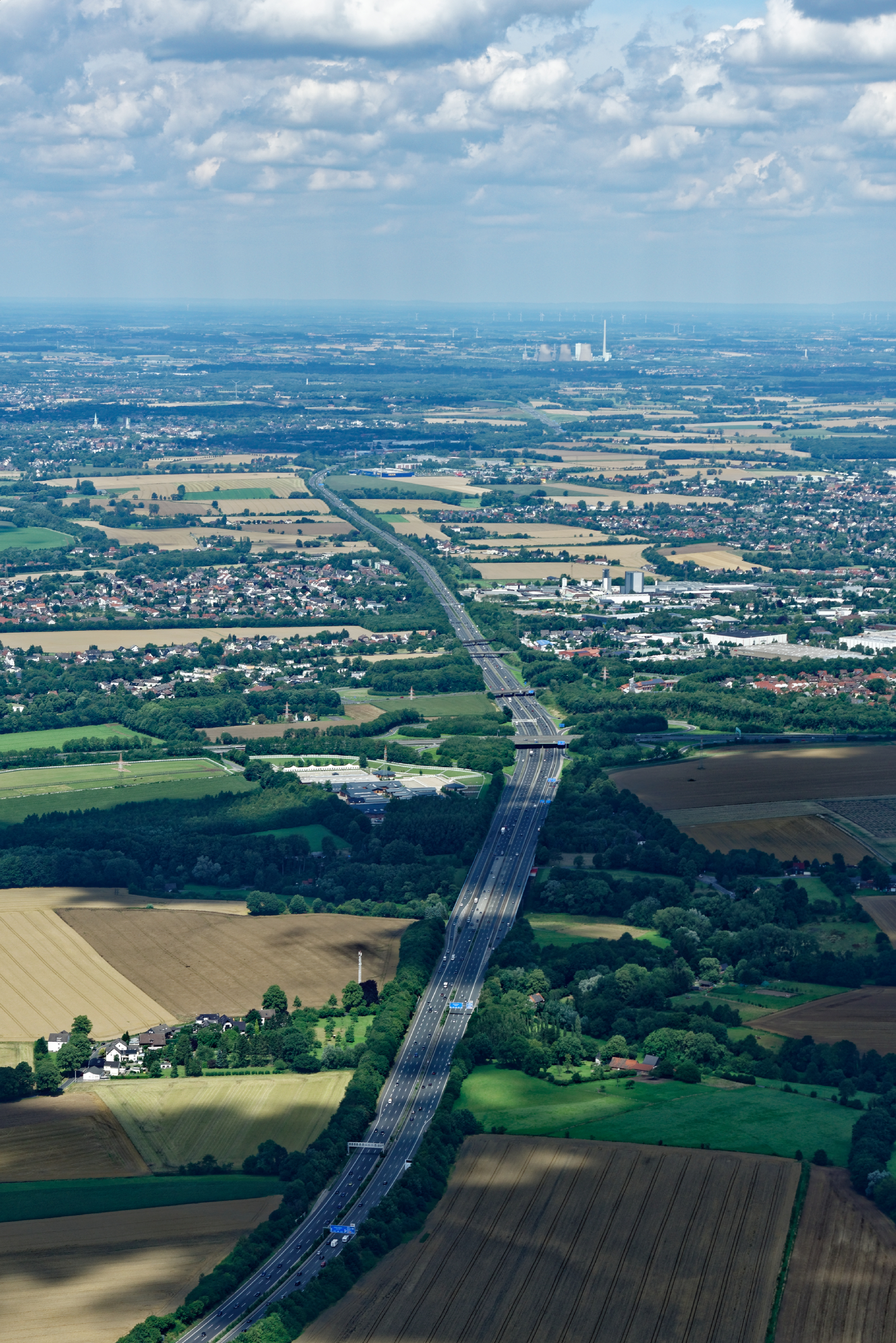
The stretch east of Dortmund

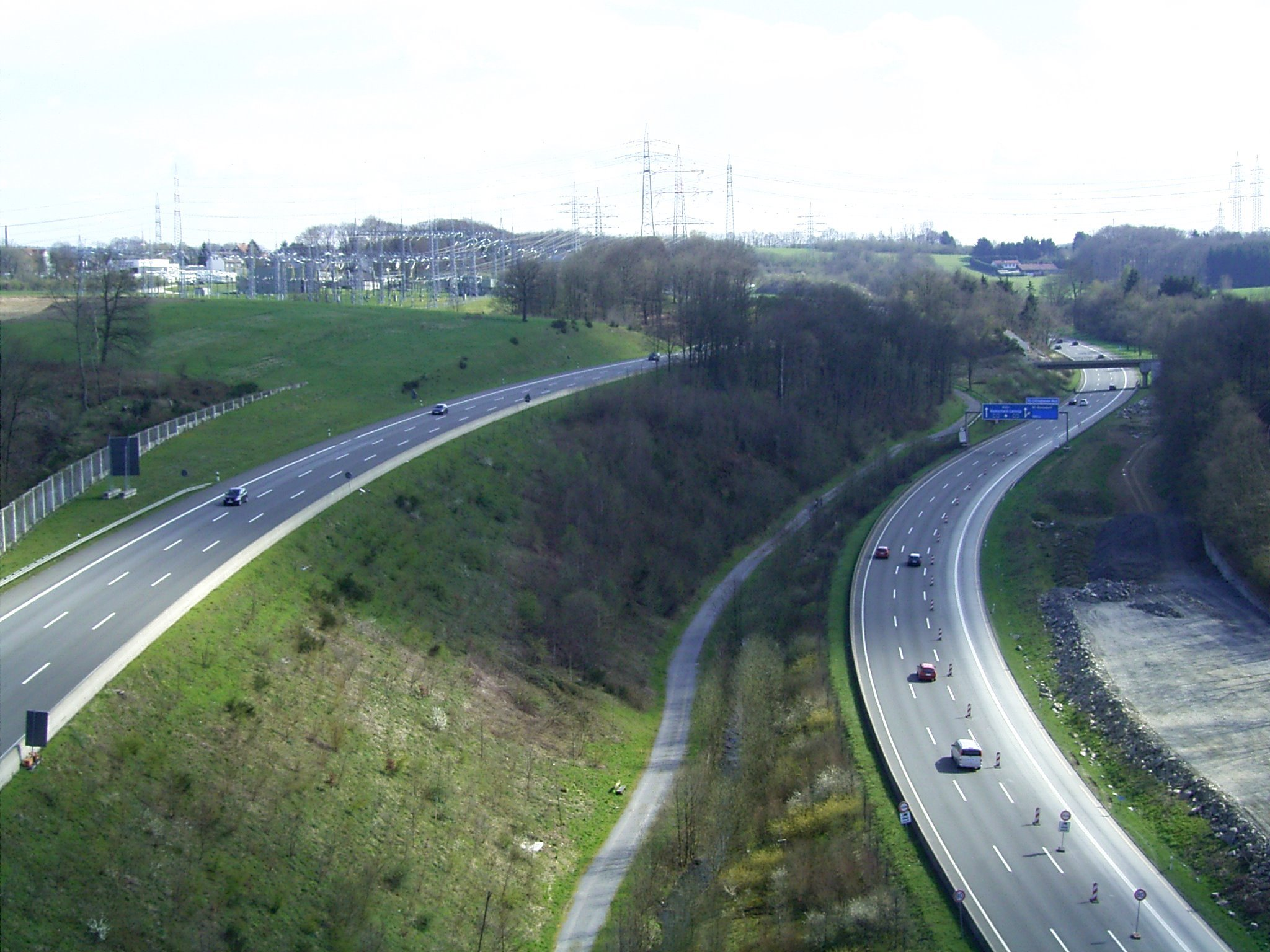
In Blombachtal at Wuppertal-Ronsdorf

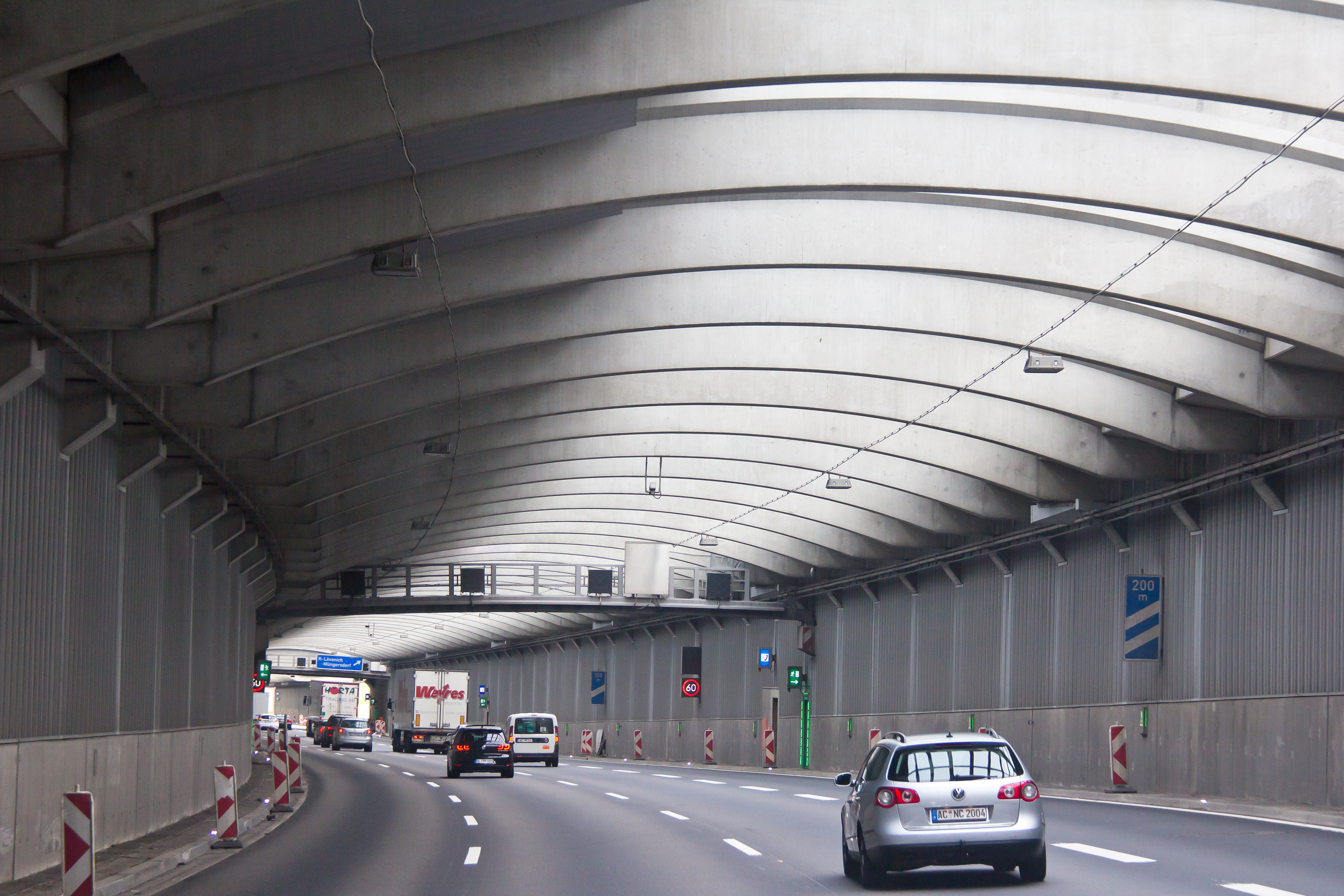
The noise barriers

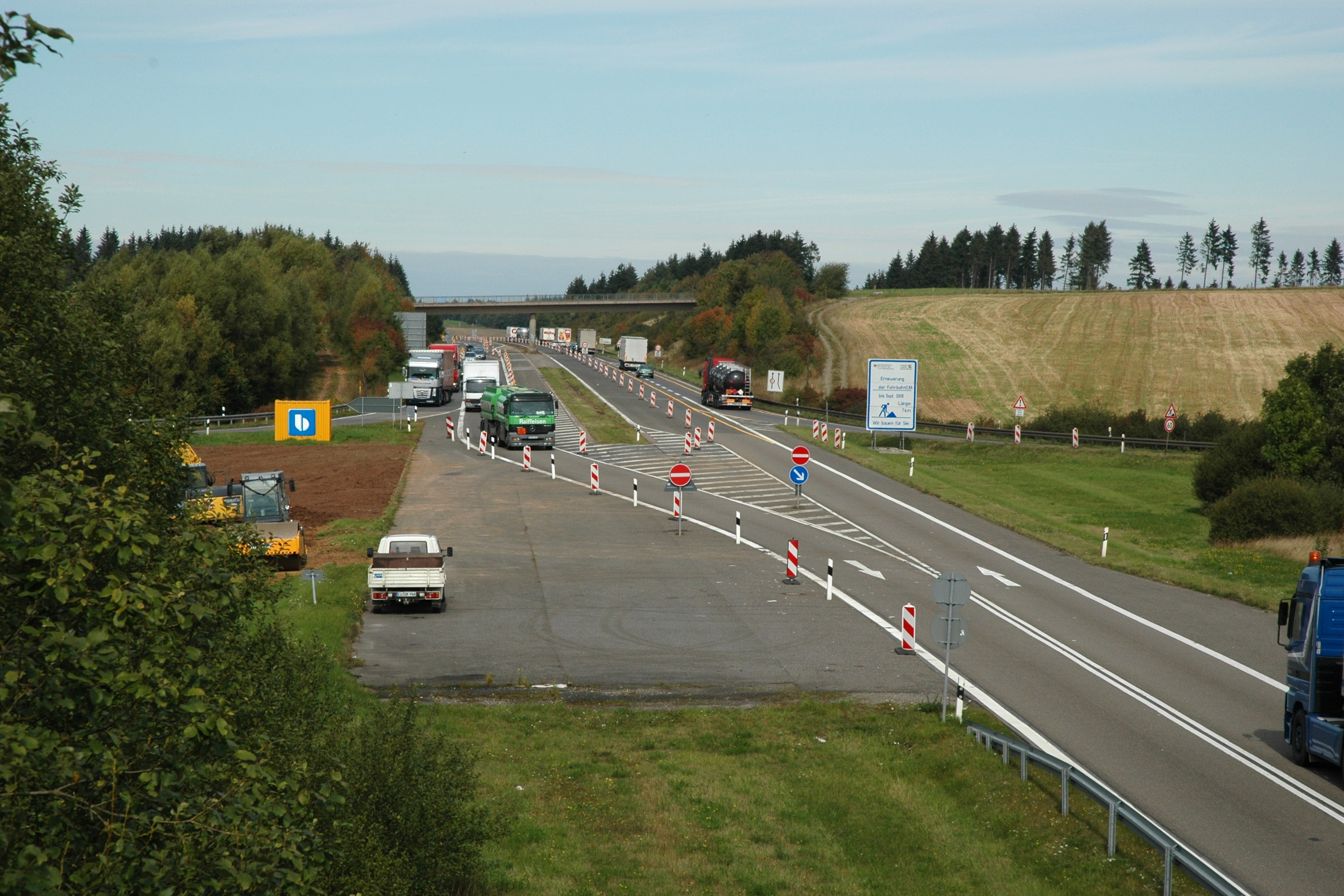
The expressway ends at Blankenheim

=== Rhineland Palatinate and Saarland ===
Beyond the state border with Rhineland-Palatinate, the A 1 starts again at the junction Kelberg. A few kilometers further, on the Vulkaneifel triangle near Daun, the A48 starts to Koblenz. At Wittlich the motorway exits the Eifel and connects the A 60 to Belgium. The four-lane federal road 50 developed route towards the Rhine-Main area (Hochmoselübergang with Hochmoselbrücke) was completed at the end of 2019. At Schweich the Moselle is crossed and the A 602 to Trier, which also represents a connection to the A 64 to Luxembourg branches off. Then the highway climbs up from the Mosel valley and crosses the heights of the Hunsrück. On the other side of the Saarland border, at the Nonnweiler junction, one must leave the main carriageway to continue on the A 1, as the continuous route forms the A 62 towards Pirmasens.

The last section of the A 1 to Saarbrücken is characterized by numerous curves, with which the Saar-Nahe-Bergland is crossed. At Illingen, the A 8 (Luxembourg-Pirmasens) crosses the Saarbrücken cross, the A 1 crosses the Saarkohlenwald and ends at the junction Saarbrücken-Burbach (150) in the development area of the Saarbrücken district Malstatt. The adjoining B 268 continues to the city center of the Saarland state capital.

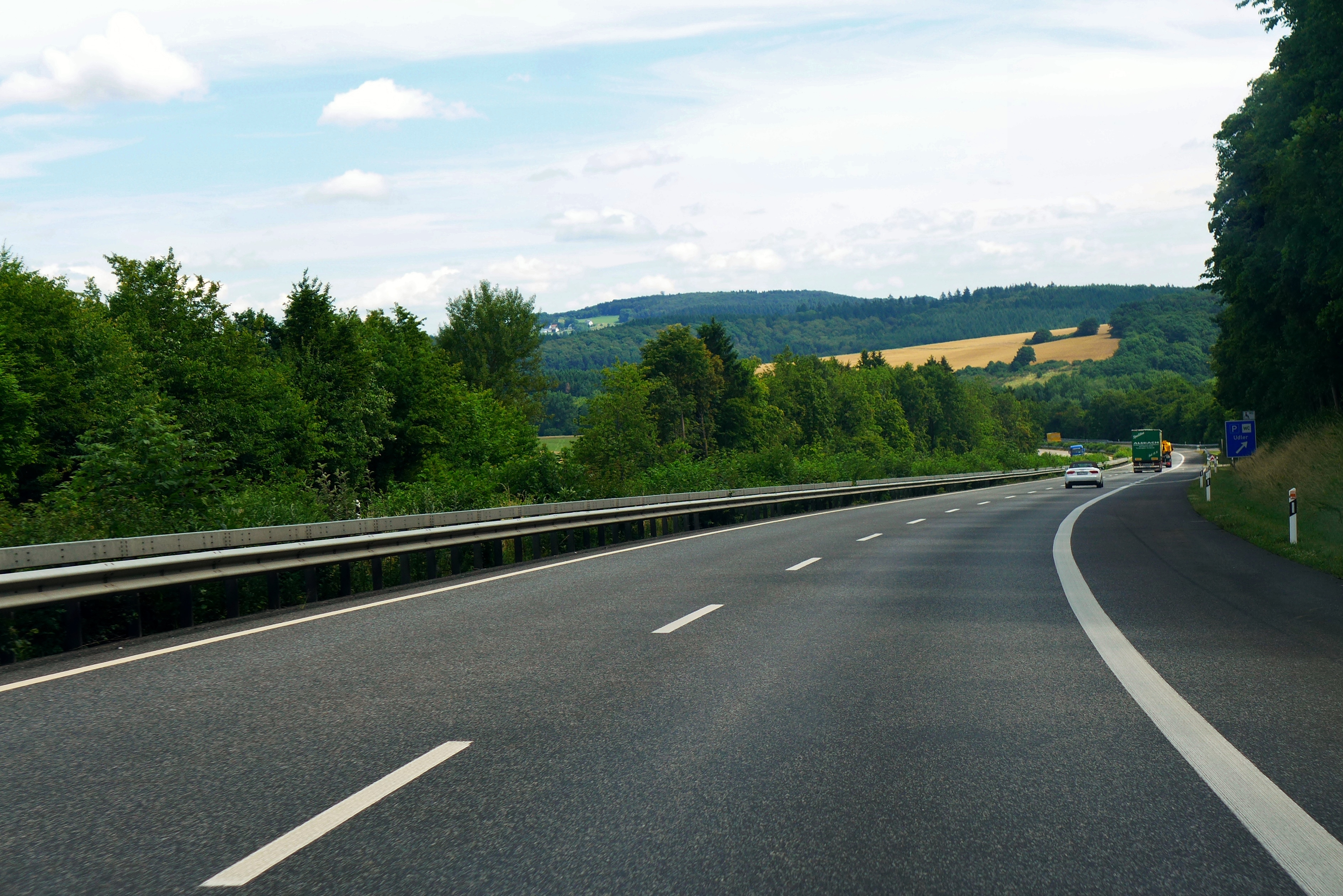
In the Eifel, north of Wittlich

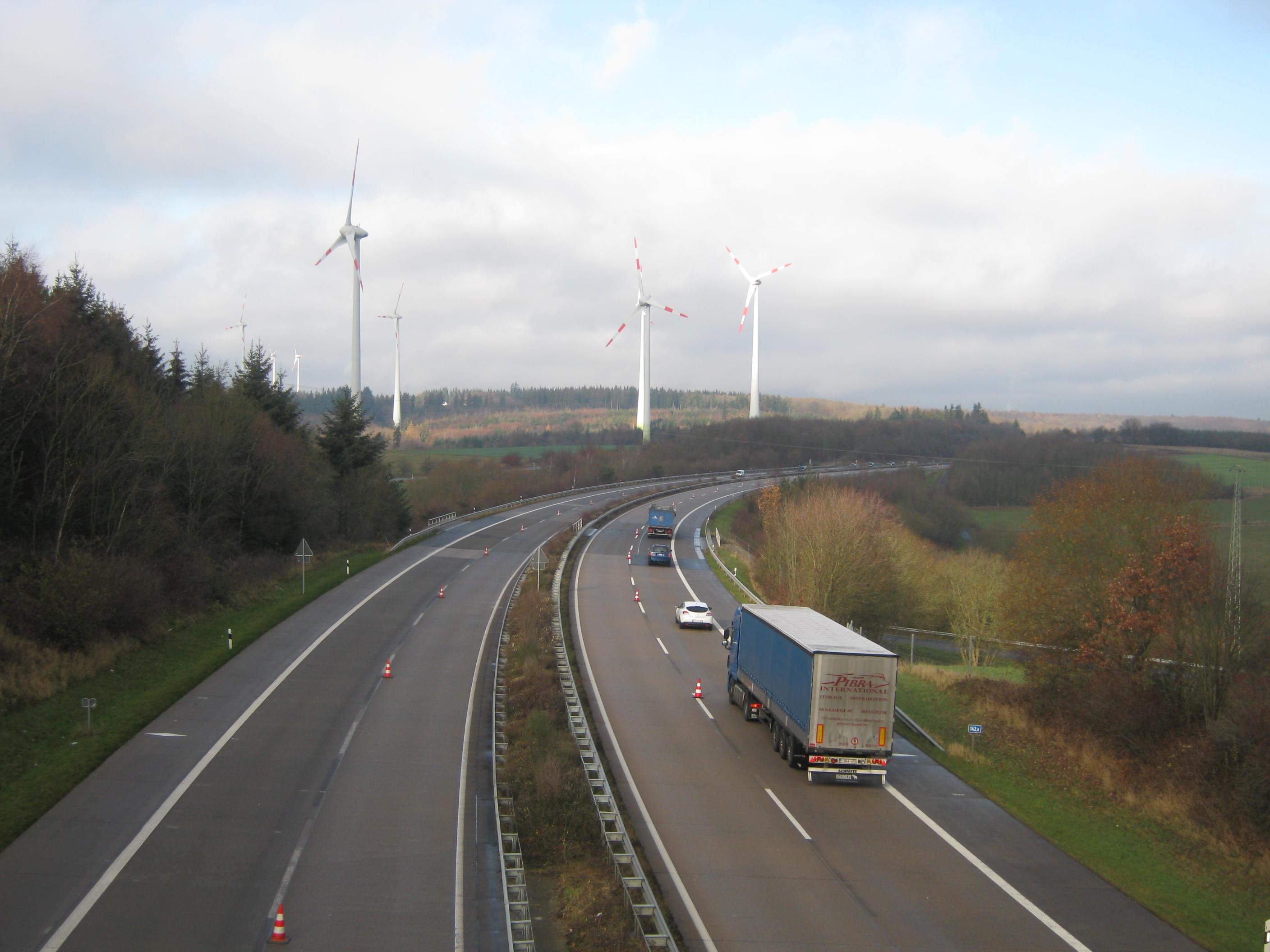
Eastern part of Trier

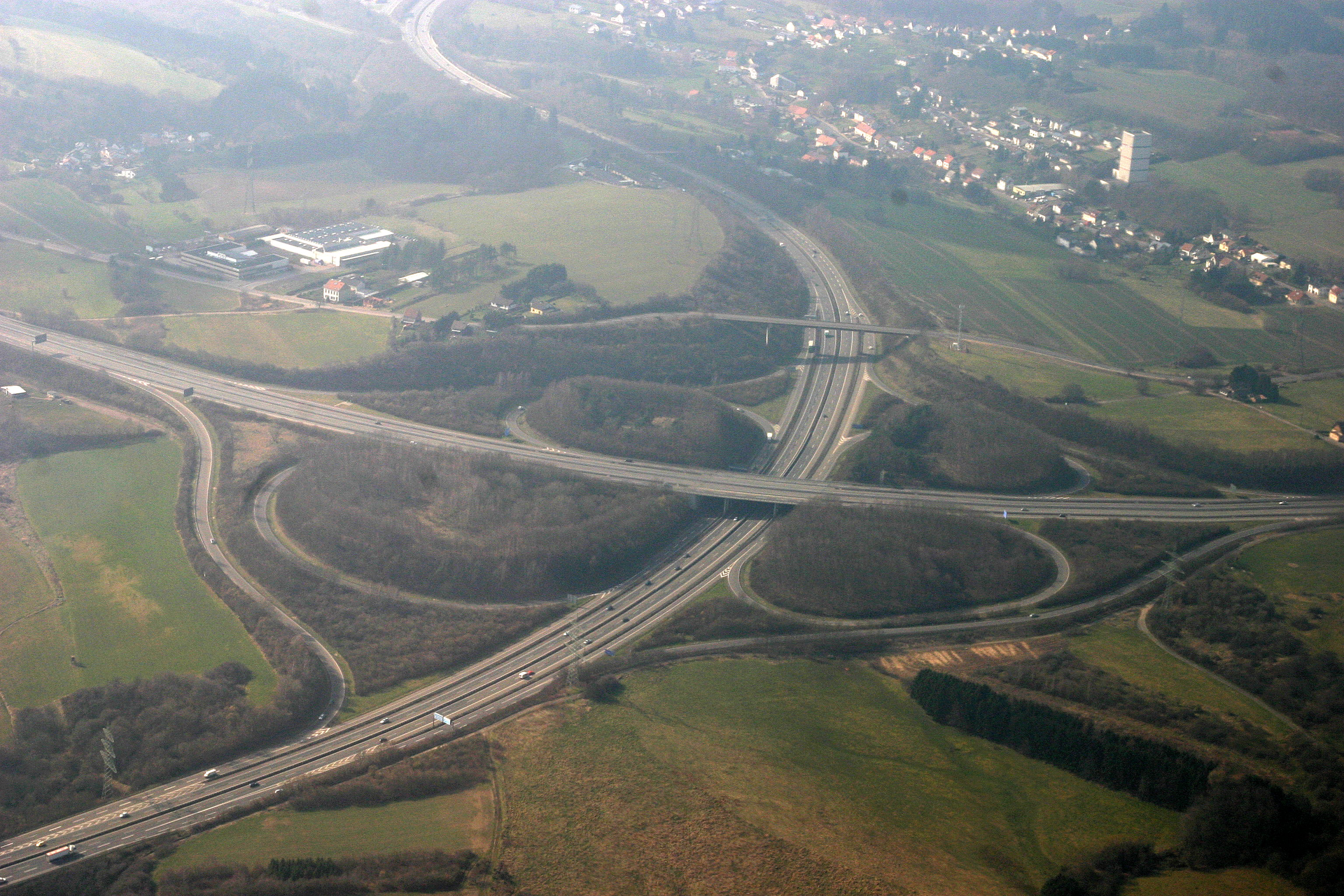
Das Autobahnkreuz Saarbrücken

== Congestion and speed limits ==
The road has either two or three lanes each way. Congestion is possible around Hamburg, during holiday periods between Hamburg and Münster, between Dortmund and Cologne because of roadworks and especially around Cologne. During the rush hour the Cologne Beltway (junctions 98–104) is very busy (AADT 100,000-120,000). It is three lanes each way. The speed limit on the Cologne Beltway is mostly 100 km/h. Northbound between junctions 103 and 102 as well as between 101 and 100 the speed limit has recently been raised to 120 km/h.

South of the Cologne Beltway the A1 has two lanes each way between junctions 104 and 107. There is a speed limit of 120 km/h northbound between junctions 105 and 104, otherwise this section has no speed limit. Between junction 107 and 109 the A1 and A61 run concurrently. The motorway has three lanes each way and a variable speed limit here.

Overall most of the A1 has no speed limit.

== European Roads ==
- E47: Heiligenhafen – Autobahnkreuz Lübeck
- E22: Autobahnkreuz Lübeck – Autobahndreieck Stuhr
- E37: Autobahndreieck Stuhr – Autobahnkreuz Köln-Nord
- E31: Autobahnkreuz Köln-Nord – Autobahnkreuz Bliesheim
- E29: Autobahnkreuz Bliesheim – Blankenheim/Tondorf
- E44: Autobahndreieck Vulkaneifel – Autobahndreieck Moseltal
- E422: Autobahndreieck Moseltal – Saarbrücken-Malstatt

== History ==
The A 1 and A 2 were first planned in the 1920s. The interchange between the two (Kamener Kreuz) was one of the first cloverleaf interchanges in Germany, opened in 1937.

=== 1930s ===
The groundbreaking ceremony for the construction work on the section between Hamburg and Bremen was completed on 21 March 1934 at Oyten. After just two years, on 25 July 1936, the 71-kilometer section between the Dibbersen and Oyten junctions could be opened to traffic as part of a propaganda event. The construction of this route was done entirely without the use of heavy equipment, instead, many unemployed were forced into compulsory work service. 1937, the section between the junction Oyten and the Bremen Cross and the subsequent part of today's A 27 to Bremen Burglesum was completed. Hamburg (or the former Harburg-Wilhelmsburg) was connected from the south in 1939 by the construction of a motorway bridge over the Süderelbe.

On 13 May 1937 the motorway from Hamburg-Ost to Lübeck was opened to traffic. It began at Horner Kreisel in Hamburg-Horn (today the western terminus of the A 24) and led to the junction Lübeck-Zentrum. One year later, on 1 May 1938, the continuation of the route to Lübeck-Siems was released (today A 226). After the occupation of Denmark in the Second World War, a bridge connection over the Fehmarnsund (bird's flight line) and an extension of the Reichsautobahn to Copenhagen was planned. Earthworks and bridge work on the island of Lolland to Guldborgsund had begun in September 1941. This section is now in operation as E 47.

Northeast of Dortmund, the Kamener Cross, the second German interchange in shamrock version, was built in the course of the A 2 in the late 1930s. The first cross of this kind in Germany was the 1936 approved for traffic Schkeuditzer Cross (A 9 / A 14) near Leipzig. However, it was completely passable only after the Second World War, because the earthworks already underway on the A 1 were resting in the area of the cross due to the war.

Until 1939, the first 25 kilometers from the cross Leverkusen to the northeast to the junction Wermelskirchen / Castle Burg were under traffic. The construction of the section to Remscheid with several engineering structures had to be interrupted because of the Second World War from 1942 to 1951.

Even in the Eifel area was started before the Second World War with the highway. Before the war-related cessation of construction, however, only a short section in the area Hasborn could be completed one-lane. The already planned construction of the line between Bremen and Osnabrück in 1939 could not take place because of the outbreak of World War II. This was completed in the 1950s and 1960s.

=== 1970s ===
Just as the motorways north of the exit Lübeck Zentrum today show, they exist essentially since 1975, when the A 1 direction Neustadt / Holstein was extended. At that time, the motorways in this area were thoroughly renewed: The 2 × 2 lane highway then came from the direction of Hamburg only until today's exit Lübeck center. Here, the highway crossed the Stockelsdorfer road. Today, the highway leads over it; this conversion took place around 1983. North of the exit Lübeck (with this name the departure was opened 1937, later it was called Lübeck middle) ran the lanes to three strips of altogether 17 meters width (with side banquets) together. A structural separation did not exist. The middle lane was intended for overtaking for both directions.

The old route was in today's 6-lane route. About 500 meters south of the Schwartauer Dreiecks (approximately where the right lane becomes the turning strip), the old three-lane route deviated to the east and henceforth ran about 130 meters parallel to today's route. An approximately 160-meter-long section of this original route is still preserved in a forest near Elisabethstraße in Bad Schwartau.

At the point where today the junction of the motorway towards Fehmarn and Lübeck-Siems (A 226) is located, was formerly a motorway junction as a left-hand trumpet, which - in contrast to today - was navigable in each direction. This triangle was still referred to as Eutiner branch in the 1950s. The continuous route led north towards Ratekau on the route of today's L 181 between the L 309 and the junction Sereetz the A 1. Also this stretch was three-lane with middle passing stripes. After about 1500 meters, the highway ended at a triangular junction south of Ratekau, where the route in the highway (today's L 309, then B 207) ended and found its end. This threading was officially called Eutin as a motorway junction, which at that time was not a geographical, but a pure direction determination.

When the A 1 was extended in the early 1970s towards Neustadt, the Ratekauer branch line was cut off from the motorway network and downgraded to the national road. Until the 1990s, this section of the motorway was preserved in its original state. Thereafter, the road was extensively repaired.

=== Bridge ===
Noteworthy is the crossing of the bridge Schwartauer road: The bridge is still an original building and therefore as a motorway bridge wider than necessary today. The branch line to Lübeck-Siems (today's A 226) has nothing in common with the former Reichsautobahn except its start- and end-points. These building constructs were by no means intended as provisional in the 1930s, but it was thought even in the future a full expansion would not be necessary due to the lower expected traffic.

In 1963, the motorway routes Hamburg-Bremen and Hamburg-Lübeck were connected by a 13 km long southeast bypass around Hamburg. The centerpiece here is the Norderelbe bridge at Moorfleet, which was designed as a cable-stayed bridge.

The already planned in the highway network of 1933 and planned before the war route extension between Bremen and the Ruhr area (Hansalinie) could not be executed. In this area, the plans were resumed until the late 1950s. The lines of the new federal highway was determined in 1958 for the section Bremer Kreuz-Delmenhorst, 1959 for the section Kamen-Lotte and finally in 1962 for the intermediate section Delmenhorst-Lotte. The total length of this route is 214 km. The route was influenced by the accessibility of the northern German seaports of Lübeck, Bremen and Hamburg from the Ruhr area as well as possible connections of the somewhat remote economic areas of Oldenburg and Ostfriesland with the seaports of Brake, Wilhelmshaven and Emden to the line. It was decided to line from Bremen first in the southeast and then south. The crossing of the Wildeshauser Geest required the consideration of numerous existing cultural monuments. The mountain ranges Dammer mountains and Wiehengebirge had to be crossed at topographisch favorable places. Something similar had to be taken into account when crossing the Teutoburg Forest south of Osnabrück, but the motorway still has a height difference of about 100 m on a relatively short section.

In the Münster area, there was a considerable deviation from the pre-war planning: If the plans of 1933 still seemed to affect Münster to the east, the decision was now made to bypass the city to the west. As a result, the federal highways 219, 54 and 51, leading in the direction of the city, could all be connected to the motorway. While in the plans of 1933 a highway from the Gladbeck area was to cross the later A 1 north of Münster, this motorway connection was realized as A 43 in the 1970s and 1980s and connected to the A 1 southwest of Münster.

=== South section ===
The section south of Münster to the connection to the Kamen Cross required in the area of the crossing of the Lippe and Datteln-Hamm-channel an increase of the roadway to absorb possible subsidence, which occurred at times of mining in the Ruhr area again and again. The Werne colliery was located in the immediate vicinity of the motorway Werner district Stockum.

The section Bremen-Bremen / Brinkum 1963 was opened to traffic, a year later, in 1964, the sequel to Delmenhorst. In 1965, a section at Wildeshausen and the section from Münster to the Kamener Cross was completed. 1966 was the highway after release of two further sections west and east of Wildeshausen from Bremen already to Cloppenburg consistently passable, 1967 to Holdorf. The complete gap closure to Münster was completed in 1968.

The section between the Kamen Cross and the cross Dortmund / Unna was completed in 1957. The already started before the war section Wermelskirchen-Remscheid by the Bergisches Land was further built from 1951 and was handed over to the operation on 15 July 1953. Hagen was reached in 1956. In 1961, finally, the gap of the motorway on this section between Dortmund / Unna and Hagen was closed. This section of the motorway is also called Ruhrtangente.

=== Northern part ===
The northern part of the Cologne motorway ring was planned as 17.8 km long northern bypass Cologne from the 1960s to relieve the Heumarer triangle and the Rodenkirchen bridge and close the ring road around Cologne. Also here already existed in the 1930s planning for a closed motorway ring around Cologne. These were also largely implemented for the ring closure in the 1960s. The plan approval decision was issued in 1961 in three parts (left bank section, right bank section, Rhine bridge). The 1061 m long Rhine bridge Leverkusen as well as the two highways on Leverkusen city area were thereby equipped with wider side stripes to allow a later expansion to six lanes. A special feature in the German motorway network is that the highway between the cross Leverkusen and the junction Cologne-Niehl - as well as the A 3 - was equipped with street lighting in the form of a fairy lights and subsequent single lamps. In 1965, the A 1 was completely passable in this area, in 1968 with the completion of the section Holdorf-Münster then complete from Lübeck to Cologne-West.

The realization of the already planned before the war route between Daun and Saarbrücken was resumed in the 1960s, but initially as a single lane B 408th This should lead from the triangle Dernbach to Landstuhl. The section Kaisersesch-Wittlich was completed in 1965 in one lane. Due to a French ammunition warehouse at Hasborn this was initially interrupted and after clearance by the French authorities from 1 July 1968 continuously passable. After this route had been upgraded to the motorway in 1967, the second carriageway was missing for full expansion, this was completed in 1970.

=== Numbering system ===
In 1974, a new numbering system for the motorways was introduced, the previously planned A11 and internally designated route from Puttgarden to Leverkusen was along with the planned sequel to the Saarbrücken to the Federal Highway 1.

Since the 1970s, the highway from Lübeck was extended bit by bit to the north. North of Lübeck was the motorway junction Bad Schwartau in the form of a fork, from which the previously continuous connection from Hamburg to Lübeck-Siems now branches off as A 226. In 1975, the section from Bad Schwartau to Neustadt in Holstein was completed, in 1979 they reached as far as Lensahn, 1980 then Oldenburg in Holstein-South.

Also, from the 1970s, the A 1 was gradually extended towards the Eifel. As early as 1971, the short piece of the cross Cologne-West to the junction Frechen was handed over to traffic, a year later, in 1972, they reached as far as the Bliesheim Cross, where they are here as part of a motorway A 14 of the Dutch border near Goch to the French border near Lauterbourg was planned and built. Wisskirchen was reached in 1977, in 1981 Mechernich and in 1982 the current end of the autobahn at Blankenheim.

South of Wittlich, the highway was opened in 1974 between the junction Salmtal and the triangle Moselle Valley, 1975, the gap between Wittlich and Salmtal closed, making it from Koblenz to Trier continuously passable. After the introduction of the new numbering system, this highway was initially designated as A 48 and was originally intended to lead from Luxembourg via Trier, Daun, Koblenz, Wetzlar and Gießen to the Hattenbacher Dreieck. Corresponding already established sections were already provided with this number. Between Daun and Trier then a double numbering A 1 / A 48 was used, since the time at Daun a highway triangle for a subsequent route to Cologne was planned and there was some already started with the earthworks for the ramps. But these enormous masses of earth were then overgrown and unused for well over 15 years. Only in 1997, the highway triangle itself and a few kilometers A 1 was completed to the junction Daun, the rest of construction then rested but initially again.

=== Continuation ===
The continuation from Trier to Saarbrücken was tackled in the 1970s and early 1980s. First emerged in the 1970s in the context of a full expansion of 1960 and 1964 as federal highway 268 or 327 built single-lane and 1969 in A 171 umgewidmeten track sections Saarbrücken-Riegelsberg and Illingen-Eppelborn. Originally, this federal road should continue to Hermeskeil and meet there on the B 408 Koblenz-Trier-Landstuhl. In the plans from the 1930s, a Tangierung the Saarland latter was not provided, the realized planning with the triangle Nonnweiler therefore deviates significantly from the pre-war planning.

The section Riegelsberg-Saarbrücken, was indeed developed in 1960 as a federal highway four lanes, but originally had no structural separation, which accidents due to wetness on the winding route were common. A central plank was therefore only retrofitted in the course of the upgrade. This explains the unusually narrow profile of the motorway in this area, which also does not have streaks here.

Coming to the end of the 1970s, the A 1 between Saarbrücken and Reinsfeld was completed in sections, was missing only the gap between the Reinsfeld and the triangle Moselle valley. This 20 km long track with two larger bridge structures (Fellerbach and Molesbachtal bridge) was completed in 1983, making the A 1 between Daun and Saarbrücken completely passable.

=== Reunification ===
With the German reunification, it had accounted for the double numbering between the triangle Vulkaneifel and Trier. Since the section Dernbach-Wetzlar, A 48 should not be realized, the name of this was reduced to the route triangle Vulkaneifel-triangle Dernbach. The already built piece northwest of Trier to the Luxembourg border was renamed A 64, as well as the already finished sections in Hessen received new numbers (A 480 and A 5). On some older signposts, however, this double numbering still exists.

=== 2000s ===
In the early 2000s, both the continuation from Oldenberg in Holstein to the north and the gap closure in the Eifel between Blankenheim and Daun were planned and partially realized. On 20 December 2002 the section from the former motorway south to north of Oldenberg in Holstein was cleared by the construction of second carriageway. As part of the completion of second carriageway, was the previous B 207 on 21 August 2005 to Gremersdorf upgraded to the highway. Since 25 August 2008, the A 1 ended at the junction Heiligenhafen-Mitte. The 3.5 km section from Heiligenhafen-Mitte to behind Heiligenhafen-Ost was opened to the rest on 6 July 2012.

The A 1 had to be closed in from 26 July 2006 to 1 August 2006, between the Hagen-West and Westhofener Cross in the direction of Bremen, because of serious heat damage. In the construction site area, the road surface became soft and ruts arose. The 30-year-old pavement has not been able to withstand the one-sided exposure to persistently high temperatures. In this refurbished section, the entire road surface was milled out and re-asphalted.

The closing of the gap in the Eifel region was continued from the Rhineland-Palatinate side. In 2005, the highway was even extended by 2.5 km north of Daun to the makeshift port at Rengen. This disappeared in October 2010, when the A 1 was extended by another 3.5 km to the junction of Gerolstein. The most recent extension was on 31 May 2012, when 2.5 km continuation of the expressway were realized to the junction of Kelberg. The complete closing of the gap has not yet been realized due to faltering planning due to environmental guidelines.

=== New construction ===
There were still some new construction points: as part of the six-lane expansion from Hamburg to Bremen, the new junction Elsdorf was created. At the end of 2010, the junction for the airport Münster / Osnabruck (Exit 75) was released. At the same time as construction, the motorway in the area of the new connection point has already been dimensioned for the future six-lane expansion. Another new junction was built south of the intersection Münster-Süd in the course of six-lane expansion in 2014. It bears the name Münster-Hiltrup (Exit 79A).

== Features ==
The A 1 has at the junction of Saarbrücken-Von de Heydt (exit 148) in the direction of Trier, a bus stop for the two parts, Saarbrücken Cherschheck and Von der Heydt. Today, the bus stop is only used for rail replacement traffic of the parallel city railway line 1, of the Saarbahn, which has a stop there for both Saarbrücken districts beside the motorway ramp, and the call collection exit 168, Von der Heydt to Heinrichshaus. Also at the junction Saarbrücken -Burbach (150), the end point of the A 1, was until 2001, a bus stop. In the course of the further expansion of the Saarbahn, which was cancelled out due to lack of space in favour of Siedlerheim stop, which is about 750m away from the city center.

To commemorate the prisoners of the war who built the highway during the Nazi period from 1939 to 1942, for the further construction of Reichsautobahn, on 27 January 2013, the day of the commemoration of the victims of National Socialism (anniversary of the liberation of the concentration camp Auschwitz 1945) Memorial at the motorway church St. Paul in Wittlich inaugurated. It consists of two stainless steel panels, which are attached to the outer wall of the church. They are connected by a stylized highway, which turns into a barbed-wire symbolizing and blood-red colored branching at the end. The forced laborers were inmates of the Wittlich Prison, the Hinzert concentration camp and its satellite camps, as well as people of Jewish religion in Luxembourg and prisoners of war and forced laborers from Poland and the Soviet Union.

The section between exit 140 (Thorley) and exit 141 (Eppelborn), the highway was upgraded to three-lanes due to an incline. It divides here in such a way that the two left stripes on the left lead past a bridge pier and the right strip on the right.

At the gap in the Eifel is still not closed, is displayed on the A 1 from Saarbrücken in northern direction as the long-haul destination Cologne. The bypass of the gap is signposted from the triangle Vulkaneifel on the A 48 to the cross Koblenz, then from there on the A 61, which meets again in a northerly direction on the A 1. Alternatively, the A 48 can already leave in Mayen and be reached via the B 262, a two- to four-lane motor road, the Mendig junction of the A 61. Another heavily used alternative route leads from the Wittlich intersection on the A 60 to Prüm and from there through the Westeifel on the B 51 to Blankenheim, where the A 1 starts again. In southern direction, the latter route is labeled from the cross Bliesheim with the long-term destination Trier.

Several junctions of the highway were renamed after its opening. In North Rhine-Westphalia in particular, new regulations have been created in recent years, which introduced new guidelines for naming motorway junctions. So called the junction Gleuel (105) earlier Hürth and today Hürth (106) hot, south following Junction Knapsack. Some junctions formerly had double designations, such as Lengerich / Tecklenburg (now Lengerich, 73), Castle Burg / Wermelskirchen (now Wermelskirchen, 96), Bad Münstereifel / Mechernich (now Mechernich, 112) or Daun / Mehren (today Mehren, 121). According to RWBA 2000, such double designations are no longer permitted for newly established connection points.

At Wuppertal-Ronsdorf the directional carriageway of the A 1 was divided in the course of the six-lane extension in Blombachtal for about one kilometer. This is in Germany only on the A2 at Bad Oeynhausen, on two sections of the A7 between Hamburg and Hanover, the Albaufstieg on the A8 and the A9 in the Altmühltal and Hienberg the case.

== Projects ==
The A 1 is currently four-lane passable. Several stretches are also being upgraded to six-lanes.

The section from Kreuz Lübeck towards Maschener Kreuz is being widened to six-lane configuration. From Autobahnkreuz Hamburg-Ost to Autobahnkreuz Hamburg-Süd is only two-lane configuration. Since October 2012, six lanes have been available between the Buchholzer Triangle and the Bremer Kreuz. From the Bremer Kreuz to the Dreieck Stuhr, the Autobahn 1 is also extended to six strips.

In the further course to the triangle Ahlhorner Heide are currently only four lanes available, further to Osnabrück the six lane expansion is mostly completed: For the sections triangle Ahlhorner Heide to AS Cloppenburg and AS Cloppenburg to AS Vechta issued planning approval decisions in November 1999 and were since February 2005 incontestable. Since the streaks were already overbreadth, they were converted into the main carriageway. The cultivation of a new strip was carried out in the direction of Osnabrück until 2009 or 2010 and in the direction Bremen until 7 December 2012.

For the section AS Vechta to AS Lohne / Dinklage, the six-lane expansion in the direction of Bremen took place in 2008, in the direction of Osnabrück in 2009.

For the section AS Lohne / Dinklage to AS Neuenkirchen-Vörden, the planning approval procedure was initiated on 31 October 2011, the planning approval decision was made on 30 March 2015 and has been final (non-appealable) since 19 November 2015, as the action brought against it has been withdrawn, For the section AS Neuenkirchen-Vörden to AS Bramsche, the planning approval procedure has been in progress since 29 April 2013.

The section from AS Bramsche to AS Osnabrück-North was on 29 October 2010 six lanes released for traffic, the section between AS Osnabrück-Nord and AK Lotte / Osnabrück in summer 2007. Due to bridge damage in 2011 between the junction Osnabrück-Hafen and the Kreuz Lotte / Osnabrück one lane per travel direction is permanently blocked.

Between Osnabrück and Dortmund, the highway is four-lane expanded. Only a short section per direction between Osnabrück and Münster, as well as the section between Münster-Nord, via the Münster-Süd intersection to the junction Münster-Hiltrup, is already six-lane.

Between the Kamener Kreuz and Kreuz Köln-West the motorway is mostly six lane. The remaining gaps are under construction. From motorway junction Erftstadt to intersection Bliesheim, the A 1 runs together with the A 61. In this area, the highway has six lanes.

The Autobahn route 1, ends at Blankenheim, where the end of the highway has been on the Kelberg junction since 31 May 2012. Since then, no section is under construction but is being planned for closing the gap over the north-eastern edge of Eifel. On 4 May 2012, the state government of North Rhine-Westphalia (NRW) approved the plan for the first missing section from Blankenheim to Lommersdorf. The plan amendments are to be closed in 2018.

Later on, there are additional three lanes in several uphill sections. The motorway ends immediately after the junction 150, Saarbrücken-Burbach, is called from there federal road 268 and goes after 600 m in the street-level development of Saarbrücken.

== Plans ==
The federal government plans further expansion of the Autobahn. At the north end, the Baltic Sea coast is connected. Throughout the congested area between Hamburg and Cologne, basic renovations and almost continuous expansion to at least three lanes per direction and the development of many crossings and junctions have either recently been completed, under construction or in planning. In the Eifel, the gap is closed for another 28 kilometers (as of 31 May 2012).

=== Northern extension and the Fehmarnbelt link ===
In Ostholstein, the extension of the A 1 has reached Heiligenhafen-Ost. In connection with the construction of the Fixed Link across the Fehmarnbelt, there are also plans to expand the existing Federal Highway 207 as an extension of the A 1 between Heiligenhafen-Ost and Puttgarden in four lanes. This section of the hinterland connection is approximately 22 kilometers long and classified in the Federal Transport Infrastructure Plan 2003 in the emergency level Other needs. The commissioning of the fixed 20 km long Fehmarnbelt link was planned according to Danish plans for 2021. The Schleswig-Holstein Minister of Transport Meyer informed Federal Transport Minister Ramsauer on 11 September 2012 about the fact that Schleswig-Holstein wanted to register an additional connection (bridge or tunnel) via Fehmarnsund for inclusion in the Federal Transport Infrastructure Plan 2030. In the demand plan that applies from 2017, the four-lane extension of the B 207 between Puttgarden and Heiligenhafen-Ost will be included in the category Permanent and Fixed. 1 is (as of 2016) around 2030. The construction start of the road was in January 2023.

=== South of Hamburg ===
Between the Hamburg-Southeast intersection with the A 25 and the Horster triangle with the A 7, an eight-lane expansion is planned, to Hamburg-stillhorn in urgent need, from there in further demand with planning rights. The further course to the Buchholz Triangle is to become six lanes (further need with planning right). In the 2020s, the newly built A 26 is to be connected to the A1 by the Hamburg-Stillhorn junction is expanded to the motorway junction.

=== Eifel gap ===
The Vulkaneifel interchange with the A 48, just south of the 36 km long gap in the A 1 south of Cologne, was built in the 1970s. This interchange was finally utilized in the present century, though only for local traffic as the A1 is being extended past Kelberg. Plans have been made to complete the remaining 21 km over the Land borders between North Rhine-Westphalia and Rhineland-Palatinate, but this will take till 2018 before it is ready. Until then, through traffic between the two sections uses the A 48 and the A 61 and various regional roads.

=== Dreieck Buchholz to Bremen ===
This so-called private motorway was launched in August 2008 under the title "Operator Model Federal Highway A 1 Hamburg-Bremen" in the context of a PPP concession project as six-lane expansion of the highway between the Buchholz junction and the Bremen interchange. The section is part of the connection between the two major seaports, the Port of Hamburg and the port group Bremen / Bremerhaven and generates a high toll volume. The concession company A1 mobil consisting of the company Bilfinger Berger, the construction company Johann Bunte and the British investor John Laing plc [39] is responsible for the development and maintenance of the motorway for 30 years. In return, instead of the state, the private enterprise group receives part of the revenue from the resulting truck toll. How high this share is subject to secrecy. [39] The official start of construction took place in November 2008.

In the course of this expansion, the whispering asphalt in the first quarter of 2010 replaced on a refurbished and only three months released section of Bremen from a large area. When the large number of potholes no longer permitted orderly operation, the old carriageway was put back into service as a last resort. If the operator company, which only has a deposit of 10,000 euros, is in financial difficulties due to repeated construction defects, misjudgments of costs or other problems, the federal government will pay for the costs.

The traffic researcher Michael Schreckenberg criticized that the construction site sections were "made by technocrats," "without regard to the psychology of motorists." Since the beginning of construction work, the number of accidents in the area of the police station Rotenburg an der Wümme has increased by 121% from 2008 to 2009. The number of fatal accidents in the section increased from two (2008) to six (2009). In the first half of 2010, seven fatal accidents occurred. To avoid further accidents, it was decided to widen the construction site by one meter. However, since this is not regulated in the contract with the operator consortium, it has been funded with tax credits by the federal government.

The expansion was completed on 11 October 2012. In February 2014, Bilfinger-Berger announced that it has written off its 42.5% stake in the operating company worth 34 million euros. Already shortly after the beginning of the work, the operating company A1 got into financial difficulties on the move, which were not made public by a standstill agreement with the financing banks. At the end of August 2017, A1 mobil sued the Confederation for payment of 640 million euros. The reason stated was that the financial crisis caused freight traffic to collapse unpredictably.

=== Bremen to Dortmund ===
In the further demand with planning rights is an extension of the current six-lane section between the Bremen interchange and the Stuhr junction to eight lanes.

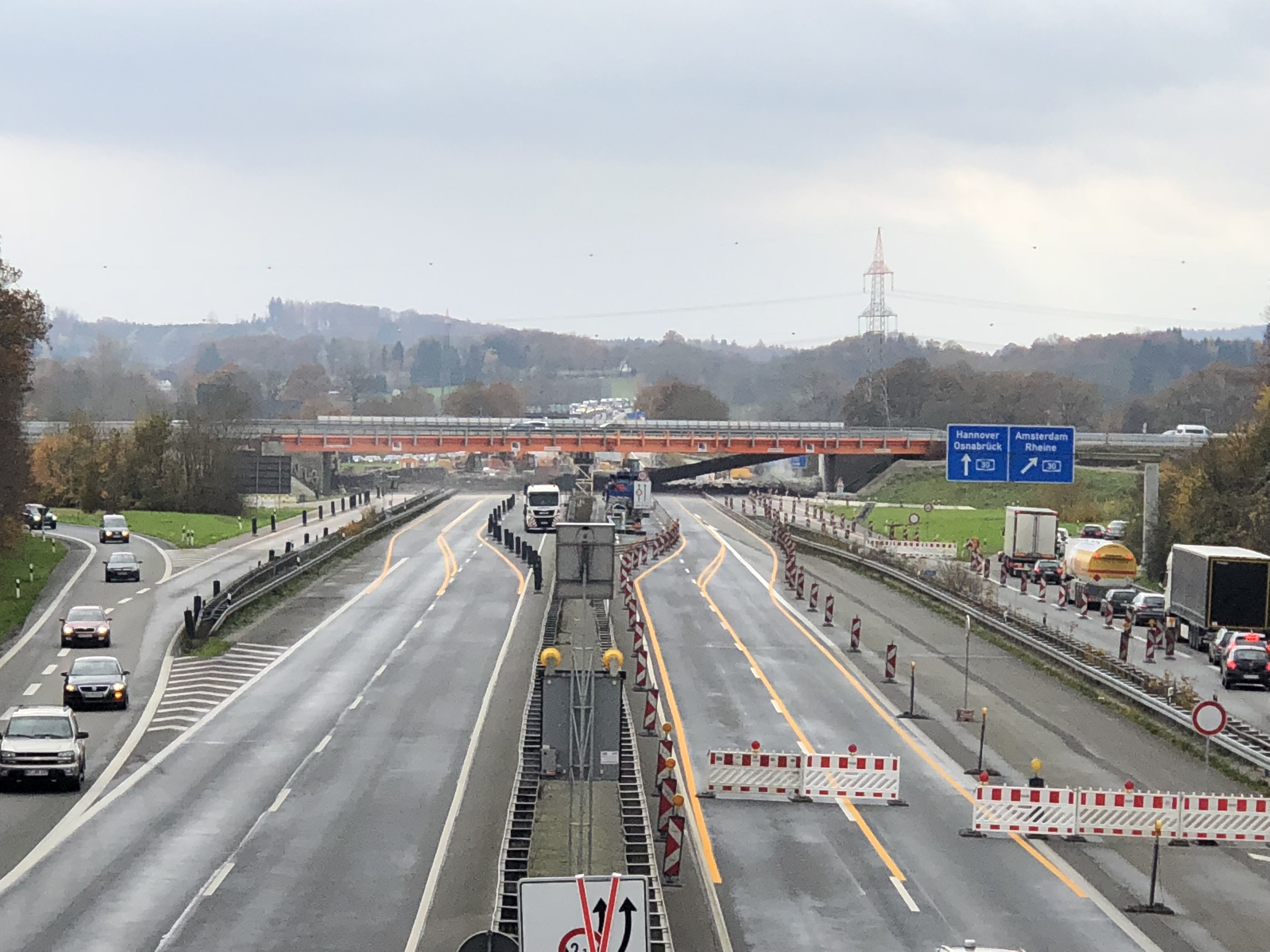
2017: Renovation work on the Kreuz Lotte / Osnabrück interchange in preparation for the six-lane expansion

In the further course, the A 1 to Cologne is to be expanded completely six-lane. The section from the current end of expansion at Delmenhorst Groß Mackenstedt to the Ahlhorner Heide triangle with the A 29 is provided with planning status in the Demand Plan of the Federal Government with the status Additional Demand. Further to Münster-Nord is the expansion in the urgent need - bottleneck elimination.

The operators of the Niedersachsenpark and regional politicians are calling for an additional connection between the Neuenkirchen / Vörden and Bramsche junctions to start traffic to and from the final 400 hectare intercommunal commercial and industrial park. The new interchange is likely to be realized as part of the six-lane expansion between Lohne / Dinklage and Bramsche.

In November 2010, the Lower Saxony State Authority for Road Construction and Transportation issued a plan approval decision for part of the extension of the A 33. The intersection of the A 33 with the A 1 will be on completion between the junctions Bramsche and Osnabrück-Nord. The motorway junction will be assigned the number 69 on the A 1. This was already taken into account at the time of the number assignment for the connection points: The Bramsche junction of the A 1 has the number 68 and the following junction Osnabrück-Nord has been assigned the number 70.

At Münster, the highway is already six lanes to Münster's third junction Münster-Hiltrup / Amelsbüren. The new interchange is located directly on the new Hansa Business Park and was released in October 2014. For the following section between the bridge over the Dortmund-Ems-Kanal at Amelsbüren in a southerly direction to the Kamener Kreuz, the expansion to six lanes in the Federal Transport Infrastructure Plan was classified as a priority with the elimination of bottlenecks. The expansion of the cross Dortmund / Unna, the Westhofener Cross and the Cross Wuppertal-North are also in urgent need - bottleneck elimination classified, the 8-lane expansion of the connection between the two first mentioned crosses is in further demand, partly classified with planning law.

=== Dortmund to Cologne ===
In this area, some subsections have been released six-lane for traffic. The last sections at Wuppertal and Remscheid with the valley bridge Langerfeld and the Wuppertal bridge Öhde were completed in August 2012 and handed over to traffic.

The redevelopment of the Wuppertal-Ronsdorf intersection to a motorway junction is planned again, to cover the south-western gap of the ring road around Wuppertal, which at the beginning of 2006 was extended by the commissioning of the Burgholz tunnel to the present state roads L 419 and L 418 to the Connection to the federal highways A 46 and A 535 at the Sonnborner Kreuz to complete.

The six-lane extension of the section Wermelskirchen junction to Remscheid junction began on 9 May 2005. The Remscheid junction was expanded until 2008. The expansion of the highway required a lowering of the carriageways, especially because of the landmarked railway bridge. The expansion was largely completed in 2012. Conversion and refurbishment of the valley bridge Höllenbach was delayed and lasted until the winter of 2017/2018, which is why in 2018, the six-lane traffic guidance will be established in this section.

In the area of the Cologne ring, the A 1 is also completely six-lane. Between Cologne-Bocklemünd and Kreuz Köln-West, three lanes have been opened per direction of travel since December 2012. The 1550 meter long enclosure Lövenich was completed by early 2013. The safety tests in the tunnel were declared over in May 2014. The speed in the tunnel is limited to 80 km / h. The section between Cologne-Bocklemünd and the cross Cologne north is six-lane since November 2015. The eight-lane expansion from Cologne-Niehl to the intersection Köln-Nord is planned in the Fernstraßenausbaugesetz as further need with planning right. The six-lane expansion from the intersection Köln-West to the triangle Erfttal is classified as Priority Needs - bottleneck elimination, the eight-lane extension of the following common section with the A 61 to the Bliesheim Cross is classified in further demand with planning rights.

Due to considerable damage in the bridge construction, a new construction of the Rhine bridge Leverkusen is planned. Meanwhile, the existing bridge for vehicles over 3.5 t total weight has been blocked. This leads to significant problems, since almost at the same time due to damage to the bridge construction, the Zoobrücke in Cologne fails as alternative route, since the city of Cologne had to introduce a limit to 7.5 t total weight for this bridge and on the federal highway A57 at Dormagen a motorway bridge destroyed by an arson attack and only replaced by a makeshift bridge. Following the implementation of the most urgent repairs on the Rheinbrücke Leverkusen, there has been a ban since May 2013 for vehicles over 44 t total weight, which has since been downgraded to 3.5 t. The maximum speed limit for all vehicles is limited to 60 km / h. To monitor the maximum speed and weight, stationary speed monitoring systems were installed on the bridge in both directions at the beginning and in the middle of the bridge. The measurement takes place via induction loops in the road surface. The taking of fines and custody was until the recent closure of the bridge for vehicles over 3.5 t far below the expectations of local authorities. The State Road Construction NRW plans to replace the current Rhine bridge by the construction of a ten-lane motorway bridge. Construction is scheduled to begin in 2017, and from 2020 (completion of the first new bridge section with five lanes) the current bridge will be demolished and the second bridge section of the new building built. The plan is criticized by local politicians because of the structural impact on the city of Leverkusen, as alternatives, the construction of a tunnel through Leverkusen city or an extension of the A 542 brought by new construction of another crossing of the Rhine. On 14 December 2017 the official groundbreaking ceremony for the construction of the bridge took place.

=== At the Eifel ===
The gap between the current motorway ends at Blankenheim and Kelberg, not far from the triangle Vulkaneifel, is still largely planned. Of the approximately 25 km long gap are about 15 km in the responsibility of construction of North Rhine-Westphalia, the remaining 10 km are to be realized by Rhineland-Palatinate. However, since the planning approval decisions have had to be amended several times since 2005, a gap closure is not expected before 2019.

The new construction of the A 1 through the Eifel, planned since the beginning of the 1980s, was completely included in the priority demand of the Federal Transport Infrastructure Plan 2003. Since 2004, the nature conservation appraisal has examined whether the planned route from the junction Blankenheim in the south to the junction Kelberg is environmentally sustainable; the corresponding results were included in the planning approval procedure. This was started for the northernmost section in North Rhine-Westphalia between the planned junction Lommersdorf and the connection point Blankenheim in May 2012; the other sections to Adenau and Kelberg are in nature conservation planning. The gap closure will cost around 400 million euros. The aim was to obtain a building permit for the remaining sections of the line by 2010 and to close the gap completely by 2015.

While many local residents and business representatives welcome the closing of the gap, nature conservation associations announced a judicial resistance. Planning has also been stalling for years due to environmental law, in particular the Habitats and Birds Directive.

Three parts still have to be built:

- from Blankenheim junction (near Tondorf) to Lommersdorf junction: the planning approval procedure has been in progress for this 6-kilometer stretch since May 2012.
- from the Lommersdorf interchange to the Adenau interchange: An update of the draft design is in progress for the 9-kilometer section.
- from the junction Adenau to the junction Kelberg: For the almost 11-kilometer section from the junction Adenau to the junction Kelberg approved the Federal Ministry of Transport in August 2014, the preliminary draft. The costs are estimated at a total of about 320 million euros. In 2017 [outdated] the disclosure of the planning documents should be made.

Especially in Rhineland-Palatinate, there were at times disagreements between the coalition partners of the state government regarding the further construction. All three sections are listed in the Federal Transport Infrastructure Plan 2030 as a priority requirement.

The area is fairly sparsely populated, and for longer drives between cities along A 1 such as Köln and Saarbrücken, a route along the A48 and A61 is available, so the demand is not so high. For driving between Blankenheim and Kelberg, the curvy route B258 can be used.

=== At Saarbrücken ===
On the Saarbrücken urban area is planned, the A 1 to the West Spangenbrücke, d. H. to the city highway A 620, to extend. Between the junctions SB-Von-der-Heydt and SB-Burbach a connection to the A 623 near the junction SB-Ludwigsberg is to be created, formerly also referred to as pivoting. However, for environmental reasons, this section was only listed with two lanes with oncoming traffic as a project with a special nature conservation planning mandate in urgent need in the Federal Transport Infrastructure Plan 2030. In the course of the existing four-lane Camphauser road as a continuation of the A 623 from the junction Ludwigsberg and then the piece of the B 268 to the West Spangenbrücke autobahnmäßig, d. H. be provided with central separation and without parallel intersections, expanded and then upgraded to A 1. However, the realization of this project has so far not been promoted. On 1 June 2013, the preliminary planning began. The Fernstraßenausbaugesetz contains a four-lane new building as an additional requirement with planning rights.

== Exit list ==
State	District	Location	km	mi	Exit	Name	Destinations	Notes
Schleswig-Holstein	Ostholstein	Heiligenhafen	124.8	77.5	–	–	B 207 (E47) – Fehmarn	Northern endpoint of motorway; southern endpoint of concurrency with E47
Schleswig-Holstein	Ostholstein	Heiligenhafen	124.4	77.3	5	Heiligenhafen-Ost	B 501 – Heiligenhafen, Grömitz	
Schleswig-Holstein	Ostholstein	Heiligenhafen	121.7	75.6	Ostseeblick parking area			
Schleswig-Holstein	Ostholstein	Heiligenhafen	120.6	74.9	6	Heiligenhafen-Mitte	Heiligenhafen, Ferienpark	
Schleswig-Holstein	Ostholstein	Gremersdorf	116.6	72.5	7	Gremersdorf	Gremersdorf, Neuratjensdorf	
Schleswig-Holstein	Ostholstein	Gremersdorf	113.4	70.5	8	Jahnshof	Jahnshof, Neukirchen, Giddendorf	
Schleswig-Holstein	Ostholstein	Oldenburg in Holstein	111.8	69.5	9	Oldenburg i.H.-Nord	Oldenburg in Holstein	
Schleswig-Holstein	Ostholstein	Oldenburg in Holstein	110.4	68.6	10	Oldenburg i.H.-Mitte	Oldenburg in Holstein, Weißenhäuser Strand	
Schleswig-Holstein	Ostholstein	Oldenburg in Holstein	109.6	68.1	11	Oldenburg i.H.-Süd	B 202 – Kiel, Lütjenburg	
Schleswig-Holstein	Ostholstein	Damlos	104.2	64.7	–	Damlos	Parking area Damlos	Southbound parking area closed
Schleswig-Holstein	Ostholstein	Lensahn	101.5	63.1	12	Lensahn	Lensahn, Schönwalde a.B., Cismar, Kellenhusen, Dahme	Schönwalde a.B. only signed southbound, Kellenhusen and Dahme only signed northbound
Schleswig-Holstein	Ostholstein	Schashagen	93.5	58.1	Parking area Hasselburger Mühle			
Schleswig-Holstein	Ostholstein	Neustadt in Holstein	90.0	55.9	13	Neustadt i.H.-Pelzerhaken	B 501 – Neustadt in Holstein, Grömitz, Schönwalde a.B.	Schönwalde a.B. only signed northbound
Schleswig-Holstein	Ostholstein	Sierksdorf	84.5	52.5	14	Neustadt i. H.-Mitte	Neustadt in Holstein, Sierksdorf, Hansa-Park	
Schleswig-Holstein	Ostholstein	Sierksdorf	81.4	50.6	–	Neustädter Bucht	Rest area "Neustädter Bucht"	
Schleswig-Holstein	Ostholstein	Scharbeutz	77.0	47.8	15	Eutin	Eutin, Kiel (B 76) – Haffkrug, Sierksdorf	Sierksdorf only signed northbound
Schleswig-Holstein	Ostholstein	Scharbeutz	77.0	47.8	16	Scharbeutz	B 432 – Scharbeutz, Bad Segeberg, Ahrensbök, Pönitz	Connection to B 76 southbound
Schleswig-Holstein	Ostholstein	Ratekau	73.7	45.8	17	Pansdorf	Pansdorf, Scharbeutz-Süd, Luschendorf	Scharbeutz-Süd only signed northbound
Schleswig-Holstein	Ostholstein	Ratekau	67.2	41.8	18	Ratekau	Ratekau, Niendorf/Ostsee, Timmendorfer Strand	
Schleswig-Holstein	Ostholstein	Ratekau	64.8	40.3	–	Sereetzer Feld	Parking area Sereetzer Feld	
Schleswig-Holstein	Ostholstein	Bad Schwartau	63.4	39.4	19	Sereetz	B 104 / B 75 – Sereetz, Lübeck, Travemünde, Dänischburg, Bad Schwartau, Ratekau-Techau	Lübeck, Travemünde and Dänischburg only signed southbound; Bad Schwartau and Ratekau-Techau only signed northbound
Schleswig-Holstein	Ostholstein	Bad Schwartau	62.2	38.6	20	Dreieck Bad Schwartau	A 226 – Lübeck, Travemünde (Skandinavienkai)	Southbound exit and entrance only
Schleswig-Holstein	Ostholstein	Bad Schwartau	60.7	37.7	21	Bad Schwartau	Bad Schwartau	
Schleswig-Holstein	Lübeck	Lübeck	57.3	35.6	22	Lübeck-Zentrum	Lübeck-Zentrum, Nordlandkai, Konstinkai, Musik- u. Kongresshalle, Stockelsdorf	
Schleswig-Holstein	Lübeck	Lübeck	54.1	33.6	23	Lübeck-Moisling	Lübeck-Moisling, -Buntekuh, -Schönböcken, CITTI-Park	Connection to B 75
Schleswig-Holstein	Stormarn	Hamberge	51.7	32.1	24	Kreuz Lübeck	A 14 / A 20 / A 21 – Kiel, Bad Segeberg, Berlin, Rostock, Lübeck-Genin, Lübeck Airport	A 14, A 21, Kiel, Bad Segeberg, Berlin only signed southbound; Southern endpoint of concurrency with E47. Western Endpoint of concurrency with E22
Schleswig-Holstein	Stormarn	Reinfeld, Schleswig-Holstein	44.7	27.8	25	Reinfeld	Reinfeld	Connection to B 75
Schleswig-Holstein	Stormarn	Reinfeld, Schleswig-Holstein	43.0	26.7	–	Raststätte Trave	Rest area Trave	only southbound exit and entrance
Schleswig-Holstein	Stormarn	Barnitz	40.6	25.2	–	Rastplatz Melmshöhe Süd	Parking area Melmshöhe Süd	only northbound exit and entrance
Schleswig-Holstein	Stormarn	Bad Oldesloe	37.6	23.4	26	Bad Oldesloe	B 208 – Bad Oldesloe, Ratzeburg	
Schleswig-Holstein	Stormarn	Hammoor	27.9	17.3	27	Kreuz Bargteheide	A 21 / A 24 / B 404 – Bargteheide, Kiel, Berlin, Schwarzenbek, Flensburg, Bad Segeberg	Flensburg and Bad Segeberg only signed northbound; Berlin only signed southbound
Schleswig-Holstein	Stormarn	Todendorf	25.3	15.7	–	Rasthof Buddikate	Rest area Buddikate	
Schleswig-Holstein	Stormarn	Großhansdorf	18.8	11.7	28	Ahrensburg	Ahrensburg, Großhansdorf, Siek	
Schleswig-Holstein	Stormarn	Siek	17.5	10.9	–	Ohlendiek	Parking area Ohlendiek	only northbound
Schleswig-Holstein	Stormarn	Siek	16.3	10.1	–	Ellerbrook	Parking area Ellerbrook	only southbound
Schleswig-Holstein	Stormarn	Braak, Schleswig-Holstein	14.5	9.0	29	Stapelfeld	Stapelfeld, HH-Rahlstedt, Reinbek, Trittau, Hamburg Airport	
Schleswig-Holstein	Stormarn	Barsbüttel	9.4	5.8	30	Barsbüttel	Barsbüttel, Glinde, Reinbek	
Schleswig-Holstein	Stormarn	Barsbüttel	6.6	4.1	31	Kreuz Hamburg-Ost	A 24 – Hamburg-Jenfeld	Southbound interchange
Hamburg	Hamburg	Hamburg	140.2	87.1	31	Kreuz Hamburg-Ost	A 24 – Berlin, Schwerin, Reinbek, HH-Jenfeld	Northbound interchange
Hamburg	Hamburg	Hamburg	142.9	88.8	32	Hamburg-Öjendorf	Hamburg-Öjendorf, Glinde, Oststeinbek	
Hamburg	Hamburg	Hamburg	144.7	89.9	33	HH-Billstedt	B 5 – HH-Billstedt, HH-Centrum B 5 – HH-Bergedorf, HH-Billstedt	Southbound exit and northbound entrance HH-Billstedt only signed northbound
Hamburg	Hamburg	Hamburg	148.6	92.3	34	HH-Moorfleet	HH-Moorfleet, HH-Billwerder	Southbound exit leads via ramp to exit 35
Hamburg	Hamburg	Hamburg	149.3	92.8	35	Dreieck Hamburg-Südost	A 25 – Geesthacht, HH-Allermöhe	Southbound exit via ramp from exit 34
Hamburg	Hamburg	Hamburg	152.3	94.6	36	Dreieck-Norderelbe	A 255 / B 4 / B 75 – HH-Veddel, Hafen, HH-Centrum, HH-Georgswerder	
Hamburg	Hamburg	Hamburg	155.1	96.4	–	Raststätte HH-Stillhorn	Rest area HH-Stillhorn	At exit 37
Hamburg	Hamburg	Hamburg	155.8	96.8	37	HH-Stillhorn	HH-Stillhorn, HH-Wilhelmsburg	Connection to B 75
Hamburg	Hamburg	Hamburg	157.7	98.0	38	HH-Harburg	HH-Harburg	Connection to B 4, B 73, and B 75
Lower Saxony	Harburg	Seevetal	15.8	9.8	39	Maschener Kreuz	A 39 / A 7 – Lüneburg, Flensburg, Kiel, Hamburg (West), Seevetal-Maschen	A 7 northbound only; Seevetal-Maschen only signed northbound
Lower Saxony	Harburg	Seevetal	17.1	10.6	40	Horster Dreieck	A 7 – Hannover, Seevetal, Ramelsloh	A 7 southbound only
Lower Saxony	Harburg	Seevetal	19.6	12.2	41	Seevetal-Hittfeld	Seevetal-Hittfeld, Jesteburg	
Lower Saxony	Harburg	Seevetal	21.0	13.0	–	Rastplatz Hittfeld-Süd	Parking area Hittfeld-Süd	Northbound only
Lower Saxony	Harburg	Seevetal	21.5	13.4	–	Rastplatz Hittfeld-Nord	Parking area Hittfeld-Nord	Southbound only
Lower Saxony	Harburg	Buchholz in der Nordheide	25.8	16.0	42	Dibbersen	B 75 – Dibbersen, Buchholz, Nenndorf	
Lower Saxony	Harburg	Buchholz in der Nordheide	28.0	17.4	43	Buchholzer Dreieck	A 261 – Flensburg, Kiel, Hamburg-West, Hamburg Airport	Hamburg-Airport signed northbound only
Lower Saxony	Harburg	Neu Wulmstorf	31.1	19.3	44	Rade	B 3 – Rade, Stade, Buxtehude, Neu Wulmstorf	
Lower Saxony	Harburg	Appel, Germany	35.8	22.2	Rest area	Raststätte Aarbachkate / Hollenstedt	Rest area Aarbachkate and Hollenstedt	Raststätte Aarbachkate (northbound); Raststätte Hollenstedt (southbound)
Lower Saxony	Harburg	Hollenstedt	38.0	23.6	45	Hollenstedt	Hollenstedt, Tostedt, Moisburg, Buxtehude	Tostedt, Moisburg signed southbound only; Buxtehude signed northbound only
Lower Saxony	Harburg	Regesbostel	40.6	25.2	–	Stellheide West	Parking area Stellheide	Southbound only
Lower Saxony	Harburg	Halvesbostel	41.9	26.0	–	Stellheide Ost	Parking area Stellheide	Northbound only
Lower Saxony	Harburg	Heidenau, Lower Saxony	43.3	26.9	46	Heidenau	Heidenau, Halvesbostel	
Lower Saxony	Rotenburg	Tiste	51.4	31.9	–	Raststätte Osetal	Rest area Osetal	
Lower Saxony	Rotenburg	Sittensen	53.1	33.0	47	Sittensen	Sittensen, Scheeßel, Bremervörde, Zeven	Bremervörde signed southbound only
Lower Saxony	Rotenburg	Elsdorf, Lower Saxony	66.5	41.3	–	Hatzte	Parking area Hatzte	
Lower Saxony	Rotenburg	Elsdorf, Lower Saxony	66.5	41.3	48	Elsdorf	Elsdorf, Zeven, Scheeßel	Scheeßel signed northbound only
Lower Saxony	Rotenburg	Gyhum	71.1	44.2	–	Glindbusch	Parking area Glindbusch	
Lower Saxony	Rotenburg	Gyhum	72.3	44.9	49	Bockel	B 71 – Bockel, Rotenburg, Bremervörde, Zeven, Mulmshorn	Rotenburg signed southbound only; Bremervörde, Zeven, Mulmshorn signed northbound only
Lower Saxony	Rotenburg	Sottrum	83.4	51.8	50	Stuckenborstel	B 75 – Stuckenborstel, Sottrum, Ottersberg, Rotenburg	Rotenburg signed northbound only
Lower Saxony	Rotenburg	Sottrum	86.0	53.4	–	Grundbergsee	Rest area Grundbergsee	
Lower Saxony	Verden	Ottersberg	87.7	54.5	51	Posthausen	Posthausen, Ottersberg, Ottersberg-Bahnhof	
Lower Saxony	Verden	Oyten	96.9	60.2	52	Oyten	Oyten, Achim	
Lower Saxony	Verden	Oyten	98.0	60.9	–	Rastplatz Thünen	Parking area Thünen	
Lower Saxony	Verden	Achim	100.3	62.3	53	Bremer Kreuz	A 27 – Achim, Hannover, Cuxhaven, Bremen, Bremen-Sebaldsbrück	Bremen signed southbound only
Lower Saxony	Verden	Achim	102.2	63.5	54	Uphusen / Bremen-Mahndorf	Uphusen, Bremen-Mahndorf	
Bremen	Bremen	Hemelingen	103.5	64.3	–	Rastplatz Mahndorfer Marsch West	Parking area Mahndorfer Marsch West	Southbound only
Bremen	Bremen	Bremen	107.6	66.9	55	Bremen-Hemelingen	Bremen-Hemelingen, Bremen-Centrum, Industry: Mercedes-Benz, Hansalinie	Bremen-Centrum signed southbound only
Bremen	Bremen	Bremen	109.8	68.2	56	Bremen-Arsten	B 6n – Bremen-Arsten, Bremen Airport, Weyhe, Bremen-Centrum	Bremen-Centrum signed northbound only
Bremen	Bremen	Bremen	111.0	69.0	–	Rastplatz Ahlken	Parking area Ahlken	Southbound only
Bremen	Bremen	Bremen	112.2	69.7	–	Rastplatz Krumhörens Kuhlen	Parking area Krumhörens Kuhlen	Northbound only
Lower Saxony	Diepholz	Stuhr	113.7	70.6	57	Bremen-Neustadt	B 6 – Bremen-Neustadt, Stuhr-Brinkum, Syke, Bassum	
Lower Saxony	Diepholz	Stuhr	120.8	75.1	58a	Dreieck Stuhr	A 28 / E22 – Oldenburg	Stuhr, Groß Mackenstedt signed southbound only; southern endpoint of concurrency with E22; northern endpoint of concurrency with E37; connection to B 322 and B 439
Lower Saxony	Diepholz	Stuhr	120.9	75.1	58b	Delmenhorst-Ost	B 322 – Stuhr, Syke, Groß Mackenstedt	connection to B 439
Lower Saxony	Diepholz	Stuhr	123.5	76.7	–	Rastplatz Kiekuk-Nord	Parking area Kiekuk-Nord	Southbound only
Lower Saxony	Diepholz	Stuhr	124.0	77.1	–	Rastplatz Kiekuk-Ost	Parking area Kiekuk-Ost	Northbound only
Lower Saxony	Oldenburg	Groß Ippener	127.6	79.3	59	Groß Ippener	Groß Ippener, Delmenhorst, Delmenhorst-Adelheide, Harpstedt	
Lower Saxony	Oldenburg	Groß Ippener	129.1	80.2	–	Parkplatz Oldenburg	Parking area Oldenburg	Southbound only
Lower Saxony	Oldenburg	Groß Ippener	129.6	80.5	–	Parkplatz Groß Ippener	Parking area Groß Ippener	Northbound only
Lower Saxony	Oldenburg	Prinzhöfte	132.5	82.3	–	Parkplatz Delmetal Nord	Parking area Delmetal Nord	Southbound only
Lower Saxony	Oldenburg	Prinzhöfte	134.0	83.3	–	Parkplatz Delmetal Süd	Parking area Delmetal Süd	Northbound only
Lower Saxony	Oldenburg	Prinzhöfte	136.1	84.6	–	Parkplatz Prinzhöfte	Parking area Prinzhöfte	
Lower Saxony	Oldenburg	Dötlingen	140.6	87.4	60	Wildeshausen Nord	B 213 – Wildeshausen, Harpstedt, Delmenhorst, Dötlingen	
Lower Saxony	Oldenburg	Dötlingen	142.4	88.5	–	Raststätte Wildeshausen	Rest area Wildeshausen	
Lower Saxony	Oldenburg	Wildeshausen	145.5	90.4	–	Parkplatz Wildeshausen	Parking area Wildeshausen	Southbound only
Lower Saxony	Oldenburg	Wildeshausen	146.8	91.2	–	Parkplatz Wildeshausen	Parking area Wildeshausen	Southbound only
Lower Saxony	Oldenburg	Wildeshausen	148.9	92.5	61	Wildeshausen-West	Wildeshausen, Ahlhorn	
Lower Saxony	Oldenburg	Großenkneten	153.4	95.3	–	Parkplatz Engelmannsbäke	Parking area Engelmannsbäke	
Lower Saxony	Cloppenburg	Emstek	158.3	98.4	62	Ahlhorner Heide	Ahlhorn-Süd	Southbound exit and northbound entrance only
Lower Saxony	Cloppenburg	Emstek	158.3	98.4	62	Dreieck Ahlhorner Heide	A 29 – Oldenburg, Ahlhorn, Wilhelmshaven	Wilhelmshaven signed northbound only; northern endpoint of concurrency with E233
Lower Saxony	Cloppenburg	Emstek	159.5	99.1	–	Parkplatz Garterfeld	Parking area Garterfeld	Southbound only
Lower Saxony	Cloppenburg	Emstek	160.8	99.9	–	Parkplatz Drantumer Mühle	Parking area Drantumer Mühle	Northbound only
Lower Saxony	Cloppenburg	Emstek	162.7	101.1	63	Cloppenburg	B 69 / B 72 – Cloppenburg, Emstek, Visbek, Friesoythe	Friesoythe, Visbek signed northbound only; Vechta-Nord, Visbek signed southbound only; southern endpoint of concurrency with E233
Lower Saxony	Cloppenburg	Cappeln	165.9	103.1	–	Parkplatz Cappeln Hagelage	Parking area Cappeln Hagelage	
Lower Saxony	Vechta (district)	Bakum	172.8	107.4	64	Vechta	Vechta, Goldenstedt, Bakum, Essen	Goldenstedt signed southbound only
Lower Saxony	Vechta (district)	Bakum	174.0	108.1	–	Parkplatz Bakumer Wiesen	Parking area Bakumer Wiesen	
Lower Saxony	Vechta (district)	Lohne, Germany	180.5	112.2	65	Lohne / Dinklage	Lohne, Dinklage, Löningen, Quakenbrück	
Lower Saxony	Vechta (district)	Dinklage	182.0	113.1	–	Langwege	Parking area Langwege	
Lower Saxony	Vechta (district)	Holdorf, Lower Saxony	185.0	115.0	66	Holdorf	B 214 – Holdorf, Diepholz, Steinfeld	
Lower Saxony	Vechta (district)	Holdorf, Lower Saxony	188.0	116.8	–	Raststätte "Dammer Berge"	Rest area "Dammer Berge"	Bridge service area
Lower Saxony	Vechta (district)	Neuenkirchen-Vörden	200.1	124.3	67	Neuenkirchen / Vörden	Neuenkirchen, Vörden	
Lower Saxony	Vechta (district)	Neuenkirchen-Vörden	202.8	126.0	Exit	Rieste		2026
Lower Saxony	Osnabrück (district)	Bramsche	208.5	129.6	–	Parkplatz Bramsche	Parking area Bramsche	
Lower Saxony	Osnabrück (district)	Bramsche	209.6	130.2	–	Parkplatz Ahrensfeld	Parking area Ahrensfeld	
Lower Saxony	Osnabrück (district)	Bramsche	211.9	131.7	68	Bramsche	B 214 – Bramsche, Fürstenau, Bad Essen, Engter	Fürstenau signed northbound only; connection to B 68
Lower Saxony	Osnabrück (district)	Wallenhorst	218.3	135.6	70	Osnabrück-Nord	B 68 – Osnabrück-Nord, Wallenhorst, Bramsche-Süd	Bramsche-Süd signed northbound only
North Rhine-Westphalia	Steinfurt	Lotte	223.2	138.7	–	Hasetal	Parking area Hasetal	
Lower Saxony	Osnabrück (district)	Osnabrück	225.2	139.9	71	Osnabrück-Hafen	Osnabrück-Hafen, Westerkappeln, Lotte-Wersen	
North Rhine-Westphalia	Steinfurt	Lotte	229.3	142.5	72	Kreuz Lotte / Osnabrück	A 30 – Hannover, Osnabrück, Amsterdam, Rheine	
North Rhine-Westphalia	Steinfurt	Tecklenburg	232.6	144.5	–	Habichtswald / Petersberg	Parking area Habichtswald / Petersberg	
North Rhine-Westphalia	Steinfurt	Tecklenburg	234.5	145.7	–	Raststätte "Tecklenburger Land"	Rest area "Tecklenburger Land"	
North Rhine-Westphalia	Steinfurt	Lengerich, Westphalia	239.0	148.5	–	Exterheide / Bashake	Parking area Exterheide / Bashake	
North Rhine-Westphalia	Steinfurt	Lengerich, Westphalia	240.6	149.5	73	Lengerich	Lengerich, Tecklenburg, Bad Iburg, Lienen, Ibbenbüren	Lienen signed southbound only, Ibbenbüren signed northbound only
North Rhine-Westphalia	Steinfurt	Lengerich, Westphalia	241.7	150.2	–	Wechte / Sonnenhügel	Parking area Wechte / Sonnenhügel	
North Rhine-Westphalia	Steinfurt	Lengerich, Westphalia	243.9	151.6	–	Settel	Parking area Settel	northbound only
North Rhine-Westphalia	Steinfurt	Lengerich, Westphalia	245.7	152.7	–	Buddenkuhle	Parking area Buddenkuhle	southbound only
North Rhine-Westphalia	Steinfurt	Ladbergen	249.0	154.7	74	Ladbergen	B 475 – Ladbergen, Glandorf, Saerbeck, Warendorf, Emsdetten	Warendorf, Emsdetten signed southbound only; Glandorf, Saerbeck signed northbound only
North Rhine-Westphalia	Steinfurt	Ladbergen	250.0	155.3	–	Aabach	Parking area Aabach	southbound only
North Rhine-Westphalia	Steinfurt	Ladbergen	250.7	155.8	–	Mühlenbach	Parking area Mühlenbach	northbound only
North Rhine-Westphalia	Steinfurt	Greven	253.2	157.3	75	Flughafen Münster / Osnabrück	Flughafen Münster / Osnabrück, Ostbevern	
North Rhine-Westphalia	Steinfurt	Greven	255.5	158.8	–	Kroner Heide	Parking area Kroner Heide	northbound only
North Rhine-Westphalia	Steinfurt	Greven	257.0	159.7	–	Maestruper Brook	Parking area Maestruper Brook	southbound only
North Rhine-Westphalia	Steinfurt	Greven	258.3	160.5	76	Greven	B 481 – Greven, Emsdetten, Nordwalde, Telgte, Münster-Ost	Emsdetten signed northbound only; Nordwalde, Telgte, Münster-Ost signed southbound only
North Rhine-Westphalia	Steinfurt	Greven	260.6	161.9	–	Klaterberg	Parking area Klaterberg	northbound only
North Rhine-Westphalia	Steinfurt	Greven	261.5	162.5	–	Gimbter Heide	Parking area Gimbter Heide	northbound only
North Rhine-Westphalia	Münster	Münster	264.8	164.5	–	Sandrup / Plugger Heide	Rest area Sandrup / Plugger Heide	
North Rhine-Westphalia	Münster	Münster	270.4	168.0	77	Münster-Nord	B 54 – Münster, Rheine	Münster-Nord, Rheine signed northbound only; Münster, Havixbeck signed southbound only
North Rhine-Westphalia	Münster	Münster	275.5	171.2	–	Raststätte "Münsterland"	Rest area "Münsterland"	
North Rhine-Westphalia	Münster	Münster	278.9	173.3	78	Kreuz Münster-Süd	A 43 / B 51 – Münster, Recklinghausen, Dülmen	
North Rhine-Westphalia	Münster	Münster	282.2	175.4	79a	Münster-Hiltrup	Münster-Hiltrup, -Amelsbüren, Senden	
North Rhine-Westphalia	Coesfeld	Senden	287.5	178.6	–	Davert	Parking area "Davert"	
North Rhine-Westphalia	Coesfeld	Ascheberg	291.5	181.1	–	Kurze Geist / Hohe Heide	Parking area "Kurze Geist / Hohe Heide"	
North Rhine-Westphalia	Coesfeld	Ascheberg	293.5	182.4	79b	Ascheberg	B 58 – Ascheberg, Lüdinghausen, Drensteinfurt	Connection to B 54
North Rhine-Westphalia	Coesfeld	Ascheberg	296.0	183.9	–	Raststätte "Eichengrund" / "Im Mersch"	Rest area "Eichengrund" / "Im Mersch"	
North Rhine-Westphalia	Coesfeld	Ascheberg	298.8	185.7	–	Westerwinkel / Hasenkämpe	Parking area Westerwinkel / Hasenkämpe	
North Rhine-Westphalia	Unna (district)	Werne	304.9	189.5	80	Hamm-Bockum	Hamm, -Bockum, -Hövel, Werne, Selm	Connection to B 54 and B 63
North Rhine-Westphalia	Unna (district)	Werne	307.5	191.1	–	Fuchs-Eggen / An der Landwehr	Parking area Fuchs-Eggen / An der Landwehr	Connection to B 233
North Rhine-Westphalia	Hamm	Hamm	309.9	192.6	81	Hamm / Bergkamen	Hamm, Bergkamen, Lünen, Werne-Süd	Werne-Süd signed northbound only
North Rhine-Westphalia	Hamm	Hamm	313.6	194.9	–	Overberger Busch / Haus Reck	Parking area Overberger Busch / Haus Reck	
North Rhine-Westphalia	Unna (district)	Kamen	315.7	196.2	82	Kamener Kreuz	A 2 – Oberhausen, Dortmund, Hannover, Bielefeld	Dortmund-Nordost signed northbound only; Hannover, Bielefeld signed southbound only
North Rhine-Westphalia	Unna (district)	Kamen	318.8	198.1	83	Kamen-Zentrum	B 233 – Kamen-Zentrum, Unna-Königsborn	
North Rhine-Westphalia	Unna (district)	Unna	324.4	201.6	84	Unna	B 1 – Unna	
North Rhine-Westphalia	Unna (district)	Unna	324.8	201.8	84	Kreuz Dortmund / Unna	A 44 / B 1 – Kassel, Paderborn, Dortmund	
North Rhine-Westphalia	Unna (district)	Schwerte	332.4	206.5	–	Raststätte "Lichtendorf"	Rest area "Lichtendorf"	
North Rhine-Westphalia	Unna (district)	Schwerte	335.3	208.3	85	Schwerte	B 236 – Schwerte	
North Rhine-Westphalia	Unna (district)	Schwerte	338.9	210.6	86	Westhofener Kreuz	A 45 – Dortmund, Frankfurt a.M., Siegen, Hagen	Dortmund signed northbound only; Hagen signed southbound only; Connection to B 54
North Rhine-Westphalia	Hagen	Hagen	342.2	212.6	–	Raststätte "Lennhof"	Rest area "Lennhof"	
North Rhine-Westphalia	Hagen	Hagen	344.2	213.9	87	Hagen-Nord	Hagen-Nord, Hagen-Hohenlimburg, Dortmund-Hohensyburg	Hagen-Hohenlimburg, Iserlohn signed northbound only
North Rhine-Westphalia	Hagen	Hagen	347.6	216.0	88	Hagen-West	B 226	Southbound -West added to Hagen destination; Connection to B 54
North Rhine-Westphalia	Hagen	Hagen	349.3	217.0	Parking area	Funckenhausen	Parking area "Funckenhausen"	Northbound only
North Rhine-Westphalia	Hagen	Hagen	349.8	217.4	–	Eichenkamp	Parking area "Eichenkamp"	Southbound only
North Rhine-Westphalia	Ennepe-Ruhr-Kreis	Wetter (Ruhr)	352.3	218.9	89	Volmarstein	Volmarstein, Haspe	Connection to B 234
North Rhine-Westphalia	Ennepe-Ruhr-Kreis	Gevelsberg	356.0	221.2	90	Gevelsberg	Gevelsberg, Ennepetal, Sprockhövel	Ennepetal, Sprockhövel signed southbound only; Connection to B 234
North Rhine-Westphalia	Ennepe-Ruhr-Kreis	Gevelsberg	358.8	222.9	–	Bruchmühle / Klosterholz	Parking area Bruchmühle / Klosterholz	
North Rhine-Westphalia	Ennepe-Ruhr-Kreis	Sprockhövel	362.0	224.9	92	Kreuz Wuppertal-Nord	A 46 / A 43 – Düsseldorf, Wuppertal, Bochum, Gevelsberg-West A 43 – Recklinghausen, Bochum	Gevelsberg-West signed northbound only; Bochum signed southbound only; connection via B 326 Northbound Exit and southbound entrance only
North Rhine-Westphalia	Ennepe-Ruhr-Kreis	Schwelm	365.6	227.2	93	Wuppertal-Langerfeld	B 7 – Wuppertal-Langerfeld, Schwelm, Wuppertal-Oberbarmen, Ennepetal	Wuppertal-Oberbarmen, Ennepetal signed northbound only; Also connects to B 483
North Rhine-Westphalia	Wuppertal	Wuppertal	368.0	228.7	–	Kleinraststätte "Ehrenberg" / "Kucksiepen"	Rest area "Ehrenberg" / "Kucksiepen"	
North Rhine-Westphalia	Wuppertal	Wuppertal	373.1	231.8	94	Wuppertal-Ronsdorf	Wuppertal-Ronsdorf, Remscheid-Lüttringhausen-Nord	
North Rhine-Westphalia	Remscheid	Remscheid	376.4	233.9	95a	Remscheid-Lennep	Remscheid-Lennep, -Lüttringhausen-Süd, Radevormwald	Radevormwald signed northbound only
North Rhine-Westphalia	Remscheid	Remscheid	379.1	235.6	95b	Remscheid	B 229 – Remscheid, Lüdenscheid, Radevormwald, Hückeswagen, Solingen, Wipperfürth	Solingen, Wipperfürth signed southbound only; Lüdenscheid, Radevormwald signed northbound only; also serves B 51
North Rhine-Westphalia	Remscheid	Remscheid	381.6	237.1	–	Raststätte "Remscheid"	Rest area "Remscheid"	Serves Remscheid-Großberghausen, only exit allowed, entrance from rest area only
North Rhine-Westphalia	Rheinisch-Bergischer Kreis	Wermelskirchen	385.3	239.4	96	Wermelskirchen	Wermelskirchen, Schloss Burg, Hückeswagen, Wipperfürth	Hückeswagen, Wipperfürth signed northbound only; connection to B 51
North Rhine-Westphalia	Rheinisch-Bergischer Kreis	Burscheid	393.1	244.3	97	Burscheid	B 51 – Burscheid, Altenberg, Bergisch-Gladbach, Odenthal	B 51, Bergisch-Gladbach, Odenthal signed southbound only
North Rhine-Westphalia	Leverkusen	Leverkusen	403.2	250.5	98	Kreuz Leverkusen	A 3 – Frankfurt a.M., Köln, Airport Köln, Leverkusen, Oberhausen, Olpe, Köln-Ost	Olpe, Köln-Ost signed northbound only, Airport Köln, Leverkusen signed southbound only; Connection to B 8
North Rhine-Westphalia	Leverkusen	Leverkusen	406.4	252.5	99	Kreuz Leverkusen-West	A 59 – Leverkusen-Zentrum, -Rheindorf, Düsseldorf	Connection to A 542
North Rhine-Westphalia	Köln	Köln	408.4	253.8	100	Köln Niehl	Köln-Fühlingen, -Niehl, -Merkenich, Ford Merkenich, Ford Niehl	Connection to B 9
North Rhine-Westphalia	Köln	Köln	413.2	256.8	101	Kreuz Köln-Nord	A 57 – Köln-Zentrum, Krefeld, Neuss, Köln-Chorweiler, Düsseldorf	Neuss signed southbound only, Köln-Chorweiler, Düsseldorf signed northbound only; southern endpoint of concurrency with E37
North Rhine-Westphalia	Köln	Köln	416.8	259.0	102	Köln-Bocklemünd	B 59 – Köln-Bocklemünd, Grevenbroich, Pulheim	
North Rhine-Westphalia	Köln	Köln	421.3	261.8	103	Köln-Lövenich	Köln-Lövenich, -Müngersdorf	Enclosed exit
North Rhine-Westphalia	Köln	Köln	422.7	262.7	104	Kreuz Köln-West	A 4 – Olpe, Köln-Bonn Airport, Köln-Süd, Aachen	
North Rhine-Westphalia	Köln	Köln	423.6	263.2	104	Frechen	B 264 – Frechen	
North Rhine-Westphalia	Rhein-Erft-Kreis	Hürth	427.9	265.9	105	Gleuel	Gleuel	Connection to B 264
North Rhine-Westphalia	Rhein-Erft-Kreis	Hürth	431.8	268.3	–	Raststätte "Ville"	Rest area "Ville"	
North Rhine-Westphalia	Rhein-Erft-Kreis	Erftstadt	432.9	269.0	106	Hürth	Hürth, Knapsack, Kierdorf	Connection to A 61 via L495
North Rhine-Westphalia	Rhein-Erft-Kreis	Erftstadt	436.7	271.4	107	Dreieck Erftal	A 61 – Venlo, Mönchengladbach, Aachen	northbound only
North Rhine-Westphalia	Rhein-Erft-Kreis	Erftstadt	436.7	271.4				northern endpoint of concurrency with A 61
North Rhine-Westphalia	Rhein-Erft-Kreis	Erftstadt	438.3	272.3	108	Erftstadt	B 265 – Erftstadt	
North Rhine-Westphalia	Rhein-Erft-Kreis	Erftstadt	442.4	274.9	109	Kreuz Bliesheim	A 61 – Koblenz, Weilerswist, A 553 – Brühl	southern endpoint of concurrency with A 61; northern endpoint of concurrency with E29; Weilerswist signed southbound only
North Rhine-Westphalia	Euskirchen (district)	Weilerswist	444.4	276.1	110a	Weilerswist-West	Weilerswist, Friesheim	
North Rhine-Westphalia	Euskirchen (district)	Weilerswist	446.0	277.1	–	Oberste Heide	Rest area "Oberste Heide"	
North Rhine-Westphalia	Euskirchen (district)	Euskirchen	453.8	282.0	110b	Euskirchen (north)	Euskirchen	
North Rhine-Westphalia	Euskirchen (district)	Euskirchen	455.0	282.7	110b	Euskirchen (south)	B 56n – Zülpich	
North Rhine-Westphalia	Euskirchen (district)	Euskirchen	458.3	284.8	111	Wisskirchen	B 266 – Wisskirchen, Kommern, Obergartzem	Kommern signed southbound only; Connection to B 56
North Rhine-Westphalia	Euskirchen (district)	Mechernich	462.0	287.1	–	Grüner Winkel	Parking area "Grüner Winkel"	
North Rhine-Westphalia	Euskirchen (district)	Mechernich	466.9	290.1	112	Mechernich	B 477 – Mechernich, Bad Münstereifel	
North Rhine-Westphalia	Euskirchen (district)	Nettersheim	472.5	293.6	113	Nettersheim	Nettersheim, Kall, Schleiden	
North Rhine-Westphalia	Euskirchen (district)	Nettersheim	476.9	296.3	–	Engelgau	Parking area "Engelgau"	
North Rhine-Westphalia	Euskirchen (district)	Blankenheim	480.1	298.3	114	Blankenheim	B 51 – Blankenheim, Dahlem, Trier	Southbound exit and northbound entrance only; Connection to B 258; southern endpoint of concurrency with E29
North Rhine-Westphalia	Euskirchen (district)	Blankenheim	480.5	298.6		Transition to L115	L115 – A 48, Gerolstein, Ahrhütte, Nürburgring, Freilinger See, Trier, Dahlem, Blankenheim, Tondorf	Southern endpoint of northern part of motorway
North Rhine-Westphalia	Euskirchen (district)	Blankenheim			115	Lommersdorf		
Rhineland-Palatinate	Ahrweiler (district)	Wirft			116	Adenau		
Rhineland-Palatinate	Vulkaneifel	Dreis-Brück	67.6	42.0	117	Kelberg	B 410 – Kelberg, Nürburgring	Northern endpoint of southern part of motorway; also services B 421
Rhineland-Palatinate	Vulkaneifel	Dreis-Brück	69.6	43.2	118	Gerolstein	B 410 – Köln ( A 1), Gerolstein, Dockweiler, Dreis-Brück, Nerdlen	Köln, Dreis-Brück signed northbound only; connection to B 421
Rhineland-Palatinate	Vulkaneifel	Darscheid	76.0	47.2	119	Daun	B 257 – Daun, Darscheid	
Rhineland-Palatinate	Altenkirchen (district)	Mehren	78.8	49.0	120	Dreieck Vulkaneifel	A 48 – Koblenz, Cochem, Köln	Cochem signed southbound only, Köln signed northbound only; northern endpoint of concurrency with E44
Rhineland-Palatinate	Altenkirchen (district)	Mehren	80.9	50.3	121	Mehren	B 421 – Mehren, Zell/Mosel	
Rhineland-Palatinate	Altenkirchen (district)	Mehren	82.6	51.3	Parking area	Schalkenmehren	Parking area Schalkenmehren	Southbound only
Rhineland-Palatinate	Vulkaneifel	Udler	84.5	52.5	Parking area	Schalkenmehren	Parking area Schalkenmehren	Northbound only
Rhineland-Palatinate	Bernkastel-Wittlich	Wallscheid	89.2	55.4	122	Manderscheid	Manderscheid, Gillenfeld	
Rhineland-Palatinate	Bernkastel-Wittlich	Niederöfflingen	93.2	57.9	–	Kleinraststätte "Eifel"	Rest area "Eifel"	
Rhineland-Palatinate	Bernkastel-Wittlich	Hasborn	97.3	60.5	123	Hasborn	Hasborn, Bad Bertrich	Bad Bertrich signed northbound only
Rhineland-Palatinate	Bernkastel-Wittlich	Wittlich	98.7	61.3	–	Flußbach	Parking area Flußbach	
Rhineland-Palatinate	Bernkastel-Wittlich	Wittlich	104.0	64.6	–	Lüxem	Parking area Lüxem	
Rhineland-Palatinate	Bernkastel-Wittlich	Wittlich	106.0	65.9	125	Wittlich-Mitte	B 50 – Wittlich-Mitte, Bernkastel-Kues, Traben-Trarbach, Alf/Mosel	also serves B 49
Rhineland-Palatinate	Bernkastel-Wittlich	Altrich	110.3	68.5	126	Kreuz Wittlich	A 60 / B 50 – Lüttich, Bitburg, Mainz, Frankfurt-Hahn, Wittlich-West	Wittlich-West signed northbound only
Rhineland-Palatinate	Bernkastel-Wittlich	Salmtal	114.0	70.8	–	Salmrohr / Pohlbach	Parking area Salmrohr / Pohlbach	
Rhineland-Palatinate	Bernkastel-Wittlich	Esch, Bernkastel-Wittlich	116.2	72.2	127	Salmtal	Salmtal, Klausen, Piesport, Bernkastel-Kues, Sehlem	Bernkastel-Kues signed northbound only, Sehlem signed southbound only
Rhineland-Palatinate	Bernkastel-Wittlich	Hetzerath	119.8	74.4	–	Hetzerath / Rivenich	Parking area Hetzerath / Rivenich	
Rhineland-Palatinate	Bernkastel-Wittlich	Hetzerath	122.1	75.9	128	Föhren	Föhren, Hetzerath, Leiwen, Bekond	connection to B 53
Rhineland-Palatinate	Trier-Saarburg	Schweich	126.3	78.5	129	Schweich	Schweich	connection to B 53
Rhineland-Palatinate	Trier-Saarburg	Longuich	129.2	80.3	130	Dreieck Moseltal	A 602 – Luxembourg, Trier, Fell, Longuich	A 64 / B 52 / B 49 via A 602; Fell signed southbound only; southern endpoint of concurrency with E44; northern endpoint of concurrency with E422
Rhineland-Palatinate	Trier-Saarburg	Mehring, Rhineland-Palatinate	135.0	83.9	–	Rioler Wald / Mehringer Höhe	Parking area Rioler Wald / Mehringer Höhe	
Rhineland-Palatinate	Trier-Saarburg	Mehring, Rhineland-Palatinate	137.3	85.3	131	Mehring	Mehring, Morbach, Thalfang, Mainz, Frankfurt-Hahn	
Rhineland-Palatinate	Trier-Saarburg	Reinsfeld	148.6	92.3	–	Raststätte "Hochwald"	Rest area "Hochwald"	
Rhineland-Palatinate	Trier-Saarburg	Hermeskeil	150.7	93.6	132	Reinsfeld	B 407 – Reinsfeld, Kell, Saarburg, Hunsrückhöhenstraße	
Rhineland-Palatinate	Trier-Saarburg	Hermeskeil	152.8	94.9	133	Hermeskeil	B 52 – Hermeskeil	B 52 signed northbound only
Rhineland-Palatinate	Trier-Saarburg	Hermeskeil	155.0	96.3	–	Katzenberg / Steiner Wald	Parking area Katzenberg / Steiner Wald	
Saarland	Sankt Wendel (district)	Nonnweiler	159.9	99.4	134	Nonnweiler-Bierfeld	Nonnweiler, Losheim am See, Weiskirchen, Wadern	
Saarland	Sankt Wendel (district)	Nonnweiler	162.3	100.8	135	Dreieck Nonnweiler	A 62 – Pirmasens, Kaiserslautern ( A 6), Otzenhausen	Southbound exit and northbound entrance only
Saarland	Sankt Wendel (district)	Nonnweiler	162.5	101.0	136	Otzenhausen	Otzenhausen, A 62 – Pirmasens, Kaiserslautern	Northbound exit and southbound entrance only
Saarland	Sankt Wendel (district)	Nonnweiler	164.5	102.2	137	Braunshausen	Braunshausen, Wadern, Kastel	
Saarland	Sankt Wendel (district)	Nonnweiler	166.2	103.3	–	Kastel	Parking area Kastel	Southbound only
Saarland	Sankt Wendel (district)	Nonnweiler	169.2	105.1	–	Peterberg	Parking area Peterberg	Northbound only
Saarland	Sankt Wendel (district)	Tholey	172.4	107.1	138	Primstal	Primstal, St. Wendel, Oberthal, Theley, Weiskirchen, Bostalsee	St. Wendel, Oberthal, Theley signed southbound only; Weiskirchen, Bostalsee signed northbound only
Saarland	Sankt Wendel (district)	Tholey	173.9	108.1	–	Sombach-Mühle	Parking area Sombach-Mühle	
Saarland	Sankt Wendel (district)	Tholey	175.8	109.2	139	Tholey-Hasborn	Hasborn, Tholey, Büschfeld, Theley	
Saarland	Sankt Wendel (district)	Tholey	178.8	111.1	–	Schaumberg-Kreuz	Parking area Schaumberg-Kreuz	
Saarland	Sankt Wendel (district)	Tholey	179.8	111.7	140	Tholey	B 269 – Tholey, St. Wendel, Schmelz, Lebach	
Saarland	Saarlouis (district)	Lebach	182.5	113.4	–	Schellenbach	Parking area Schellenbach	
Saarland	Neunkirchen (German district)	Eppelborn	185.6	115.3	141	Eppelborn	B 10 – Eppelborn, Marpingen, Dirmingen	
Saarland	Neunkirchen (German district)	Illingen, Saarland	190.9	118.6	142	Illingen	Illingen, Ottweiler, Uchtelfangen, Wiesbach	
Saarland	Neunkirchen (German district)	Illingen, Saarland	194.6	120.9	143	Kreuz Saarbrücken	A 8 – Karlsruhe, Saarbrücken ( A 623), Neunkirchen, Saarbrücken Airport, Luxembourg, Saarlouis	A 623 signed northbound only; Karlsruhe signed southbound only
Saarland	Saarbrücken (district)	Heusweiler	196.5	122.1	144	Quierschied	Quierschied, Merchweiler, Göttelborn, Holz	Holz signed southbound only
Saarland	Saarbrücken (district)	Saarbrücken	199.8	124.1	145	Holz	Holz	Southbound entrance and northbound exit only
Saarland	Saarbrücken (district)	Saarbrücken	201.1	125.0	–	Neuhaus	Parking area Neuhaus	
Saarland	Saarbrücken (district)	Saarbrücken	202.8	126.0	146	Riegelsberg	Riegelsberg, Püttlingen, Völklingen, Fischbach	Connection to B 268
Saarland	Saarbrücken (district)	Saarbrücken	204.1	126.8	147	Saarbrücken-Neuhaus	B 268 – Saarbrücken-Neuhaus, Riegelsberg-Süd	Northbound exit and southbound entrance only
Saarland	Saarbrücken (district)	Saarbrücken	205.4	127.6	148	Saarbrücken-Von der Heydt	Saarbrücken-Von der Heydt, -Kirschheck	
Saarland	Saarbrücken (district)	Saarbrücken	207.1	128.7	150	Saarbrücken-Burbach	Saarbrücken-Burbach	Southbound exit and northbound entrance only
Saarland	Saarbrücken (district)	Saarbrücken	207.1	128.7			B 268 – Saarbrücken	Southern endpoint of motorway
Saarland	Saarbrücken (district)	Saarbrücken	207.1	128.7				Southern endpoint of concurrency with E422
1.000 mi = 1.609 km; 1.000 km = 0.621 mi: Concurrency terminus; Incomplete access; Proposed; Route transition
