= Bundesautobahn 602 =

Federal motorway in Germany

A 602
- Bundesautobahn 602

Route information
- Length: 10.5 km (6.5 mi)

Location
- Country: Germany
- States: Rhineland-Palatinate

Highway system
- Roads in Germany; Autobahns; List; Federal; List; State; E-roads

Bundesautobahn 602 (translates from German as Federal Motorway 602, short form Autobahn 602, abbreviated as BAB 602 or A 602) is an autobahn in southwestern Germany. It connects the city of Trier to the autobahn A 1.

== Exit list ==
(1)	Trier-Verteilerkreis B 49
	Trier-Ruwer (planned)
(2)	Trier-Ehrang B 52 E44
(3)	Kenn
(-)	Moseltal/Schweich
	slope-bridge Schweich 800 m
(-)	Longuich
(-)	Moseltal 3-way interchange A 1 E44 E422
