= Bundesautobahn 255 =

Federal motorway in Germany

A 255
- Bundesautobahn 255

Route information
- Length: 2 km (1.2 mi)

Location
- Country: Germany
- States: Hamburg

Highway system
- Roads in Germany; Autobahns; List; Federal; List; State; E-roads

Bundesautobahn 255 (translates from German as Federal Motorway 255, short form Autobahn 255, abbreviated as BAB 255 or A 255) is a short motorway in Hamburg, in north Germany. It connects the A 1 with the B 75 and B 4 at the Neue Elbbrücken (new Elbe bridge).

== Exit list ==
| B 4 B 75 | Neue Elbbrücken |
| (1) | Hamburg-Veddel |
| (2) | Hamburg-Süd 4-way interchange A 252 |
| (2) | Hamburg-Süd 4-way interchange A 1 E22 |
