= Bundesautobahn 261 =

Federal motorway in Germany

Coordinates: 53°24′20″N 9°54′43″E

A 261
- Bundesautobahn 261

Route information
- Length: 7 km (4.3 mi)

Location
- Country: Germany
- States: Hamburg, Lower Saxony

Highway system
- Roads in Germany; Autobahns; List; Federal; List; State; E-roads

Bundesautobahn 261 (translates from German as Federal Motorway 261, short form Autobahn 261, abbreviated as BAB 261 or A 261) is an autobahn located between Hamburg and Buchholz in der Nordheide. It connects the A 7 with the A 1.

== Exit list ==
(1)	Hamburg-Südwest 3-way interchange A 7
(2)	Hamburg-Marmstorf
(3)	Tötensen (Rosengarten)
	Rest area ?/Rosengarten
(4)	Buchholzer Dreieck A 1
