= Bundesautobahn 252 =

Former federal motorway in Germany

A 252
- Bundesautobahn 252

Route information
- Length: 1.5 km (0.93 mi)
- History: Downgraded to B 75 in 2019

Location
- Country: Germany
- States: Hamburg

Highway system
- Roads in Germany; Autobahns; List; Federal; List; State; E-roads

Bundesautobahn 252 (translates from German as Federal Motorway 252, short form Autobahn 252, abbreviated as BAB 252 or A 252) is a planned short motorway in Hamburg in northern Germany.

The A 252 is called Hafenquerspange (port link road) and planned to connect the A 1 and A 7. It is planned to be finished in 2013. Following the rerouting of Wilhelm Reichsstraße, the A252 was downgraded to B 75 on 6 October 2019.

== Exit list ==
Intersection		3-way interchange Hamburg-Hafen (planned) A 7 E45
		Bridge 5000 m (planned)
		Hamburg-Steinwerder (planned)
Intersection		3-way interchange Hamburg-Wilhelmsburg-Nord (planned) A 253
		Connection to A 253 with B 4 B 75
	(4)	Hamburg-Georgswerder
	(5)	Hamburg-Süd 4-way interchange A 1 A 255 E22
