= Kreuz Hamburg-Ost =

Location
- Hamburg, Germany
- Coordinates: 53°14′44.16″N 14°0′42.88″E: A 1 E22; A 24 E26

Construction
- Type: Basketweave interchange with 2 direct links
- Lanes: 2x2/2x3
- Opened: 1937/1963

The Kreuz Hamburg-Ost (German: Kreuz Hamburg-Ost) is a basketweave interchange with two semi-direct links in the German states Schleswig-Holstein and Hamburg.

The motorway interchange forms the connection between the A1 Heiligenhafen-Saarbrücken and the A24 Hamburg-Dreieck Havelland.

== Geography ==
The motorway interchange lays in the municipal area of Barsbüttel in the Kreis Stormarn near the border with the state Hamburg. Nearby villages are Oststeinbek and Glinde. Nearby city districts of Hamburg are Billstedt, Jenfeld, Rahlstedt and Tonndorf. The motorway interchange lays approximately 10 km east of the city centre of Hamburg.

The border between Schleswig-Holstein and Hamburg runs through the southwestern part of the motorway interchange, but the biggest part of it lays in Schleswig-Holstein.

== History ==
The A24 to the west (Hamburg) as well as the A 1 to the north (Lübeck) were opened to traffic in 1937.

The finished tunnel of the interchange was not used for traffic during the war; instead it was converted into a bomb shelter for the production of airplane-parts. For this purpose the exits were blocked by brick walls, and the interior of tunnel was divided in three rooms. After the war it was used by British pioneers.

In 1963 the tunnel opened to traffic together with the A1 to the south (Bremen / Hannover). The motorway interchange was completed when the A 24 towards East Germany and Berlin opened to traffic.

Between 2001 and 2007 the interchange as well as the tunnel were completely remediated so they could better handle the heavier traffic. Due to the remediation of the tunnel they had to close the A1 for three months.

== Building form and road layout ==
Near the interchange the A 1 has a 2×3 lane layout, die A 24 vierstreifig. The relations between A 24 west—A 1 south have one lane; all the other connections have two lanes. At the interchange they miss the connections Berlin—Lübeck vice versa; these can be taken via the B 404 at Kreuz Bargteheide.

The motorway interchange is built as a basketweave interchange with two semi-direct links.

== Traffic near the interchange ==
Approximately 140.000 vehicles use the interchange on a daily basis.

From	To	Average daily traffic	Percentage of heavy traffic.
AS Barsbüttel (A 1)	AK Hamburg-Ost	81.600	11,8 %
AK Hamburg-Ost	AS Hamburg-Öjendorf (A 1)	91.900	17,1 %
AS Hamburg-Jenfeld (A 24)	AK Hamburg-Ost	58.600	3,5 %
AK Hamburg-Ost	AS Reinbek (A 24)	49.200	10,3 %
