= Halvesbostel =

- Municipality
- Coat of arms

- Location of Halvesbostel within Harburg district
- Interactive map of Halvesbostel
- Location within Germany Location within Lower Saxony
- Coordinates: 53°21′N 09°36′E
- Country: Germany
- State: Lower Saxony
- District: Harburg
- Municipal assoc.: Hollenstedt
- Subdivisions: 2

Government
  - Mayor: Jürgen Wickbold

Area
  - Total: 18.14 km^{2} (7.00 sq mi)
- Elevation: 38 m (125 ft)

Population (2025-12-31)
  - Total: 797
  - Density: 43.9/km^{2} (114/sq mi)
- Time zone: UTC+01:00 (CET)
  - Summer (DST): UTC+02:00 (CEST)
- Postal codes: 21646
- Dialling codes: 04169
- Vehicle registration: WL

Halvesbostel is a municipality in the district of Harburg, in Lower Saxony, Germany.
