= Kellenhusen =

- Municipality
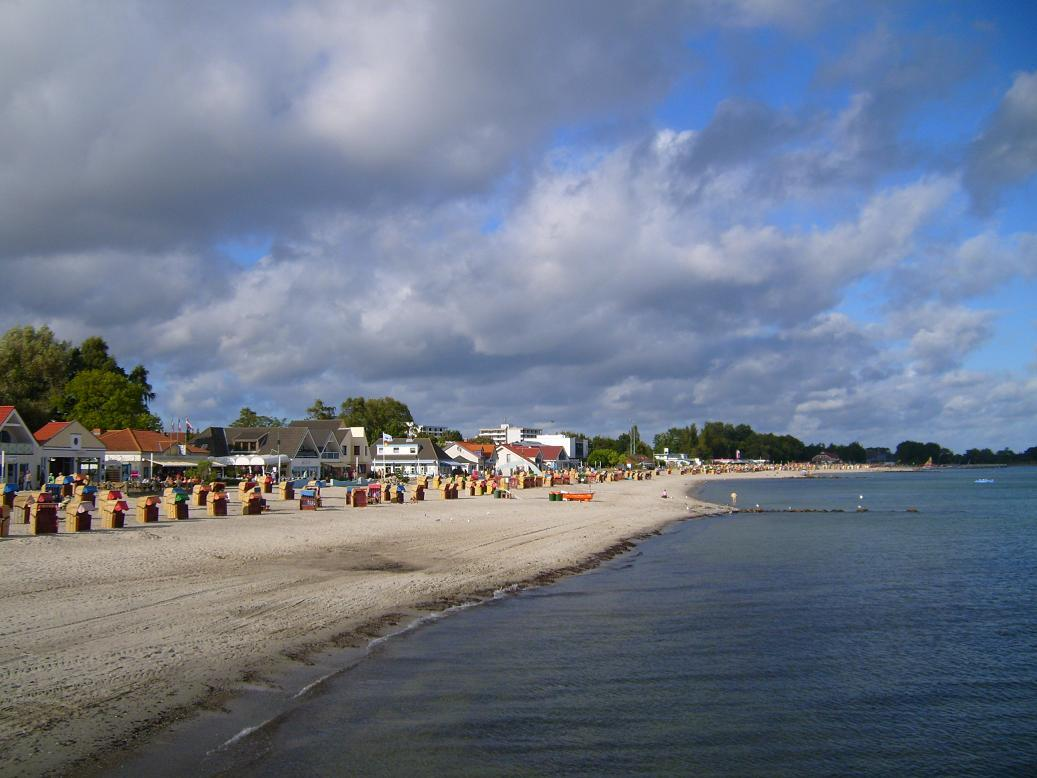
- Beach in Kellenhusen

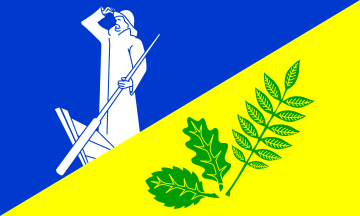
- Flag Coat of arms

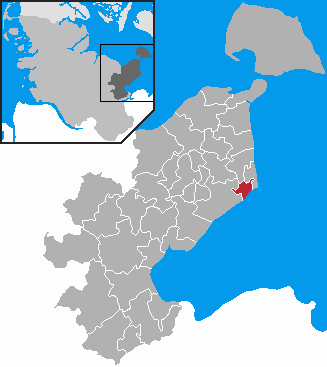
- Location of Kellenhusen within Ostholstein district
- Interactive map of Kellenhusen
- Location within Germany Location within Schleswig-Holstein
- Coordinates: 54°11′N 11°4′E
- Country: Germany
- State: Schleswig-Holstein
- District: Ostholstein

Government
  - Mayor: Ingelore Kohlert

Area
  - Total: 8.15 km^{2} (3.15 sq mi)
- Elevation: 0 m (0 ft)

Population (2025-12-31)
  - Total: 1,234
  - Density: 151/km^{2} (392/sq mi)
- Time zone: UTC+01:00 (CET)
  - Summer (DST): UTC+02:00 (CEST)
- Postal codes: 23746
- Dialling codes: 04364
- Vehicle registration: OH

Kellenhusen is a municipality in the district of Ostholstein, in Schleswig-Holstein, Germany.
