= Elsdorf, Lower Saxony =

Elsdorf
- Municipality
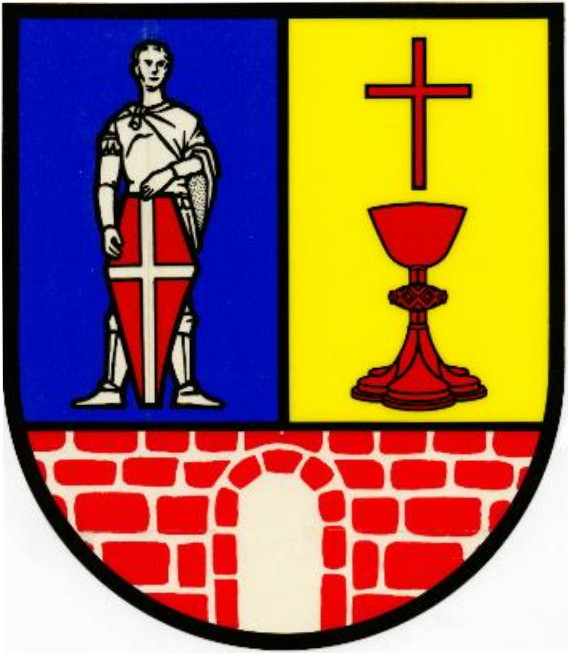
- Coat of arms

- Location of Elsdorf within Rotenburg (Wümme) district
- Interactive map of Elsdorf
- Location within Germany Location within Lower Saxony
- Coordinates: 53°14′33″N 09°21′02″E
- Country: Germany
- State: Lower Saxony
- District: Rotenburg (Wümme)
- Municipal assoc.: Zeven
- Subdivisions: 10

Government
  - Mayor: Heinrich Willenbrock (CDU)

Area
  - Total: 49.1 km^{2} (19.0 sq mi)
- Elevation: 19 m (62 ft)

Population (2025-12-31)
  - Total: 2,040
  - Density: 41.5/km^{2} (108/sq mi)
- Time zone: UTC+01:00 (CET)
  - Summer (DST): UTC+02:00 (CEST)
- Postal codes: 27404
- Dialling codes: 04281, 04282, 04286
- Vehicle registration: ROW
- Website: www.zeven.de

Elsdorf (German pronunciation: [ˈɛlsˌdɔʁf]) is a municipality in the district of Rotenburg, in Lower Saxony, Germany.

== History ==
Elsdorf belonged - as to its government - to the Prince-Archbishopric of Bremen, established in 1180. In religious respect, however, Elsdorf formed part of the Roman Catholic Diocese of Verden until after 1566 its incumbent bishops lost papal recognition, except of a last Catholic bishop from 1630 to 1631, respectively. In 1648 the Prince-Archbishopric was transformed into the Duchy of Bremen, which was first ruled in personal union by the Swedish and from 1715 on by the Hanoverian Crown. In 1823 the Duchy was abolished and its territory became part of the Stade Region.
