= European route E422 =

Road in trans-European E-road network

E422

Route information
- Length: 95 km (59 mi)

Major junctions
- From: Trier
- To: Saarbrücken

Location
- Countries: Germany

Highway system
- International E-road network; A Class; B Class

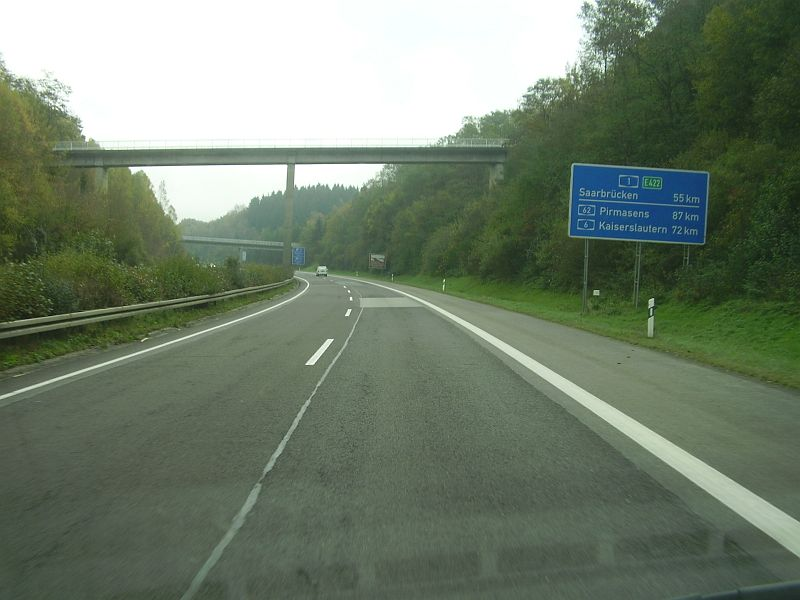
Roughly midpoint of E422 southbound

European route E 422 is part of the international E-road network.

== Route ==
Trier — Saarbrücken

- Germany
  - E44 Trier
  - E29, E50 Saarbrücken
