= Bundesautobahn 623 =

Federal motorway in Germany

A 623
- Bundesautobahn 623

Route information
- Length: 11.9 km (7.4 mi)

Major junctions
- North end: Friedrichsthal
- South end: Saarbrücken

Location
- Country: Germany
- States: Saarland

Highway system
- Roads in Germany; Autobahns; List; Federal; List; State; E-roads

Bundesautobahn 623 (translates from German as Federal Motorway 623, short form Autobahn 623, abbreviated as BAB 623 or A 623) is an autobahn in Germany.

The A 623 is a spur connecting the A 8 to Saarbrücken. As with the A 1 to the west, the A 623 does not enter the inner city. Connections to arteries into Saarbrücken are made at the final two junctions. Junction 7 offers a connection to the Camphauser Straße expressway, which leads to the B 268 and the B 51. The road also continues past junction 8 into Saarbrücken, but as the B 41. The section of B 41 immediately after junction 8, about 1.2 km, is a short Kraftfahrstrasse (expressway).

The entirety of the A 623 was once part of the B 41. When the road was designated as an autobahn, the B 41 designation remained. The concurrency is indicated on all distance signs along the A 623, a rarity for German roads. The concurrency continues a further three junctions to the east along the A 8.

There is no junction 6 along the A 623. This was to be the connection point with a proposed alignment of the A 1 into Saarbrücken. The planned route of the A 1 would have diverged from a location near that road's present-day junction 148 (Saarbrücken-Von der Heydt), then connecting with the A 623, continuing down the Camphauser Straße expressway, through Saarbrücken, and across the Westspange bridge to end at the A 620. For the same reason, the A 1 has no junction 149.

== Exit list ==
State	District	Location	km	mi	Exit	Name	Destinations	Notes
Saarland	Saarbrücken (district)	Sulzbach (Saar)	9.8	6.1	1	Dreieck Friedrichsthal	A 8 – Luxembourg, Saarlouis, Trier, Karlsruhe, Mannheim, Neunkirchen	Northern terminus
Saarland	Saarbrücken (district)	Friedrichsthal	9.3	5.8	2	Altenwald	Altenwald, Hühnerfeld, Friedrichsthal	Southbound exit and entrance only
Saarland	Saarbrücken (district)	Friedrichsthal	8.7	5.4	2	Altenwald	Altenwald, Hühnerfeld, Friedrichsthal	Northbound exit and entrance only
Saarland	Saarbrücken (district)	Sulzbach (Saar)	7.1	4.4	3	Sulzbach	Sulzbach, Quierschied	Southbound exit and entrance only
Saarland	Saarbrücken (district)	Sulzbach (Saar)	6.3	3.9	3	Sulzbach	Sulzbach, Quierschied	Northbound exit and entrance only
Saarland	Saarbrücken (district)	Saarbrücken	4.6	2.9	4	Saarbrücken-Dudweiler	L255 – Dudweiler, Fischbach, Camphausen	
Saarland	Saarbrücken (district)	Saarbrücken	3.2	2.0	5	Saarbrücken-Herrensohr	L256 – Herrensohr, Fischbach	Northbound exit and southbound entrance only
Saarland	Saarbrücken (district)	Saarbrücken	0	0.0	7	Dreieck Dicke Buche	B 41 – Saarbrücken-St. Johann	Northbound entrance and southbound exit only
Saarland	Saarbrücken (district)	Saarbrücken	0	0.0	7	Dreieck Dicke Buche	Camphauser Straße – Metz, Saarbrücken	Southern terminus
1.000 mi = 1.609 km; 1.000 km = 0.621 mi: Concurrency terminus; Incomplete access; Proposed; Route transition
