= Bundesautobahn 388 =

Federal motorway in Germany

A 388
- Bundesautobahn 388

Route information
- Length: 4 km (2.5 mi)
- History: Downgraded to B 27 in 2003

Location
- Country: Germany
- States: Lower Saxony

Highway system
- Roads in Germany; Autobahns; List; Federal; List; State; E-roads

Bundesautobahn 388 (translates from German as Federal Motorway 388, short form Autobahn 388, abbreviated as BAB 388 or A 388) was an autobahn spur in Göttingen. It has now been downgraded and made part of the Bundesstraße 27, as the A 38 has recently been finished. The A 388 was supposed to be the first part of the A 38, branching off the A 7 in the North of Göttingen, however plans were carried out differently and the A 38 now meets with the A 7 near Friedland.

== Exit list ==
Legend:

- I/C - Interchange, I/S - Intersection, RSA - Rest and service area, OBR - Overhead bridge restaurant, R/R - Restaurant and rest plaza, L/B - Layby, V/P - Vista point, TN - tunnel, T/P - Toll plaza, BR - Bridge
- C - Cloverleaf, S - Stack, T-A - Trumpet-A, T-B - Trumpet-B, DT - Directional-T/Y, SDT - Semi-Directional-T/Y, P-Y - Partial-Y, D - Diamond, P-C - Partial cloverleaf, D-D - Diverging diamond, D-R - Direct ramp

Location	km	mi	Exit	Name	Destinations	Notes
Göttingen			1	Göttingen-Nord	A 7	
Göttingen				Göttingen-Holtensen		
Göttingen				Göttingen-Lutteranger		
Göttingen				Göttingen-Weende		
1.000 mi = 1.609 km; 1.000 km = 0.621 mi
