= A250 =

A250 may refer to:

- A250, an A road in Zone 2 of the Great Britain numbering scheme
- Alia A250, an all-electric vertical take-off and landing aircraft; see Beta Technologies Alia § Variants
- Airbus A250, a former designation for the Airbus A300 aircraft
- Bundesautobahn 250, or A 250, a former autobahn in northern Germany
- Daihatsu Rocky A250, a subcompact crossover SUV manufactured by Daihatsu; see Daihatsu Rocky (A200)
