= List of autobahns in Germany =

Interactive map of autobahns in Germany

The German federal motorways are now numbered according to a clear system. Since the mid-1970s there has been a numbering system for motorways, which sets out which number is replaced by a new motorway. Motorways with a single-digit number (e.g. A 1) are of national or even cross-border significance. Highways with a two-digit number (e.g. A 20) are usually of overriding national importance. Highways with three digits (e.g. A 999) are generally of regional or urban significance; often these motorways are feeders or detours. If there is more than one digit, the first digit indicates the approximate location of the motorway (A 10 to A 19 for Berlin; A 20 in the north to A99 in the south, A 100 for Berlin; A 200 in the north to A 999 in the south). Usually highways with even numbers predominantly run east–west, and those with odd numbers run north–south. Exceptions include the A3, A14, A15 and the A25.

== A 1 to A 9 ==
Highway shield	Expressway Name	Connects	Length (km)	Length (mi)	Status	Map
A 1	Vogelfluglinie, Hansalinie, Ruhrtangente, Kölner Ring, Eifelautobahn	Heiligenhafen – Lübeck – Hamburg – Bremen – Osnabrück – Münster – Hamm – Dortmund – Hagen – Wuppertal – Remscheid – Leverkusen – Cologne – Blankenheim Kelberg – Trier – Saarbrücken	748	465	current under construction: Danish border – Puttgarden planned: Blankenheim – Kelberg	
A 2	Warschauer Allee, Schalkeschleichweg	Oberhausen – Bottrop – Gelsenkirchen – Recklinghausen – Dortmund – Hamm − Bielefeld – Hannover – Braunschweig – Magdeburg – AD Werder	473	294	current	
A 3	Hollandlinie, Rechtsrheinische Autobahn, Kölner Ring, Spessartautobahn, Donautalautobahn	(Arnhem A12 –) Emmerich – Oberhausen – Duisburg – Düsseldorf – Leverkusen – Cologne – Limburg an der Lahn – Wiesbaden – Frankfurt − Aschaffenburg – Würzburg – Nuremberg – Regensburg – Deggendorf – Passau (– A8 Linz)	769	478	current	
A 4	Hollandlinie, Kölner Ring, Oberbergische Straße	(Maastricht A76 –) Aachen – Cologne – Olpe – Krombach AD Kirchheim – Eisenach – Erfurt – Jena – Gera – Chemnitz – Dresden – Görlitz (– A4 Wrocław)	583	362	current	
A 5	HaFraBa, Bergstraßenautobahn, Rheintalautobahn, Rechtsrheinische Autobahn	AD Hattenbach – Frankfurt – Darmstadt – Heidelberg – Karlsruhe – Freiburg im Breisgau – Weil am Rhein (– Basel A2) (Mulhouse A36 –) AD Neuenburg	440	270	current	
A 6	Neckarlinie, Kraichgau-Autobahn, Via Carolina	(Paris A320 –) Saarbrücken – Kaiserslautern – Mannheim – Heilbronn – Nuremberg – Amberg – Waidhaus (– Prague D5)	484	301	current	
A 7	HaFraBa, Nord-Süd-Achse, Rhönautobahn / -linie	(Aarhus E45 –) Flensburg – Neumünster – Hamburg – Hannover – Göttingen – Kassel – AD Hattenbach – Fulda – Würzburg – Ulm – Memmingen – Füssen (– Reutte/Fernpass)	962	598	current	
A 8	Saar-Autobahn, Albauf- bzw. -abstieg, Salzburger/Wiener Autobahn	(Luxembourg A13 –) Perl – Saarlouis – Neunkirchen (Saar) – Pirmasens Karlsruhe – Stuttgart – Ulm – Augsburg – Munich Munich – Rosenheim − Bad Reichenhall/Piding (– Salzburg A1)	505	314	current	
A 9	MüLeiBerl, Berliner Autobahn, Nürnberger Autobahn	AD Potsdam – Dessau – Leipzig – Hof – Bayreuth – Nuremberg – Ingolstadt – Munich	530	330	current	
Total Length			5,494	3,414		

== A 10 to A 19 ==
Highway shield	Expressway Name	Connects	Length (km)	Length (mi)	Status	Map
A 10	Berliner Ring	AD Barnim – AD Spreeau – AD Potsdam – AD Werder – AD Havelland – AD Kreuz Oranienburg – AD Barnim	196	122	current	
A 11	Berlinka	(A6 Szczecin–) Pomellen – Eberswalde – AD Barnim	110	68	current	
A 12	Autobahn der Freiheit	AD Spreeau – Frankfurt (Oder) (– A2 Poznań)	58	36	current	
A 13		AK Schönefeld – Lübbenau/Spreewald – Senftenberg – Dresden	151	94	current	
A 14	Altmarkautobahn, Mitteldeutsche Schleife	Wismar – Schwerin – Ludwigslust – Karstädt Lüderitz – Wolmirstedt Magdeburg – Halle – Leipzig – AD Nossen	341	212	current under construction and planned: Karstädt – Stendal – Lüderitz under construction: Wolmirstedt – Magdeburg	
A 15	Spreewaldautobahn	Lübbenau/Spreewald – Cottbus – Forst (– A18 Wrocław)	64	40	current	
A 16	Leipzig-Lausitz-Achse	Leipzig – Torgau – Hoyerswerda – Weißwasser (– A18 Wrocław)			Planning abandoned; cancelled by 2011	
A 17	Via Porta Bohemica / Prager Autobahn	Dresden – Heidenau – Pirna – Bad Gottleuba (– D8 Prague)	45	28	current	
A 17		Bautzen – Zittau (– D35 Liberec)			Cancelled in the 1990s Partially built as B 178	
A 18	Lausitzautobahn	Cottbus – Görlitz – Zittau			Cancelled by 1992; Partially built as B 99 and B 115	
A 19		Rostock – AD Wittstock/Dosse	123	76	current	
Total Length			1,088	676		

== A 20 to A 29 ==
Highway shield	Expressway Name	Connects	Length (km)	Length (mi)	Status	Map
A 20	Küstenautobahn, Nordwestumfahrung Hamburg, Ostseeautobahn	Bad Segeberg – Lübeck – Wismar – Rostock – Greifswald – Neubrandenburg – AD Kreuz Uckermark	345	214	current planned: Westerstede – Bremerhaven – Glückstadt – Bad Segeberg	
A 21	Ostumfahrung Hamburg	Klein Barkau – AK Bargteheide	64	40	current planned: Kiel – Klein Barkau planned: Bargteheide – Geesthacht – AD Handorf	
A 22	Küstenautobahn	Westerstede – Bremerhaven – Stade			Planning abandoned Absorbed into the A 20 in 2010	
A 23	Westküstenautobahn	Heide – Itzehoe – Pinneberg – Hamburg	96	60	current	
A 24		Hamburg – AK Schwerin – AD Wittstock/Dosse – AD Havelland (Berlin)	237	147	current	
A 25	Marschenlinie	Hamburg – Geesthacht	18	11	current planned: Geesthacht – Geesthacht-Nord	
A 26	Altes-Land-Autobahn, Hafenquerspange	Stade – Neu Wulmstorf	25	16	current planned: Drochtersen – Stade under construction: Neu Wulmstorf – AK Hamburg-Hafen planned: AK Hamburg-Hafen – AD Hamburg-Stillhorn	
A 27	Schellfischlinie, Blocklandlinie / -autobahn	Cuxhaven – Bremerhaven – Bremen – Walsrode	162	101	current	
A 28	Ostfriesenhighway	Leer – Westerstede – Oldenburg – Stuhr (– Bremen)	97	60	current	
A 29	Jadelinie	Wilhelmshaven – Oldenburg – AD Ahlhorner Heide	95	59	current	
Total Length			1,139	708		

== A 30 to A 39 ==
Highway shield	Expressway Name	Connects	Length (km)	Length (mi)	Status	Map
A 30		(Amsterdam A1 –) Bad Bentheim – Rheine – Osnabrück – Bad Oeynhausen	136	85	current	
A 31	Emslandautobahn, (Ost-)Friesenspieß	Emden – Lingen – Gronau – Bottrop	241	150	current	
A 32		Schwarmstedt – Celle – Wolfsburg			Cancelled in 1980; never built	
A 33	Teutoburger-Wald-Autobahn, Senne-Autobahn	Osnabrück – Halle – Bielefeld – Paderborn – AK Wünnenberg-Haaren	104	65	current planned: AD Wallenhorst – Osnabrück-Widukindland	
A 35		Nienburg – Hannover – Hameln – Bielefeld			Cancelled in 1980; Partially built as B 6, B 61 and partially as B 66	
A 36	Nordharzautobahn	Braunschweig – Goslar – Wernigerode – Bernburg	120	75	current Former A 395 and former portion of B 6	
A 36		Hameln – Alfeld – Goslar			Cancelled in 1980; Partially built as B 6 and B 82	
A 37	Messeschnellweg, Messestutzen	Burgdorf – Hannover-Misburg Hannover Messe – AD Hannover-Süd	14	8.7	current	
A 38	Südharzautobahn, Südumgehung Leipzig, Mitteldeutsche Schleife	AD Drammetal – Nordhausen – Halle (Saale) – Leipzig – AD Parthenaue	219	136	current	
A 39	Maschener Autobahn, Nordlandautobahn	Maschener Kreuz – Lüneburg Wolfsburg – Braunschweig – AD Salzgitter	99	62	current planned: Lüneburg – Wolfsburg	
Total Length			933	580		

== A 40 to A 49 ==
Highway shield	Expressway Name	Connects	Length (km)	Length (mi)	Status	Map
A 40	Ruhrschnellweg / Ruhrschleichweg	(Venlo A67 –) Moers – Duisburg – Mülheim an der Ruhr – Essen – Bochum – Dortmund	95	59	current under construction and planned: Dortmund – AK Dortmund/Unna	
A 40	Lipperandstraße / Lippeschnellweg	Kamp-Lintfort – Dinslaken – Marl – Lünen – Hamm – Beckum			Cancelled by 1986	
A 41	Nord-Süd-Autobahn Gelsenkirchen	Dorsten – Gelsenkirchen – Essen – Sprockhövel			Cancelled in 1980; Partially built as A 52 and L 608	
A 42	Emscherschnellweg / Schalkeschleichweg	Kamp-Lintfort – Duisburg – Oberhausen – Bottrop – Gelsenkirchen – Herne – Castrop-Rauxel – Dortmund	58	36	current	
A 43		Münster – Marl – Recklinghausen – Herne – Bochum – Witten – Wuppertal	93	58	current	
A 44	Belgienlinie, (DüBoDo partially replaced by A 448), Hellweglinie	(Lüttich A3) – Aachen – Mönchengladbach-Odenkirchen Mönchengladbach-Ost – Düsseldorf – Ratingen Heiligenhaus – Essen-Heisingen Holzwickede – Soest– Kassel Helsa – Sontra-West Sontra-Ost - AD Wommen	307	191	current under construction: Ratingen – Heiligenhaus planned: Kassel – Helsa under construction: Sontra-West – Sontra-Ost	
A 45	Dortmunder Ring, Sauerlandautobahn / -linie, Siegerlandautobahn, Wetteraulinie	Dortmund – Siegen – Gießen – Hanau – Aschaffenburg	257	160	current	
A 46	Wupperschnellweg, Hochsauerlandlinie, Ruhrtalautobahn	Heinsberg – Neuss – Düsseldorf – Wuppertal Hagen – Hemer Arnsberg – Olsberg	149	93	current planned: Hemer – Menden	
A 47		Bielefeld – Gütersloh – Lippstadt – Erwitte			Cancelled in 1980; Partially built as B 55, B 61, and B 239	
A 48	Eifelautobahn, Westerwaldautobahn	AD Vulkaneifel – Koblenz – AD Dernbach	78	48	current	
A 49	Lohfeldener Rüssel / Rüsselschwenk, Südtangente Kassel	Kassel – Schwalmstadt – Homberg (Ohm)	87	54	current	
Total Length			1,124	698		

== A 50 to A 59 ==
Highway shield	Expressway Name	Connects	Length (km)	Length (mi)	Status	Map
A 50	Oberbergische Straße	Aachen – Olpe			Planned number for the western extension of the A 4 from Olpe if extension plans were abandoned, but this never happened; became a portion of A 4 in the 1970s	
A 51		Duisburg – Krefeld – Viersen – Hückelhoven – Aachen			Cancelled in 1986; Partially constructed as B 509	
A 52		(Roermond N280–) Mönchengladbach – Neuss Düsseldorf – Essen Gelsenkirchen – Marl	97	60	current planned: Essen – Gelsenkirchen	
A 53		(Liège A3–) Aachen – Düsseldorf			Became a portion of A 44 in 1976	
A 54	Viehbachtalstraße, Stadtautobahn Solingen	(Heerlen –) Jülich – Solingen – Lüdenscheid – Werdohl			Cancelled in 1986; Partially constructed as A 542, B 55 and L 141n	
A 55		Goch – Kempen – Krefeld – Grevenbroich – Hürth			Cancelled in 1980 because it ran parallel to the A 57; never built	
A 56	Ennertaufstieg	Selfkant – Jülich – Düren – Euskirchen – Bonn – Waldbröl			Cancelled in 1986; Partially constructed as A 562 and B 56	
A 57	Niederrheinautobahn / Trans-Niederrhein-Magistrale, Linksrheinische Autobahn	(Nijmegen A77 –) Goch – Moers – Krefeld – Neuss – Köln	119	74	current	
A 59	Nord-Süd-Straße, Flughafenautobahn	Dinslaken – Duisburg Düsseldorf – Leverkusen Cologne – Bonn	69	43	current	
Total Length			285	177		

== A 60 to A 69 ==
Highway shield	Expressway Name	Connects	Length (km)	Length (mi)	Status	Map
A 60	Mainzer Ring (southern part)	(Liège A27–) Winterspelt – Wittlich Bingen – Mainz – Rüsselsheim	113	70	current	
A 61	Linksrheinische Autobahn	(Venlo A74 –) Kaldenkirchen – Mönchengladbach-Wanlo Jackerath – Bad Neuenahr-Ahrweiler – Koblenz – Bingen – Worms – Ludwigshafen – Hockenheim	313	194	current	
A 62		Nonnweiler – Pirmasens	79	49	current	
A 63		Mainz – Kaiserslautern	73	45	current	
A 64	Luxemburger Autobahn, Meulenwaldautobahn	(A1–) Grenzübergang Mesenich – Trier	18	11	current	
A 65	Pfälzer Autobahn	Ludwigshafen – Neustadt – Wörth	59	37	current	
A 66	Rhein-Main-Schnellweg, Kinzigtalautobahn, "Route 66", Mainzer Ring (northern part)	Wiesbaden – Frankfurt – Frankfurt-Miquelallee Frankfurt-Enkheim – Hanau – Fulda	126	78	current under construction: AD Erlenbruch – Frankfurt-Bergen-Enkheim	
A 67	Rechtsrheinische Autobahn	Rüsselsheim – Darmstadt – Viernheim	58	36	current	
A 69	Bienwaldautobahn	Schifferstadt – Germersheim – Wörth am Rhein (– Strasbourg A35)			Cancelled by 2016; Partially constructed as B 9	
Total Length			839	521		

== A 70 to A 79 ==
Highway shield	Expressway Name	Connects	Length (km)	Length (mi)	Status	Map
A 70	Maintalautobahn	Schweinfurt – Bamberg – Bayreuth	120	75	current	
A 71	Thüringer-Wald-Autobahn	Sangerhausen – Erfurt – Suhl – Schweinfurt	220	140	current	
A 72	Vogtlandautobahn	Hof – Zwickau – Chemnitz – Leipzig	169	105	current	
A 73	Frankenschnellweg (northern part) Südwesttangente (eastern part)	Suhl – Coburg – Bamberg – Erlangen – Nürnberg/Fürth Nürnberg-Hafen-Ost – Feucht	167	104	current	
A 75	Mittelfrankenautobahn	Baiersdorf – Nürnberg – Hilpoltstein			Cancelled in the early 1980s; never built	
A 77	Frankenschnellweg (southern part)	Nürnberg-Hafen – Weißenburg in Bayern – Donauwörth			Planning abandoned Partially constructed as B 2 and K N4	
Total Length			676	420		

== A 80 to A 89 ==
Highway shield	Expressway Name	Connects	Length (km)	Length (mi)	Status	Map
A 80	Filstalautobahn	Germersheim – Bruchsal – Stuttgart – Göppingen – Ulm – Senden			Cancelled in 1980; Partially constructed as B 10, B 28, and B 35	
A 81	Neckarlinie, Bodenseeautobahn, "Spätzle-Highway", Gipsstrecke	Würzburg – Heilbronn – Stuttgart – Sindelfingen – Villingen-Schwenningen – Singen – Gottmadingen (- B 34 (for 2 km) - Schaffhausen – Winterthur – Zurich) A4	276	171	current	
A 82		Karlsruhe – Pforzheim – Stuttgart			Cancelled in 1976; Partially built as A 8	
A 82		Mannheim – Heilbronn – Bruchsal			Cancelled in 1976; never built	
A 82		Göttingen – Halle (Saale)			Redesignated as A 38 and A 143	
A 83		Lauffen am Neckar – Stuttgart – Tübingen – Villingen-Schwenningen – Donaueschingen			Cancelled in 1980; Partially constructed as B 27	
A 84		(Strasbourg A35 –) Freudenstadt – Tübingen – Reutlingen – Kirchheim unter Teck			Cancelled in 1980; Partially constructed as B 28a	
A 85	Filderautobahn	Schwäbisch Hall – Stuttgart – Metzingen – Ravensburg			Cancelled in 1980; Partially constructed as B 14	
A 86	Schwarzwaldautobahn	Breisach – Freiburg im Breisgau – Donaueschingen – Tuttlingen – Riedlingen – Ulm – Langenau			Cancelled in 1980; Partially constructed as B 31, B 31a, and B 33	
A 87	Remstalautobahn	Stuttgart/Zuffenhausen Nord – Waiblingen – Schorndorf – Schwäbisch Gmünd – Aalen			Cancelled in 1980; Constructed as B 29	
A 88		Riedlingen – Biberach – Memmingen			Cancelled in 1980; Partially constructed as B 312	
A 89		Ulm – Biberach – Ravensburg – Friedrichshafen			Cancelled in 1980; under construction as B 30	
Total Length			276	171		

== A 90 to A 99 ==
Highway shield	Expressway Name	Connects	Length (km)	Length (mi)	Status	Map
A 90	Paartalautobahn	Aichach – Pfaffenhofen an der Ilm – AK Holledau – Saalhaupt			Cancelled by 1986; partially constructed as A 93 and B 300	
A 91	Reichsstädtelinie, Ries-Autobahn, Lechfeldautobahn	Feuchtwangen – Donauwörth – Augsburg – Landsberg am Lech – Füssen			Cancelled in 1980; partially constructed as B 2, B 17, and B 25	
A 92	Isarlinie, Flughafenzubringer	AD Munich-Feldmoching – Munich Airport – Landshut – Deggendorf	134	83	current	
A 93	Ostbayernautobahn, Inntalautobahn, Brennerautobahn	Hof – Weiden – Regensburg – AD Holledau Rosenheim – Kiefersfielden (– A12 Innsbruck)	268	167	current Planning abandoned: Regensburg – Rosenheim (became B 15n)	
A 94	Töginger Straße, Isentalautobahn	Munich – Burghausen Malching– Kirchham	109	68	current planned: Burghausen – Malching under construction: Kirchham – AK Pocking	
A 95	Garmischer Autobahn, Olympiastraße (in Munich)	Munich – Garmisch-Partenkirchen	69	43	current	
A 96	Lindauer Autobahn, Allgäuautobahn, Ammerseeautobahn	(Bregenz A14 –) Lindau – Memmingen – Landsberg – Munich	173	107	current	
A 98	Hochrheinautobahn, Bodenseeautobahn, Voralpenautobahn	Weil am Rhein – Rheinfelden-Ost Murg – Hauenstein Waldshut-Tiengen – Lauchringen Singen (Hohentwiel) – Stockach	47	29	current planned: Rheinfelden-Ost – Murg planned: Hauenstein – Waldshut-Tiengen	
A 99	Autobahnring München	AD München-Südwest – AK München-West – AK München-Nord – AK München-Ost – AK München-Süd AD München-Allach – AD München-Eschenried (Eschrieder Spange; unofficially A 99a)	58	36	current	
Total Length			858	533		

== A 100 to A 199 ==
Highway shield	Expressway Name	Connects	Length (km)	Length (mi)	Status	Map
A 100	Berlin Stadtring	Seestraße – AD Funkturm – AK Schöneberg – AD Neukölln – Am Treptower Park	24	15	current was A 10 from 1975-1990 planned: Am Treptower Park – Storkower Straße	
A 102	Zubringer Gradestraße	AK Tempelhof – Gradestraße			Became a branch of the A 100 in 2006 was A 12 from 1975–1990	
A 103	Abzweig Schöneberg	Sachsendamm – AK Schöneberg – Wolfensteindamm/Schloßstraße	4	2.5	current was A 13 from 1975–1990	
A 104	Autobahnzubringer Schmargendorf	Konstanzer Straße – AK Wilmersdorf – Schildhornstraße			Became a branch of the A 100 in 2006 was A 14 from 1975–1990	
A 105	Zubringer Kurt-Schumacher-Platz	AK Reinickendorf – Kurt-Schumacher-Damm			Became a branch of the A 111 in 2006 was A 11 from 1975–1990	
A 106	Südtangente Berlin	Schöneberg – Kreuzberg – Treptow – Köpenick			Never built was A 16 from 1975–1990	
A 107	Mitteltangente Berlin	Berlin-Tiergarten – Berlin-Mitte – Friedrichshain			Never built was A 17 from 1975–1990	
A 111	Zubringer Oranienburg	AD Kreuz Oranienburg – AD Charlottenburg	23	14	current was A 11 from 1975–1990	
A 113	Zubringer Schönefeld	AD Neukölln – AK Schönefeld	19	12	current	
A 114	Abzweig Berlin-Pankow	AD Pankow – Prenzlauer Promenade	9	5.6	current	
A 115	AVUS	AD Funkturm – Potsdam – AD Nuthetal	28	17	current was A 15 from 1975–1990	
A 117	Zubringer Dresden	AD Treptow – AD Waltersdorf	5	3.1	current Former section of A 113	
A 140	Südtangente Leipzig	AD Halle-Süd – Leipzig – AD Parthenaue			Constructed as a portion of A 38	
A 143	Westumfahrung Halle, Mitteldeutsche Schleife	Halle-Neustadt – AD Halle-Süd	9	5.6	current under construction: AD Halle-Nord – Halle-Neustadt	
Total Length			126	78		

== A 200 to A 299 ==
Highway shield	Expressway Name	Connects	Length (km)	Length (mi)	Status	Map
A 201	Rügenzubringer	Grimmen – Stralsund – Rügen			Planning abandoned; partially constructed as B 96n (now B 96)	
A 205		(Padborg E45–) Flensburg – Handewitt			Downgraded to B 200 in 1987	
A 210	Mettenhofzubringer	Rendsburg – AK Kiel-West	25	16	current	
A 215	Kieler Abzweig	Kiel – AD Bordesholm	23	14	current	
A 226		AD Bad Schwartau – Lübeck-Siems	5	3.1	current	
A 227		Lübeck-Zentrum – Lübeck-Travemünde			Planning abandoned; partially constructed as B 75	
A 241	Schweriner Anschluss	Wismar – Schwerin			Became a portion of A 14 in 2006	
A 250	Maschener Autobahn	Maschener Kreuz – Lüneburg			Became a portion of A 39 in 2010	
A 252	Hafen(quer)spange	Hamburg-Wilmhelmsburg – AK Hamburg-Süd			Downgraded to B 75 in 2019	
A 253	Harburger Umgehung	Hamburg-Wilhelmsburg – Hamburg-Harburg			Downgraded to B 75 in 2019	
A 255	Abzweig Veddel	Hamburg-Veddel – AK Hamburg-Süd	2	1.2	current	
A 261	Eckverbindung Harburg	AD Hamburg-Südwest – Buchholzer Dreieck	9	5.6	current	
A 263		Schwarzenbek – Lüneburg			Planning abandoned; constructed as B 404; Under planning as a portion of A 21	
A 270	Lesumer Schnellweg	Bremen-Blumenthal – Ritterhude	11	6.8	current	
A 280		(Groningen A7 –) AD Bunde	5	3.1	current	
A 281	Eckverbindung Bremen	AD Bremen-Industriehäfen – Burg-Grambke Bremen-Seehausen – Bremen Airport	11	6.8	current under construction: Burg-Grambke – Seehausen under construction and planned: Bremen Airport – Arsten	
A 282		Delmenhorst – Bremen			Planning abandoned; partially constructed as B 75	
A 290		Wilhelmshaven – Wittmund			Planning abandoned; partially constructed as B 210	
A 293	Westumgehung Oldenburg, Stadtautobahn Oldenburg	AK Oldenburg-Nord – AD Oldenburg-West	9	5.6	current	
Total Length			98	61		

== A 300 to A 399 ==
Highway shield	Expressway Name	Connects	Length (km)	Length (mi)	Status	Map
A 314		(Enschede N35–) Gronau – Münster			Cancelled in the 1990s; partially constructed as B 54	
A 339	Nordumgehung Bad Oeynhausen	Dehme – AK Bad Oeynhausen			Provisional number for A 30 east of Bad Oeynhausen if it had continued to Hannover; constructed as part of A 30 as it was never extended to Hannover	
A 352	Eckverbindung Hannover	AD Hannover-Nord – AD Hannover-West	17	11	current	
A 369	Zubringer Bad Harzburg, Harz-Highway	AD Nordhauz – AD Bad Harzburg	4	2.5	current Former portion of B 6	
A 376	Messestutzen, Messeschnellweg	Hannover-Messegelände – AD Hannover-Süd			Became the southern extension of A 37	
A 388	Nordumgehung Göttingen	AD Göttingen-Nord – Göttingen-Weende			Downgraded to B 27 in 2003	
A 391	Westtangente Braunschweig	Braunschweig-Wenden – AD Braunschweig-Südwest	12	7.5	current	
A 392	Nordtangente Braunschweig	Watenbüttel – Siegfriedviertel	4	2.5	current	
A 395	Harz-Highway	Braunschweig – Wolfenbüttel – Goslar			Planned as A 369 before 1974; AD Vienenburg – Bad Harzburg: Downgraded to B 6 (now A 369) and B 4 in 2001; Remainder renumbered to A 36 in 2019	
Total Length			37	23		

== A 400 to A 499 ==
Highway shield	Expressway Name	Connects	Length (km)	Length (mi)	Status	Map
A 430	Ruhrschnellweg	Duisburg – Mülheim an der Ruhr – Essen – Bochum – Dortmund			Became the eastern extension of A 40 in 1992	
A 432		Herne – Bochum			Never realized	
A 441		Lünen – Dortmund – Schwerte			Planning abandoned; constructed as B 236	
A 443	Querspange Unna	Unna – Unna-Süd			Downgraded to B 233 and L 679 in 2006 due to construction of a roundabout	
A 445		Werl-Nord – Arnsberg-Neheim	14	9	current planned: Hamm – Werl-Nord	
A 448	Bochumer Außenring, Opelquerspange	AD Bochum-West – AK Dortmund/Witten	18	11	current	
A 451		Remscheid – Gummersbach – Waldbröl			Planning abandoned; partially constructed as B 256	
A 480	Gießener Ring	Aßlar – AK Wetzlar Wettenberg – AK Gießen-Nord – AD Reiskirchen	19	12	current originally planned as part of A 48	
A 480		Wetzlar – Gießen			Downgraded to B 49	
A 485	Osttangente Gießen, Gießener Ring	AK Gießener-Nord – Langgöns	19	12	current	
Total Length			70	43		

== A 500 to A 599 ==
Highway shield	Expressway Name	Connects	Length (km)	Length (mi)	Status	Map
A 516	Zubringer Oberhausen	AK Oberhausen – Oberhausen-Eisenheim	5	3.1	current	
A 524		Duisburg-Huckingen – AD Breitscheid	8	5.0	current planned: Duisburg-Mündelheim – Duisburg-Huckingen	
A 533	Phantasialand-Autobahn	AK Bliesheim – Brühl			Redesignated as A 553	
A 535		Velbert – Wuppertal	13	8.1	current	
A 540	Zubringer Grevenbroich	Jüchen – Grevenbroich			Downgraded to B 59 in 2020	
A 542		Monheim – Langenfeld	6	3.7	current	
A 544	Aachener Zubringer	Aachen-Europaplatz – AK Aachen	5	3.1	current	
A 545		Aachen – Bad Münstereifel			Cancelled in 1980; never built	
A 552		Köln-Roggendorf/Thenhoven – Niehl			Planning abandoned; partially constructed as a Stadtstraße	
A 553	"Phantasialand-Autobahn" / -highway", Rheinsprange 553	AK Bliesheim – Brühl	13	8.1	current planned: Brühl – A 555 – AD Köln-Lind (A 59)	
A 555	Köln-Bonner Autobahn, Diplomatenrennbahn	Cologne – Bonn	20	12	current	
A 558		Frechen – Rodenkirchen			Never built	
A 559		AK Köln-Gremberg – AD Porz	7	4.3	current	
A 560	Siegtal-Autobahn	Sankt Augustin – Hennef	13	8.1	current	
A 562	Südumfahrung Bonn	Bonn-Friesdorf – AK Bonn-Ost	4	2.5	current	
A 565	Bonner Stadtautobahn	AD Bonn-Nordost – Meckenheim	27	17	current	
A 571	Abzweig Sinzig	Ehlingen – AD Sinzig	3	1.9	current	
A 573	Abzweig Bad Neuenahr–Ahrweiler	Grafschaft – Bad Neuenahr	3	1.9	current	
A 580	Aachener Zubringer	Aachen-Europaplatz – AK Aachen			Redesignated as A 544	
Total Length			127	79		

== A 600 to A 699 ==
Highway shield	Expressway Name	Connects	Length (km)	Length (mi)	Status	Map
A 602	Moseltalautobahn	Trier – AD Moseltal	10	6.2	current	
A 610		Idar-Oberstein – Bad Kreuznach			Planning abandoned; partially constructed as B 41	
A 620	Saarautobahn, Stadtautobahn Saarbrücken	Saarlouis – Saarbrücken	32	20	current	
A 621		Saarlouis – Überherrn			Planning abandoned; constructed as B 269	
A 623	Grühlingsstraße	Friedrichsthal – Saarbrücken	10	6.2	current	
A 643	Mainzer Ring (western part)	Wiesbaden – Mainz	8	5.0	current	
A 647	Taunusautobahn	Frankfurt-Höchst – Königstein im Taunus			Planning abandoned; partially constructed as B 8	
A 648	Wiesbadener Straße	AD Eschborn – Messe Frankfurt	5	3.1	current	
A 650		Bad Dürkheim – Ludwigshafen	14	8.7	current	
A 652		Kandel – Wörth am Rhein			Planning abandoned; partially constructed as A 65 and B 10	
A 653		Ludwigshafen – Speyer			Planning abandoned; constructed as B 44 and B 9	
A 654		Wörth am Rhein – Malsch			Never built	
A 655		Worms – Ludwigshafen – Schwetzingen			Planning abandoned; partially constructed as B 9, B 36, and B 535	
A 656		Mannheim – Heidelberg	12	7.5	current	
A 659		Weinheim – Viernheim	7	4.3	current	
A 661	Osttangente Frankfurt, Taunusschnellweg	Oberursel (Taunus) – Frankfurt – Offenbach am Main – Egelsbach	37	23	current	
A 671	Mainzer Ring (eastern part)	Wiesbaden – AD Mainspitz	12	7.5	current	
A 672	Querspange Darmstadt	Griesheim – Darmstadt	2	1.2	current	
A 680		Darmstadt – Dieburg			Downgraded to B 26 in the 1980s	
A 683	Rodgauautobahn	Dieburg – Hanau			Downgraded to B 45 in the 1980s	
A 687		Stockstadt am Main – Obernburg am Main			Planning abandoned; constructed as B 469	
Total Length			149	93		

== A 700 to A 799 ==
Highway shield	Expressway Name	Connects	Length (km)	Length (mi)	Status
A 713		Estenfeld – Würzburg-Heidingsfeld			Planning abandoned; constructed as B 19
A 722		AD Bayrisches Vogtland – AD Hochfranken			Ran across the East German border; now part of A 72
A 731		Bamberg – Pommersfelden			Planning abandoned; constructed as B 505
A 751	Frankenschnellweg (southern part)	Nürnberg – Schwabach			Initially merged into planning of the A 77 or B 2a and later abandoned; partially constructed as K N4
A 752	Südwesttangente (western part)	Nürnberg – Diespeck			Planning abandoned; constructed as B 8
A 753	Frankenschnellweg (northern part)	Erlangen – Nürnberg			Planning abandoned; constructed as A 73

== A 800 to A 899 ==
Highway shield	Expressway Name	Connects	Length (km)	Length (mi)	Status	Map
A 828		Baden-Baden – Geroldsau			Planning abandoned; partially constructed as B 500	
A 831		Stuttgart-Vaihingen – AK Stuttgart	2	1.2	current	
A 833		Sindelfingen – Böblingen			Downgraded to B 464 in 2002	
A 834		Stuttgart-Vaihingen – Stuttgart-Möhringen			Never built	
A 840		Kehl – Appenweier			Planning abandoned; constructed as B 28	
A 860	Stadtautobahn; Freiburg	Umkirch – Freiburg – Kirchzarten			Planned The section between B 31 and B 31a will be upgraded following the completion of the Freiburg City Tunnel	
A 861	Querspange Rheinfelden	Karsau – Rheinfelden (–A3 Zurich)	4	2.5	current	
A 862		(Mulhouse A 36 –) AD Neuenburg			Integrated as an entrance ramp to the A 5 in 2005	
A 863		Baden-Baden – Iffezheim (– Beinheim, Frankreich)			Planning abandoned; partially constructed as B 500	
A 863		Denzlingen – Freiburg im Breisgau			Planning abandoned; partially constructed as B 3 and B 294	
A 864		Donaueschingen – AD Bad Dürrheim	6	3.7	current originally planned as part of A 86	
A 881		Junction Hegau – Konstanz			Planning abandoned; partially built as B 33	
A 895		Ulm-Grimmelfingen – Ulm-Wiblingen			Planning abandoned; constructed as K 9915	
Total Length			12	7.5		

== A 900 to A 999 ==
Highway shield	Expressway Name	Connects	Length (km)	Length (mi)	Status	Map
A 921		Munich Airport – Munich			Planning abandoned	
A 922	Flughafenzubringer	Munich Airport – AD Munich-Feldmoching			Planning abandoned; constructed as A 92	
A 942		Mühldorf – Simbach			Planning abandoned; constructed as A 94	
A 944		Munich – Ebersberg – Wasserburg am Inn			Planning abandoned; partially constructed as B 304	
A 952	Abzweig Starnberg	AD Starnberg – Percha	5	3.1	current	
A 980	Abzweig Waltenhofen, Südumfahrung Kempten	AD Allgäu – Waltenhofen	5	3.1	current Formerly a portion of A 98	
A 985		Kempten – Oberstdorf			Planning abandoned; partially constructed as B 19	
A 990		Fröttmaning – Schwabing			Planning abandoned; constructed as A 9	
A 991		AD Munich-Feldmoching – Olympiapark			Planning abandoned; partially constructed as B 304	
A 992		Munich-Steinhausen – AK Munich-Ost			Planning abandoned; constructed as A 94	
A 993		Perlach – Putzbrunn			Planning abandoned; partially constructed as S 2078	
A 994		Munich-Ramersdorf – AK Munich-Süd			Planning abandoned; constructed as A 8	
A 995	Südzubringer Munich, Giesinger Autobahn	Munich-Giesing – Sauerlach – AK Munich-Süd	11	6.8	current	
A 996		Munich-Sendling – Forstenrieder Park			Planning abandoned; constructed as A 95	
A 997	Ammerseestraße	AD Munich-Südwest – Munich-Sendling			Planning abandoned; constructed as A 96	
A 998		AK Munich-West – Munich-Obermenzing			Planning abandoned; constructed as A 8	
A 999		Middle ring road around Munich			Planning abandoned; constructed as B 2 R	
Total Length			21	13		

== See also ==
- List of federal roads in Germany
- List of expressways
- Bundesverkehrswegeplan 2030
