= Bundesautobahn 542 =

Federal motorway in Germany

A 542
- Bundesautobahn 542

Route information
- Length: 5 km (3.1 mi)

Location
- Country: Germany
- States: North Rhine-Westphalia

Highway system
- Roads in Germany; Autobahns; List; Federal; List; State; E-roads

Bundesautobahn 542 (translates from German as Federal Motorway 542, short form Autobahn 542, abbreviated as BAB 542 or A 542) is a motorway in western Germany.

== Exit list ==
(1)	Monheim-Süd 4-way interchange A 59
(2)	Langenfeld-Reusrath B 8
(3)	Langenfeld-Immigrath
(4)	Langenfeld 4-way interchange A 3
