= Bundesautobahn 85 =

Federal motorway in Germany

A 85
- Bundesautobahn 85

Major junctions
- A 6 / E50

Location
- Country: Germany
- States: Baden-Württemberg

Highway system
- Roads in Germany; Autobahns; List; Federal; List; State; E-roads

Bundesautobahn 85 (translates from German as Federal Motorway 85, short form Autobahn 85, abbreviated as BAB 85 or A 85) was a planned Autobahn in Germany, supposed to connect Schwäbisch Hall with Ravensburg via Backnang, Stuttgart, Metzingen and Riedlingen. Its construction has been postponed.

== Exit list ==
Legend:

- I/C - Interchange, I/S - Intersection, RSA - Rest and service area, OBR - Overhead bridge restaurant, R/R - Restaurant and rest plaza, L/B - Layby, V/P - Vista point, TN - tunnel, T/P - Toll plaza, BR - Bridge
- C - Cloverleaf, S - Stack, T-A - Trumpet-A, T-B - Trumpet-B, DT - Directional-T/Y, SDT - Semi-Directional-T/Y, P-Y - Partial-Y, D - Diamond, P-C - Partial cloverleaf, D-D - Diverging diamond, D-R - Direct ramp

Intersection	(43)	Schwäbisch Hall 3-way interchange A 6 E50
		Übrigshausen / Untermünkheim B 19
		Sperbersbach-Brücke
		Wittighausen
		Talbrücke Gailenkircher Bach
		Grundbach-Brücke
		Wackershofen
Diversion		Sülz local diversion
Diversion		Gottwollshausen local diversion
		Heimbach B 19
----
		built as B 14
unterbrochen, weiterer Bedarf
		Tunnel 1500 m (planned)
		Bubenorbis (planned)
		Rötenbachtalbrücke 300 m (planned)
		Mainhardt-Ost (planned)
		Stammbachtalbrücke 100 m (planned)
		Mainhardt-West (planned) B 39
		Rottalbrücke 300 m (planned)
		Fuchsbachtalbrücke 200 m (planned)
		Tunnel 1000 m (planned)
		Haselbachalbrücke 300 m (planned)
		Grosserlach (planned)
		Tunnel 700 m (planned)
		Fischbachtalbrücke 1500 m (planned)
		Tunnel 1600 m (planned)
		Lautertalbrücke 800 m (planned)
		Tunnel 800 m (planned)
		Sulzbach (planned)
		Backnang-Nord (planned)
----
		built as B 14
		Murr
		Backnang-West (planned) L1115
		Backnang-Mitte
		parking area
		Murrtalviadukt 416 m
Diversion		Backnang-Maubach local diversion
		Tunnel Maubach 232 m (planned)
		Tunnel Waldrems 135 m (planned)
		Waldrems
		Leutenbach-Nellmersbach
		Tunnel Leutenbachtunnel 1080 m
		Winnenden-West
		Zipfelbachtalbrücke 465 m
		Schwaikheim
		Oeffingen (planned)
		Rest area Sörenberg/Korber Kopf
		Waiblingen-Nord
		Waiblingen-Mitte
		Remsbrücke 220 m
Intersection		Waiblingen 3-way interchange B 29
		Waiblingen-Süd/Fellbach
		Fellbach-Süd
		Tunnel Kappelbergtunnel 1565 m
		Stuttgart-Benzstraße
		Hochstraße 1400 m
		Neckar
Intersection		Neckarpark 3-way interchange B 10 B 14
L1198
		Rohracker (planned)
		Riedenberg (planned)
Intersection		3-way interchange Ostfildern (planned) A 834
