= Bundesautobahn 553 =

Federal motorway in Germany

A 553
- Bundesautobahn 553
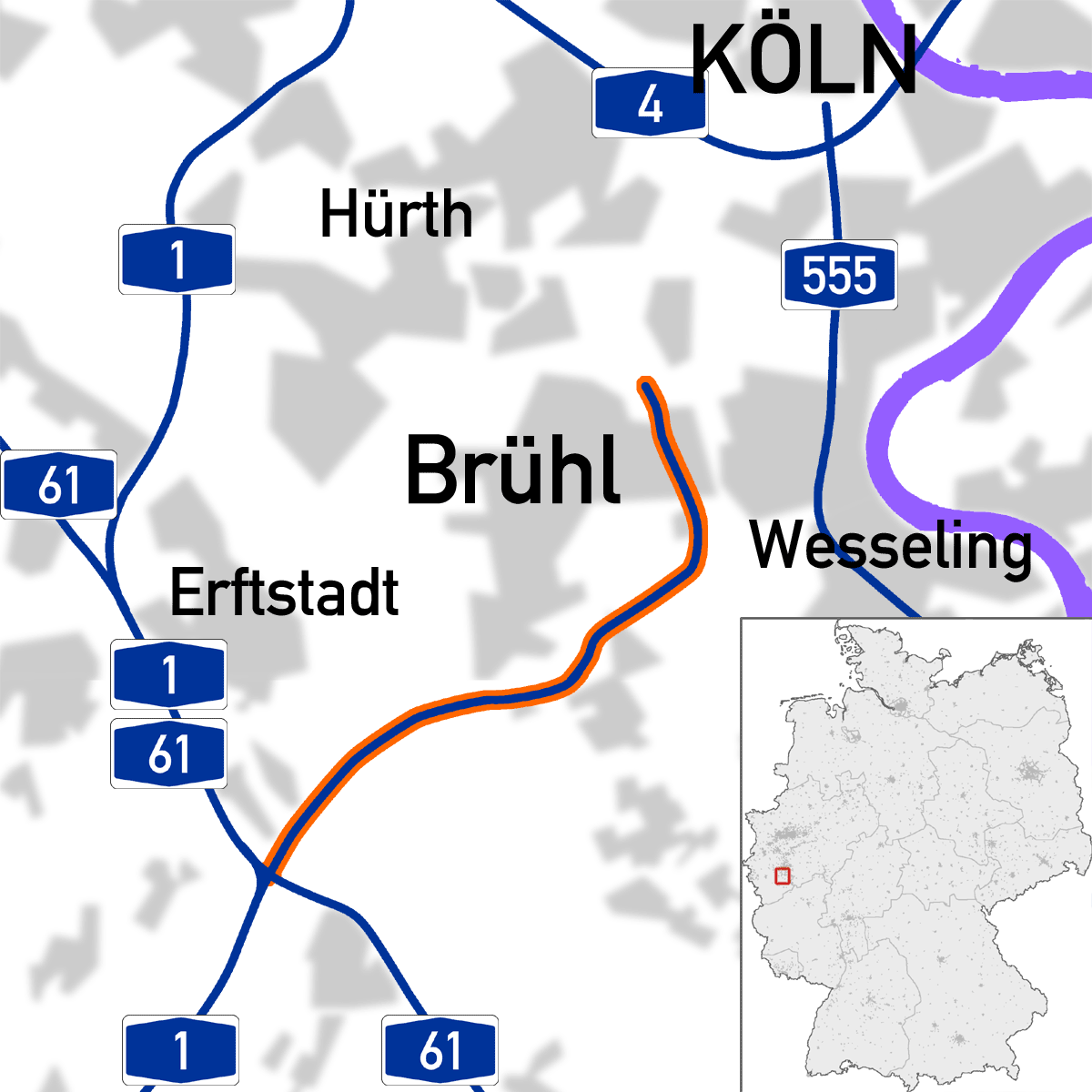

Route information
- Length: 13 km (8.1 mi)

Location
- Country: Germany
- States: North Rhine-Westphalia

Highway system
- Roads in Germany; Autobahns; List; Federal; List; State; E-roads

Bundesautobahn 553 (translates from German as Federal Motorway 553, short form Autobahn 553, abbreviated as BAB 553 or A 553) is a motorway in western Germany, connecting Brühl to the A 1, partially replacing the Bundesstraße 51.

== Exit list ==
Legend:

- I/C - Interchange, I/S - Intersection, RSA - Rest and service area, OBR - Overhead bridge restaurant, R/R - Restaurant and rest plaza, L/B - Layby, V/P - Vista point, TN - tunnel, T/P - Toll plaza, BR - Bridge
- C - Cloverleaf, S - Stack, T-A - Trumpet-A, T-B - Trumpet-B, DT - Directional-T/Y, SDT - Semi-Directional-T/Y, P-Y - Partial-Y, D - Diamond, P-C - Partial cloverleaf, D-D - Diverging diamond, D-R - Direct ramp

| (1) | Bliesheim 4-way interchange A 1, A 61 E31 |
| | Erftbrücke |
| (2) | Brühl-Süd |
| (3) | Brühl/Bornheim |
| (4) | Brühl-Ost |
| (5) | Brühl-Nord (Südteil) |
| B 51 | toward Köln |
