= Bundesautobahn 562 =

Federal motorway in Germany

A 562
- Bundesautobahn 562
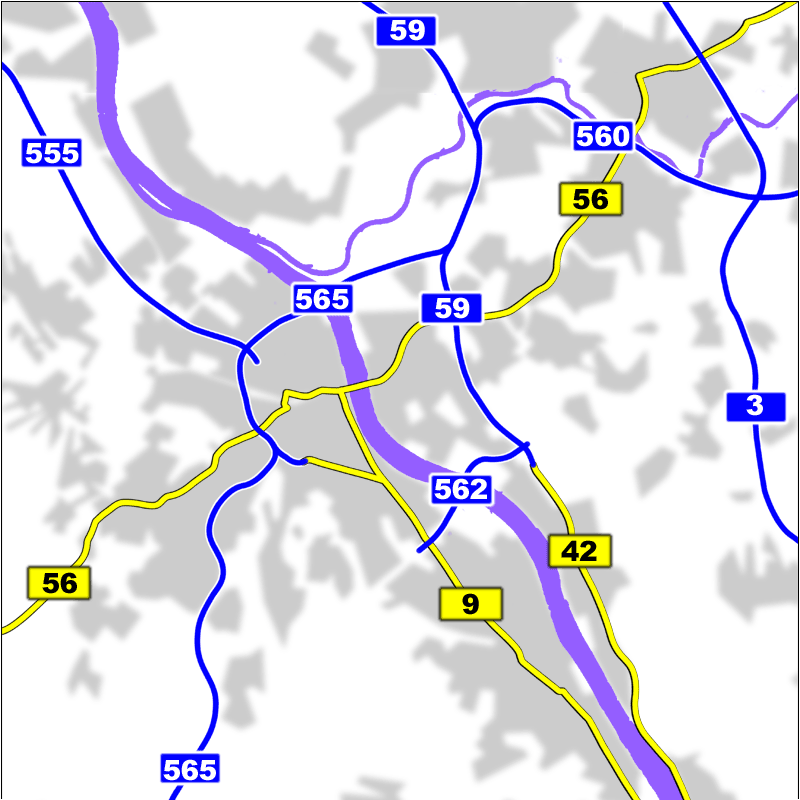

Route information
- Length: 3 km (1.9 mi)

Location
- Country: Germany
- States: North Rhine-Westphalia

Highway system
- Roads in Germany; Autobahns; List; Federal; List; State; E-roads

Bundesautobahn 562 (translates from German as Federal Motorway 562, short form Autobahn 562, abbreviated as BAB 562 or A 562) connects the right with the left side of the Rhine River south of Bonn. The motorway has two or three lanes. The autobahn crosses the Rhine using the Konrad Adenauer Bridge. Along both sides of this bridge are cycle tracks and footpaths. In the center strip there is an urban railway line.

== History ==
The route was once planned as a part of the A 56, which was to run from Waldbröl to the German/Dutch border in Selfkant.

== Exit list ==
(-)	Bonn-Friesdorf/Dottendorf
(1)	Bonn-Bad Godesberg B 9
(2)	Bonn-Rheinaue
	Konrad Adenauer Bridge 490 m (Rhine)
(3)	Bonn-Beuel-Süd
(4)	Bonn-Ost 4-way interchange A 59 B 42
(-)	Anschlussstelle
