= Bundesstraße 304 =

Federal highway in Germany

B 304
- Bundesstraße 304

Route information
- Length: 161 km (100 mi)

Major junctions
- From: Dachau
- To: Freilassing

Location
- Country: Germany
- States: Bavaria

Highway system
- Roads in Germany; Autobahns; List; Federal; List; State; E-roads

The Bundesstraße 304 is a German federal highway that runs from Dachau north of Munich through the Bavarian capital via Ebersberg, Wasserburg am Inn and Traunstein to Freilassing on the border with Austria, near Salzburg.

== History ==
Today's Bundesstraße 304 roughly follows the route of the old salt road, which led from Salzburg and Bad Reichenhall via Wasserburg am Inn, in the direction of Munich and on to Augsburg, and which was used to transport goods. Later, a stagecoach service connected Munich with Vienna.

In 1932, today's route of B 304 was part of the former Fernverkehrsstraße 10 (FVS 10). While the much longer part from Homburg to Augsburg was called Bundesstraße 10, the section from Munich to Freilassing was given its own number 304. In the second phase of imperial road numbering, Bad Ischl and Bad Aussee extended to Trautenfels (now Salzkammergutstraße B 145), where it ended at Ennstal Straße B 320 (then Reichsstraße 318).
