= Bundesstraße 10 =

Federal highway in Germany

B 10
- Bundesstraße 10

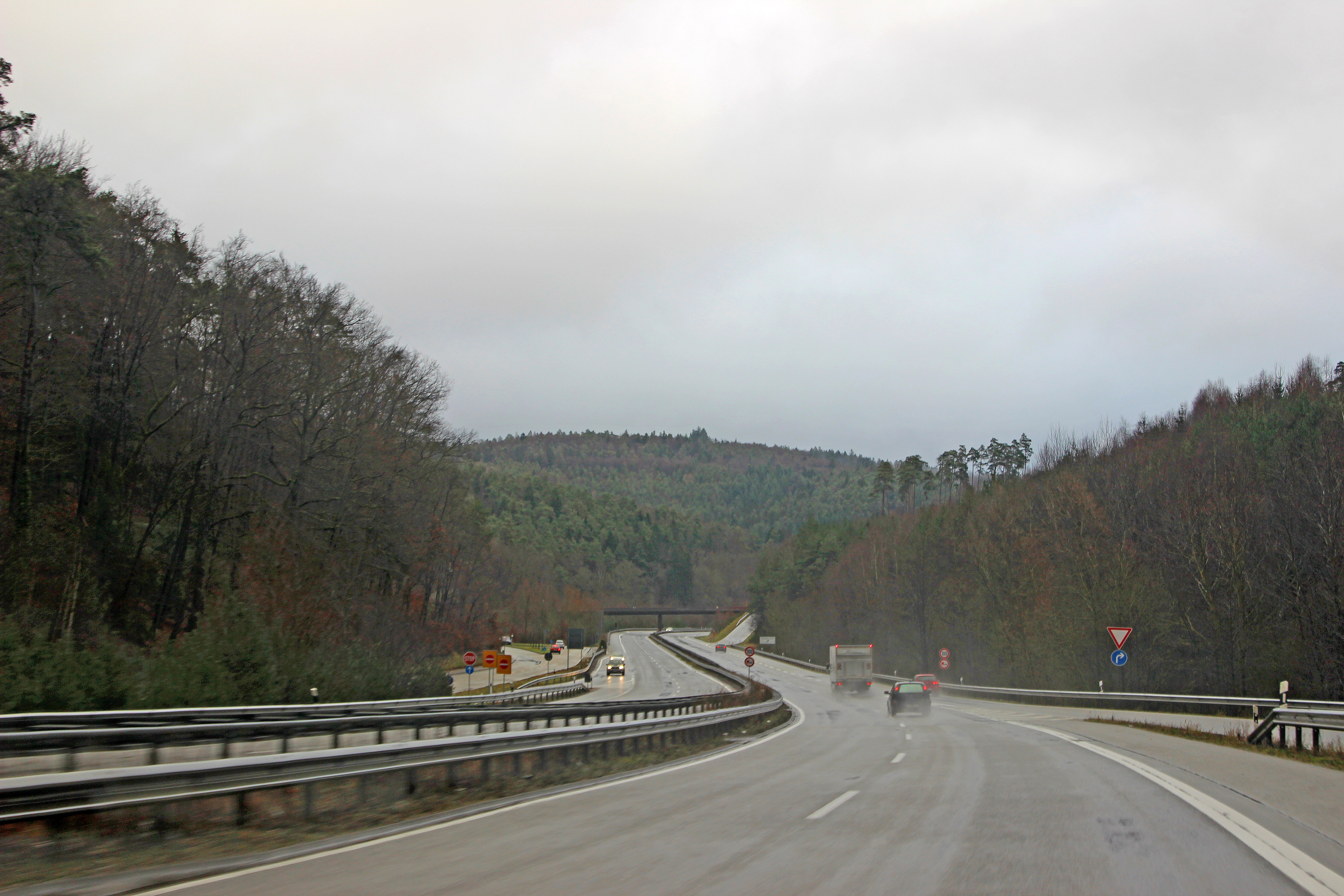

Route information
- Length: 300 km (190 mi)

Major junctions
- West end: Eppelborn
- B 269 / A 1 / E422 in Eppelborn; B 270 / A 62 / E50 in Pirmasens; B 427 in Lemberg; B 48 in Rinnthal; B 48 in Annweiler am Trifels; A 65 in Landau; A 5 / E35 B 3 in Karlsruhe; B 293 in Remchingen; A 8 / E52 B 294 B 463 in Pforzheim; B 35 in Mühlacker; A 81 / E41 B 27 B 295 B 14 in Stuttgart; B 313 in Plochingen; B 297 in Uhingen; B 297 in Göppingen; B 466 in Süßen; B 466 in Geißlingen; A 8 / E52 B 28 B 19 B 311 in Ulm; B 28 in Neu-Ulm; A 7 / E43 in Nersingen
- East end: Neusäß

Location
- Country: Germany
- States: Saarland, Rhineland-Palatinate, Baden-Württemberg, Bavaria

Highway system
- Roads in Germany; Autobahns; List; Federal; List; State; E-roads

The Bundesstraße 10 (abbr. B10) is a German federal highway. It leads from Eppelborn, near the city of Lebach in Saarland, eastward to Neusäß near Augsburg in Bavaria. The Bundesautobahn 8 mostly runs in parallel to the Bundesstraße 10.

After a very short strip near Eppelborn leading to the Bundesautobahn 1, the road continues at Pirmasens. Because the construction of the A 8 through the Pfälzerwald never commenced, the Bundesstraße 10 has to carry the east-west traffic, though plans to upgrade the road to four lanes are underway. At Landau, the Bundesautobahn 65 replaces the Bundesstraße 10 up to the city of Wörth am Rhein, from where it continues to Karlsruhe, crossing the river Rhine, through Pforzheim, the city of Stuttgart, Göppingen, Ulm up to Neusäß, shortly before the city of Augsburg. Especially the part in Baden-Württemberg suffers from heavy traffic and high congestion, and there are attempts to improve the traffic situation by upgrading the road.

Originally, the Bundesstraße 10 continued from Augsburg to Munich and then past Traunstein to Freilassing near the Austrian border at Salzburg and, after the Anschluss, past Bad Ischl to Styria. This eastern part was relabeled the Bundesstraße 304 in 1940.

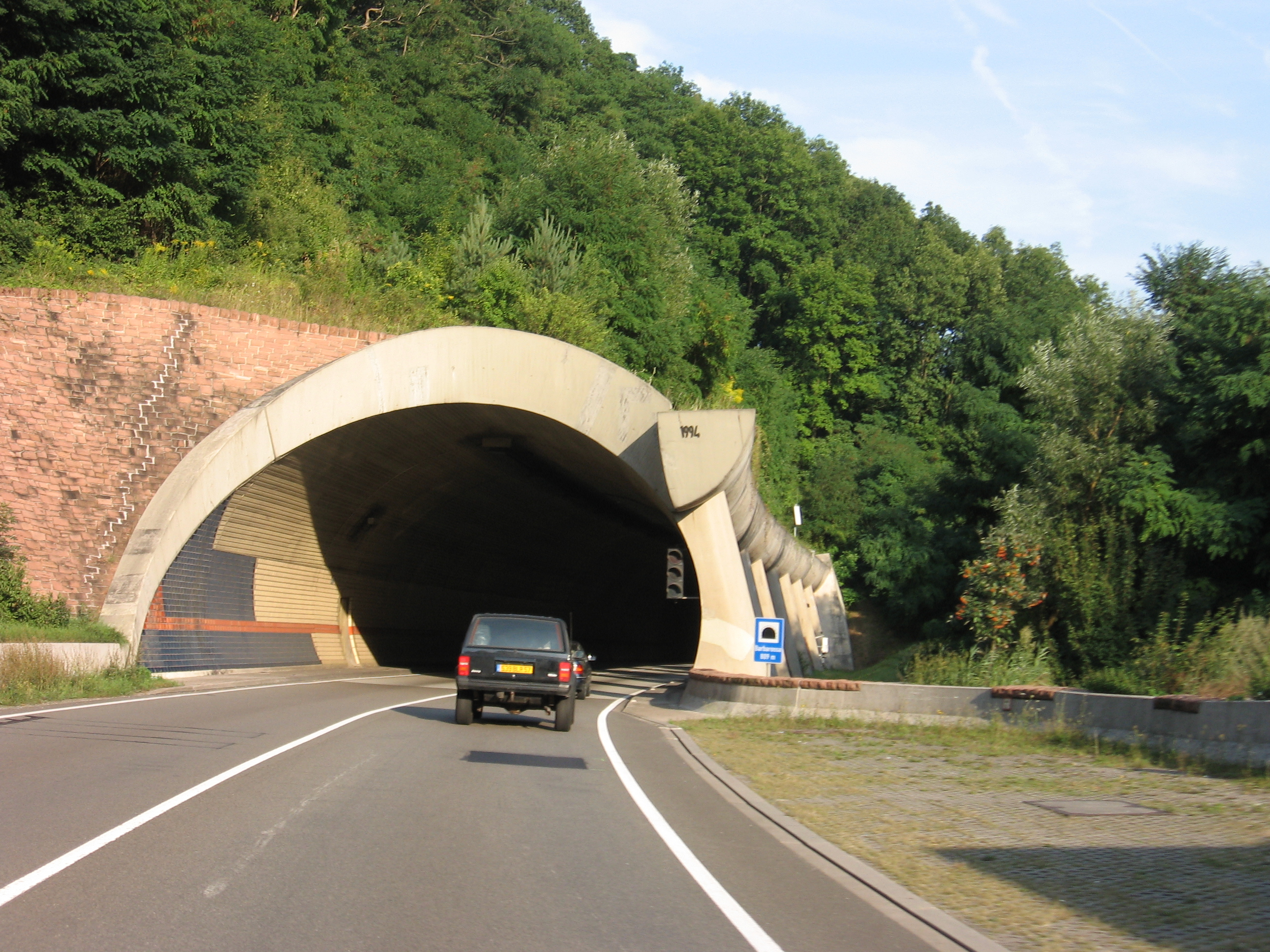
Tunnel in the Palatinate Forest

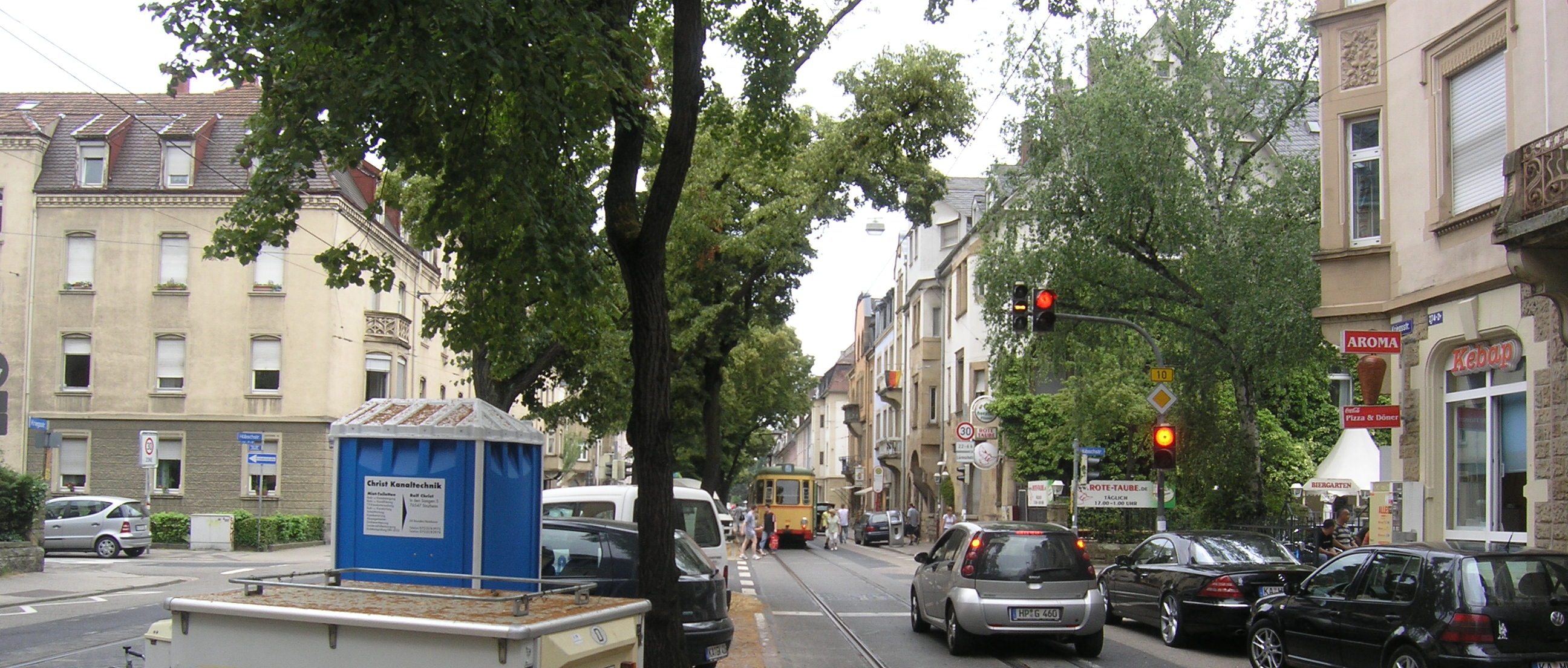
Narrow crossing of Karlsruhe

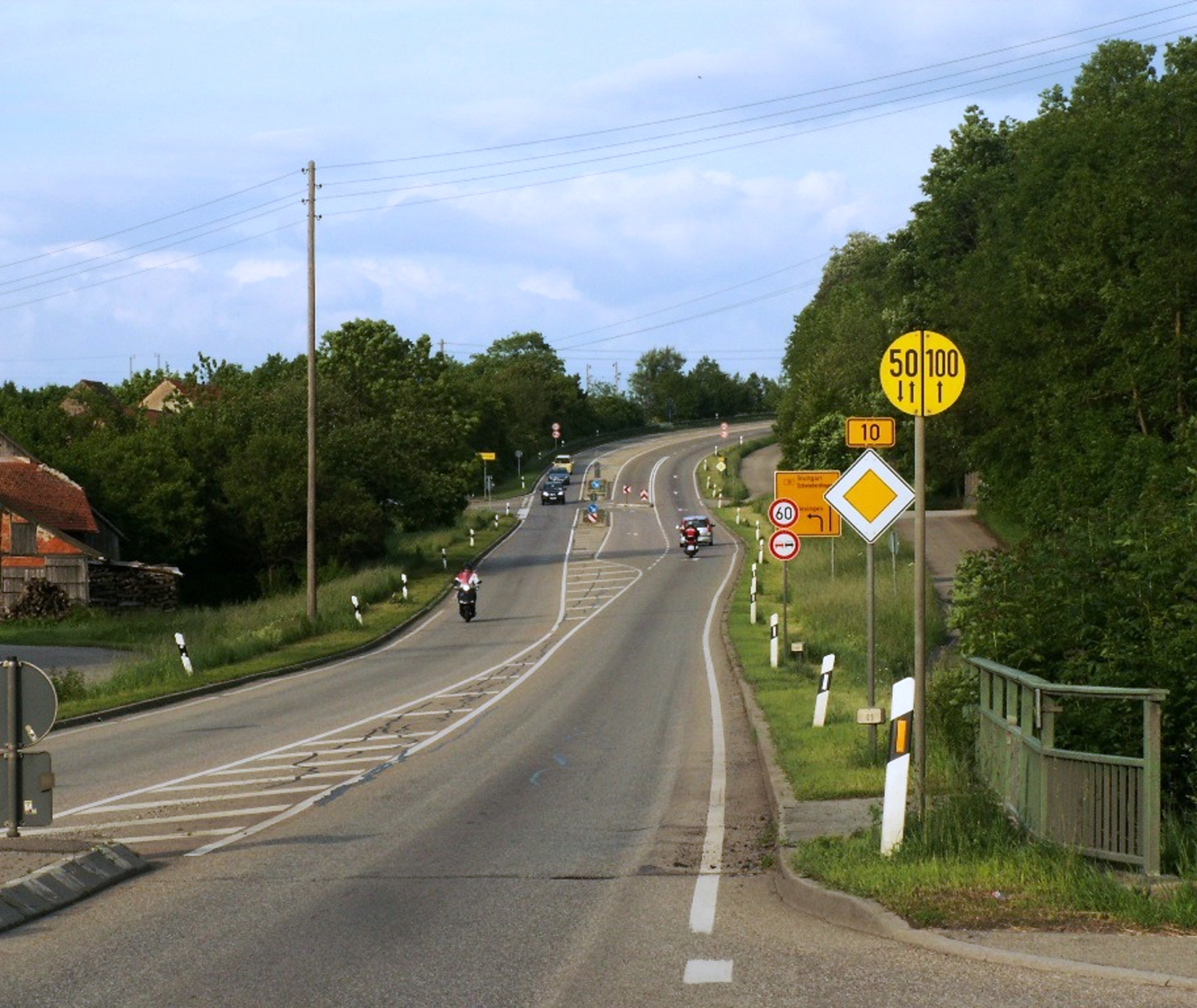
Steep ascent in the Gäu

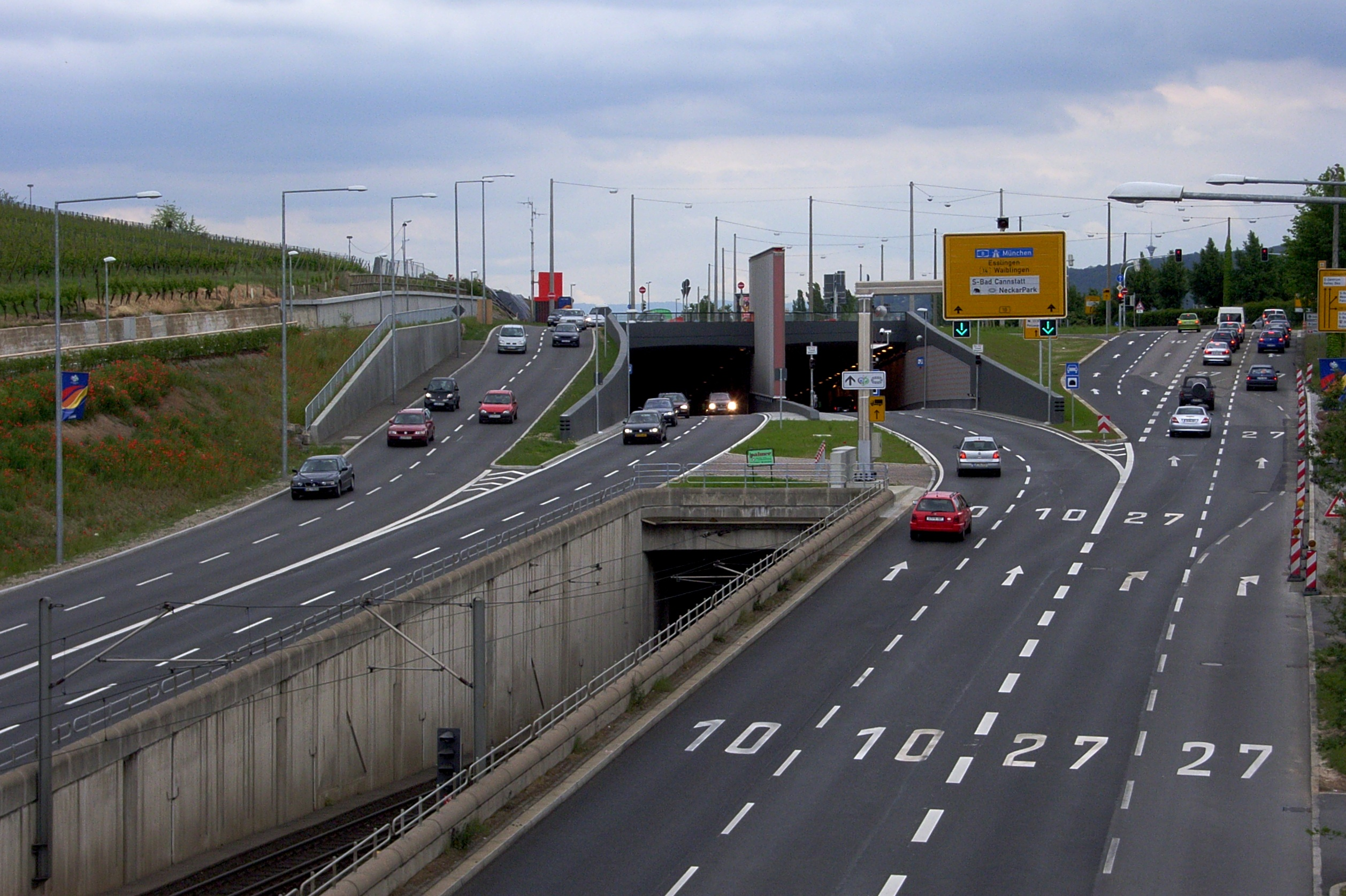
arriving in Stuttgart

== Junction lists ==
Legend:

- I/C - Interchange, I/S - Intersection, RSA - Rest and service area, OBR - Overhead bridge restaurant, R/R - Restaurant and rest plaza, L/B - Layby, V/P - Vista point, TN - tunnel, T/P - Toll plaza, BR - Bridge
- C - Cloverleaf, S - Stack, T-A - Trumpet-A, T-B - Trumpet-B, DT - Directional-T/Y, SDT - Semi-Directional-T/Y, P-Y - Partial-Y, D - Diamond, P-C - Partial cloverleaf, D-D - Diverging diamond, D-R - Direct ramp

Eppelborn B 269
Eppelborn A 1 E422
Pirmasens B 270 A 62 E50
Lemberg B 427
Rinntahl B 48
Annweiler am Trifels B 48
Landau A 65
Karlsruhe A 5 E35 B 3
Remchingen B 293
Pforzheim A 8 E52 B 294 B 463
Mühlacker B 35
Stuttgart A 81 E41 B 27 B 295 B 14
Plochingen B 313
Uhingen B 297
Göppingen B 297
Süßen B 466
Geißlingen B 466
Ulm A 8 E52 B 28 B 19 B 311
Neu-Ulm B 28
Nersingen A 7 E43
