= Bundesautobahn 620 =

Federal motorway in Germany

A 620
- Bundesautobahn 620
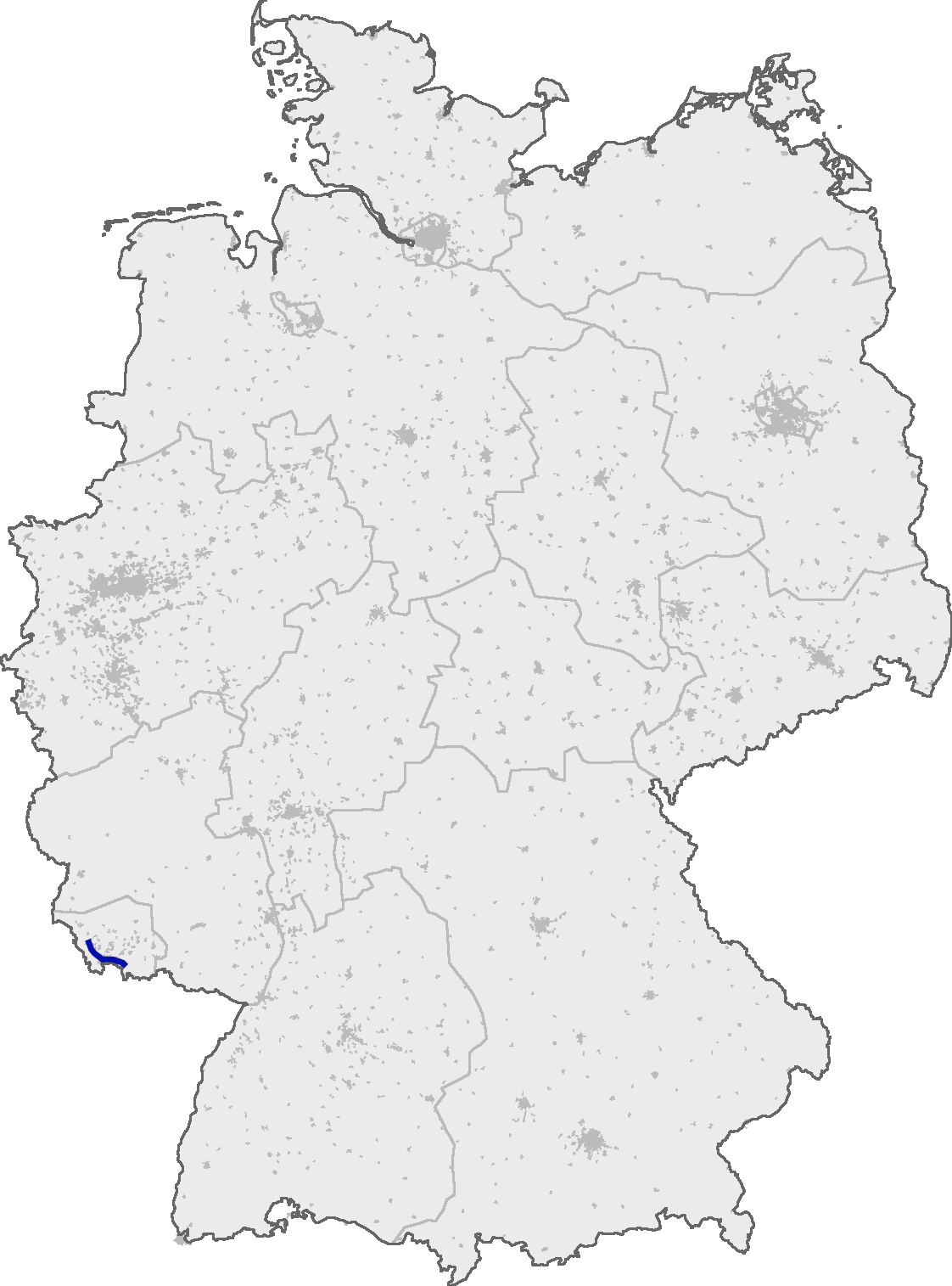

Route information
- Length: 31 km (19 mi)

Major junctions
- From: Saarlouis
- A 8
- To: Saarbrücken

Location
- Country: Germany
- States: Saarland

Highway system
- Roads in Germany; Autobahns; List; Federal; List; State; E-roads

Bundesautobahn 620 (translates from German as Federal Motorway 620, short form Autobahn 620, abbreviated as BAB 620 or A 620) is an autobahn in Germany, connecting Saarlouis with Saarbrücken. Together with the BAB8, it serves as part of the connection between Luxembourg and Germany. As the major part of the BAB 620 is alongside the river Saar, one section in Saarbrücken, the so-called "Stadtautobahn" is subject to flooding several times a year. Because of that, locals jokingly call it "Bundesschifffahrtsstrasse" (Federal water lane) and "Nebenfluss der Saar mit 13 Buchstaben" (tributary of the Saar with 13 letters). A tunnel is being discussed to circumvent the flooding problem.

== Exit list ==
km	Exit	Name
	(1)	Saarlouis 3-way interchange A 8
	(2)	Wallerfangen
	(3)	Saarlouis-Mitte B 269, B 405
		Tankstelle
	(4a)	Saarlouis-Lisdorf
	(4b)	Ensdorf
	(5)	Wadgassen
		Bistbrücke 75 m
	(7)	Völklingen-Wehrden
		Rosseltalbrücke 500 m
	(8)	Völklingen-Geislautern
		Hallerbrücke 700 m
	(9)	Völklingen-Mitte
	(10)	Völklingen-Ost
		Services Völklingen
		Temporary exit when flooded
	(11)	Saarbrücken-Klarenthal
	(12)	Saarbrücken-Gersweiler
	(13)	Saarbrücken-Messegelände
		Filling station (planned)
	(14)	Saarbrücken-Malstatter Brücke
	(15)	Saarbrücken-Westspangenbrücke
	(16)	Saarbrücken-Luisenbrücke
	(17)	Saarbrücken-Wilhelm-Heinrich-Brücke B 41
	(18)	Saarbrücken-Bismarckbrücke
		Temporary exit when flooded
	(19)	Saarbrücken-St. Arnual
	(20)	Saarbrücken-Unner B 406
		Saarbrücke 250 m
	(21)	Saarbrücken-Güdingen B 51
	(22)	Saarbrücken 3-way interchange A 6
