= Bundesautobahn 59 =

Federal motorway in Germany

A 59
- Bundesautobahn 59
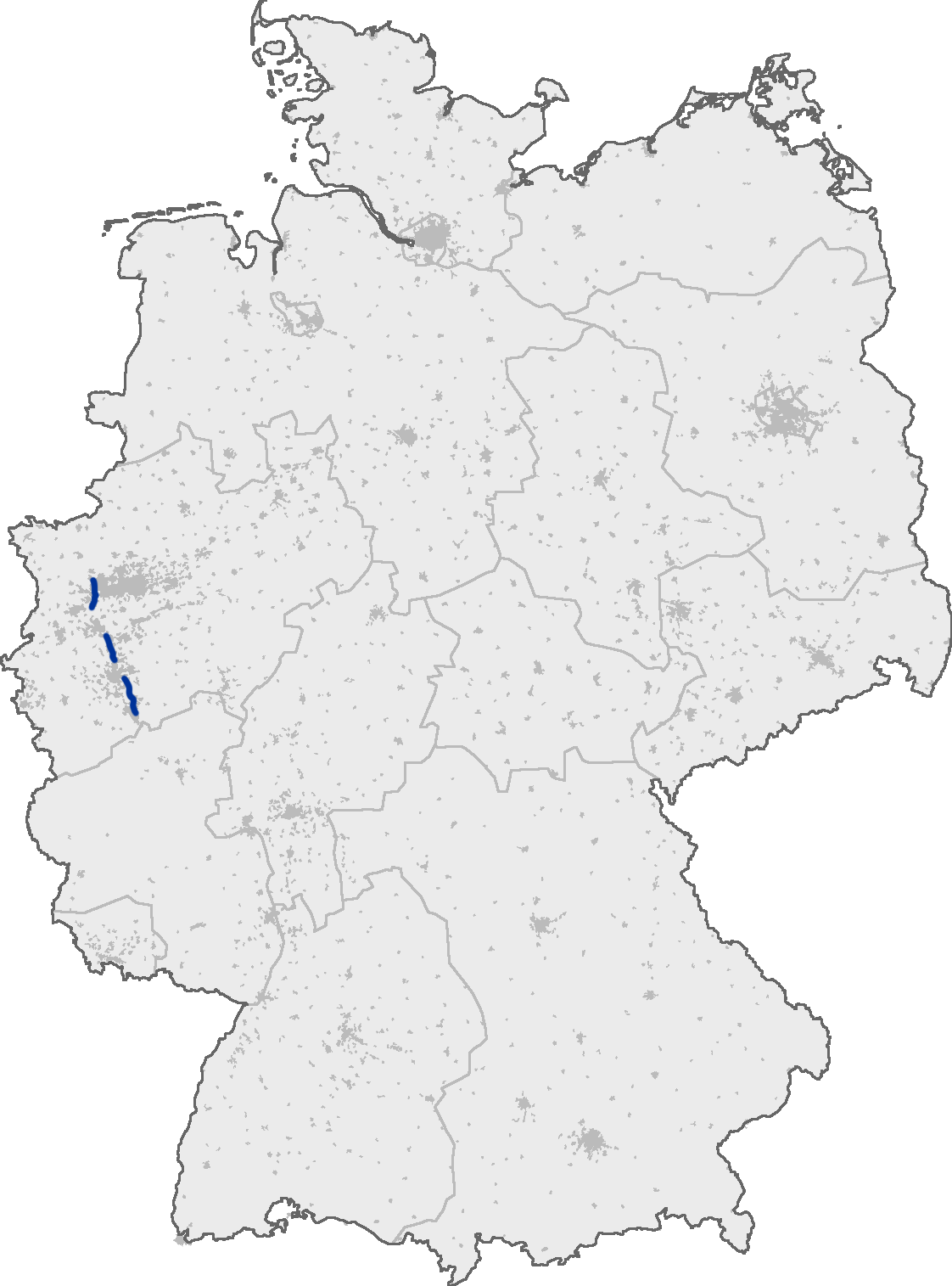

Route information
- Length: 74 km (46 mi)

Location
- Country: Germany
- States: North Rhine-Westphalia

Highway system
- Roads in Germany; Autobahns; List; Federal; List; State; E-roads
← A 57	→ A 60

Bundesautobahn 59 (translates from German as Federal Motorway 59, short form Autobahn 59, abbreviated as BAB 59 or A 59) is an autobahn in Germany that starts in Dinslaken and runs with three breaks along Duisburg, Düsseldorf and Cologne to Bonn.

In Duisburg it is also the city highway.

Between Cologne and Bonn the A 59 has the nickname "Flughafenautobahn" (Airport motorway), because it runs along the Cologne Bonn Airport.

== Exit list ==
	(1)	Dinslaken-West B 8
	(2)	Dinslaken-Hiesfeld B 8
	(3)	Duisburg-Walsum
	(4)	Duisburg-Fahrn
		Hochstraße 320 m
	(5)	Duisburg-Marxloh
		Hochstraße 560 m
	(5a)	Duisburg-Marxloh
	(6)	Duisburg-Althamborn
	(6a)	Duisburg-Nord 4-way interchange A 42
		Hochstraße 320 m
	(7)	Duisburg-Meiderich
		Hochstraße 430 m
	(8)	Duisburg-Ruhrort
		Berliner Brücke 1824 m
	(9)	Duisburg 4-way interchange A 40 E34
		Hafenbahnbrücke 303 m
	(10)	Duisburg-Duissern
		Tunnel Mercatortunnel 295 m
	(11)	Duisburg-Zentrum
	(12)	Duisburg-Hochfeld
		Grunewaldbrücke 900 m
	(13)	Duisburg-Wanheimerort
	(14)	Duisburg-Buchholz
	(15)	Duisburg-Großenbaum
	(16)	Kreuz Duisburg-Süd 4-way interchange A 524 B 8 B 288
		Düsseldorf-Wittlaer (planned) B 8
		Kreuz Düsseldorf-Nord (planned) A 44
A 44
	(-)	Düsseldorf-Nord 4-way interchange A 52
		Tunnel Schwarzbach 150 m / 158 m
	(-)	Düsseldorf-Nord 4-way interchange A 52
A 44
Intersection		3-way interchange Rath (planned) A 44
		Düsseldorf-Mörsenbroich (planned)
		Tunnel 2500 m (planned)
		Düsseldorf-Grafenberg (planned)
		Düsseldorf-Flingern (planned)
		Düsseldorf-Lierenfeld (planned)
		Düsseldorf-Vennhausen (planned)
	(21)	Düsseldorf-Süd 3-way interchange A 46
	(22)	Düsseldorf-Benrath
	(23)	Düsseldorf-Garath B 8
		Hochstraße 100 m
		Rest area Wolfhagen
	(24)	Richrath
		Rest area Berghausen
	(25)	Monheim
	(26)	Monheim-Süd 4-way interchange A 542
	(27)	Rheindorf
		Wupperbrücke 140 m
	(28)	Leverkusen-West A 1 E37
	(-)	provisorischer Anschluss
		Kölner Ring
Intersection	(31)	Heumarer Dreieck A 3 E35 A 4 E40
		Hochstraße 480 m
	(32)	Rath
	(33)	Porz 3-way interchange A 559
		Tankstelle Schloss Röttgen
	(34)	Flughafen ((Airport)
	(35)	Wahn
	(36)	Lind B 8
		Bahnbrücke 60 m
	(37)	Spich
	(38)	Troisdorf
		Siegbrücke 310 m
	(39)	Sankt Augustin-West 3-way interchange A 560
	(40)	Bonn-Nordost 3-way interchange A 565
	(41)	Bonn-Vilich B 56
	(42)	Bonn-Pützchen
	(43)	Bonn-Ost 4-way interchange A 562 B 42
