= Bundesautobahn 860 =

Federal motorway in Germany

A 860
- Bundesautobahn 860

Route information
- Length: 15 km (9.3 mi)

Location
- Country: Germany
- States: Baden-Württemberg

Highway system
- Roads in Germany; Autobahns; List; Federal; List; State; E-roads

The Bundesautobahn 860, also known as the Stadtautobahn Freiburg, is a planned Autobahn in Germany. It is a planned upgrade of the Bundesstraße 31 in Freiburg, which involves the construction of a new tunnel in the city, the Freiburger Stadttunnel. The highway will begin in Umkirch and will mostly travel along the existing B 31, which is built to freeway standards within the Freiburg area, to Buchenbach, at which point the B 31 will continue towards Donaueschingen.

== Description ==
The 'Bundesautobahn 860' (abbreviation: 'BAB 860' ) - Short form: 'Autobahn 860' (abbreviation : 'A 860' ) - also referred to as the 'Stadtautobahn Freiburg' , after the completion of the Freiburg City Tunnel a section of the Bundesstraße 31 will be upgraded to a motorway. ]. The autobahn is to begin in Umkirch and lead over the B 31, which is already largely autobahn-like, to Buchenbach, where it is to change back to the B 31. The project is identified as an urgent need in the Bundesverkehrswegeplan 2030.

== Planning ==
In order to enable a full connection between the existing Schützenalleetunnel and the future city tunnel in the Wiehre district at the level of the Ganter Brewery, the City of Freiburg would have the entire road classified as a Bundesstraße Costs for the city tunnel in the amount of at least 300 million euros. For financial reasons, it was therefore decided to upgrade the B 31 to the Federal Motorway 860, since the Federal bears the costs for motorways. The sections of the B 31 and B 31a, which have already been developed in a manner similar to a motorway, are to be upgraded to a motorway at the same time as the completion of the city tunnel, in the best case around 2030. Another project in the BVWP 2030 in this context is the four-lane Expansion between the Kirchzarten and Buchenbach junctions. The bridges over today's B 31 are already designed accordingly wide.
