= Bundesautobahn 544 =

Federal motorway in Germany

Coordinates: 50°46′49″N 6°06′30″E

A 544
- Bundesautobahn 544

Route information
- Length: 5.4 km (3.4 mi)

Location
- Country: Germany
- States: North Rhine-Westphalia

Highway system
- Roads in Germany; Autobahns; List; Federal; List; State; E-roads

Bundesautobahn 544 (translates from German as Federal Motorway 544, short form Autobahn 544, abbreviated as BAB 544 or A 544) is a motorway in the city of Aachen in western Germany.

== Exit list ==
(1)	Aachen-Europaplatz B 1 B 264
(2)	Aachen-Rothe Erde
	Haarbachtalbrücke 157 m
(3)	Würselen
(4)	Aachen 4-way interchange A 4 E314 A 44 E40

== Gallery ==
Bundesautobahn 544

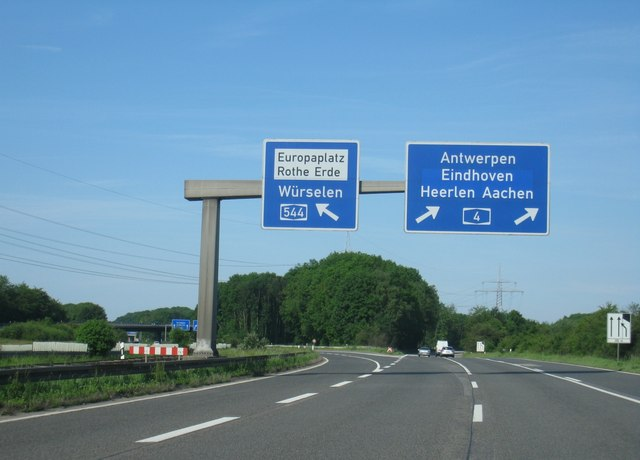
Start of A 544 at Autobahn interchange Aachen (2010)

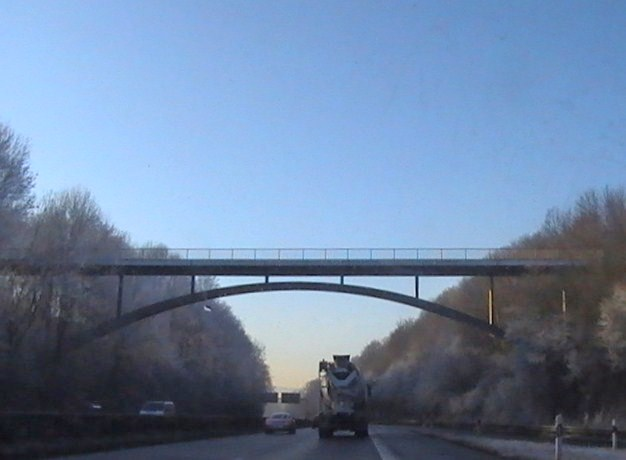
Bridge over the Autobahn near Würselen

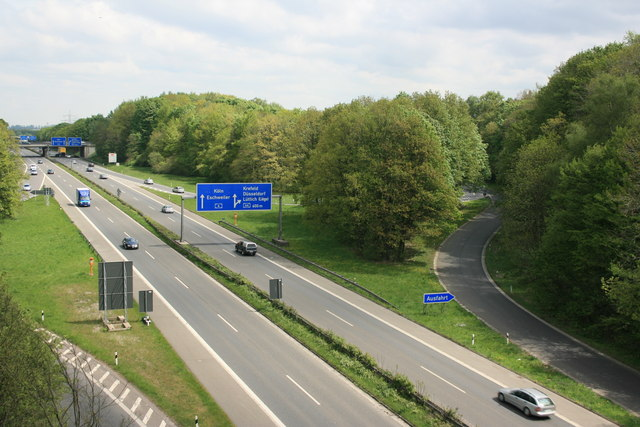
Autobahn-Exit "Würselen"

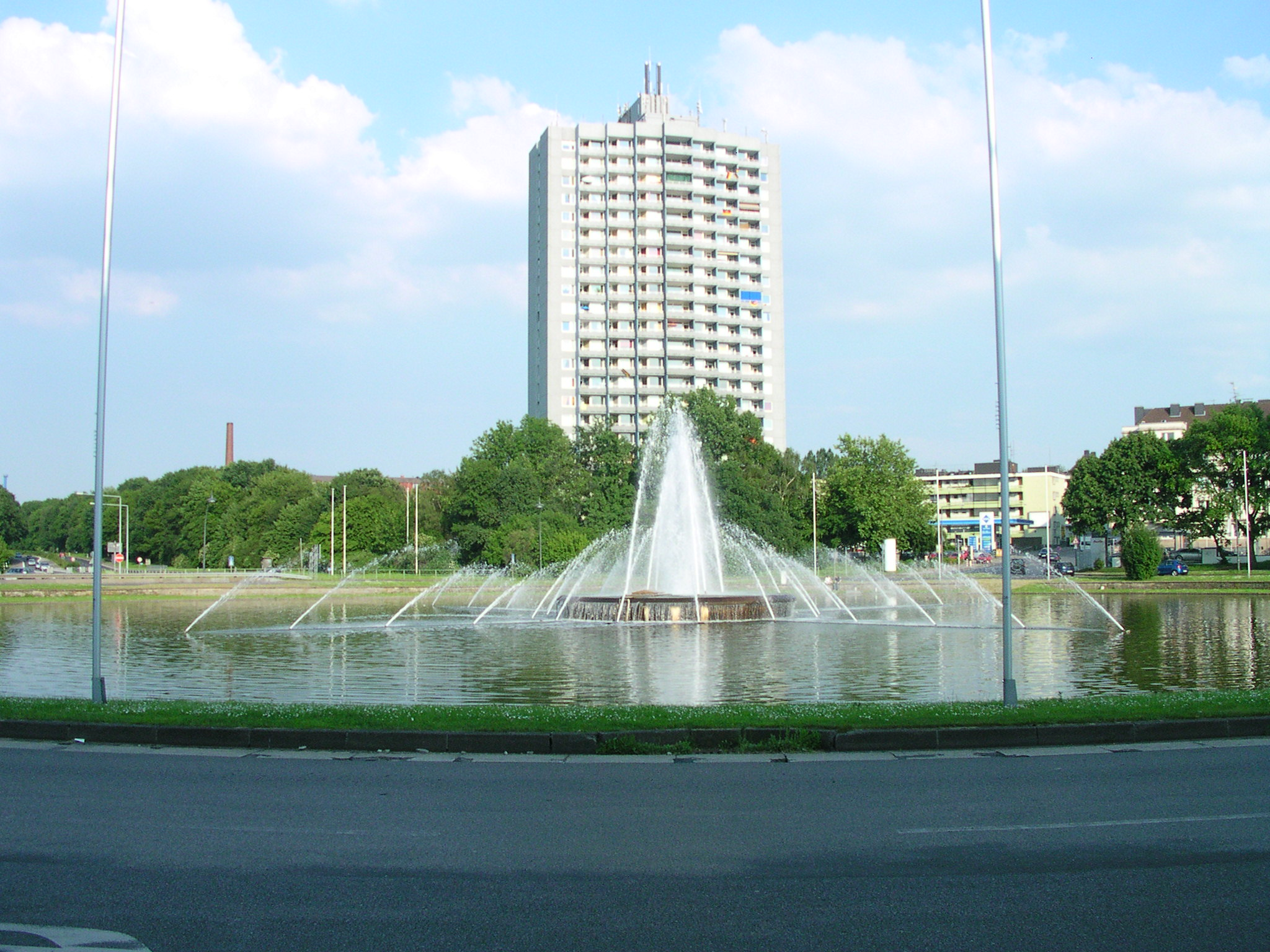
Europaplatz, where Autobahn 544 ends

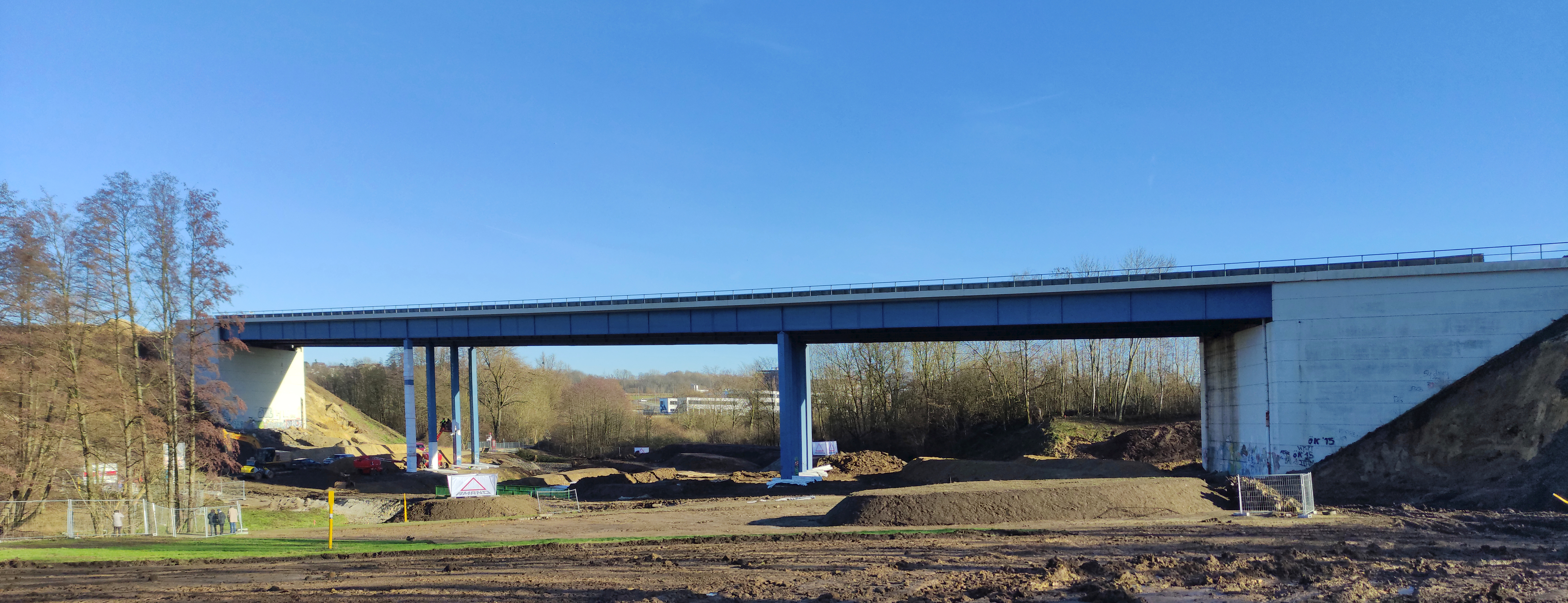
The old bridge over Haarbach valley (1956–2024)

Blasting of the Haarbach valley bridge
