= Bundesautobahn 862 =

Former federal motorway in Germany, now part of Bundesautobahn 5

Coordinates: 47°46′33″N 7°31′55″E

A 862
- Bundesautobahn 862

Route information
- Length: 0.4 km (0.25 mi; 1,300 ft)
- History: Became an on-ramp into the A 5 in 2005

Location
- Country: Germany
- States: Baden-Württemberg

Highway system
- Roads in Germany; Autobahns; List; Federal; List; State; E-roads

Bundesautobahn 862 (translates from German as Federal Motorway 862, short form Autobahn 862, abbreviated as BAB 862 or A 862) was an autobahn in Germany. Its purpose was to connect the French Autoroute 36 with the German Bundesautobahn 5 via a bridge over the Rhine. At 400 metres, the A 862 was Germany's shortest autobahn; it was later integrated as an onramp into the A 5.

== Junction lists ==
Legend:

- I/C - Interchange, I/S - Intersection, RSA - Rest and service area, OBR - Overhead bridge restaurant, R/R - Restaurant and rest plaza, L/B - Layby, V/P - Vista point, TN - tunnel, T/P - Toll plaza, BR - Bridge

km	Exit	Name	Destinations
		France–Germany border Through to A 36	
	1	Neuenburg border crossing	
	2	Neuenburg	A 5 / E35; E54
