= Bundesstraße 99 =

Federal highway in Germany

B 99
- Bundesstraße 99

Route information
- Length: 36 km (22 mi)

Major junctions
- North end: Görlitz
- South end: Zittau

Location
- Country: Germany
- States: Saxony

Highway system
- Roads in Germany; Autobahns; List; Federal; List; State; E-roads

The Bundesstraße 99 is a German federal highway. It originally ran from Neusalz via Rothenburg, Oberlausitz and Görlitz to Zittau where it ended at the Bundesstraße 96. After World War II, as the bridge over the Neiße was destroyed by retreating German forces, the East German government degraded the strip from the Polish border to Görlitz, making that city the new northern terminus.
