= Langenfeld, Rhineland =

Langenfeld
- Town
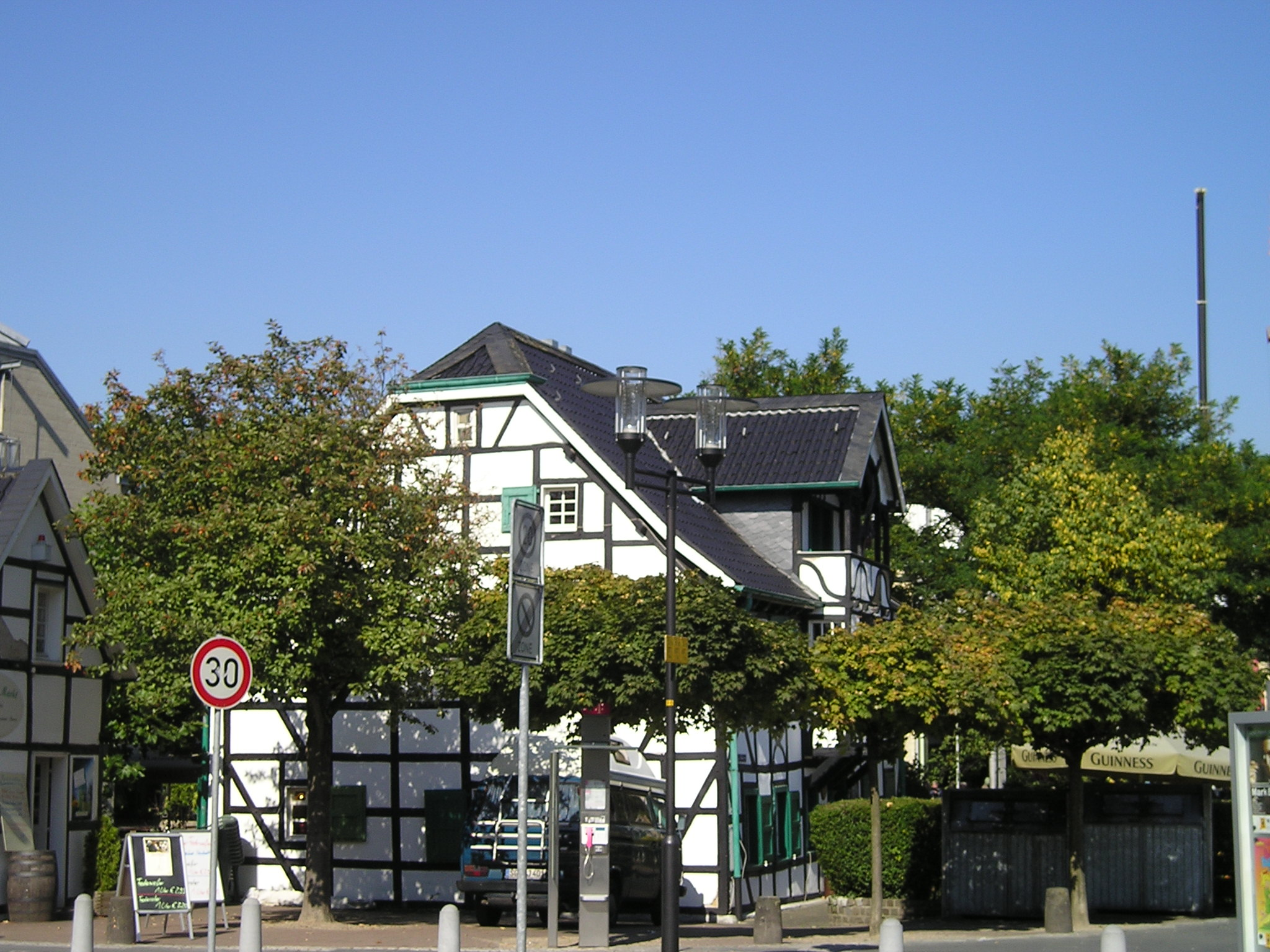
- Haus Arndt

- Coat of arms

- Location of Langenfeld within Mettmann district
- Interactive map of Langenfeld
- Location within Germany Location within North Rhine-Westphalia
- Coordinates: 51°7′N 6°57′E
- Country: Germany
- State: North Rhine-Westphalia
- Admin. region: Düsseldorf
- District: Mettmann
- Subdivisions: 5

Government
  - Mayor (2025–30): Gerold Wenzens (B/G/L)

Area
  - Total: 41.15 km^{2} (15.89 sq mi)
- Elevation: 37–111 m (121–364 ft)

Population (2025-12-31)
  - Total: 59,821
  - Density: 1,454/km^{2} (3,765/sq mi)
- Time zone: UTC+01:00 (CET)
  - Summer (DST): UTC+02:00 (CEST)
- Postal codes: 40764
- Dialling codes: 02173, (02171), (0212)
- Vehicle registration: ME
- Website: www.langenfeld.de

Langenfeld (German pronunciation: [ˈlaŋənfɛlt]; Ripuarian: Langefääl) is a town in North Rhine-Westphalia (Germany) in the district of Mettmann. The suburban city is located between Düsseldorf and Cologne. Langenfeld was formed from the two localities of Richrath and Reusrath and received city rights in 1948.

== Population ==
Historical population

Year	Pop.	±% p.a.
1965	38,732	—
1970	44,356	+2.75%
1975	47,317	+1.30%
1980	47,032	−0.12%
1985	48,359	+0.56%
1990	53,455	+2.02%
1995	56,676	+1.18%

Year	Pop.	±% p.a.
2000	58,429	+0.61%
2005	58,993	+0.19%
2010	59,160	+0.06%
2015	58,033	−0.38%
2020	59,112	+0.37%
2025	59,821	+0.24%

Source: Landesdatabank Nordrhein-Westfalen

== Economics ==
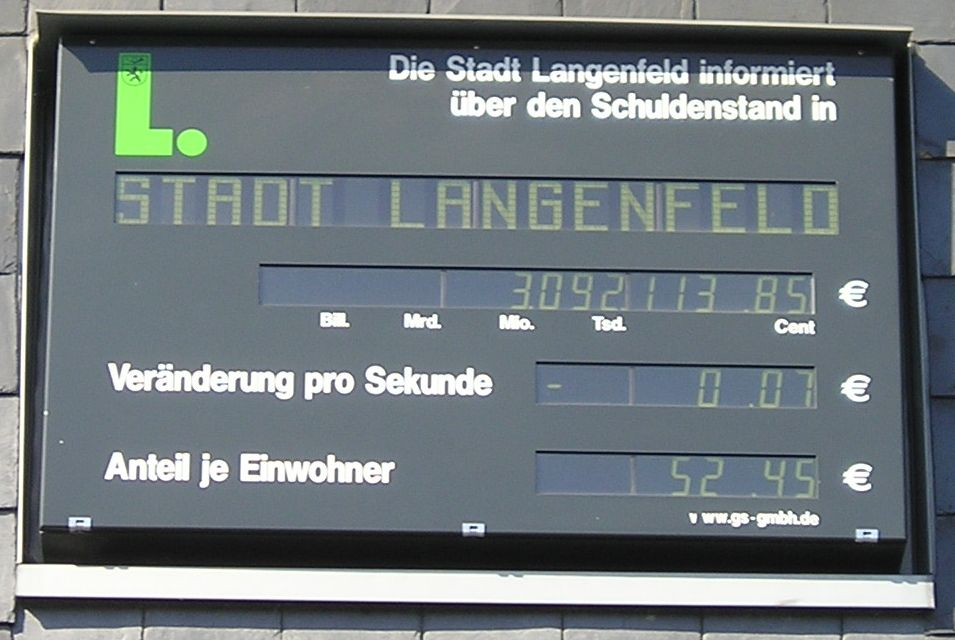
Debt clock (2007)

Langenfeld has no public debt as of 3 October 2008. The debt clock installed at the town hall in 1997, showing the current debts of Langenfeld, the Rhineland, and the national debt, got demounted end of 2008 and handed over to Grevenbroich. In Langenfeld it had served its purpose, so the comment by former mayor Magnus Staehler. The town was honored for that with the prize Kommune des Jahres 2007 (Municipality of the Year 2007) in the national contest Großer Preis des Mittelstandes (Grand Prize by Small Firms and Traders) of the Oskar-Patzelt-Siftung. To achieve that goal, on the one hand taxes got raised and in addition cuts of subsidies to clubs applied, so that debts halved from 1997 up to 2002. Being free of debt, and with that regaining free hand, was celebrated with a big party for the citizens at the first weekend in October under the slogan "Golden Times". Up to 2013 the savings from that surpluses had strongly diminished again by the budget deficits of the following years.

=== Transport ===
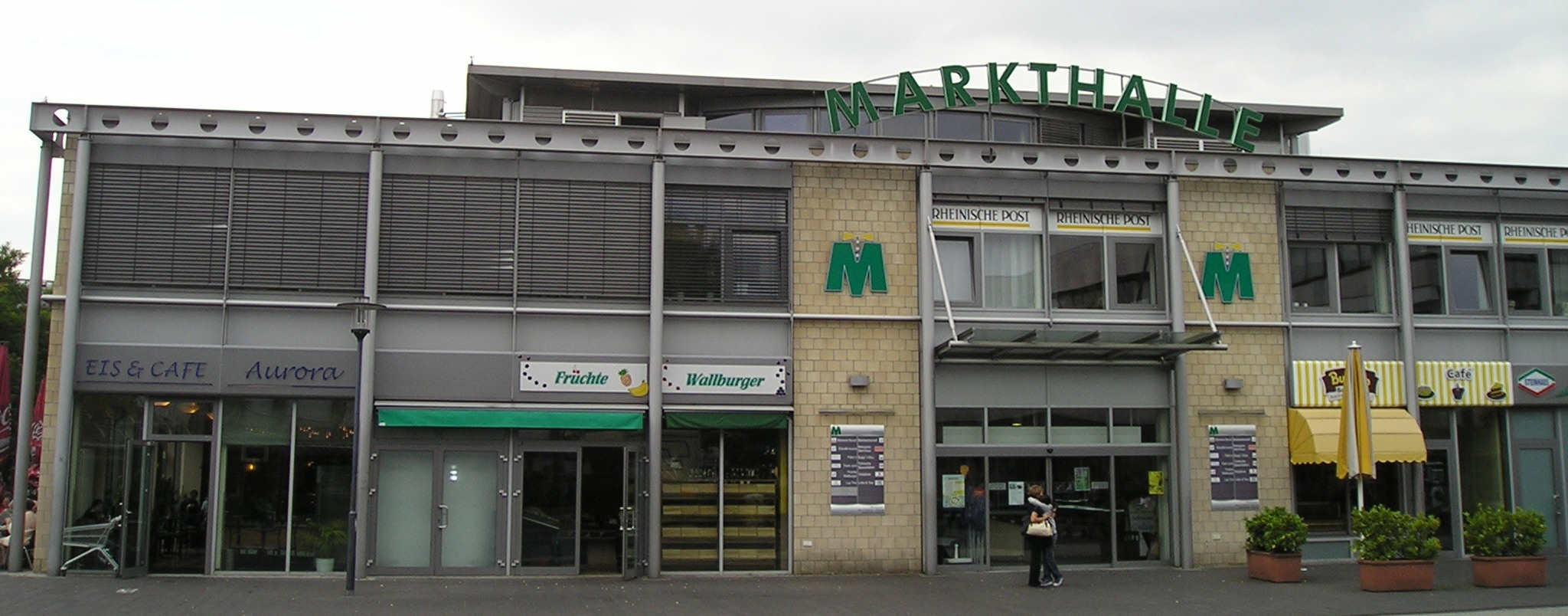
Markthalle

Langenfeld is accessed by nearby highways A 3, A 59 and A 542, as well as the Bundesstrasse (federal route) B8. The mainline railway from Düsseldorf to Cologne runs through the town's area as well. Public transport is provided by the S-Bahn line S6 and various bus lines operating under the umbrella of the VRR.

The nearest airports are Düsseldorf Airport (approx. 28 km) and Cologne Bonn Airport (approx. 35 km).

== Twin towns – sister cities ==
Langenfeld is twinned with:

- (Republic of Ireland) Ennis, Ireland
- Gostynin, Poland
- Montale, Italy
- Senlis, France

== Notable people ==
- Hans Anhalt, (1908 – 1975), Auschwitz guard and convicted war criminal
- Herbert Reul (born 1952), politician (CDU)
- Christian Menzel (born 1971), racing driver
- Cora Schumacher (born 1976), actress, model, racing driver and television presenter

== Gallery ==
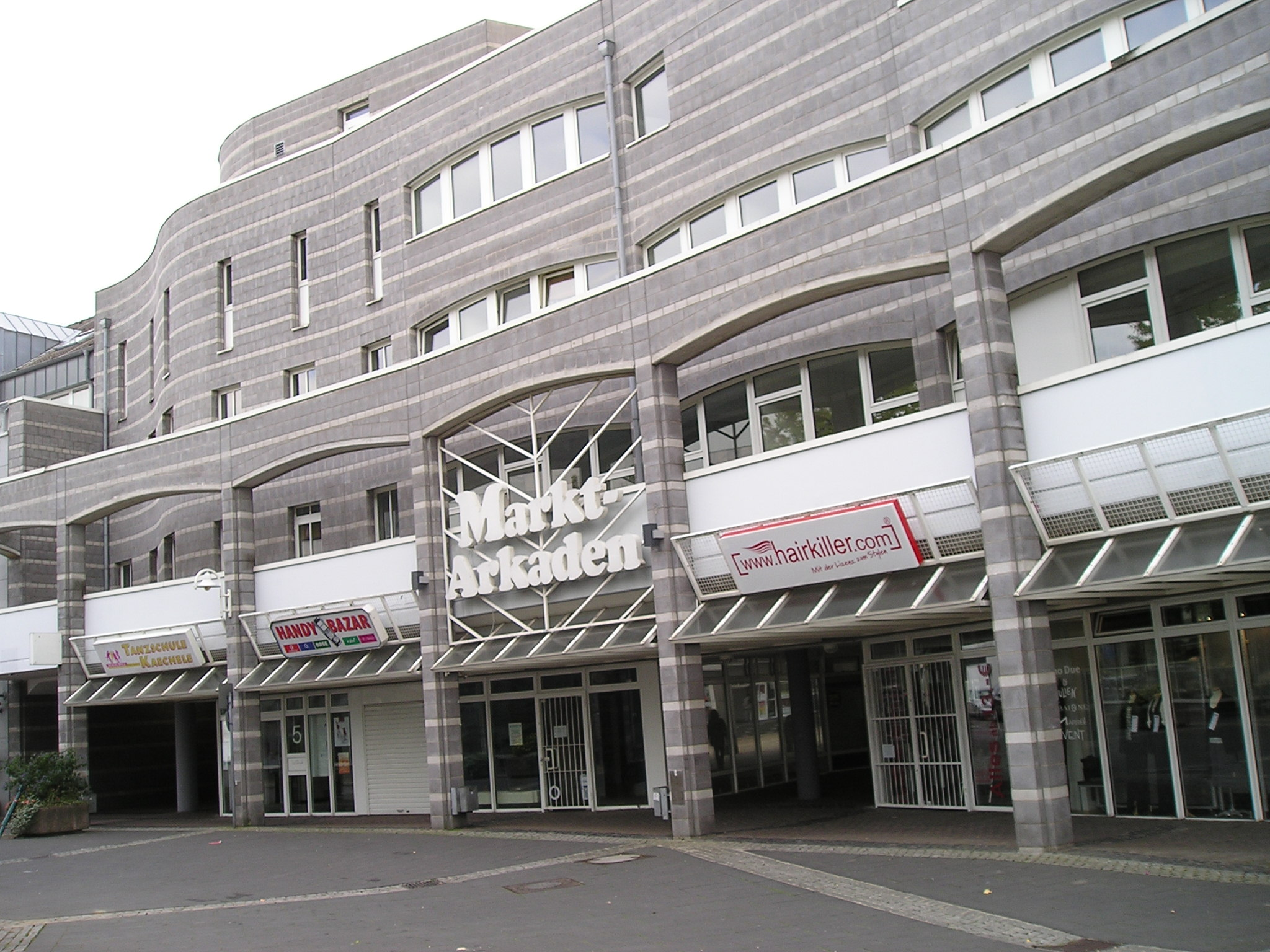
Marktarkaden

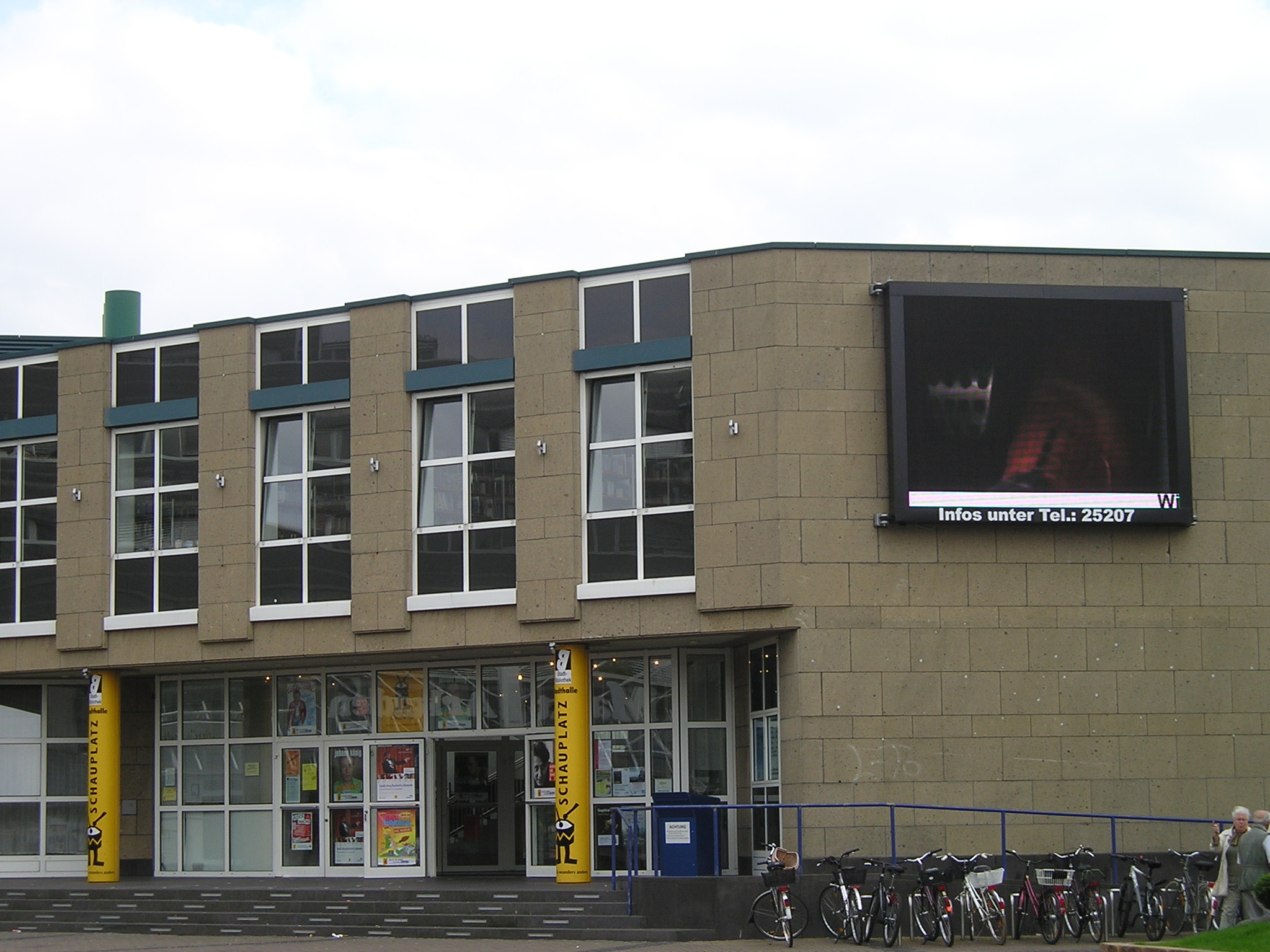
Stadthalle with Schauplatz
