= Bundesstraße 28 =

Federal highway in Germany

B 28
- Bundesstraße 28

Route information
- Length: 250 km (160 mi)

Location
- Country: Germany
- States: Baden-Württemberg

Highway system
- Roads in Germany; Autobahns; List; Federal; List; State; E-roads

Bundesstraße 28 or B 28 is a German federal road. The road runs west through Baden-Württemberg from the eastern terminus of the French route nationale 4 in Strasbourg, after crossing the Rhine river in Kehl, to Senden in Bavaria, where it terminates into the A7.

== Cities crossed ==
- Freudenstadt
- Tübingen
- Reutlingen
- Ulm
- Senden

== See also ==
- List of federal highways in Germany
