= Bundesautobahn 250 =

Federal motorway in Germany

A 250
- Bundesautobahn 250
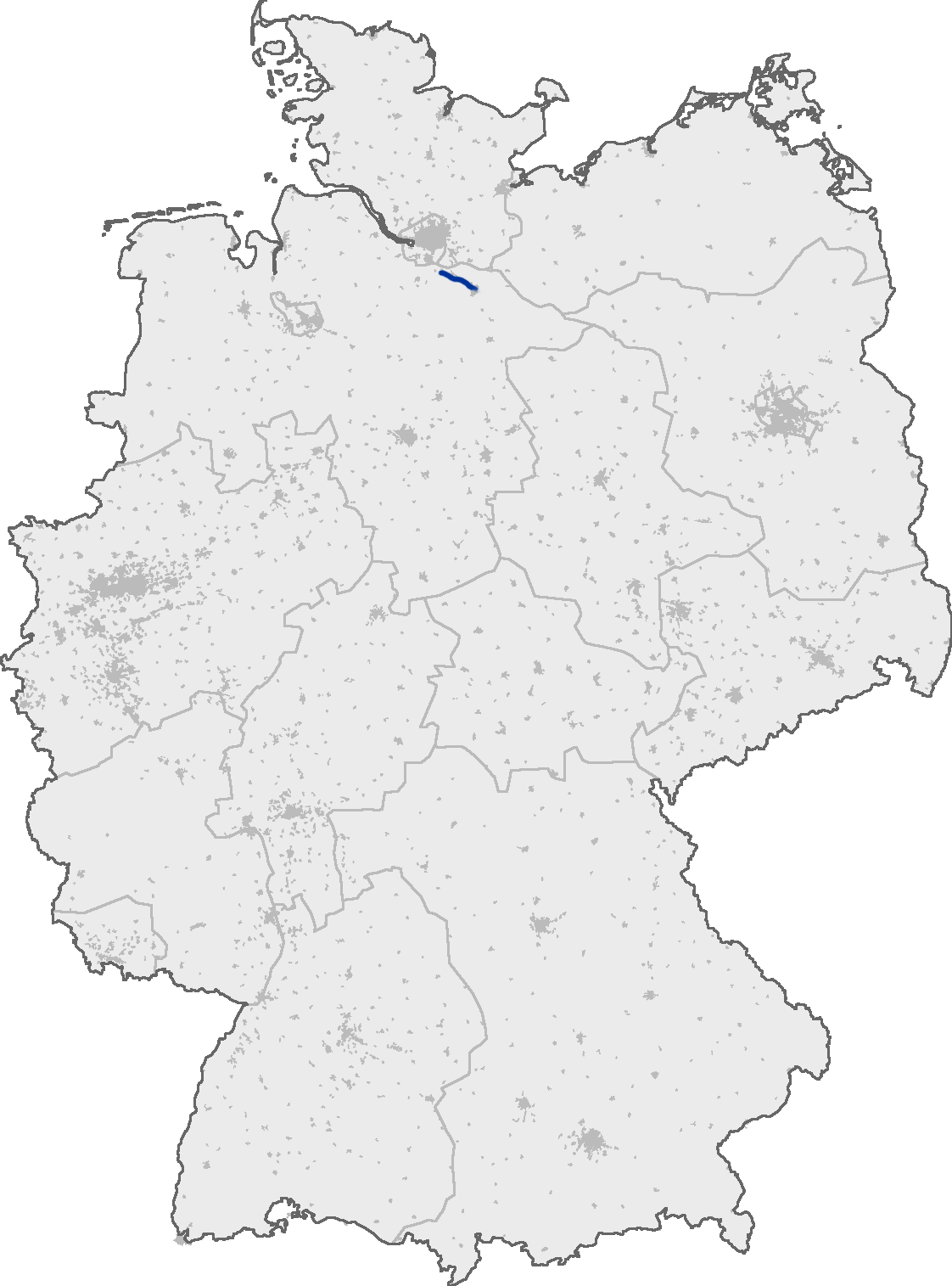

Route information
- Length: 28 km (17 mi)
- Existed: 1985 (First part)–2010
- History: Became a portion of A 39

Location
- Country: Germany
- States: Lower Saxony

Highway system
- Roads in Germany; Autobahns; List; Federal; List; State; E-roads

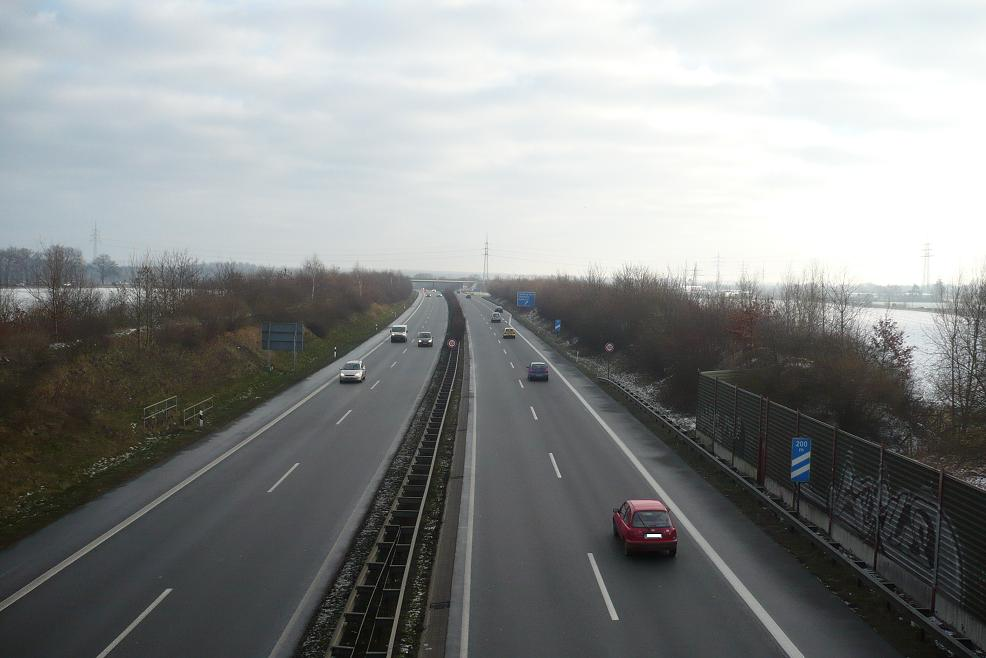
View of the Lüneburg-Nord junction on the A 250 (looking towards Lüneburg)

Bundesautobahn 250 (translates from German as Federal Motorway 250, short form Autobahn 250, abbreviated as BAB 250 or A 250) was an autobahn in north Germany, which was colloquially referred to as the Maschener Autobahn ("Maschen Motorway"). It began near Hamburg and ran in an easterly direction for 28 kilometres to Lüneburg, where it became the B 4 and later the B 209. The motorway had two lanes throughout and was opened in four sections: 1985: AK Maschen – AS Maschen 1987: AS Maschen – AS Winsen (Luhe)-West 1991: AS Winsen (Luhe)-West – AS Winsen (Luhe)-Ost 1995: AS Winsen (Luhe)-Ost – Lüneburg-Nord

When the planned junction from the A 250 to the A 39 from Wolfsburg is built there will be a motorway straight through from the industrial region of Brunswick and Salzgitter to the Hamburg ports. The motorway was completed in 2010 and the A 250 became part of the A 39.

== Junction lists ==
| km | Exit | Name | Destinations | Notes |
|---|---|---|---|---|
| | 1 | Maschen Kreuz (Westteil) | A 1 / E45 | |
| | 1 | Maschen Kreuz (Ostteil) | A 7 / E22 | |
| | 2 | Maschen | B 4 | |
| | 3 | Winsen (Luhe)-West | | |
| | RSA | RSA | | |
| | 4 | Winsen (Luhe)-Ost | | |
| | RSA | Busschewald/Roddau RSA | | |
| | 5 | Handorf | B 404 | |
| | 6 | Lüneburg-Nord | | |
Transition to B 4 / B 209
