= Kreuz Oranienburg =

- Dreieck Oranienburg

Location
- Oranienburg, Germany
- Coordinates: 52°42′19″N 13°11′41″E
- Roads at junction: A 111; A 10; B 96

Construction
- Type: Cloverleaf with semi-direct link
- Lanes: 2x4/2x4/2x5
- Opened: 1982 (cloverleaf edited in the early 21st century)

The Kreuz Oranienburg (German:Autobahndreieck Kreuz Oranienburg) is a partial cloverleaf with a semi-direct link in the German state Brandenburg in the Metropolitan region of Berlin.

The interchange connects the A111 from Dreieck Charlottenburg in Berlin and the B96 from Oranienburg to the A10, the Berlin Beltway.

== Geography ==
The interchange lies in the municipal areas of Leegebruch and Velten in the Landkreis Oberhavel. The nearby cities and villages are Oberkrämer, Oranienburg, Birkenwerder and Hohen Neuendorf. The interchange is approximately 25 km northwest of the centre of Berlin.

Near the interchange lies the nature reserve Naturpark Barnim and the river Havel, that is crossed by both motorways.

== History ==
The interchange was opened is 1982 as a trumpet. In the early 21st century the B 96 coming from the Oranienburg-bypass had also to be linked to the Berlin beltway A10. To make this connection, a new cloverleaf was built east of the existing interchange.

== Manual traffic count near the interchange ==
| From | To | Daily traffic counts | Percentage heavy traffic |
|---|---|---|---|
| AS Oberkrämer (A 10) | AD Kreuz Oranienburg | 51,100 | 13.6% |
| AD Kreuz Oranienburg | AS Birkenwerder (A 10) | 42,500 | 12.3% |
| AD Kreuz Oranienburg | AS Hennigsdorf (A 111) | 45,400 | 9.6% |
| AD Kreuz Oranienburg | OHV Oranienburg (B 96) | 22,800 | 9.5% |
