= Lamoral von Taxis =

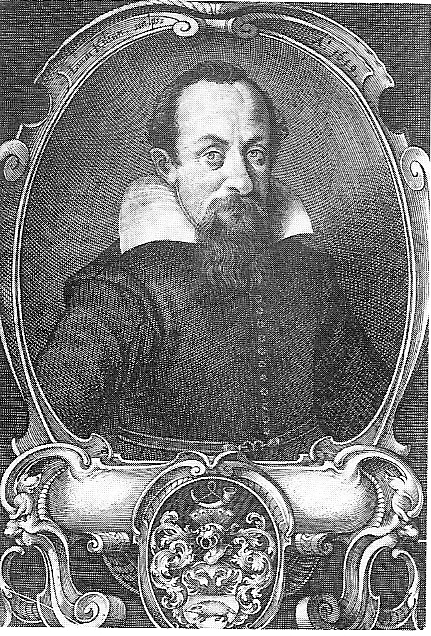
Lamoral I, Freiherr von Taxis, by Lucas Kilian, Augsburg 1619

Lamoral, Graf von Taxis (1557 - 7 July 1624, Brussels) was an official in the Spanish Netherlands.

== Biography ==
He was the son of the general postmaster Leonard I, Freiherr von Taxis (1522, Mechelen – 1612, Brussels), by his second wife, Louise Boisot de Rouha (d. 1610).

In 1579 he married Genoveva von Taxis, the youngest daughter of the Augsburg postmaster Seraphin II von Taxis. They had three children, two sons and a daughter.

In 1606, he and his father were appointed imperial officials, and on 16 January 1608 they were elevated to the rank of Freiherr (Baron of the Holy Roman Empire). On 27 July 1615 he became hereditary general postmaster and on 8 June 1624 - a month before his death - an Imperial count.

He is also known as Lamoral I to distinguish him from his nephew Lamoral Claudius Franz von Thurn und Taxis.
