= Bundesstraße 8 =

Federal highway in Germany

B 8
- Bundesstraße 8

Route information
- Length: 800 km (500 mi)

Major junctions
- Northwest end: Netherlands border in Emmerich am Rhein, North Rhine-Westphalia
- Southeast end: Bundesstraße 12 in Passau, Bavaria near the Austrian border

Location
- Country: Germany
- States: North Rhine-Westphalia, Rhineland-Palatinate, Hesse, Bavaria

Highway system
- Roads in Germany; Autobahns; List; Federal; List; State; E-roads

The Bundesstraße 8 (abbr. B8) is a German federal highway in southwestern Germany of great historical importance. It has existed since the 9th century, known then as Via Publica, and until recent times was a key trade route linking the towns of Brussels, Duisburg, Cologne, Frankfurt, Würzburg, Nuremberg, Regensburg and Passau. Today it has been replaced as a main route by the A3 motorway, which runs parallel to it.

== History ==
The Via Publica (later known as the Poststraße or Handelsstraße) was first mentioned in 839 in a diploma of Louis the Pious. In the Middle Ages it joined the commercial cities of Cologne, Frankfurt, Nuremberg and Regensburg. The Steinerne Brücke bridge in Regensburg (1135–46), the Innbrücke bridge in Passau (1143), the Lahnbrücke bridge in Limburg (completed 1341) and the main bridges in Würzburg (1133), Frankfurt (before 1222) and Kitzingen (before 1300) are among the oldest stone bridges in central Europe and testify to the historical importance of this road.

In 1615, the general postmaster Lamoral von Taxis was tasked by emperor Matthias with setting up a postal route between Brussels and Prague, via Frankfurt and Nuremberg. To achieve this the Via Publica was expanded to Poststraße. The present day Bundesstraße 8 is largely identical to the Via Publica. The medieval trade route largely used dry level roads rather than the valleys, which were swampy and impassible after rain. Part of the Via Publcia was referred to as the Mauspfad.

== See also ==
- Transport in Germany
- List of federal highways in Germany (in English)
- List of federal highways in Germany (in German)
