= Bundesstraße 27 =

Federal highway in Germany

B 27
- Bundesstraße 27

Route information
- Length: 683 km (424 mi)

Location
- Country: Germany
- States: Saxony-Anhalt, Lower Saxony, Hesse, Bavaria, Baden-Württemberg

Highway system
- Roads in Germany; Autobahns; List; Federal; List; State; E-roads

Bundesstraße 27 or B27 is a German federal road. It connects Blankenburg am Harz with Rafz in Switzerland.

== Route ==
The Bundesstraße 27 crosses the following states and towns (north to south):

- Saxony-Anhalt: Blankenburg am Harz
- Lower Saxony: Braunlage, Göttingen
- Hesse: Sontra, Bad Hersfeld, Fulda
- Bavaria: Hammelburg, Würzburg
- Baden-Württemberg: Tauberbischofsheim, Heilbronn, Ludwigsburg, Stuttgart, Tübingen, Rottweil, Donaueschingen, Jestetten

The B27 is interrupted in two places: between Würzburg and Tauberbischofsheim, where it has been replaced by the motorways A3 and A81, and between Randen and Jestetten, where it crosses through Switzerland. The part south of Stuttgart follows the Schweizer Straße (Suisse road), a chaussee from 18th century.

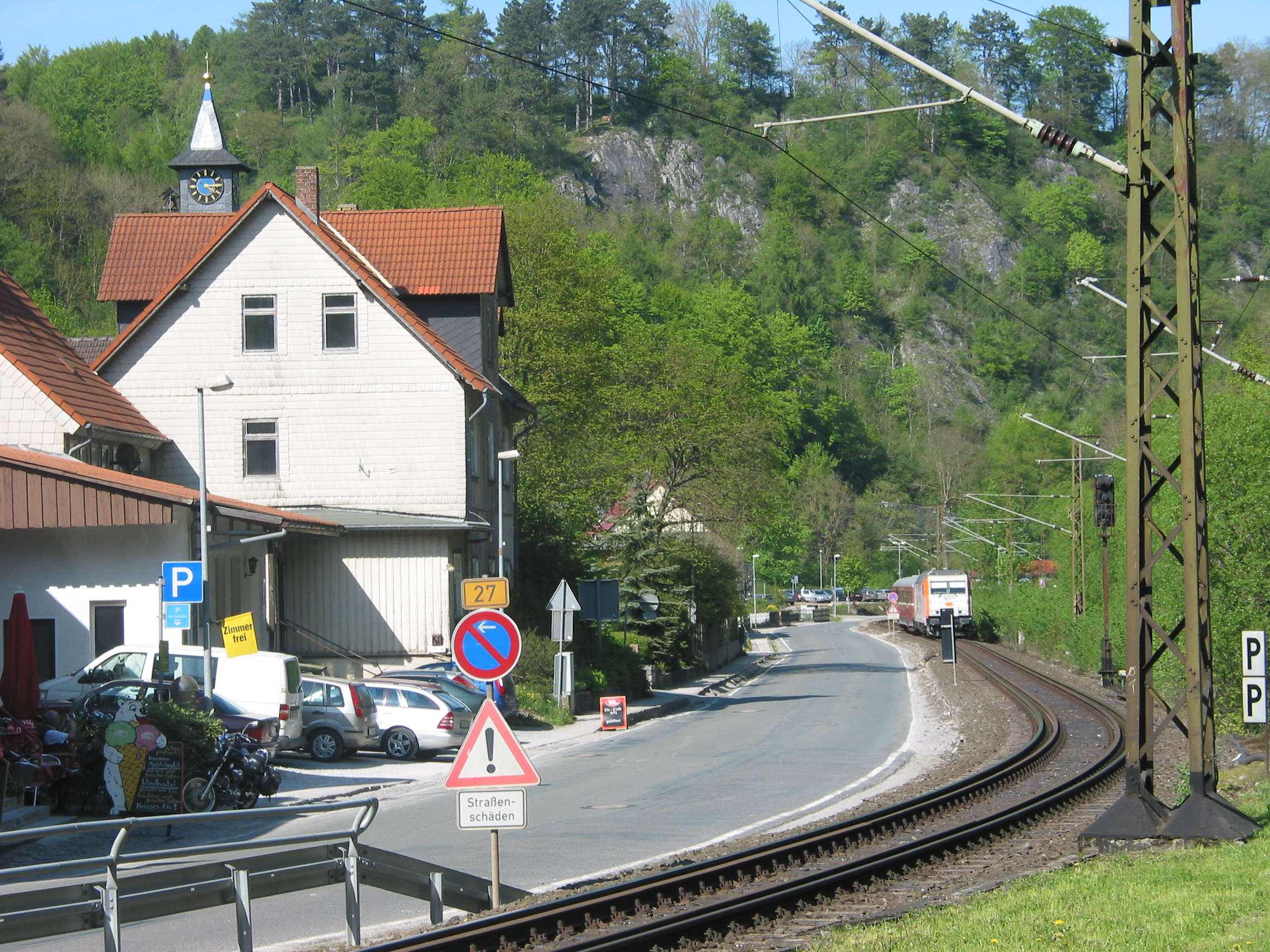
in the Harz mountains

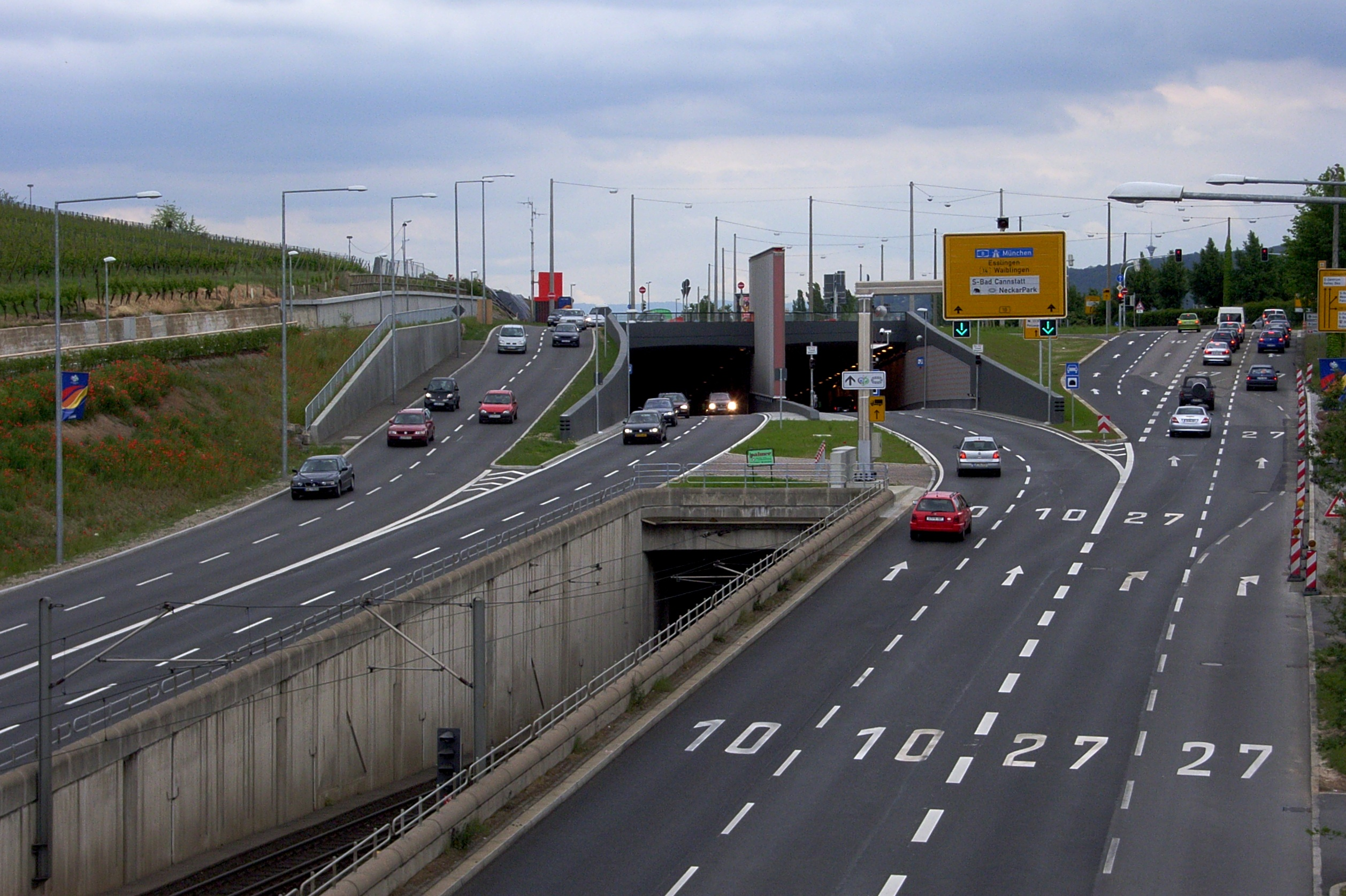
interchange with B 10 in Stuttgart

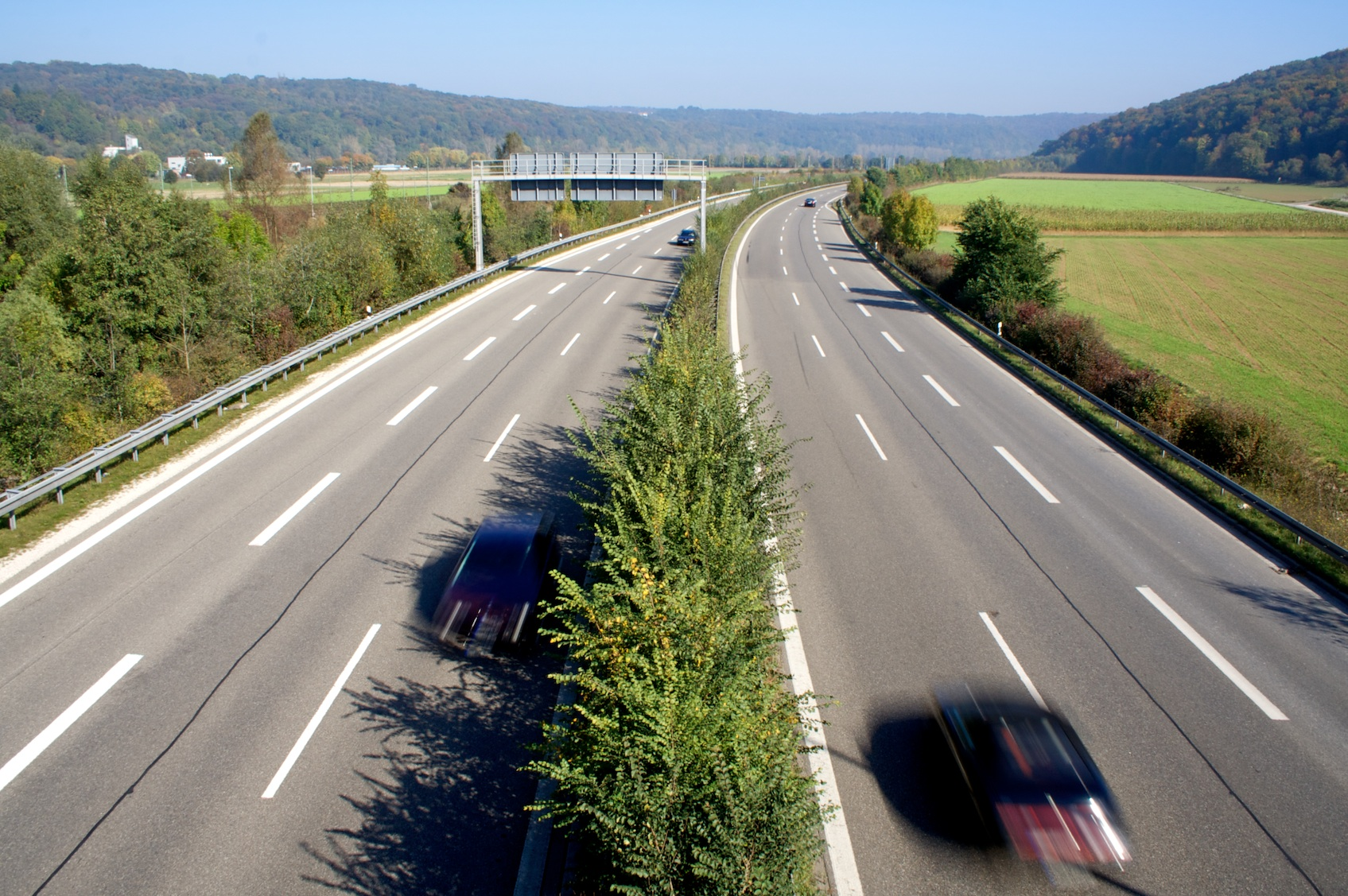
in the Neckar valley

== See also ==
- List of federal highways in Germany
