= Bundesstraße 51 =

Federal highway in Germany

B 51
- Bundesstraße 51

Route information
- Length: 570 km (350 mi)

Major junctions
- North end: Bremen
- South end: Kleinblittersdorf

Location
- Country: Germany
- States: Bremen, Lower Saxony, North Rhine-Westphalia, Rhineland-Palatinate, Saarland

Highway system
- Roads in Germany; Autobahns; List; Federal; List; State; E-roads

The Bundesstraße 51 (translates from German Federal road, abbreviated as B 51) runs from Bremen in south-west direction though Lower Saxony, North Rhine-Westphalia, Rhineland-Palatinate and Saarland, and ends at the French border in the town Kleinblittersdorf.

== See also ==
- Transport in Germany
