= Wallau =

The Coat of Arms of Wallau

Wallau (German pronunciation: [ˈvalaʊ]) in Taunus is a quarter of Hofheim in Main-Taunus-Kreis in Hesse, Germany, and has a population of 4,442 (as of 31 December 2019).

An archaeological testament to the prehistoric occupation of the area was made when rich Celtic graves were discovered on the west edge of the village in 1959. The first documentary mention of Wallau is in a 950 deed from a donation of Otto I in which the village is referred to as Wanaloha. In 1563 a Latin school was founded and in 1572 a weekly market.

Wallau became part of Hofheim in 1977.

== Transport ==
Wallau is located at the Wiesbadener Kreuz (Wiesbaden Junction), where the Autobahnen (motorways) A3 and A66 meet. The village is accessible by an exit from A66.

There are several bus stops from where buses connect Wallau with Wiesbaden, Hofheim, Hochheim and Kriftel.

By 2024, construction is planned to begin on Wallauer Spange, a railway link connecting the two existing rails from Wiesbaden and Frankfurt going north. This measure is supposed to shorten travel times from Frankfurt and Darmstadt to Wiesbaden by several minutes. Also, the plans include building a station where the rails pass Wallau near the L 3019 road south of the village.

== Economy ==
In the east of Wallau, on the other side of A3 motorway, there is a business park, where numerous companies and some supermarkets are based.

In the south, near the motorway exit, IKEA operates a store also serving as headquarters of the company in Germany.
