= Wiesbadener Kreuz =

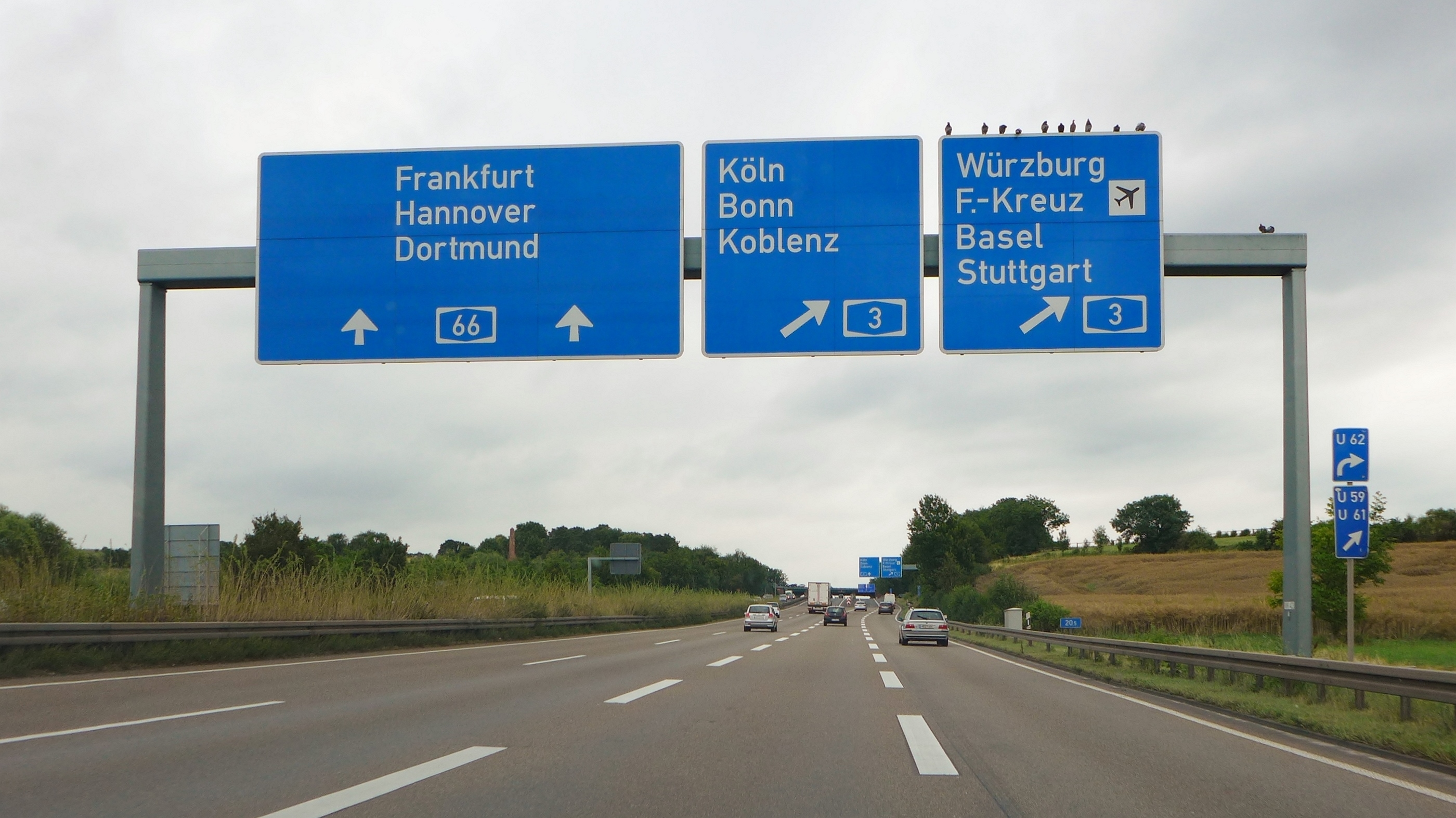
- A sign gantry over the western approach of the A 66 to Wiesbadener Kreuz
- Interactive map of Wiesbadener Kreuz

Location
- Hochheim am Main, Germany
- Coordinates: 50°3′20.1″N 8°23′16.4″E
- Roads at junction: A 3; A 66

Construction
- Lanes: 2x2
- Opened: 23 September 1939

The Wiesbadener Kreuz is a full cloverleaf interchange near the Hessian state capital of Wiesbaden in Germany where the Autobahnen A3 and A66 meet. It lies within the northeastern edge of Hochheim am Main. The interchange was opened in 1939 and was one of the first interchanges in Germany.

Used by approximately 210,000 vehicles per day, it is one of the most frequented interchanges in Hesse and Germany.

The portion of the A3 between the Wiesbadener Kreuz and Kreuz Fürth/Erlangen is traditionally one of the most congested sections of Autobahn in Germany.

The road has over the years undergone many projects to improve traffic flow and repairing/replacing the surface, including replacing the bridges that take the A3 over the A66.

== Redesign ==
In April 2011 planning was begun for a move away from the cloverleaf shape to something more suitable for higher traffic volumes, specially to remove two of the 270 degree turns. Instead, it was proposed to adopt a variant which was developed by the Hessian Road and Traffic Administration of two left-turning, semi-direct connecting arcs. The connecting ramps of the routes between Wiesbaden and Würzburg as well as between Cologne and Frankfurt are to be run in two lanes. The planned variant is the best solution in terms of road safety, environmental compatibility and economic efficiency. The published site plan for the project seems to require a new implementation of the Wandersmann monument. A specific time frame for the start of the construction work was not set and as of September 2021 no further work along these lines has been developed, and the interchange is not listed for any forthcoming projects according to Autobahn GmbH.

== Traffic volume ==
The interchange is after the Frankfurter Kreuz and the Offenbacher Kreuz the most congested Autobahn interchanges in Hessen with approx. 210.000 Vehicles per day.

From	To	Average daily vehicles			HGVs %		
From	To	2005	2010	2015	2005	2010	2015
AS Wiesbaden/Niedernhausen (A 3)	Wiesbadener Kreuz	94.500	96.800	104.500	13,3 %	14,0 %	13,3 %
Wiesbadener Kreuz	AS Raunheim (A 3)	94.800	98.900	101.700	12,9 %	13,6 %	14,0 %
AS Wallau (A 66)	Wiesbadener Kreuz	103.800	111.200	117.300	5,2 %	6,0 %	5,0 %
Wiesbadener Kreuz	AS Diedenbergen (A 66)	69.600	73.200	98.800	5,7 %	5,5 %	5,0 %
