= Offenbacher Kreuz =

Interchange in Germany

- Interactive map of Offenbacher Kreuz

Location
- Offenbach am Main, Germany
- Coordinates: 50°3′52.7″N 8°43′37.27″E: A 661; A 3 E43

Construction
- Type: Cloverleaf interchange
- Lanes: 2x2/2x3
- Opened: 1976

The Offenbacher Kreuz is a cloverleaf interchange in the Frankfurt Rhine-Main Metropolitan Region in the German state of Hesse.

The motorway interchange forms the connection between the relatively short north-south A661, and the northwest-southeast A3 that runs from the Dutch border to the Austrian border.

== Geography ==
The motorway interchange lies within the city limits of Offenbach am Main, after which it is named. Nearby cities and villages are Neu-Isenburg, Frankfurt am Main, Heusenstamm, Dietzenbach, and Dreieich. The interchange lies approximately 5 km south of the city centre of Frankfurt and approximately 5 km southwest of the city centre of Offenbach. To the west is the Frankfurt airport and Frankfurter Kreuz.

== History ==
The A3 between the exit Frankfurt-Süd and the Offenbacher Kreuz was opened in 1957 and in 1958 lengthened to exit Hanau. In 1976 the Offenbacher Kreuz was opened together with the opening of the A661 between Offenbach and Dreieich.

== Configuration ==
The Offenbacher Kreuz is a cloverleaf interchange and to the north side of it is a motorway split connecting the B3 coming from Frankfurt and vice versa to the A661. Not far east from the interchange the B3 merges to the A3 in a trumpet interchange. Near and at the interchange both motorways have sliproads, these have one lane except the parts between the indirect links which have two lanes.

== Road layout ==
Coming from the west, the A3 between the Frankfurter Kreuz and the Offenbacher Kreuz has a 2x4 layout. To the east towards Würzburg, the A3 has 2x3 lanes. The A661 has a 2x3 layout, from the separation of the sliproad and the A3 to the east also has three lanes.

== Future ==
There are plans to widen A3 to 2x4 lanes between Offenbacher Kreuz and exit Hanau. Doing so requires reconstruction of the interchange.

== Traffic near the interchange ==
After the Frankfurter Kreuz, this is the second most frequently used interchange in Hesse, with approximately 215,000 vehicles passing it on a daily basis.

From	To	Average daily traffic
AS Frankfurt-Süd (A 3)	Offenbacher Kreuz	150,700
Offenbacher Kreuz	AS Obertshausen (A 3)	119,700
AS Offenbach-Taunusring (A 661)	Offenbacher Kreuz	95,100
Offenbacher Kreuz	AS Neu-Isenburg (A 661)	66,500
