= Bundesstraße 455 =

Federal highway in Germany

B 455
- Bundesstraße 455
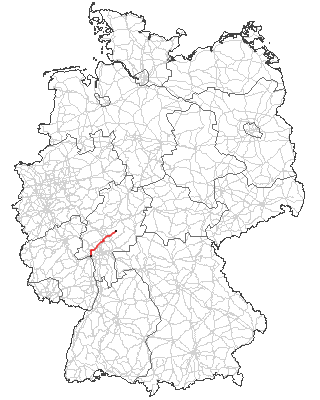

Route information
- Length: 100 km (62 mi)

Major junctions
- From: Schotten
- To: Mainz-Kastel

Location
- Country: Germany
- States: Hesse

Highway system
- Roads in Germany; Autobahns; List; Federal; List; State; E-roads

Bundesstraße 455 (abbreviated B-455) is a German Bundesstraße (German for "federal highway") in the federal state of Hesse. The route runs southwest from Schotten in Vogelsbergkreis to Mainz-Kastel, a borough of the Hessian capital city of Wiesbaden.

== Route ==
Bundesstraße 455 begins in Schotten in Vogelsbergkreis. The road continues through the Wetteraukreis, including the municipalities of Nidda, Wölfersheim, Friedberg and Rosbach vor der Höhe. Route 455 merges with Bundesautobahn 5 (A-5) at the Friedberg exit and follows this autobahn to the Bad Homburg interchange. It then follows Bundesautobahn 661 (A-661) to its source in Oberursel-Nord.

Bundesstraße 455 originally went through Bad Homburg vor der Höhe and Friedrichsdorf. These parts of the route were replaced by the A-5 and A-661 sections, and the original highway has now been downgraded to a state road (Landesstraße). Nevertheless, the signs on B-455 from Königstein as well as from Friedberg continue to refer to Bad Homburg.

From Oberursel-Nord, Bundesstraße 455 then takes the so-called "Northern Bypass" (Nordumgehung) around Oberursel. Before this tunnel was built, the route originally went through Oberursel. After its construction, the former route was downgraded to a state road (L 3004) and a district highway (Kreisstraße, K 772).

Bundesstraße 455 then continues through Königstein im Taunus and Eppstein. It crosses the A-3 and enters Wiesbaden's northeast suburbs. Bundesstraße 455 ends at the Rhine River at the Theodor Heuss Bridge in Mainz-Kastel, a borough of Wiesbaden.

== Junction lists ==
	Schotten B 276
	Nidda-Harb B 457
	Wölfersheim-Berstadt B 489
(37)	Wölfersheim A 45
	Friedberg B 3 B 275
(16)	Friedberg A 5 replaced with A 5
(17)	Bad Homburger Kreuz A 661 replaced with A 661
(1)	Oberursel-Nord A 661 B 456
	Tunnel Northern Bypass
	Kronberg
	Königstein B 8/ B 519
	Eppstein
(46)	Wiesbaden/Niedernhausen A 3
	Wiesbaden 2. Ring B 54
	Wiesbaden-Erbenheim
(6)	Kreuz Wiesbaden-Erbenheim A 66
	Wiesbaden-Erbenheim South
(3)	Kreuz Mainz-Kastel A 671
	Mainz-Kastel B 40 B 43

=== Municipalities ===
- Hessen
  - Vogelsbergkreis
    - Schotten
  - Wetteraukreis
    - Nidda, Wölfersheim, Friedberg (Hessen), Rosbach vor der Höhe
  - Hochtaunuskreis
    - Friedrichsdorf, Oberursel (Taunus), Königstein im Taunus
  - Main-Taunus-Kreis
    - Kelkheim (Taunus), Eppstein
  - Stadt Wiesbaden
