= Bombing of Dietzenbach in World War II =

The bombing of Dietzenbach in 1941 was an air attack by the Royal Air Force, against the then-rural village of Dietzenbach in Hesse. It is believed that the bombers involved could not find their intended target, either Frankfurt or Offenbach, and therefore attacked the village of Dietzenbach, populated by roughly 3,000 inhabitants, as an opportunity target, or in error.

Late on the evening of Saturday, 20 September 1941, four bombers attacked the central part of Dietzenbach. Many villagers had just enjoyed a performance of a harmonica club in the atrium of the Neue Löwe inn and were gradually making their way home. When the air-raid alarm sounded, it was not initially taken very seriously, because the attack was believed to be directed at either Frankfurt or Offenbach but then explosive bombs, incendiary bombs and phosphorus canisters began falling on the village and within ten minutes, large parts of the town center were on fire.

The volunteer fire department of the village, with its two motorized water hoses, could not contain the large fire. Even when firefighters from the neighbouring villages came to help, the water supply that was available was inadequate. Only with the arrival of fire trucks from Offenbach at 1:30 in the morning were the fires gradually brought under control, and at about 11:00 the next morning, the fires were finally extinguished. Two residents were killed, three houses were destroyed, thirty others were severely damaged, and twelve barns and their contents were burned down.

Since bombs fell neither on Frankfurt nor on Offenbach that night, but rather on some smaller towns in the Rhine-Main area, and since the Royal Air Force later announced attacks on Frankfurt, it is assumed that the aircraft scheduled for Frankfurt did not find their target and then sought out alternative targets. The light shining from the door of the inn at random intervals as departing concert-goers left may have given the bomber crews some guidance.
