= Dietzenbach =

- Town
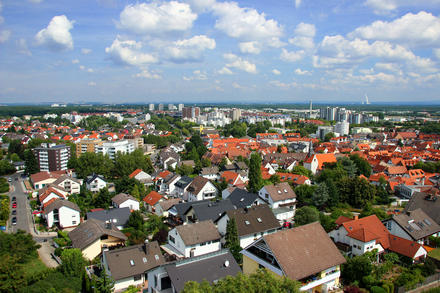
- Dietzenbach

- Coat of arms

- Location of Dietzenbach within Offenbach district
- Interactive map of Dietzenbach
- Location within Germany Location within Hesse
- Coordinates: 50°01′N 8°47′E
- Country: Germany
- State: Hesse
- Admin. region: Darmstadt
- District: Offenbach
- Subdivisions: 4 Stadtteile

Government
  - Mayor (2021–27): Dieter Lang (SPD)

Area
  - Total: 21.68 km^{2} (8.37 sq mi)
- Elevation: 135 m (443 ft)

Population (2025-12-31)
  - Total: 35,458
  - Density: 1,636/km^{2} (4,236/sq mi)
- Time zone: UTC+01:00 (CET)
  - Summer (DST): UTC+02:00 (CEST)
- Postal codes: 63128
- Dialling codes: 06074
- Vehicle registration: OF
- Website: www.dietzenbach.de

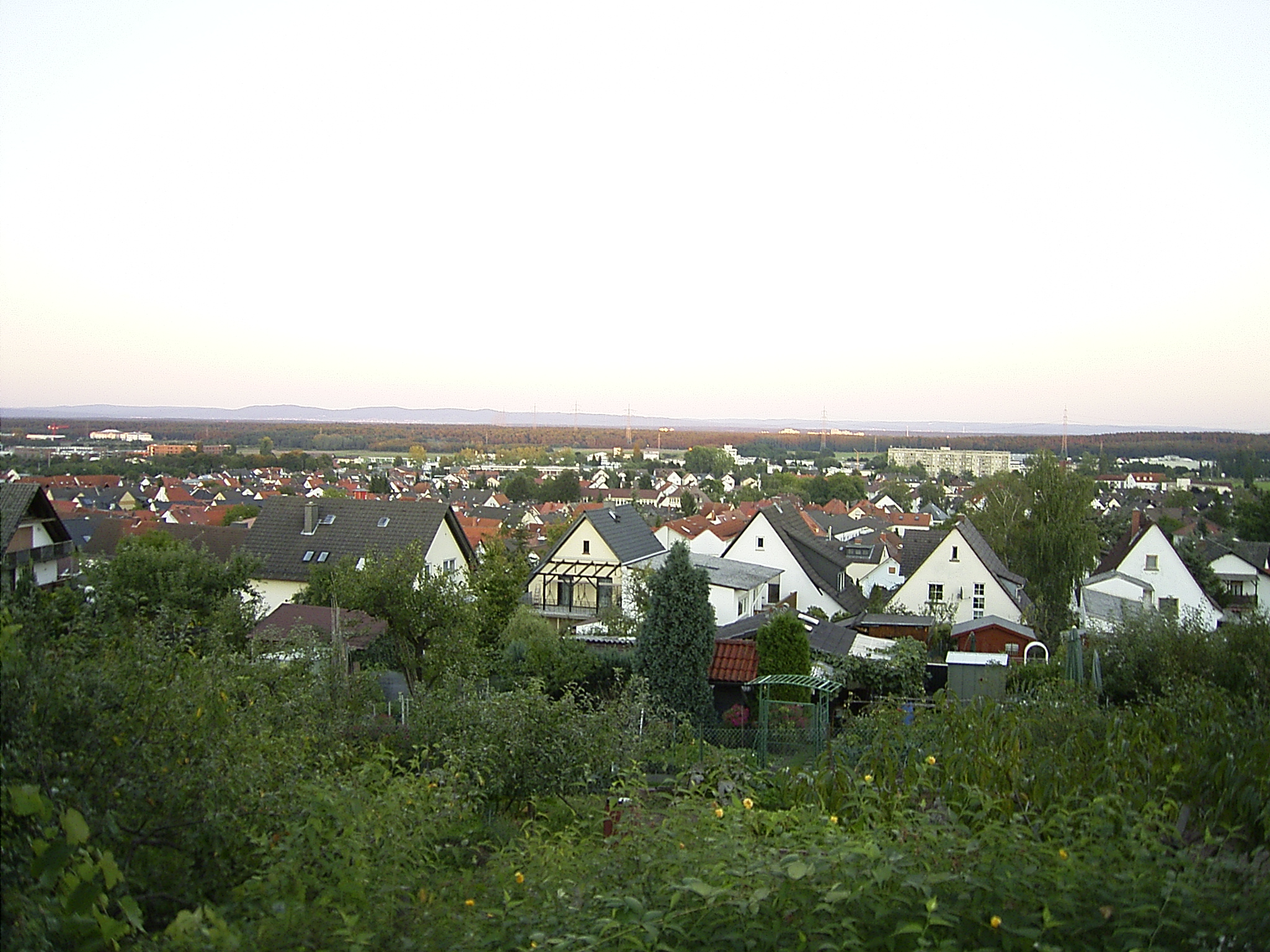
The town of Dietzenbach, seen from the Wingertsberg

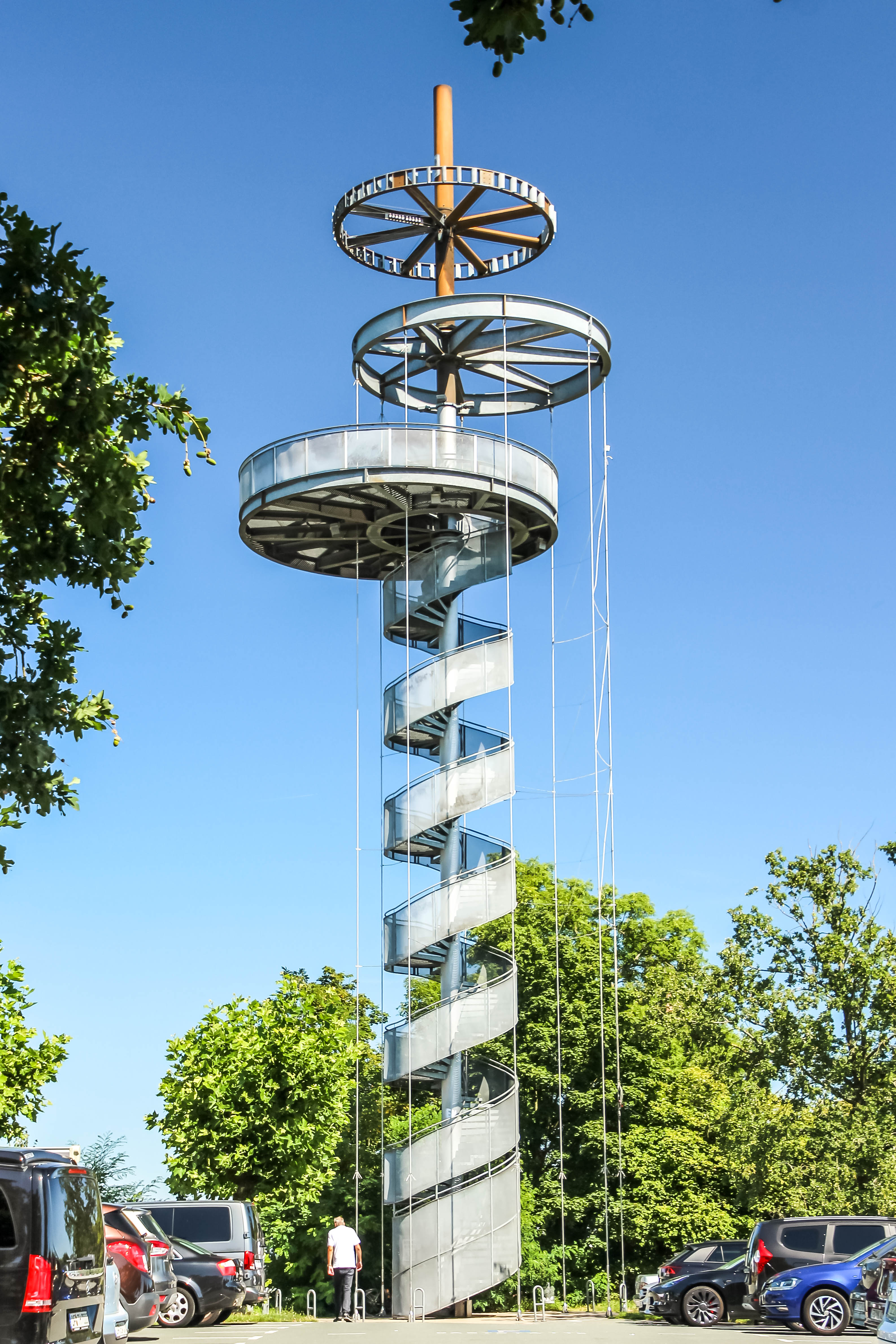
The lookout tower on the Wingertsberg

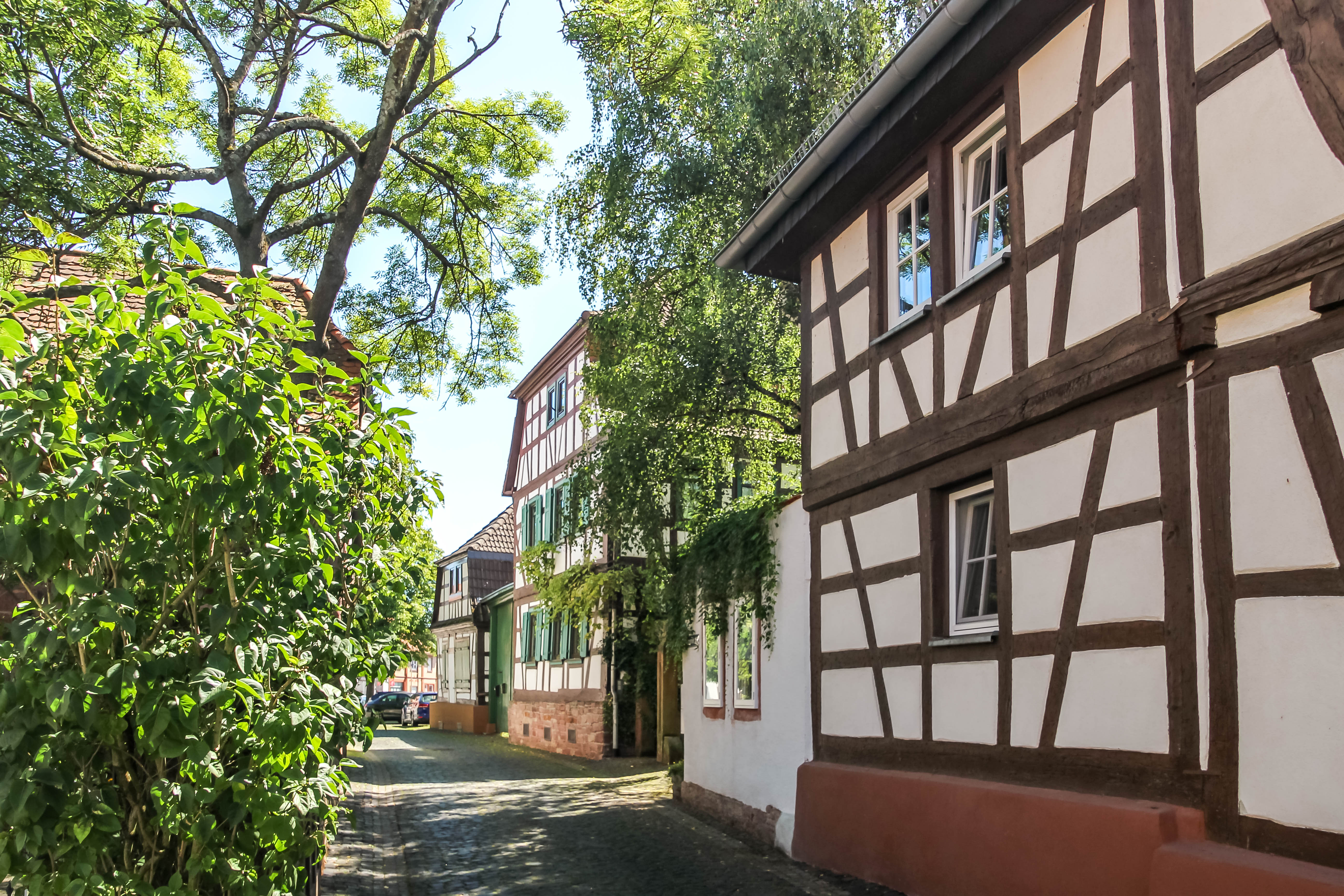
Timber-frame houses in the Old Town

Dietzenbach (German pronunciation: [ˈdiːtsn̩ˌbax]) is the seat of Offenbach district in the Regierungsbezirk of Darmstadt in Hesse, Germany and lies roughly 12 km southeast of Frankfurt am Main on the waterstream Bieber. Before the Second World War, the current town was a farming village with not quite 4,000 inhabitants. However, after the war, there was a considerable upswing in the population due to refugees settling in the community. From the 1970s onwards, Dietzenbach's population rose rapidly, reaching some 33,000 by 2006. Just under a third of the inhabitants have roots in more than a hundred nations outside Germany. Agricultural buildings are nowadays seldom seen in Dietzenbach.

In 2001, Dietzenbach hosted the 41st Hessentag state festival.

== Geography ==
=== Climate ===
Lying in the Upper Rhine Plain, the climate of the Offenbach (district) is temperate and influenced through southwestern trade winds. The temperature differences during the year are less. In Dietzenbach, the average high temperature of the warmest month is 26 °C, in the central valleys they are three degrees Celsius higher.

=== Neighbouring communities ===
Dietzenbach borders in the north on the town of Heusenstamm, in the east on the town of Rodgau, in the south on the town of Rödermark and in the west on the town of Dreieich.

=== Constituent communities ===
The town of Dietzenbach is made up of a number of Stadtteile, although not all places listed here have this official designation.

==== Steinberg ====
Steinberg is a constituent community. Parts of the north industrial area are found here, as well as daycare centres (Kindertagesstätten) 3,5 and 11, the Siedlerstraße Seniors’ Centre and four schools: Astrid-Lindgren-Schule (primary school), Regenbogenschule (primary school), Helen-Keller-Schule (special school) and Heinrich-Mann-Schule (coöperative comprehensive school with Gymnasium upper level). Furthermore, there is a sporting ground on Limesstraße. In the centre is the Steinberg Shopping Centre. Just under 12,000 people live in Steinberg.

==== Neue Stadtmitte ====
Between Steinberg and the old town centre, a new building area has sprung up over the years, in whose centre the town administration and Dietzenbach's community centre have settled. It is known as the Neue Stadtmitte – the New Town Centre.

Before this, the most prominent feature was a shopping centre with a big supermarket, filling station and carpark, which the locals over time came to see as an eyesore for its rather unappealing 1970s architecture and the company's neglect of the building.

Sales dealings kept delaying any new development. Finally, in late 2005, agreements between the town and the Dutch Ten Brinke Group were signed.

After the old toom Markt closed in mid-2005, the whole building complex was torn down in autumn 2006 to make way for a new shopping centre. The foundation stone was laid on 4 December 2006, and on 29 November 2007, the shopping centre opened, and was given the name Rathaus-Center.

The Ten Brinke Group, the €37,500,000 project's investor, built a 230 m-long and 101 m broad building in which are found, on 8 000 m² a toom Markt, and on 4 000 m² a Media-Markt. The rest of the 21 000 m² is shared among C&A (1 600 m²), Deichmann (two units of 500 m² each), the clothing chain Ernsting's Family (200 m²), other shops and various catering businesses.

==== Hexenberg ====
Hexenberg, whose name is German for “Witches’ Mountain”, is a constituent community. It is named after the highest elevation in Offenbach district. The buildings are mostly relatively low one-family and multiple-family dwellings as well as a few smaller shops in the middle of the community.

==== Wingertsberg ====
Wingertsberg (called der Wingertsberg in German) is not a constituent community as such, but rather a residential neighbourhood lying on a slope across from the Old Town. At the upper end of the neighbourhood are found, besides a sporting ground, a restaurant with a viewing terrace and the lookout tower built for the Hessentag state festival, from which it is possible to see Frankfurt.

==== Altstadt ====
In Dietzenbach's Old Town, many timber-frame houses have been preserved. Besides these, the Old Town is where the local history museum, the town library and the police station are to be found.

==== Spessartviertel (formerly Starkenburgring) ====
This constituent community, which borders right on the Old Town, is a neighbourhood built up with nothing but highrises. Originally planned as an upscale neighbourhood, social problems and the crime arising therefrom have brought the town and the surrounding area greater challenges than ever. Today, roughly 90% of the inhabitants have an immigration background. Most come from Turkey, Morocco, Afghanistan, Pakistan or various African countries.

== History ==
Dietzenbach had its first documentary mention about 1210 in a donation document to the Patershausen monastery as Dicenbah. The later forsaken settlements of Ippingshausen and Richolshausen lay within what are now Dietzenbach's limits in the Early Middle Ages.

In 1545, the Counts of Hanau, who had been Dietzenbach's lords for a few centuries, introduced Protestantism. When the Counts of Hanau died out in 1736, the Landgraves Hesse-Darmstadt and of Hesse-Kassel fought over who had the right to be Dietzenbach's lords.

The Amt of Schaafheim, with Dietzenbach, which lay within it, passed in 1773 to Hesse-Darmstadt. With the partition of the Rödermark in 1818, the community acquired its forest. In 1821, the Amt of Schaafheim was dissolved and Dietzenbach passed to the Landratsbezirk of Langen. However, by 1832 Dietzenbach had already been assigned to the district of Offenbach.

In 1898, the railway through Offenbach, Bieber and Heusenstamm to Dietzenbach was dedicated and the railway station was built, which is now once again in use, after many years of seeing no passenger service at all, by the Rhine-Main S-Bahn. The line underwent an extensive modernization for S-Bahn operation.

A British air raid in 1941 caused great damage in the community.

Dietzenbach was granted town rights in 1971. Since 2002, Dietzenbach has also been administrative seat of the district of Offenbach. However, it was only officially allowed to use the designation Kreisstadt (“District Seat”) beginning in March 2003 as the result of a dispute with the neighbouring town of Rodgau, which had demanded this status on the grounds that it had a greater population.

== Population development ==
Year	Inhabitants
2009	33,224
2007	34,773
2005	34,794
1997	33,015
1983	25,500
1970	12,449
1961	6,303
1950	4,711
1939	3,695
1834	3,695

In 1834, Dietzenbach had 3,695 inhabitants. One hundred and five years later, in 1939, it was 3,695. After the Second World War ended, 4,711 people lived in the community in 1950. In 1961, this had risen to 6,303. After extensive new development had been undertaken in the 1960s, the town's population in 1970 was 12,449. In 1983 it was 25,500 and in 1997 33,015, 30% of whom held citizenship other than German. According to census data Dietzenbach and Raunheim had the highest shares of Muslim migrants in Germany in 2011. According to one analysis, about a third of Dietzenbach's inhabitants were Muslim migrants in 2013.

== Politics ==
=== Mayors ===
- Christian Ebert, 1948–1958
- Hermann Kocks, 1958–1976
- Friedrich Keller (SPD), 1976–1988
- Frank Kaufmann (temporary) (Greens), 1988–1989
- Jürgen Heyer (SPD), 1989–2001
- Stephan Gieseler (CDU), 2001–2009
- Dietmar Kolmer (temporary) (CDU), 2009
- Jürgen Rogg (independent), 2009–2021
- Dr. Dieter Lang (SPD), 2021

=== Town council ===
The elections in March 2016 showed the following results:

- CDU = 11 seats
- SPD = 10 seats
- GRÜNE (The Greens) = 5 seats
- FDP = 3 seats
- LINKE (The Left) = 2 seats
- AfD = 7 seats
- FW (Free voters) = 1 seat
- WIR = 5 seats
- DL (Dietzenbach list) = 1 seat

=== Foreigners’ advisory council ===
Dietzenbach has an Ausländerbeirat – a foreigners’ advisory council – made up of 19 persons representing various nationalities with people from Turkey, Morocco, Italy, Pakistan, Afghanistan, India, Chile and Croatia. As with town council itself, there is a foreigners’ advisory council session, which takes place a fortnight before the town council session.

=== Coat of arms and flag ===
The town's arms might be described as a cobalt blue stream surrounded by two bunches of grapes on either side. The grapes refer to the town's wineries which came to an end in the 18th century but were revived in the 1960s on the Wingertsberg. The wavy blue stream refers to the town's name, interpreted as being from the Old High German for “babbling brook” or “Brook of Dietz” (compare here 775 Jahre Dietzenbach, published by Dietzenbach town executive). The town's current arms were determined by its community councillors in 1957 and approved by the then Hessian Interior Minister Schneider.

The town's flag consists of two narrower blue bands framing the broader yellow band in the middle, upon which appear the town's arms.

== Transport ==
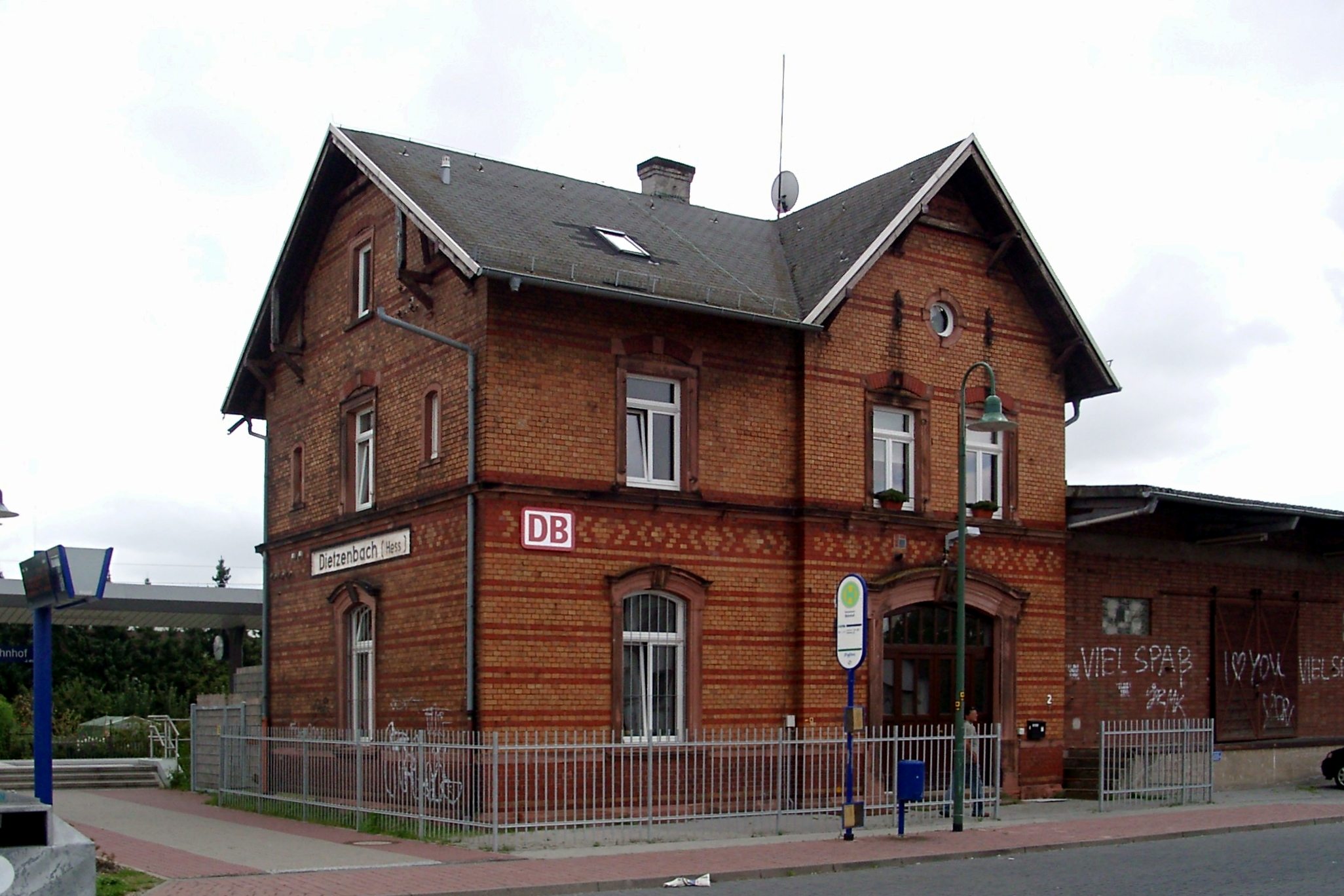
Dietzenbach station

Since late 2003, Dietzenbach is connected as the end-station with the suburban metropolitan network Frankfurt. Dietzenbach, Dietzenbach-Mitte and Dietzenbach-Steinberg stations have been served by the S-Bahn Line 2 (S2), which runs on the Niedernhausen – Hofheim – Frankfurt – Offenbach – Dietzenbach route. Dietzenbach moreover has at its disposal its own town bus network with a central bus station at the Dietzenbach Mitte S-Bahn station. Bus lines which cross Dietzenbach are the town lines OF-56 and 57, the county lines OF95, 96, 97 and 99 as well as night line n71. Bundesstraße 459, the Autobahnen A 3 and A 661 can be reached in a few minutes through the Offenbach interchange.

== Culture ==
=== Festival ===
Each year in Dietzenbach, the following festivals offer a chance to pursue social contacts:

- Apfelblütenfest is being held in April.
- Fest ohne Grenzen (“Festival Without Borders”), held at the Hessentagspark
- Fest der Biere (“Festival of Beers”), held at the Harmonieplatz, lasts five days
- Weinfest in the New Town Centre, runs ten days
- Nacht der Lichter(“Night of the Lights”)with "Museumsnacht" and "Heimatfest" held in the Old Town Centre
- Trinkbornfest in the Old Town on the first weekend in September
- Dietzenbacher Kelterfest about the "Äbbelwoi" and the making of it
- Kerb or Kirchweih, always held on the last weekend in October. It stretches along Landwehrstraße from Harmonieplatz to the Dietrich-Bonhoeffer-Schule (school). The revived tradition of the Kerbborsche – a group of young men who perform part of the ceremony – is an important part of the kermis.

=== Markets ===
So do the markets of the Town

- Altstadtmarkt (Old City Centre Market) where the old, traditionell Art is shown together with the modern, young Artists
- Kreativmarkt (creative Market) is a market for Creatives and Hobby Artists of the whole Rhein-Main-Area
- Weihnachtsmarkt (Christmas Market) on the first weekend in Advent

=== Places to Pray and to Believe ===
- The Earth
- Catholic parish of “Sankt Martin”
- Catholic church of “Hildegardis-Haus”
- Evangelical parish of “Martin-Luther”
- Evangelical Free Church (Pentecostal parish) of “Jesus-Gemeinde”
- Evangelical parish of “Rut”
- Evangelical “Christuskirchengemeinde”
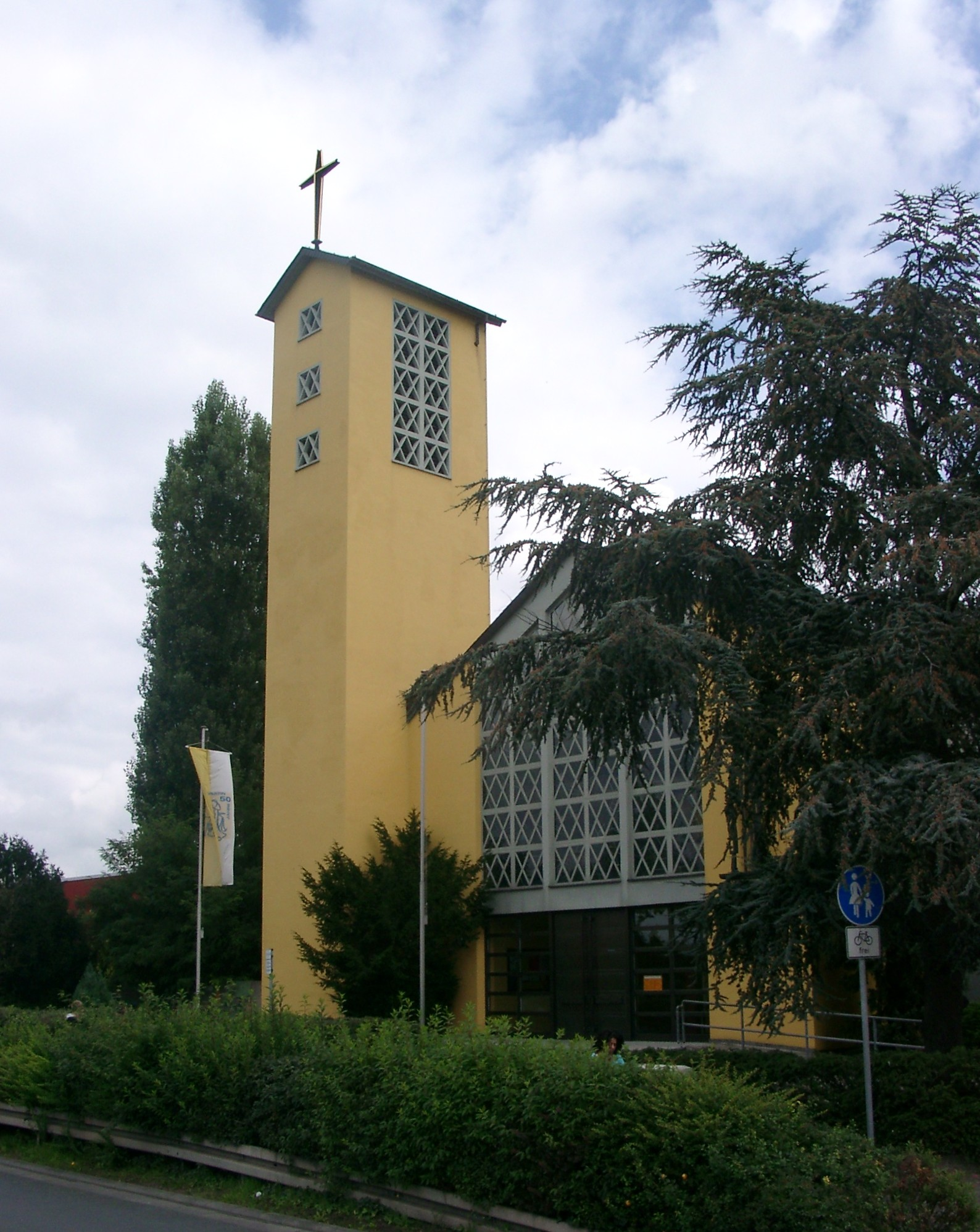
Catholic parish church of St. Martin

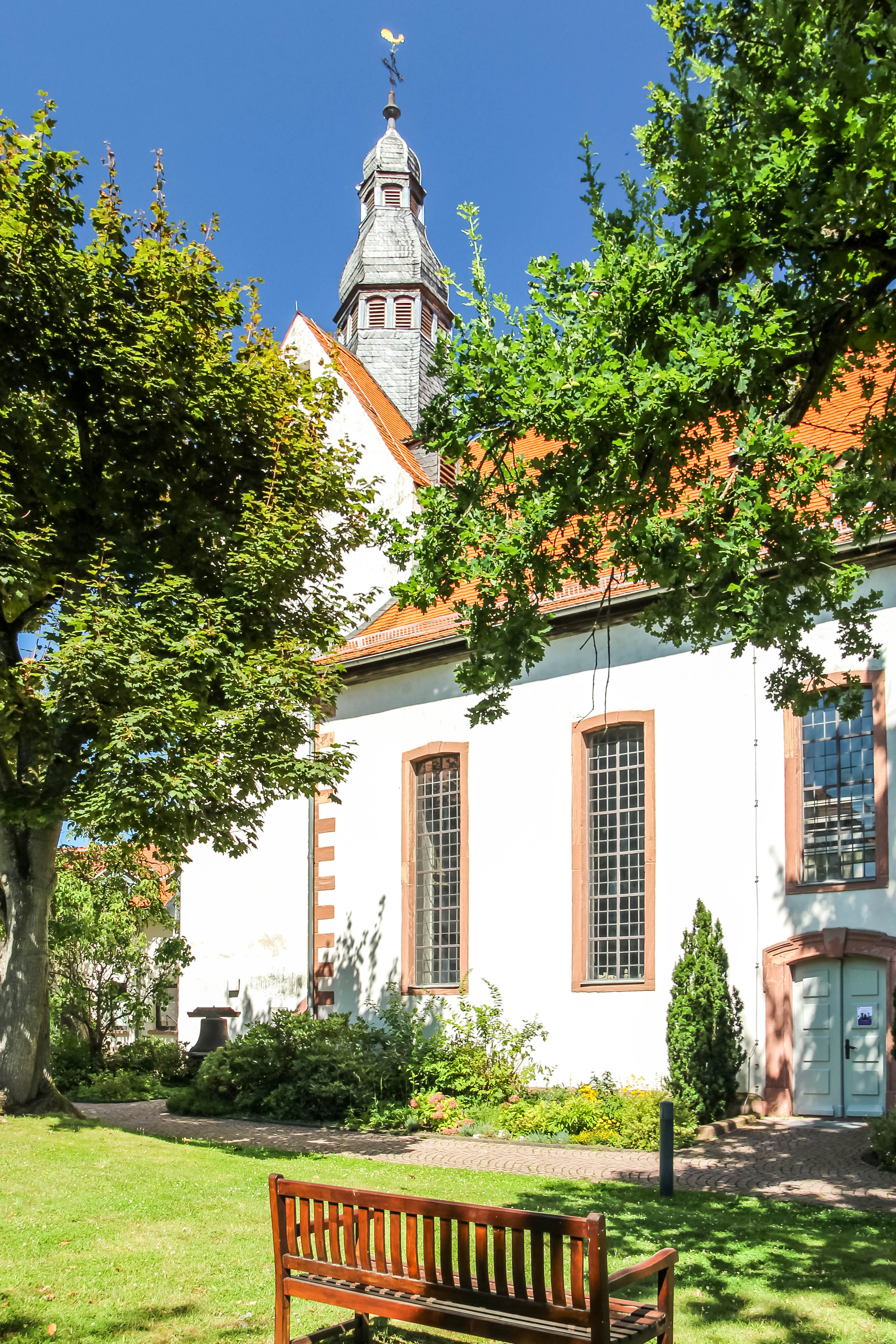
Evangelical Christuskirche
- Free and Independent Life in Love
- Jehovah's Witnesses in Germany, K.d.ö.R.
- DitiB Fatih Moschee e. V. (Turkish mosque)
- Tawhid Mosche e.V. (Moroccan mosque)
- Baitul Hadi (House of Leading to the Right Way, Ahmadiyya Muslim Jamaat Deutschland e.V.)

=== Sport clubs ===
- SG Dietzenbach (longtime team handball Bundesliga participant)
- TG Dietzenbach (on the Wingertsberg: gymnastics, dancing, fitness, tennis, association football, team handball)
- SC Steinberg
- FC Dietzenbach 1971 e.V

=== Radio station ===
Dietzenbach features an own radio station called "Radio Dietzenbach" with a 24/7 service.

== Notable people ==
- Cornelia Hanisch (born 1952), Olympic fencing champion
- Monika Staab (born 1959), football player and coach
- Götz Otto (born 1967), actor

== Twin towns – sister cities ==
Dietzenbach is twinned with:

- Vélizy-Villacoublay, France (1976)
- Masaya, Nicaragua (1985)
- Rakovník, Czech Republic (1986)
- Neuhaus am Rennweg, Germany (1990)
- Oconomowoc, Wisconsin, United States (2008)
- Kastsyukovichy, Belarus (2009)
- Kunming, China (2020)
