= Offenbach (district) =

Coordinates: 50°01′06″N 8°47′08″E

- District
- Flag Coat of arms
- Country: Germany
- State: Hesse
- Adm. region: Darmstadt
- Capital: Dietzenbach

Government
  - District admin.: Oliver Quilling (CDU)

Area
  - Total: 356.29 km^{2} (137.56 sq mi)

Population (31 December 2024)
  - Total: 358,022
  - Density: 1,004.9/km^{2} (2,602.6/sq mi)
- Time zone: UTC+01:00 (CET)
  - Summer (DST): UTC+02:00 (CEST)
- Vehicle registration: OF
- Website: www.kreis-offenbach.de

Offenbach is a Kreis (district) in the south of Hesse, Germany and is part of the Frankfurt/Rhine-Main Metropolitan Region. Neighbouring districts are Main-Kinzig, Aschaffenburg, Darmstadt-Dieburg, Groß-Gerau and the cities of Darmstadt, Frankfurt and Offenbach.

== History ==
The district Offenbach was first formed in 1832 when the previous Landratsbezirke Langen (partially), Seligenstadt and Offenbach were merged. In 1852 the district area was enlarged in a westerly direction, while some of the southern part was moved into the district of Dieburg. In 1938 the area of the Frankfurt airport was added to the district, and the city Offenbach left the district to become a district-free city. However, the seat of administration stayed in Offenbach.

After two minor changes in 1942 and 1974, in 1977 the district was given its current borders, and also the municipalities in the district were merged into 13 municipalities, of which 10 are towns. In 2002, the seat of the district was moved from Offenbach to Dietzenbach.

== Geography ==
A large part of this very urbanised district is wooded. Most towns are part of the Frankfurt urban area. The river Main is a part of the northern border of the district.

== Economy ==
In 2015 (latest data available) the GDP per inhabitant was €38,469. This places the district 8th out of 26 districts (rural and urban) in Hesse(overall average: €42,732).

== Coat of arms ==
The oak tree in the coat of arms symbolize the formerly big oak forests of Dreieich (three oaks). The escutcheon in the middle shows a combination of the coat of arms of the Counts of Isenburg in the left and the Wheel of Mainz in the right, as the districts area belonged to these two counties in the past.

== Towns and municipalities ==
Clickable map of towns and municipalities in the district

Towns
1. Dietzenbach
2. Dreieich
3. Heusenstamm
4. Langen
5. Mühlheim am Main
6. Neu-Isenburg

7. Obertshausen
8. Rodgau
9. Rödermark
10. Seligenstadt
Municipalities
1. Egelsbach
2. Hainburg
3. Mainhausen
