= Frankfurter Kreuz =

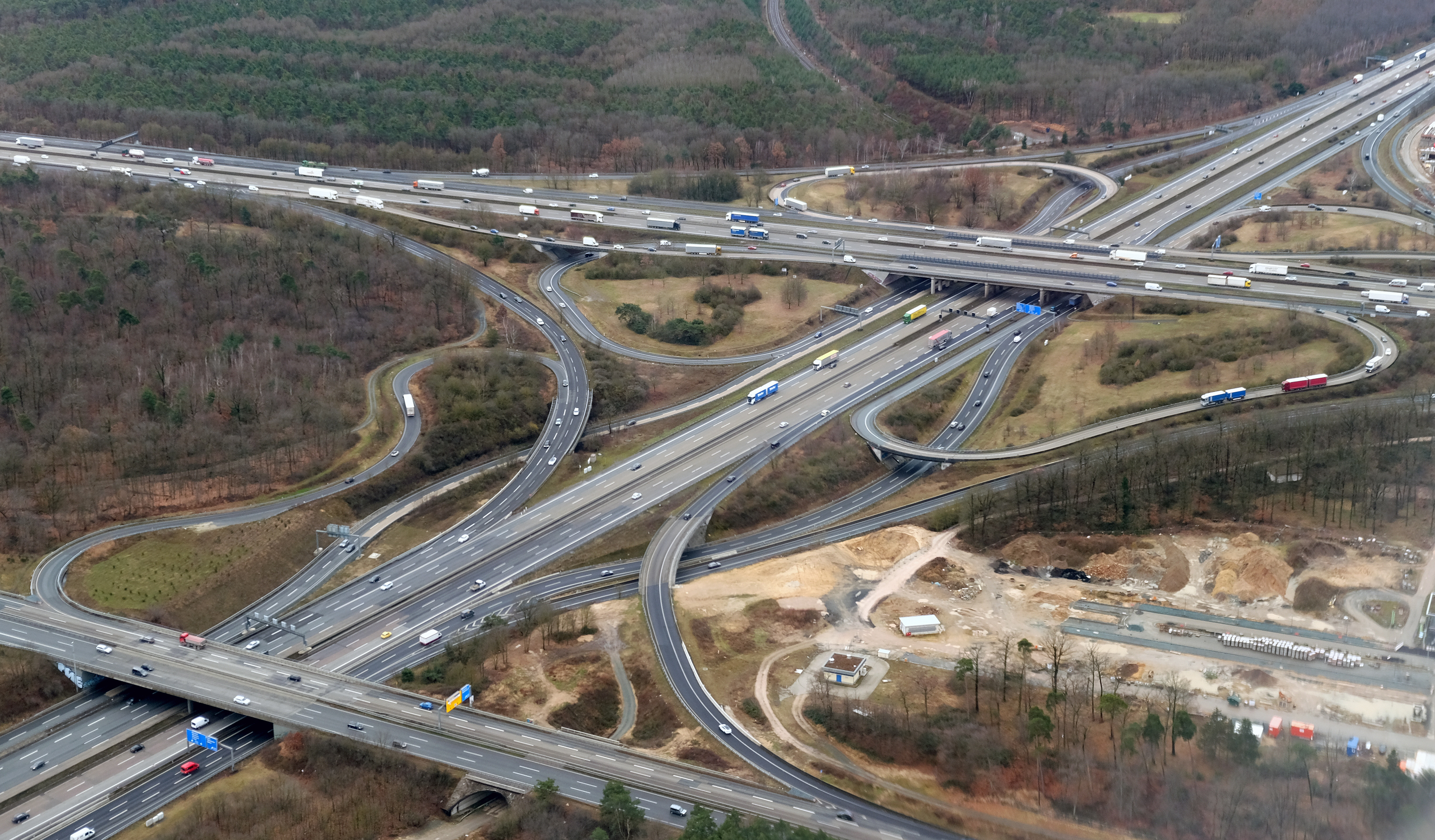
- Interactive map of Frankfurter Kreuz

Location
- Frankfurt am Main, Germany
- Coordinates: 50°03′11″N 8°36′15″E
- Roads at junction: A 3; A 5; B 43

Construction
- Opened: 10 July 1956

The Frankfurter Kreuz (Frankfurt Junction) is an Autobahn interchange in Frankfurt am Main, Germany, where the autobahns A3 and A5 meet. The interchange was originally to be built from 1931 to 1933, but due to World War II construction was not finished until 1957.

It underwent massive remodeling in the 1990s, as it had been frequently overloaded due to excess traffic. Today, both autobahns have ten lanes.

== Overview ==
Two tunnels of the Cologne–Frankfurt high-speed rail line have been put below the Kreuz. The Kreuz is situated at the northeastern corner of Frankfurt Airport.

Along with the airport and the airport's long-distance railway station, the Frankfurter Kreuz is commonly seen as a symbol of Frankfurt's good connections to the world.

With approximately 320,000 cars daily, it is the most heavily used interchange in the European Union.

== Images ==
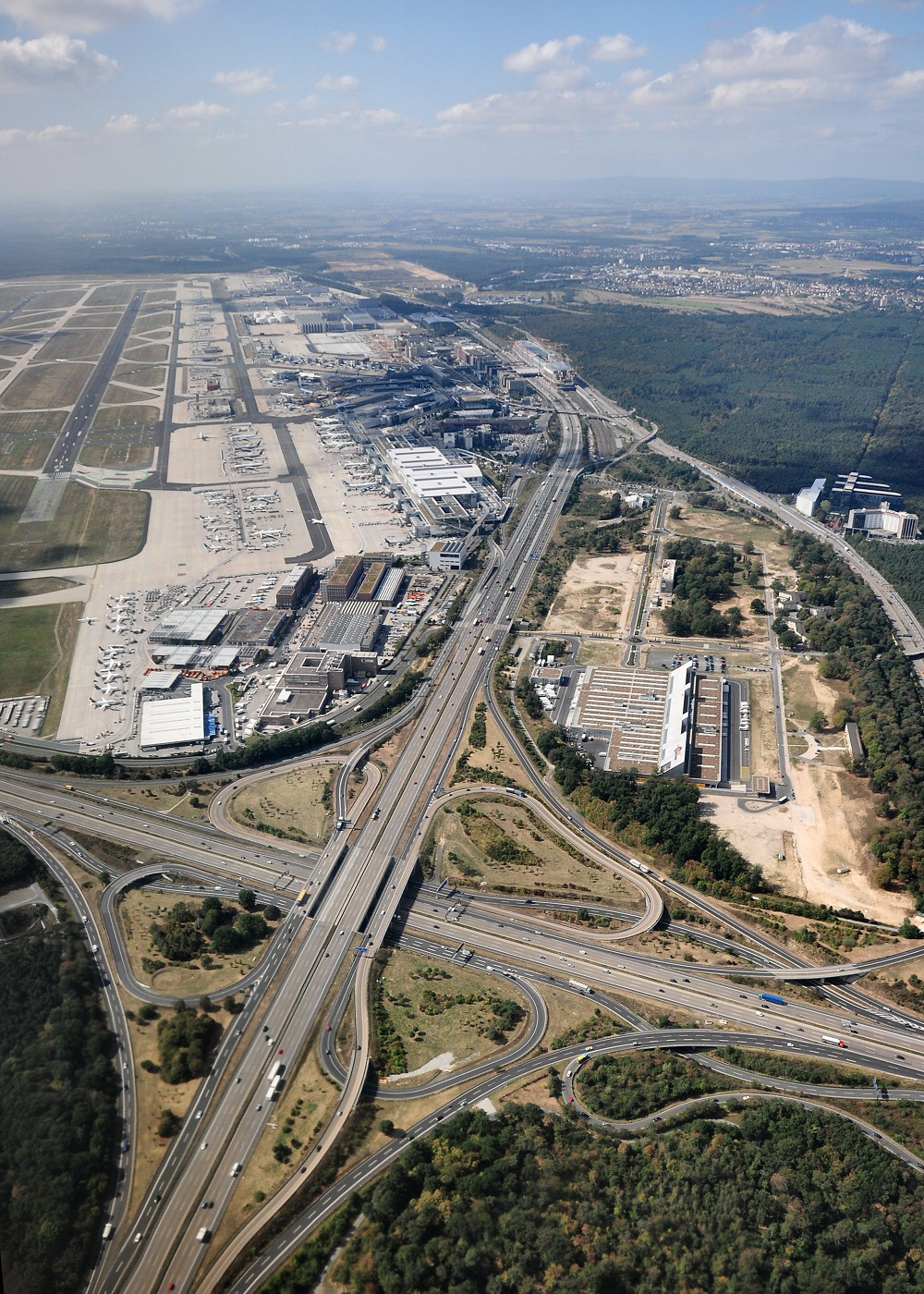
Frankfurter Kreuz intersection between autobahn A3 and A5 seen from a Lufthansa B737

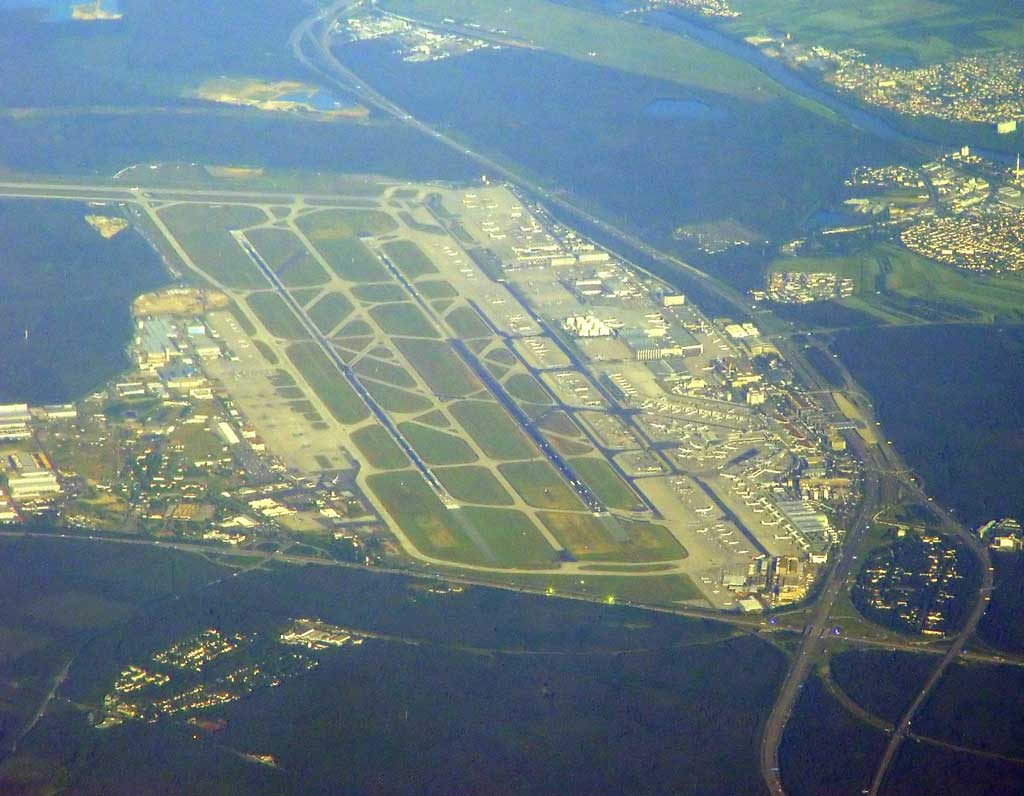
Aerial view, A3 vertically, A5 horizontally

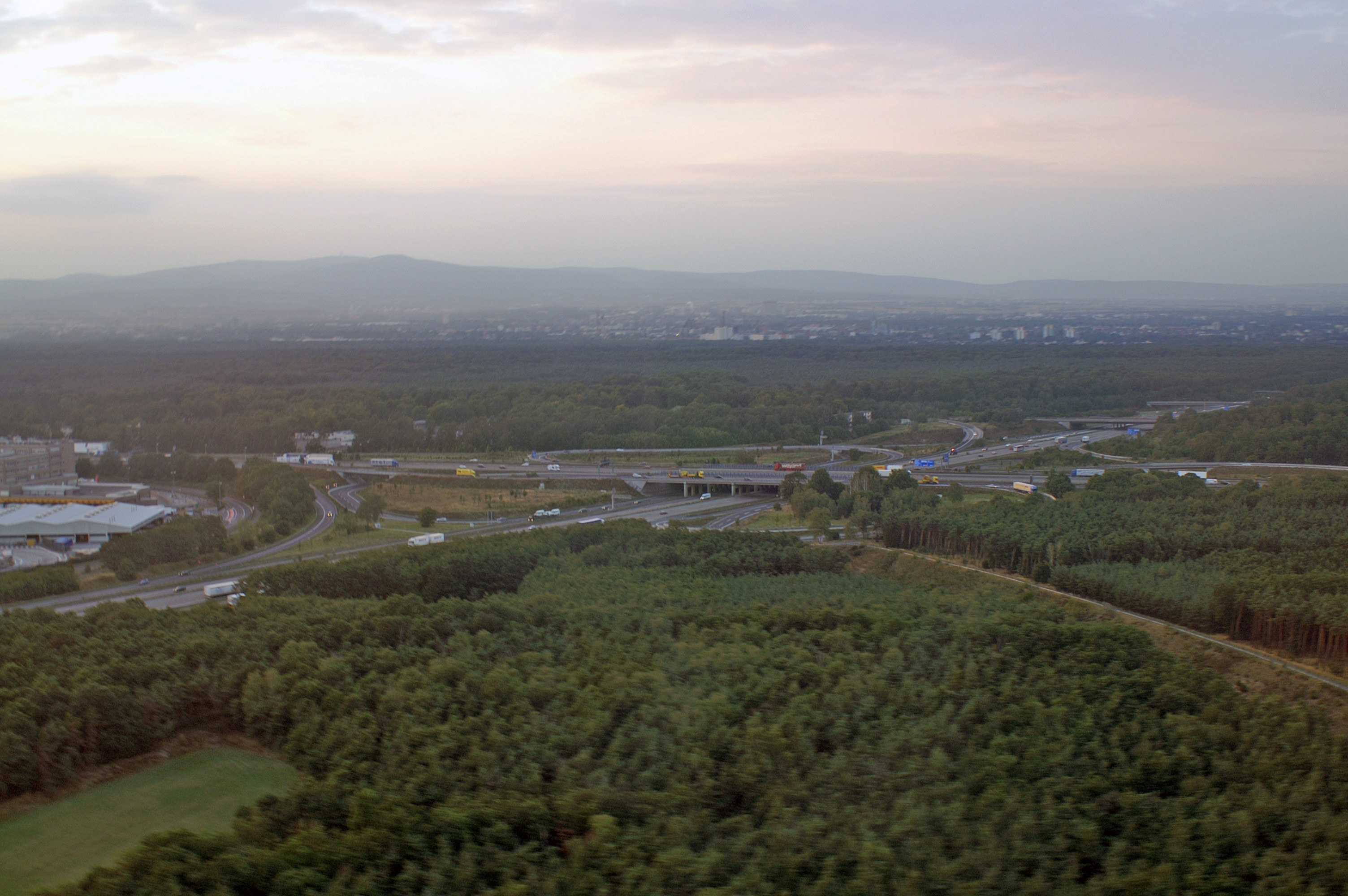
A5 vertically, A3 horizontally

== See also ==
- Frankfurt City Tunnel
