= Riegenroth =

- Municipality
- Coat of arms

- Location of Riegenroth within Rhein-Hunsrück-Kreis district
- Interactive map of Riegenroth
- Location within Germany Location within Rhineland-Palatinate
- Coordinates: 50°3′29″N 7°34′52″E
- Country: Germany
- State: Rhineland-Palatinate
- District: Rhein-Hunsrück-Kreis
- Municipal assoc.: Simmern-Rheinböllen

Government
  - Mayor (2019–24): Ben Kunz

Area
  - Total: 3.14 km^{2} (1.21 sq mi)
- Elevation: 440 m (1,440 ft)

Population (2025-12-31)
  - Total: 239
  - Density: 76.1/km^{2} (197/sq mi)
- Time zone: UTC+01:00 (CET)
  - Summer (DST): UTC+02:00 (CEST)
- Postal codes: 55469
- Dialling codes: 06766
- Vehicle registration: SIM
- Website: www.riegenroth.de

Riegenroth is an Ortsgemeinde – a municipality belonging to a Verbandsgemeinde, a kind of collective municipality – in the Rhein-Hunsrück-Kreis (district) in Rhineland-Palatinate, Germany. It belongs to the Verbandsgemeinde Simmern-Rheinböllen, whose seat is in Simmern. Riegenroth is a recognized recreational resort (Erholungsort).

== Geography ==
=== Location ===
The municipality lies in the Hunsrück roughly 9 km northeast of Simmern and 8 km northwest of Rheinböllen, above the Grundbach just upstream from where it empties into the Simmerbach near Kisselbach. The rural residential community is linked by municipal roads to the neighbouring municipalities of Bubach, Laudert, Kisselbach and Budenbach.

=== Land use ===
The municipal area measures 3.14 km^{2}, with uses divided among agriculture (47.9%), woodlands (42.8%), open water (0.5%), dwelling and transport (8.5%) and others (0.2%).

== History ==
The village is known in the Riegenroth Moselle Franconian variety of speech as Riescherd. The name points to Riegenroth having been “Rudich’s Clearing”, founded sometime in the Middle Ages. In 1275, Riegenroth had a documentary mention as Rudichenrode in a document in which the Knight of Milwalt was awarded the tithes, and it was also mentioned in a 1245 document from the Saint Martin of (Ober-)Wesel Foundation. The name was soon corrupted to Riescherd. Beginning in 1794, Riegenroth lay under French rule. In 1814 it was assigned to the Kingdom of Prussia at the Congress of Vienna. Since 1946, it has been part of the then newly founded state of Rhineland-Palatinate.

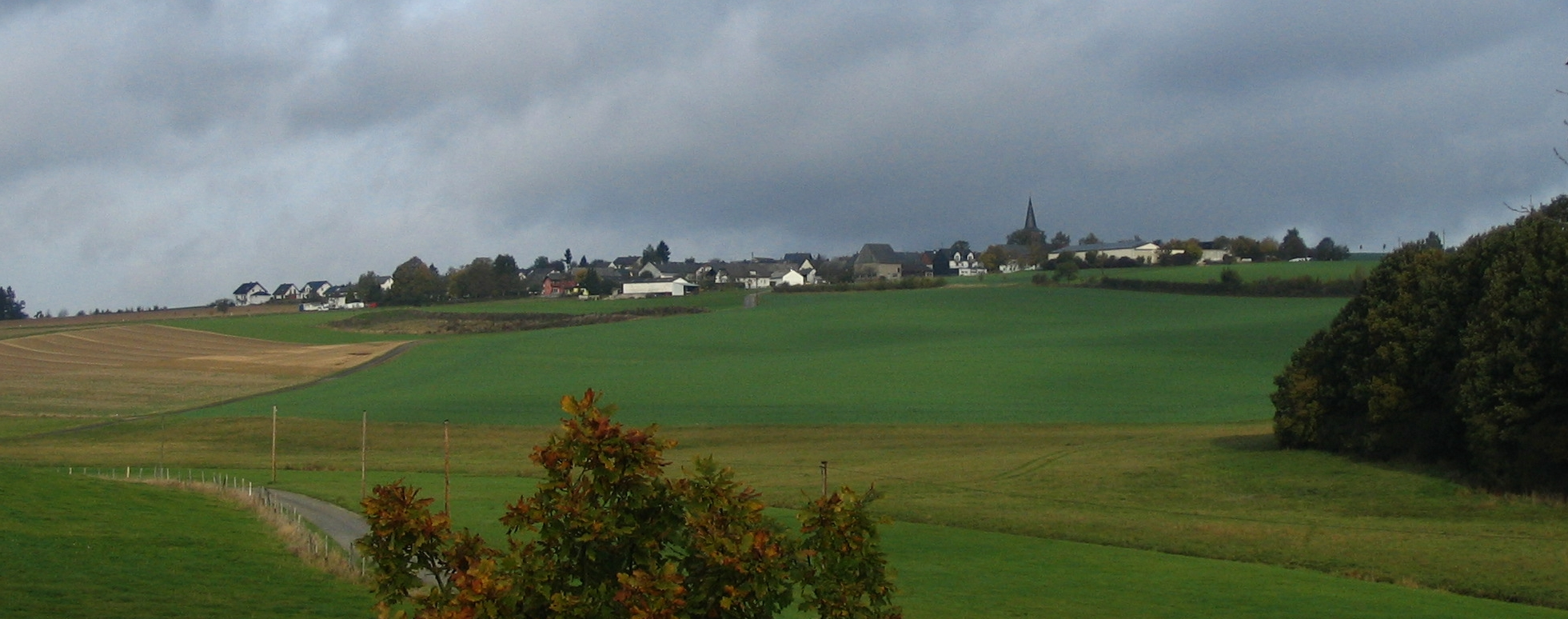
Riegenroth seen from the southeast

Ecclesiastically, the village belonged to Schönenberg (or Sconenberg, a now vanished village) between Riegenroth and Kisselbach, for which a nobleman of the House of Schönburg from Castle Schönburg near Oberwesel endowed a chapel, assigned to the deaconry of Boppard. Even when the chapel was raised to parish church in 1275, it still belonged to that deaconry. Later, when Kisselbach had its own church, it was for a time after the Reformation used by both Catholics and Protestants in a simultaneum. Later, after the Declaration of 1707, the Evangelicals were supposed to be awarded the church in Kisselbach, which lay “on this side of the Simmerbach” on Evangelical Electoral-Palatine territory. However, there were very few houses there. So, the Kisselbach villagers, who were Electoral-Trier subjects, and therefore Catholics, took issue with this proposal. Only in 1787 did Riegenroth get its own Evangelical church. Since then, there has been the parish of Riegenroth with Kisselbach, Steinbach and Laudert. Until 1999, this was parochially bound to the parish of Pleizenhausen, to which belong, besides the main centre, also Bergenhausen and Rayerschied. The rectory stood in Pleizenhausen. Since 1999, the parish of Riegenroth has been tied to the parish of Horn-Laubach-Bubach and has belonged to the Evangelical Church district of Simmern-Trarbach.

There are only a few Catholics in the municipality.

== Politics ==
=== Municipal council ===
The council is made up of 6 council members, who were elected by majority vote at the municipal election held on 7 June 2009, and the honorary mayor as chairman.

=== Mayor ===
Riegenroth’s mayor is Ben Kunz.

=== Coat of arms ===
The German blazon reads: In der schwarzen Schildfläche zwischen zwei gekreuzten goldenen Palmwedeln ein nach rechts schreitender aufrechter goldener Löwe, rotbezungt und -bewehrt.

The municipality’s arms might in English heraldic language be described thus: Sable between two palm leaves palewise, the stems in base per saltire Or a lion rampant of the same armed and langued gules.

The village and court of Riegenroth were sold in the early 15th century by the Knights of Schönberg at the Castle at Wesel to the Counts Palatine of the Rhine. The gold lion on the black field refers to the landholders, the Dukes of Palatinate-Simmern and the Electors Palatine.

The charges – the lion and the palm leaves – are drawn unaltered from the old 1720 court seal.

== Culture and sightseeing ==
=== Buildings ===
The following are listed buildings or sites in Rhineland-Palatinate’s Directory of Cultural Monuments:

- Evangelical church, Bubacher Straße – Baroque aisleless church, marked 1787, tower 1865; whole complex of buildings with graveyard
- Former Schönenberg graveyard, south of Riegenroth – sandstone cross, marked 1777

== Economy and infrastructure ==
The Autobahn A 61 can be reached through the Laudert interchange, 5 km away. The Rhine can be reached over the Rheingoldstraße, a road from Simmern to Oberwesel passing through Kisselbach, from which the journey is 15 km. Not much farther away are Kastellaun, which lies on Bundesstraße 327 and the Hunsrückhöhenstraße (“Hunsrück Heights Road”, a scenic road across the Hunsrück built originally as a military road on Hermann Göring’s orders), and Simmern, through which runs Bundesstraße 50, where there are indoor and outdoor swimming pools along with shopping and entertainment facilities.
