= Bundesautobahn 571 =

Federal motorway in Germany

A 571
- Bundesautobahn 571

Route information
- Length: 2.4 km (1.5 mi)

Major junctions
- North end: Ehlingen
- B 266
- South end: Sinzig

Location
- Country: Germany
- States: Rhineland-Palatinate

Highway system
- Roads in Germany; Autobahns; List; Federal; List; State; E-roads

Bundesautobahn 571 (translates from German as Federal Motorway 571, short form Autobahn 571, abbreviated as BAB 571 or A 571) is an autobahn in Germany.

The A 571 is one of the shortest autobahns in Germany, measuring 2.4 km. The autobahn is located entirely in a rural area east of Bad Neuenahr-Ahrweiler. The A 571's southern end is located at the three-way interchange Sinzig with the A 61.

The original plan of the A 571 was to link a much longer A 31, which was to end in Bad Neuenahr-Ahrweiler, at the A 61. However, the A 31 was cancelled south of Mülheim an der Ruhr due to community opposition, but not before a few vestiges of the project were left behind. The A 571's northern end is merely a ninety-degree curve back to the west, after which the road becomes a branch of the B 266, which continues into Bad Neuenahr-Ahrweiler as a grade-separated Kraftfahrstraße (expressway). The other vestiges are the easternmost section of the A 560 and all of the A 573. This was to be the location of a three-way interchange with the cancelled A 31. Construction began in March 2009 on a project to extend the B 266 expressway across Bad Neuenahr-Ahrweiler and connect the A 571 to the A 573. The current northern terminus of the A 571 will become a three-way interchange with an upgraded B 266, according to current plans. Construction is estimated to finish by 2015.

== Exit list ==
Legend:

- I/C - Interchange, I/S - Intersection, RSA - Rest and service area, OBR - Overhead bridge restaurant, R/R - Restaurant and rest plaza, L/B - Layby, V/P - Vista point, TN - tunnel, T/P - Toll plaza, BR - Bridge
- C - Cloverleaf, S - Stack, T-A - Trumpet-A, T-B - Trumpet-B, DT - Directional-T/Y, SDT - Semi-Directional-T/Y, P-Y - Partial-Y, D - Diamond, P-C - Partial cloverleaf, D-D - Diverging diamond, D-R - Direct ramp

Location	km	mi	Exit	Name	Destinations	Notes
To be updated				Bad Bodendorf I/S	B 266	Planned
To be updated				Ehlingen		Southbound
To be updated			Hochstraße Bridge (140 – m)			
To be updated				Löhndorf		Northbound
To be updated				Sinzig	A 61 / E31	3-way interchange
1.000 mi = 1.609 km; 1.000 km = 0.621 mi: Proposed
