= Bubach =

- Municipality
- Location of Bubach within Rhein-Hunsrück-Kreis district
- Interactive map of Bubach
- Location within Germany Location within Rhineland-Palatinate
- Coordinates: 50°4′20″N 7°33′30″E
- Country: Germany
- State: Rhineland-Palatinate
- District: Rhein-Hunsrück-Kreis
- Municipal assoc.: Simmern-Rheinböllen

Government
  - Mayor (2019–24): Elke Härter

Area
  - Total: 7.1 km^{2} (2.7 sq mi)
- Elevation: 450 m (1,480 ft)

Population (2025-12-31)
  - Total: 237
  - Density: 33/km^{2} (86/sq mi)
- Time zone: UTC+01:00 (CET)
  - Summer (DST): UTC+02:00 (CEST)
- Postal codes: 56288
- Dialling codes: 06766
- Vehicle registration: SIM

Bubach (German pronunciation: [ˈbuːbax]) is an Ortsgemeinde – a municipality belonging to a Verbandsgemeinde, a kind of collective municipality – in the Rhein-Hunsrück-Kreis (district) in Rhineland-Palatinate, Germany. It belongs to the Verbandsgemeinde Simmern-Rheinböllen, whose seat is in Simmern.

== Geography ==
=== Location ===
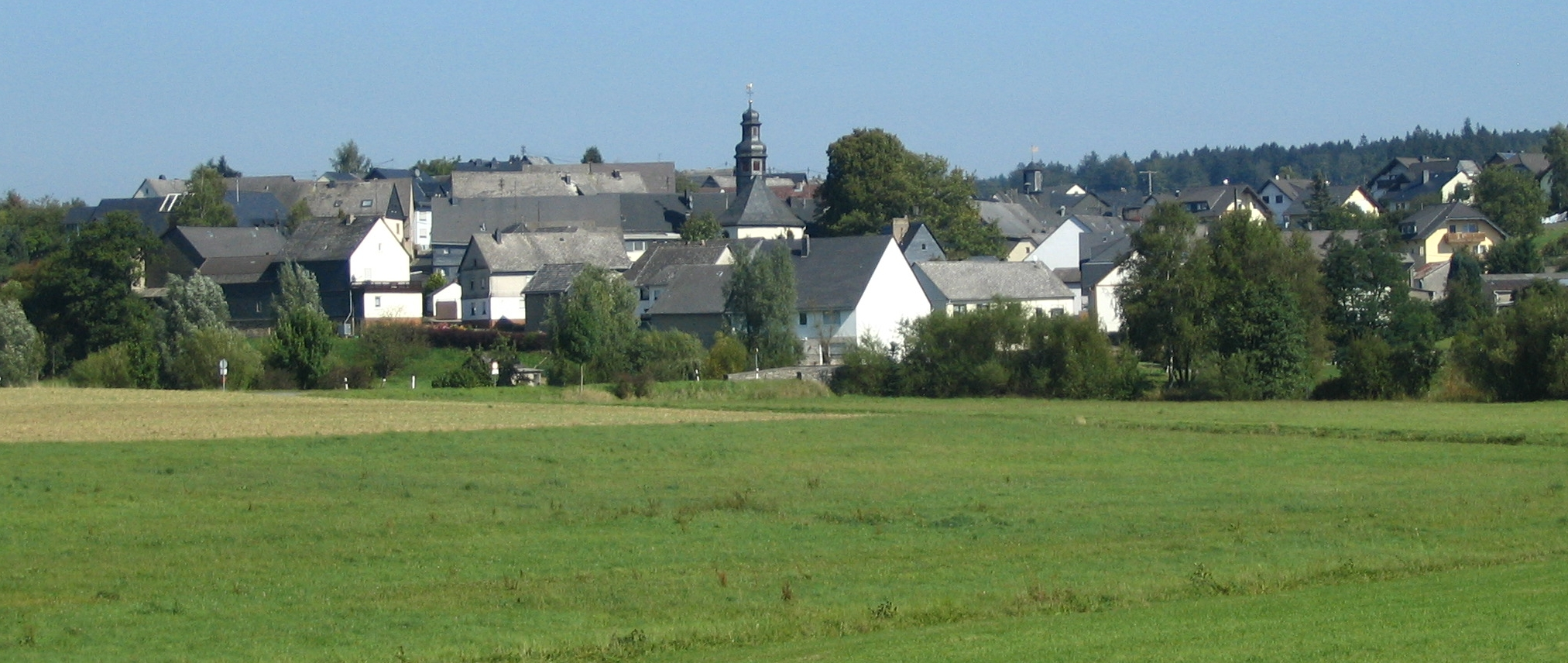
Bubach seen from the south

The municipality lies in the Hunsrück on a long, low ridge between two brooks, the one known as the Bubacher Bach or the Grundbach, and the other called the Maisborner Bach or the Flößchen, which farther downstream from Bubach flow together. A third brook coming from Laubach and the Bubacher Burg, a nowadays only vaguely discernible mediaeval motte-and-bailey castle in a boggy area, makes the brook so strong that it once drove a mill that stood about a kilometre from the village. Bubach is mainly formed of two streets, the Vorderdorf (“Fore-Village”) running to the southwest, and the Hinterdorf (“Hind-Village”).

== History ==
=== Early times ===
The village's name is derived from Buochbach, which suggests that it was founded, or at least named, in the era of Frankish settlement in the 6th to 8th century. Its favourable location on a dry spur of land between two brooks, too, gives a clue as to Bubach's early founding. In 1940, a stone axe was unearthed within municipal limits, hinting at beginnings of a human presence in the area by the New Stone Age. The axe is now in the Hunsrückmuseum in Simmern.

=== Middle Ages ===
On 10 July 1002, Bubach had its first documentary mention in a document from King, later Emperor, Heinrich II through which he donated six Königshufen (“Royal Hufen, a Hufe being an old land measurement) from his holdings to a knight named Gezo from the Nahegau. On 13 June 1302, in Bubach and other places, Imperial goods and rights were pledged to the Counts of Sponheim for 500 Cologne marks by King Albrecht. The Laubach court of Schöffen (roughly “lay jurists”) with Bubach belonged beginning in the mid 14th century to Electoral Palatinate. In 1410, the village passed, along with the surrounding area, to the newly created Duchy of Palatinate-Simmern. In 1498, Bubach had 79 adult inhabitants (and therefore roughly 200 all together). In 1599 there were 16 hearths (or households). After the Thirty Years' War, only five men heading families were still capable of paying taxes (1656 estimate). In 1698, two generations later, there were only 44 inhabitants.

=== Early modern times ===
Between 1767 and 1894, twenty-nine Bubachers emigrated, mostly to Brazil. Beginning in 1794, Bubach lay under French rule. In 1809, Bubach had 209 inhabitants, and 270 in 1840. In 1814 Bubach was assigned to the Kingdom of Prussia at the Congress of Vienna. Since 1947, it has been part of the then newly founded state of Rhineland-Palatinate.

The first church in the village was a chapel consecrated to Saint Philip and Saint James, which was named in connection with a prayer procession approved by Archbishop of Trier Johann, but whose location is now unknown. The Reformation was introduced into Electoral Palatinate in 1557, but in 1626, many Protestant clergymen were driven out in the Counterreformation. Only in the 1706 Electoral-Palatine division of churches were clear relations forged and churches shared out. Bubach remained along with Horn and Riegenroth Evangelical. The Catholics went to church in Laubach, although they did have their own corner in the graveyard around the church. Work on the church that still stands now was begun in 1764 after the older building had to be torn down owing to its state of disrepair. On 16 June 1765, the new church was consecrated.

=== 19th century ===
In 1852, the church acquired an organ for 700 Thaler. It came from the Stumm workshop. In 1844, the Große Brücke (“Great Bridge”) downstream from Bubach was built at the municipality's expense. The likewise stone bridge upstream from Bubach at Lingerhahn was built in 1850. A new graveyard was laid out on Riegenrother Weg in 1873. In 1826, the first schoolhouse was built, which stood, as the last school in the village later did, at the way into the “Fore-Village”. Before this school was built, any schooling had taken place in private homes. The building was financed by the Evangelicals; Catholics went to school in Laubach. The newer building that went up in 1910 was, like the old one, a one-room schoolhouse, but it also had ample teacher's quarters, and in the school cellar was a warmwater bathtub facility. This school was also only for Evangelical children, but this ended in 1937 with the enactment of a law decreeing unified schools. After the Second World War, the now somewhat run-down schoolhouse underwent repairs. From 1956 until it was closed in 1971, the building was once again used as a non-denominational school. It is now used as a private house.

In 1887, a postal agency was set up in the Ries Inn (Gasthof Ries, built in 1871). It lasted until 1975. In 1903, a public telephone was installed there.

=== Early 20th century and world wars ===
Between 1900 and 1908, the Hunsrückbahn (railway) was built; the local stop was at Dudenroth. Waterworks came in 1905 and 1906, harnessing water from springs higher up than the village, so that pumping was not needed. In 1922, electricity came to Bubach.

In the First World War, 14 men from Bubach fell. Many men became soldiers and were missing from the village in the war years, even the forester and the schoolteacher. The latter came home badly injured and with a permanently lamed hand, but he could still do his teaching job and even serve as the organist.

In 1933, the village managed to build a swimming pool on the Bubacher Bach upstream from Bubach. The first, and at the time, only, swimmer was the schoolteacher's son and theology student, Herrmann Michel. The swimming pool has since been downgraded to fishpond.

The toll on the municipality in the Second World War was greater than it had been in the Great War. Twenty-five names had to be added to the 14 already on the local memorial at the church. In the First World War, there had been some 29 Russian prisoners of war on the village's farms. By 1941, 14 Frenchmen, 6 Poles and 12 Soviets were being used as forced labourers locally. When the Americans marched in on 18 March 1945, there was no damage, apart from the sign at the entrance to the Adolf Hitler Bad (and US troops would have understood this sign to mean something other than a pool named after the Führer), which was torn down and taken away as a war trophy.

=== Postwar era ===
Between 1954 and 1956, a community centre was built on the site of the old bakehouse. In 1955, television came to Bubach with the first set being seen at the Ries Inn. From 1955 to 1976, there was a general store in the village. In 1961, land for weekender houses was opened up; by 1975, it was fully built up. Also in 1961, there were already five combine harvesters on the local farms. In the same year, a census yielded a population figure of 269, as well as the following statistics: 56 buildings; 55 households; 6 workplaces (1 smithy, 1 shop, 1 inn with overnight accommodations, a postal agency and three farmers who had employees). The Cologne geographer Reinhard Zschocke further wrote that the greater part of the agricultural businesses that were still going concerns (still 37 in 1964, one third having been given up) were full-time businesses, although most of these were being run by the grandparents’ generation, some of whom also worked seasonally as forest workers. Employment opportunities also existed in roadbuilding as well as at sawmills in Maisborn. The number of businesses working at sidelines or after hours was quite low. By 1967, the number of operations had already shrunk to 30. Today, there are only a very few agricultural businesses. Beginning in 1980, 21 purely residential houses were being built in the cadastral area called im Obergarten. The younger generation wanted an up-to-date style of living. Nevertheless, the village's population did not rise appreciably. Another new housing estate was built up from the graveyard in 2000. The old village, too, was also brought into line with modernity with conversions and new buildings.

In the course of administrative restructuring in Rhineland-Palatinate, Bubach, of its own free will (in a decision taken on 4 December 1969), joined the Verbandsgemeinde of Simmern, and not the Verbandsgemeinde of Kastellaun.

In more recent times, a comfortable cabin with barbecue pits has been built at the Baumstück by the Maisborner Wald (forest).

=== Religion ===
Bubach is parochially tied to Horn. Until 1945, Catholics were only a small minority in the municipality.

In 1965, the denominational breakdown was as follows: 209 Protestants and 88 Catholics. Since then, the figures have not changed appreciably.

== Politics ==
=== Municipal council ===
The council is made up of 6 council members, who were elected by majority vote at the municipal election held on 7 June 2009, and the honorary mayor as chairwoman.

=== Mayor ===
Bubach's mayor is Elke Härter.

== Culture and sightseeing ==
=== Buildings ===
The following are listed buildings or sites in Rhineland-Palatinate’s Directory of Cultural Monuments:

- Evangelical church, Hauptstraße 6 – Baroque aisleless church, 1764/1765
- Former defensive complex southwest of the village between Bubach and Laubach

The “defensive complex” southwest of Bubach is all that remains of a mediaeval motte-and-bailey castle. Anything more historically precise than that about this place is unknown. It is, however, a nearly square castle hill measuring roughly 30 × 30 m girded by a round wall.

=== Local speech ===
An example of Bubach's local dialect shows the reader some differences between it and Standard High German:

Bubach speech:

“Wäste wohl, wo Bobach leit? Bobach leit im Grund, wo die beese Bue sin, stinke wie die Hunn. Wo die scheene Mädche sin, glänze wie die Sun!”

Standard German:

“Weist du wo Bubach liegt? Bubach liegt im Grund, dort wo die bösen Buben sind, stinken wie die Hunde. Wo die schönen Mädchen sind, glänzen wie die Sonne!”

English translation:

“Do you know where Bubach lies? Bubach lies in the land where the wicked boys are who stink like dogs. Where the lovely girls are who shine like the sun!”
