= Laubach, Rhein-Hunsrück =

Laubach
- Municipality
- Coat of arms

- Location of Laubach within Rhein-Hunsrück-Kreis district
- Interactive map of Laubach
- Location within Germany Location within Rhineland-Palatinate
- Coordinates: 50°03′20″N 7°30′38″E
- Country: Germany
- State: Rhineland-Palatinate
- District: Rhein-Hunsrück-Kreis
- Municipal assoc.: Simmern-Rheinböllen

Government
  - Mayor (2019–24): Karl Heinz Bohn

Area
  - Total: 10.02 km^{2} (3.87 sq mi)
- Elevation: 405–480 m (1,329–1,575 ft)

Population (2025-12-31)
  - Total: 448
  - Density: 44.7/km^{2} (116/sq mi)
- Time zone: UTC+01:00 (CET)
  - Summer (DST): UTC+02:00 (CEST)
- Postal codes: 56288
- Dialling codes: 06762
- Vehicle registration: SIM
- Website: www.laubach-hunsrueck.de

Laubach (German pronunciation: [ˈlaʊbax]) is an Ortsgemeinde – a municipality belonging to a Verbandsgemeinde, a kind of collective municipality – in the Rhein-Hunsrück-Kreis (district) in Rhineland-Palatinate, Germany. It belongs to the Verbandsgemeinde Simmern-Rheinböllen, whose seat is in Simmern.

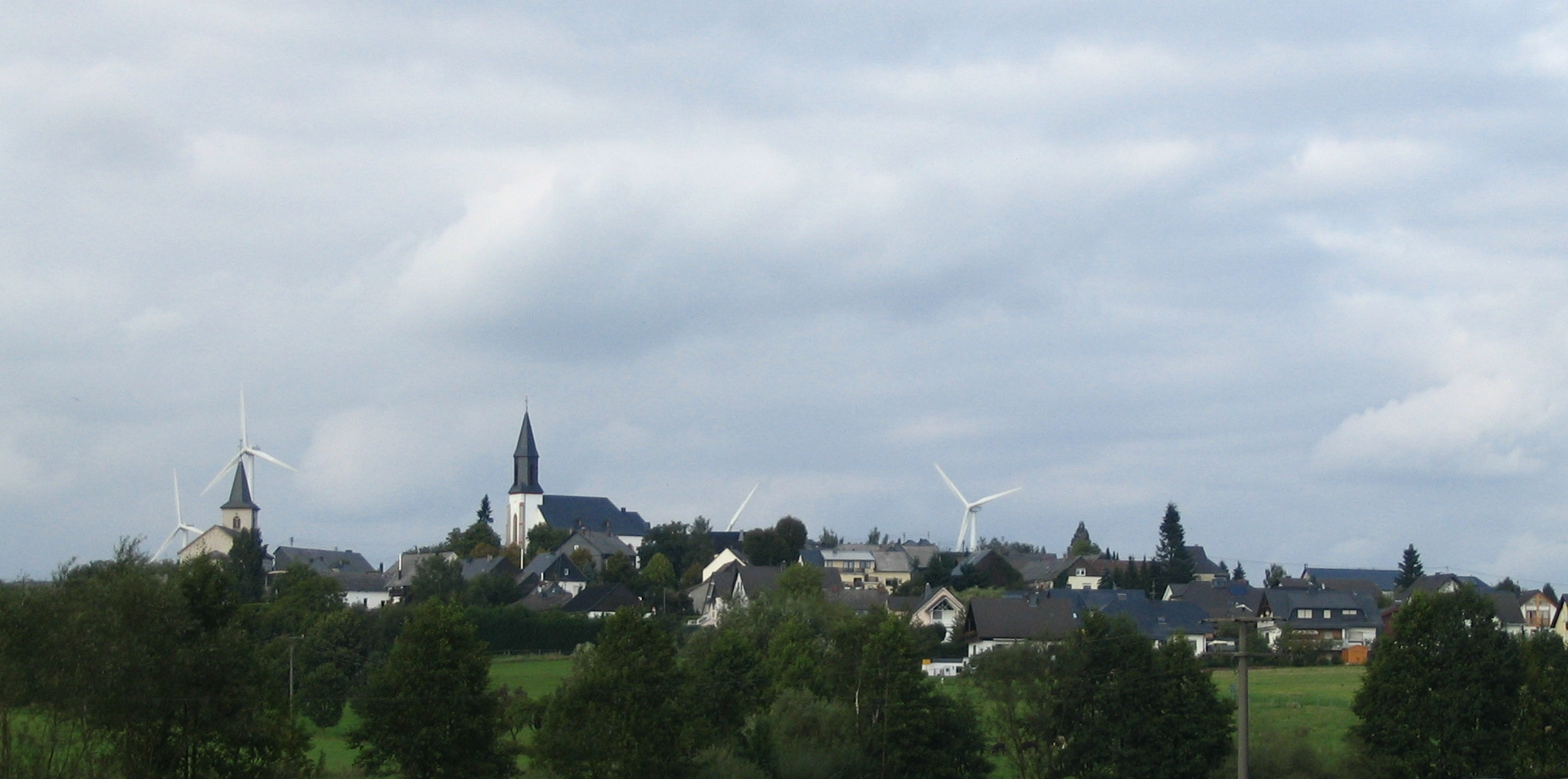
Laubach seen from the west

== Geography ==
=== Location ===
Laubach lies in the central Hunsrück between Simmern and Kastellaun. It lies roughly centrally within its municipal area, sloping down gently towards the Külzbach valley. The municipal area measures 1 002 ha, 502 ha of which is municipal forest. Laubach's highest point is 480 m above sea level, and its lowest 405 m above sea level.

== History ==
In 1103, Laubach had its first documentary mention. A lordly estate named Lupach belonged as of that year to the Ravengiersburg Monastery as the result of an exchange deal with Provost Amselm of Saint Stephen's in Mainz. In 1135, the widow of Burkhard von Honrein (that is, the neighbouring village now known as Horn) transferred her estate in Horn, Laubach and other places “together with the right to assist in filling the pastoral post at the church in Horn to the Ravengiersburg Monastery”.

As to Laubach's ecclesiastical history, a chapel in the village was named for the first time in 1211, and then again in 1217. It belonged to the Archbishopric of Trier. About 1250, one of the Archbishop's directories named various rights, among them a “cathedral tax” that the Archbishop had the right to levy at Loupach in the rural deaconry of Keimta (now Zell). From the early 14th century comes a reference to the Laubacher Gericht (“Laubach Court”), which was made up not only of Laubach, but also of the neighbouring villages of Bubach, Ebschied and Horn along with a part of Budenbach and the now forsaken villages of Heinzert, Scheuf, Steilheim, Allenzhausen, Steinkülz, which clearly must still have been inhabited at this time. In 1302, Laubach and its immediate neighbours, including the ones that have since vanished, were granted Imperial immediacy.

On 13 June 1302, Emperor Albert I pledged the villages, for services to be rendered, to Count Simon of Sponheim, or as he is called in the document, “Simoni comti des Spanheim”, after long, drawn-out warfare in 1300 and 1301. It might have been in the time that followed that the village was fortified. Under whose lordship this happened, however, is unknown. Only in 1360 was Laubach once again mentioned in this regard, when it was noted that the “town on the Hunsrück” should be further fortified (in the Middle Ages, “town” – or Stadt in German – almost always meant a fortified place). The lordship at this time was held by the Count Palatine of the Rhine, on whose orders the fortifications, presumably hitherto a single wall, were expanded with a ringwall.

In 1410, Laubach passed to the newly founded Principality of Simmern (Palatine branch), and in 1673 to the Electorate of the Palatinate. In the Late Middle Ages, the Vesten Laubach des Fürstenthumes Simmern (Laubach Castles of the Principality of Simmern”) lost their importance. The fortifications crumbled bit by bit. In 1772, great pieces of the once oval defences with their moat still stood. The last remnants of the fortifications, though, were swept away in the Flurbereinigung undertaken between 1951 and 1956.

Beginning in 1794, Laubach lay under French rule. In 1815 it was assigned to the Kingdom of Prussia at the Congress of Vienna. Since 1946, it has been part of the then newly founded state of Rhineland-Palatinate.

=== Population development ===
- 1939: 362
- 1970: 412
- 1982: 401
- 31 December 2006: 457
- 31 December 2007: 445

== Politics ==
=== Municipal council ===
The council is made up of 8 council members, who were elected by majority vote at the municipal election held on 7 June 2009, and the honorary mayor as chairman. Until the 2004 election, the council was made up of 12 council members.

=== Mayor ===
Laubach's mayor is Karl Heinz Bohn.

=== Coat of arms ===
The municipality's arms might be described thus: A fess wavy abased argent between sable a lion rampant with tail forked flory Or armed and langued gules and vert an oakleaf fesswise fructed of two of the third.

== Culture and sightseeing ==
=== Buildings ===
The following are listed buildings or sites in Rhineland-Palatinate’s Directory of Cultural Monuments:

- Evangelical church, Kastellauner Straße 10 – Late Classicist aisleless church, Romanesque Revival motifs, marked 1858
- Saint Stephen’s Catholic Church (Kirche St. Stephan), Koblenzer Straße 8 – three-naved, Gothic Revival hall church, 1868–1870
- Behind Kastellauner Straße 27 – bakehouse with well, quarrystone building, marked 1836; village well with pyramidal roof
- At Koblenzer Straße 20 – dance hall; one-floor plastered building, 1920s

== Economy and infrastructure ==
The village's appearance is characterized by two churches that tower over it, a lovely and functional community centre, a kindergarten, two inns, a drink wholesaler, a Trakehner stud farm with a riding facility and several major agricultural businesses.
