= Moselle Viaduct =

Moselle Viaduct Moseltalbrücke
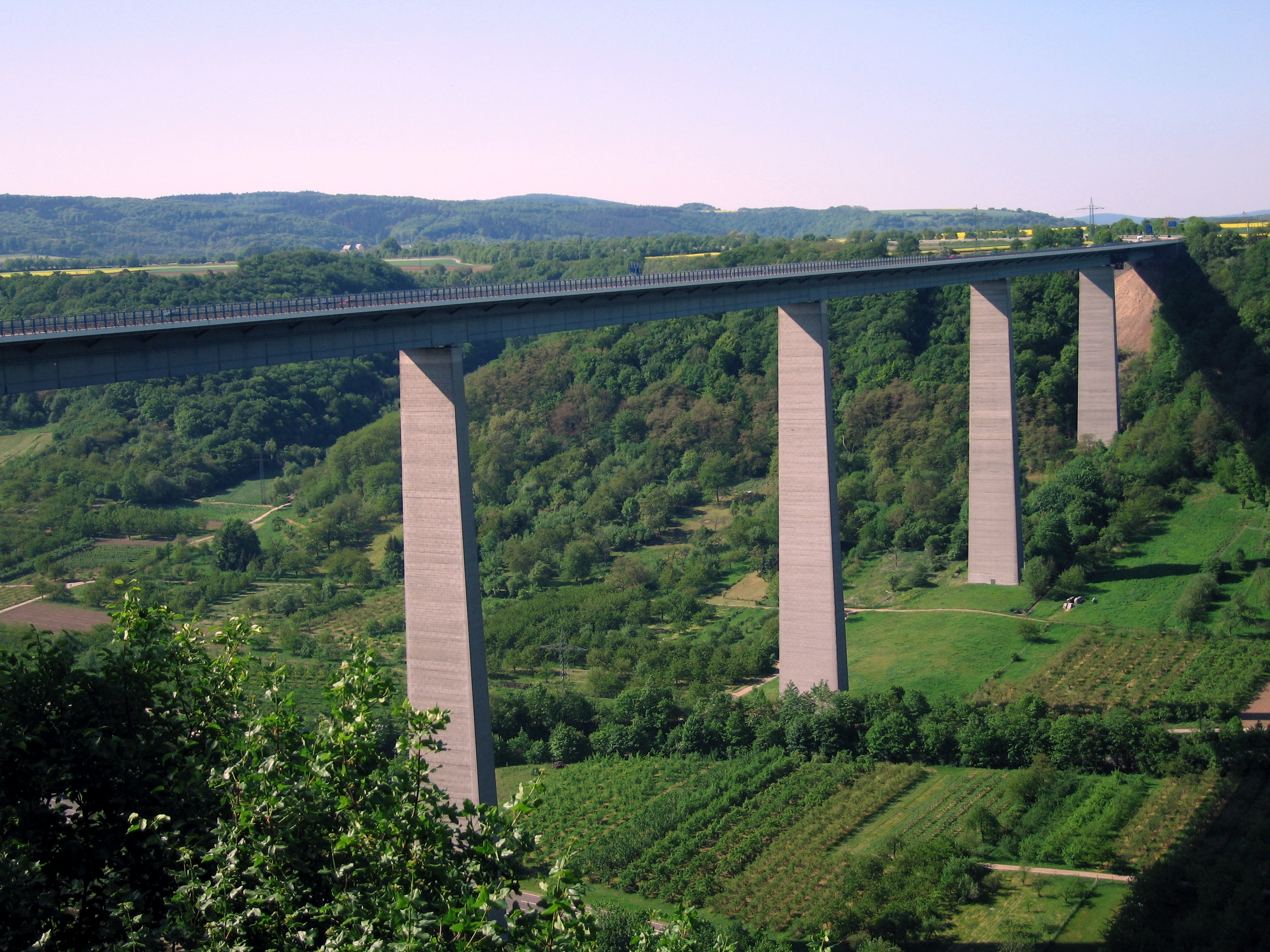
- The Moselle Viaduct seen from an observation site
- Coordinates: 50.314722°N 7.494444°E
- Carries: A 61
- Crosses: River Moselle; Koblenz–Trier railway B49, B411, and B416; Moselradweg
- Locale: Winningen to Dieblich, Germany

Characteristics
- Design: Beam bridge
- Material: Steel
- Total length: 935 metres (3,068 ft)
- Width: 30.5 metres (100 ft)
- Height: 136 metres (446 ft)
- Longest span: 218.2 metres (716 ft)
- No. of spans: 6

History
- Constructed by: Heinz Schnorpfeil Bau GmbH; DSD Dillinger Stahlbau; Ed. Züblin AG; Julius Berger Bauboag AG; Lenz-Bau AG
- Construction start: 1969
- Construction end: 1972
- Construction cost: 39 million DM

Location
- Interactive map of Moselle Viaduct

The Moselle Viaduct (German: Moseltalbrücke) carries the Bundesautobahn 61 over a meander of the river Moselle, connecting the Hunsrück and Eifel mountain ranges. It was built between 1969 and 1972 between the German villages Winningen and Dieblich, about 10 kilometres (6.2 mi) southwest of Koblenz, where the river Moselle flows into the river Rhine.

Moselle Viaduct is also the name of the 1974 bridge where Bundesautobahn 1 between Wittlich and Trier crosses the river Moselle near Schweich.

== History and construction ==
The Federal Ministry of Transport, Building and Urban Development ordered the construction of the Moselle Viaduct with the state road division of Rhineland-Palatinate and the road department of Andernach. The construction was conducted by Heinz Schnorpfeil Bau GmbH, DSD Dillinger Stahlbau, Ed. Züblin AG, Julius Berger Bauboag AG, and Lenz-Bau AG. The total construction costs were 39 million DM.

Like many bridges in the area, it was built as a steel beam bridge. The road deck is 935 metres (3,068 ft) long, 30.5 metres (100 ft) wide and weighs 11,463 tonnes (11,282 long tons; 12,636 short tons). It rests 136 metres (446 ft) above the valley's lowest point on hollow concrete piers with walls of 30 centimetres (12 in) thick, which span respectively 156.8 – 218.2 – 170.5 – 146.1 – 133.9 – 109.6 m (514 – 716 – 559 – 479 – 439 – 360 ft). At the time, it was world's tallest motorway bridge.

Inside the steel deck is a cavity which can be filled with explosives to blow up the northernmost span in case of a war.

The construction works suffered one casualty when on 1 July 1971 an engineer fell off the Blumslay cliff. This later gave rise to the urban legend that he had slipped into one of the hollow piers, and because his body could not be recovered his remains were left at the bottom of the pier.

At the north side of the bridge is a rest area on both sides of the road with an observation site overlooking the Moselle valley and the bridge. One can walk underneath the road deck to the rest area on the opposite side.

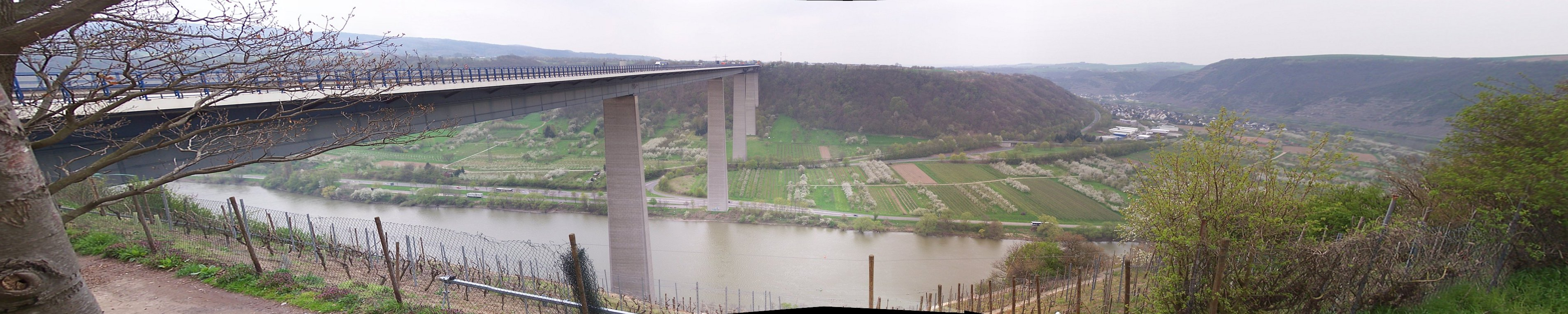

== See also ==
- List of bridges in Germany
