= Laudert =

- Municipality
- Coat of arms

- Location of Laudert within Rhein-Hunsrück-Kreis district
- Interactive map of Laudert
- Location within Germany Location within Rhineland-Palatinate
- Coordinates: 50°4′44″N 7°36′20″E
- Country: Germany
- State: Rhineland-Palatinate
- District: Rhein-Hunsrück-Kreis
- Municipal assoc.: Hunsrück-Mittelrhein

Government
  - Mayor (2019–24): Winfried Erbes

Area
  - Total: 6.17 km^{2} (2.38 sq mi)
- Elevation: 465 m (1,526 ft)

Population (2025-12-31)
  - Total: 463
  - Density: 75.0/km^{2} (194/sq mi)
- Time zone: UTC+01:00 (CET)
  - Summer (DST): UTC+02:00 (CEST)
- Postal codes: 56291
- Dialling codes: 06746
- Vehicle registration: SIM
- Website: www.gemeinde-laudert.de

Laudert is an Ortsgemeinde – a municipality belonging to a Verbandsgemeinde, a kind of collective municipality – in the Rhein-Hunsrück-Kreis (district) in Rhineland-Palatinate, Germany. It belongs to the Verbandsgemeinde Hunsrück-Mittelrhein, whose seat is in Emmelshausen.

== Geography ==
=== Location ===
The municipality lies in the eastern Hunsrück, right on the Autobahn A 61 and the Simmerbach, 8 km from Oberwesel on the Rhine to the northeast.

== History ==
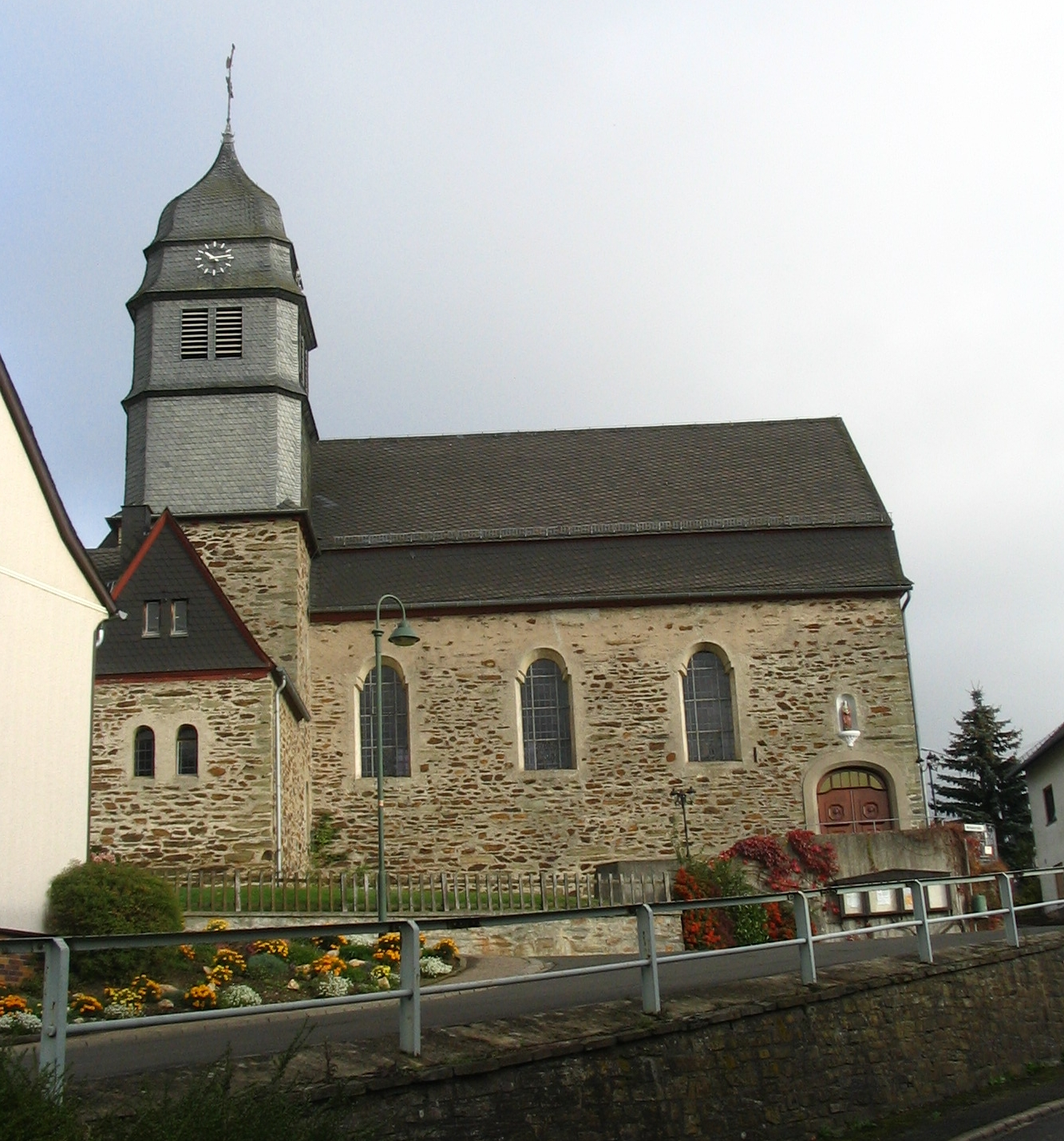
Church in the village centre

The Hunsrück plateau was settled relatively late judging from archaeological finds made thus far, in roughly 500 BC, that is, the late Iron Age. When the first settlers came to what is now Laudert, however, is unknown. The name "Laudert" can likely be traced to Ludinsroth, meaning "Ludin’s Clearing".

North of Laudert, cleft here and there by the Autobahn or high-voltage transmission lines, is an otherwise continuous expanse of higher-elevation forest growing above mainly greywacke bedrock. In these woods, roughly a kilometre away from the village, in a swampy area that once afforded protection against attackers, is a flat-topped, motte-like mound. It is rectangular and girded by two earthen walls, one inside the other, between which lay water traps (not, apparently, a continuous moat). A manmade hillock that still stands on this "motte" may once have been topped by a defensive tower. The complex, known locally as the Alte Burg ("Old Castle"), cannot be dated with any certainty. Nearby, the two Roman roads, the one between Bingen and Koblenz and the one between Oberwesel and Treis, crossed each other, leading to the assumption that the complex was likely built in Roman times.

The opening and use of the region came about according to practical and economic considerations. A climatically and geologically favourable spot was chosen and then cleared. All too often, two settlements arose right next to each other and their growth led them to spread out, and into the short stretch of land between them. When both settlements’ clearing work met in the middle, the question of the boundary between the two always came to a head. New settlement, working the land and repopulation took their turns over the centuries as the opening of the Hunsrück spread from existing settlements in the surrounding river valleys up into the heights themselves. The whole process was largely completed by about 1200.

Laudert was divided into two villages. It is unknown whether the division came about as the result of two separately founded villages which grew towards each other as in the example above, and the evidence does not support this hypothesis anyway. Far likelier is that the split was brought about by the various landholders’ activities: enfeoffments, donations and pledges. The two parts of the village are known in Laudert's history as Laudert-trierisch and Laudert-pfälzisch for the Electorate of Trier and the Electoral Palatinate sides respectively. The Frankish kings, by virtue of the right of conquest, took over what had been Roman state domain, which led to many other holdings and lordly rights. The great territorial pledges of the 13th and 14th centuries to the feudal lords entailed an utter relinquishment of the economic and lordly might that attended Imperial domains, Reichsgut, and it further saw too it that there were frequent changes in lordship.

This was as much so in the two Lauderts as it was elsewhere. It is known that Laudert – although it is not known which half – passed on 25 March 1275 as the result of a compromise to the nobleman (his rank is not mentioned) of Milewald. (At this time, the village was known as Ludinroit, which later developed into Ludenrod). Later, in the 14th century, this nobleman's successor enfeoffed Prince-Archbishop-Elector Baldwin of Trier with the village (or perhaps both villages). In 1400, the village was a fief held by the Lords of Schöneck. In 1440, Laudert passed to Duke Stephan. After a division of holdings in 1787, Laudert-trierisch was assigned to the Electorate of Trier and Laudert-pfälzisch to the Counts Palatine (that is, to the Palatinate). The more easterly of these two Lauderts was thereafter assigned to the Amt of Oberwesel, which in turn was under the Trier Oberamt of Simmern. The split led to each half of the village going its own way politically and denominationally according to each one's overlord's beliefs. Each had its own administration and its own property. Beginning in 1794, Laudert lay under French rule. In 1815 it was assigned to the Kingdom of Prussia at the Congress of Vienna.

The Remigiuskapelle ("Saint Remigius’s Chapel") in the graveyard in Laudert shows evidence of Frankish influence. The column in the chapel's tower comes from the Romanesque period (11th/12th century). Among the deeds of visitation of the parish of Damscheid it is noted that in 1657, Laudert held ownership of a chapel that had fallen into disrepair, an overhaul of which should be undertaken. This work was done in 1681. A windowpane bearing the year 1681 and a Latin inscription saying "The Most Reverend and Illustrious Abbot of Schönau" shows a connection with Matthias Schorn, the Prelate of Schönau. In 1860 the chapel was restored once again; the tower was removed and a new one built. The chapel's outside was last renovated in 1994 after having been rebuilt in 1961 in a smaller form.

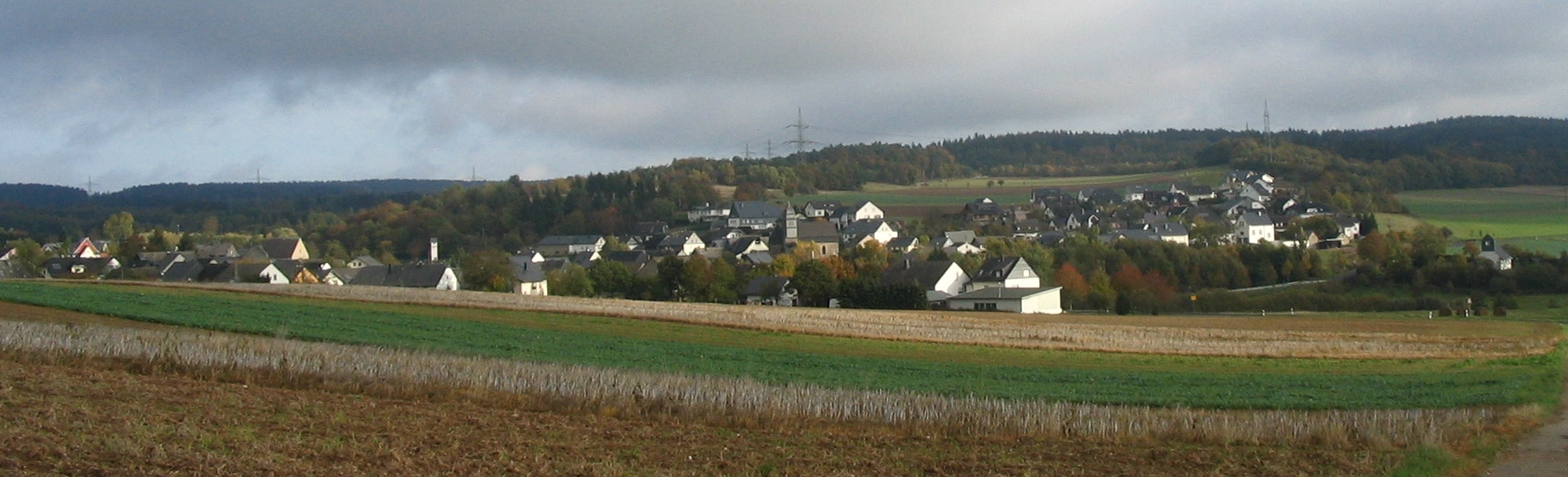
Southwest view of Laudert

Laudert-pfälzisch, which in 1607 was home to only three families, belonged between 1656 and 1706 to the Reformed parish of Horn. Within the framework of a new order, the old parish of Pleizenhausen was resurrected and split off from Horn, whereby Laudert-pfälzisch was first directly subject to Pleizenhausen, and then, beginning in 1716, to the branch parish of Kisselbach-Schönenberg. After a change in lordship on the Palatine side, the Catholic faith was once again allowed and promoted. The village's Catholics at first belonged to Perscheid and then later, until 1706, to the parish of Simmern, whereafter they were joined with the parish of Rayerschied. The majority of inhabitants at this time lived in the more easterly part of the double village (the side nearer the Rhine), which made them Electorate of Trier subjects and therefore, following the rule in force in those days, always Catholic. As such, they were first put under Saint Martin's parish in Oberwesel, until they were parochially united with Damscheid in 1713. On 27 October 1805, the parish of Lingerhahn was founded. The Catholic congregations in both Laudert-trierisch and Laudert-pfälzisch were grouped into it as branches. Only in 1860 were the Catholics on the Palatine side granted the right to bury their dead in the graveyard on the Trier side. The church built in 1926 was attended from the outset by Catholics from both sides. This church was built to plans by the architects Becker and Falkowski of Mainz. The first school – for Laudert-trierisch only – was built in 1865. The Catholic children in Laudert-pfälzisch went to school in Maisborn and the Evangelical children to Riegenroth. Children from both sides of the village, however, attended the school built in 1906 by craftsmen from Laudert. After the Second World War, this school could no longer meet the community's needs, and another was built in 1957. This, however, is no longer a school, but rather a community centre. It served as a school for only eleven years until 1 August 1968, when all schoolchildren in the fifth to ninth years were sent instead to the Mittelpunktschule ("midpoint school", a central school, designed to eliminate smaller outlying schools) in Oberwesel. On 1 August 1971, Laudert's primary school, too, was dissolved.

Since 1946, Laudert has been part of the then newly founded state of Rhineland-Palatinate.

== Politics ==
=== Municipal council ===
The council is made up of 8 council members, who were elected by majority vote at the municipal election held on 7 June 2009, and the honorary mayor as chairman.

=== Mayor ===
Laudert's mayor is Winfried Erbes.

=== Coat of arms ===
The German blazon reads: Schild durch blauen Wellenbalken geteilt, oben in Schwarz ein wachsender rotbewehrter, -gezungter und gekrönter goldener Löwe, unten in Silber ein rotes Balkenkreuz.

The municipality's arms might in English heraldic language be described thus: A fess wavy azure between sable a demilion issuant from the fess Or, armed, langued and crowned gules, and argent a cross of the fourth.

According to one explanation from the state archive, the charges in the arms were suggested by historical and geographical factors. In the old Empire, the Simmerbach, represented in the arms by the wavy blue fess (horizontal stripe), marked the boundary between Laudert's two halves, one of which was under the Electoral Palatinate rule, here symbolized by the Palatine Lion, and the other of which was under the Electorate of Trier rule, thus explaining the Trier Cross below the fess.

The coat of arms has been official since 7 August 1974.

== Culture and sightseeing ==
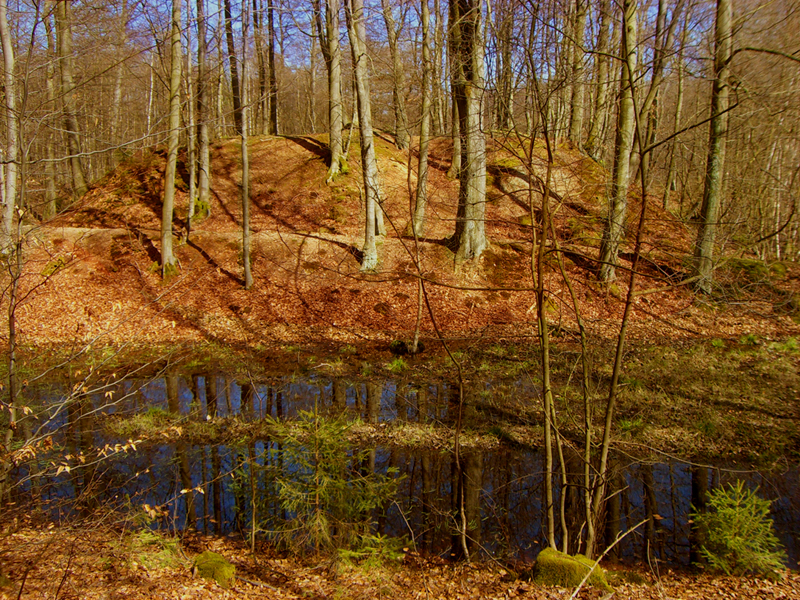
North of the village: the "Old Castle"

=== Buildings ===
The following are listed buildings or sites in Rhineland-Palatinate’s Directory of Cultural Monuments:

- Saint Remigius’s Catholic Church (Kirche St. Remigius), Mittelstraße 20 – Baroque Revival aisleless church, 1923–1926, architects Ludwig Becker and Anton Falkowski, Mainz
- Near Bergstraße 29 – water cistern, Art Nouveau, marked 1912
- Graveyard – Romanesque column in graveyard chapel’s gable as spolia (Saint Remigius’s Chapel)
- Mittelstraße 3 – former school with teacher’s dwelling; plastered building, Gothic Revival motifs, marked 1906
- Mittelstraße 9 – timber-frame house, partly solid, 18th century; whole complex of buildings with commercial wing
- Mittelstraße 37 – timber-frame house, plastered, 19th century; whole complex of buildings with commercial building
- Wall complex, north of the village – so-called Alte Burg ("Old Castle"); motte-like complex, 11th or 12th century, two manmade earthen walls, moat, tower hill, rectangular graves
