= Bundesautobahn 560 =

Federal motorway in Germany

A 560
- Bundesautobahn 560
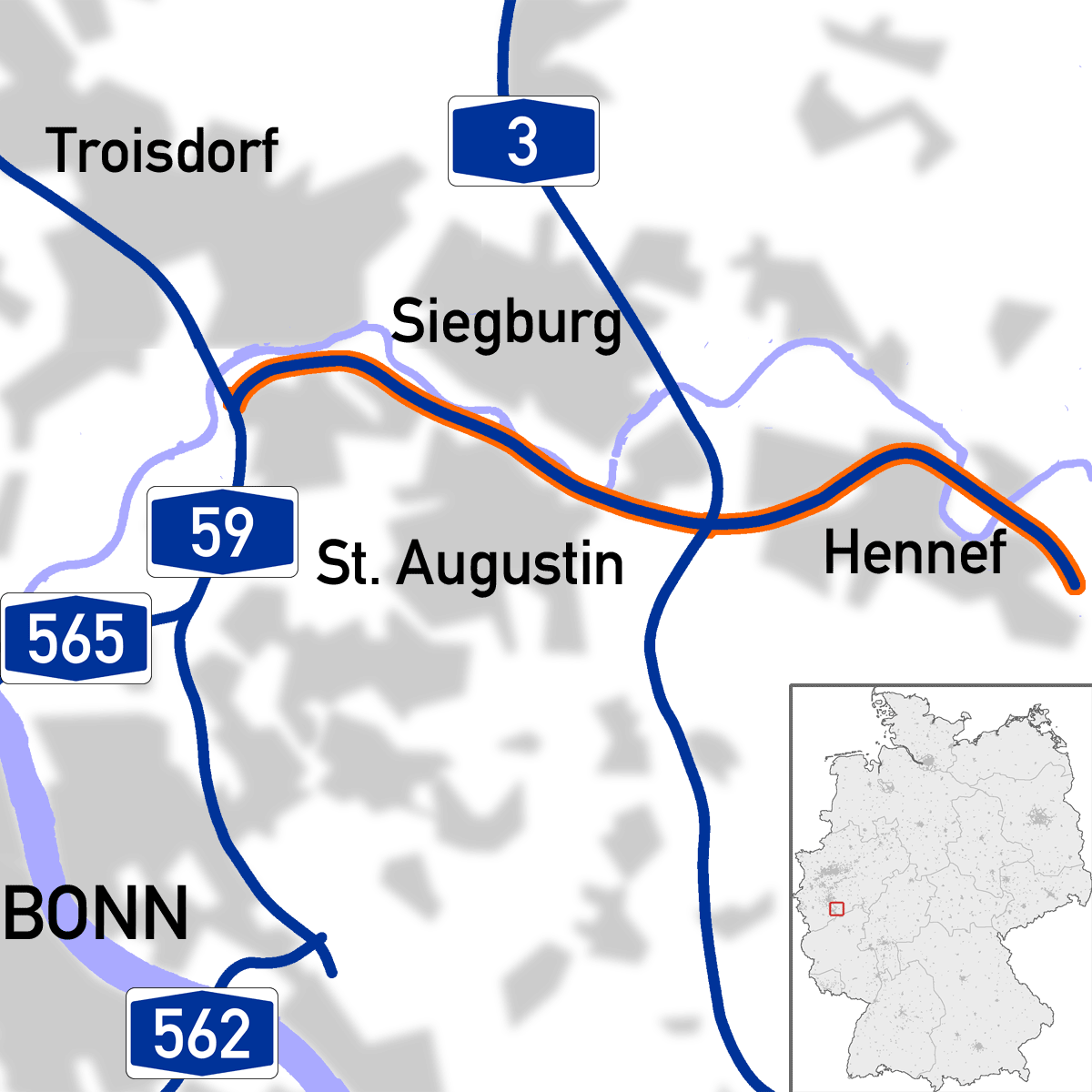

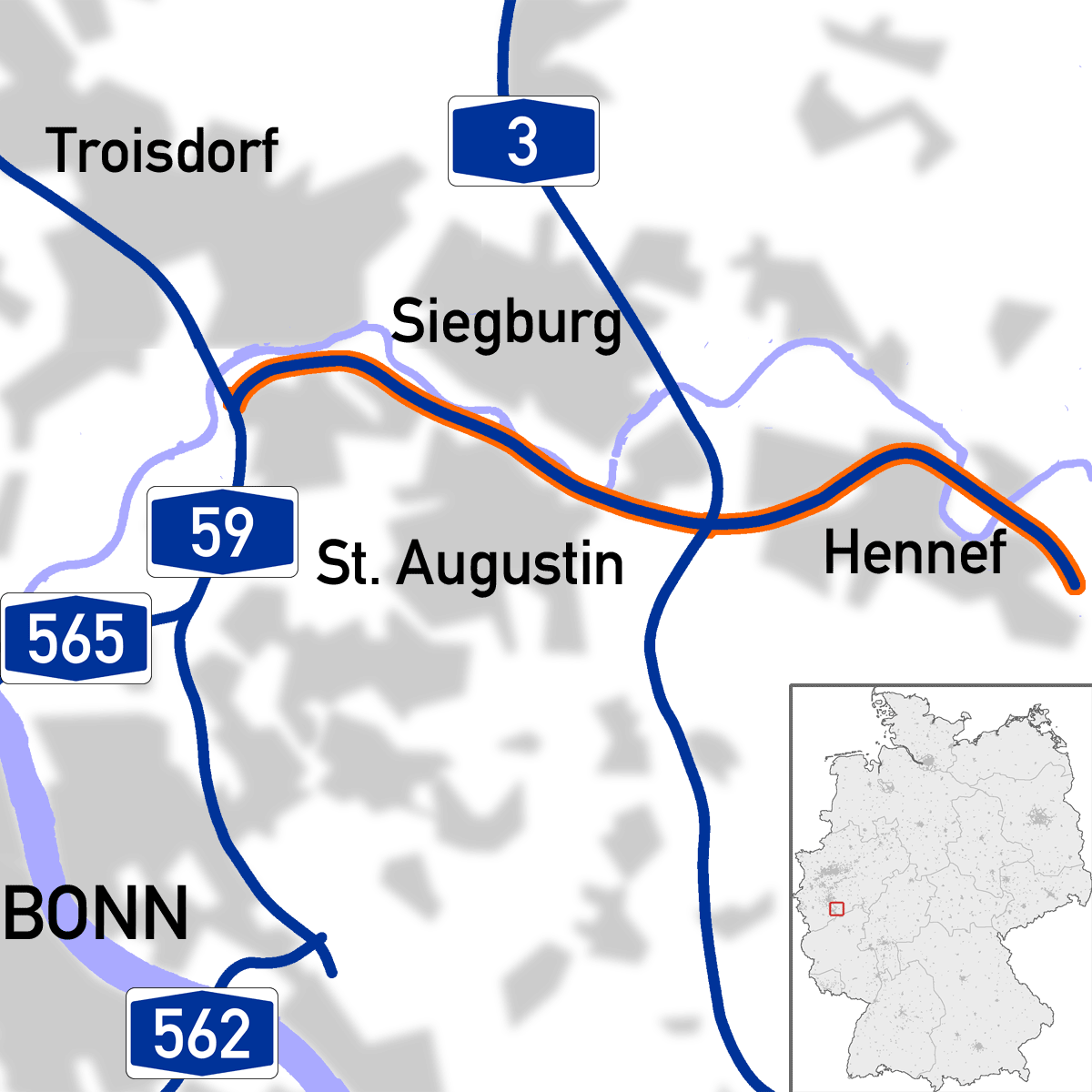

Route information
- Length: 13.2 km (8.2 mi)

Major junctions
- West end: Sankt Augustin
- East end: Hennef (Sieg)

Location
- Country: Germany
- States: North Rhine-Westphalia

Highway system
- Roads in Germany; Autobahns; List; Federal; List; State; E-roads

Bundesautobahn 560 (translates from German as Federal Motorway 560, short form Autobahn 560, abbreviated as BAB 560 or A 560) is an autobahn in Germany.

The A 560 connects the towns of Sankt Augustin, Siegburg and Hennef (Sieg) to the A 59, A 3 and the immediate Bonn area.

The freeway was opened in several stages. The first stage was a 2 km stretch from the A 59 to the junction Siegburg (then named Sankt Augustin-West), which was opened in 1974. The next portion, from Siegburg to 500 m before Niederpleis, opened seven years later. Attention then turned to the eastern end. The section from Hennef (Sieg)-West to the end of the freeway opened in 1986, leaving a gap of about 3 km between the two sections. The 500 m that was left before Niederpleis, plus the junction itself, opened in 1988; a further 1 km and an interchange with the A 3 opened in 1990; and the final 2 km were completed in 1992.

After continuing northeast past the junction Hennef (Sieg)-West, the A 560 suddenly takes a 90-degree turn and begins heading to the southeast. This was to be the location of an intersection with a planned autobahn, variously numbered in government documents as the A 113 or the A 31. (Both numbers are currently in use in other locations.) The autobahn was envisioned as running from Emden, south to Bottrop, then Essen, Mülheim an der Ruhr, Wuppertal, Solingen, Bergisch Gladbach, Siegburg, and Königswinter, ending at Bad Neuenahr-Ahrweiler. Construction was planned to start in the mid-1970s; however, the project met heavy community opposition in Mülheim, and only the section from Emden to Bottrop was ever built and signed as the A 31. The A 560 between junctions 6 and 8, along with all of the A 573, were built along the A 31's planned alignment.

== Exit list ==
(1)	Sankt Augustin-West 3-way interchange A 59
(2)	Siegburg B 56
(3)	Sankt Augustin B 56
(4)	Niederpleis
(5)	4-way interchange Bonn/Siegburg A 3 E35
(6)	Hennef (Sieg)-West
	Siegbrücke 400 m
	Siegbrücke 150 m
(7)	Hennef (Sieg)-Ost B 478
(8)	Hennef B 8
B 8	Road continues as the B 8 towards Limburg an der Lahn
