= Bundesautobahn 61 =

Federal motorway in Germany

A 61
- Bundesautobahn 61
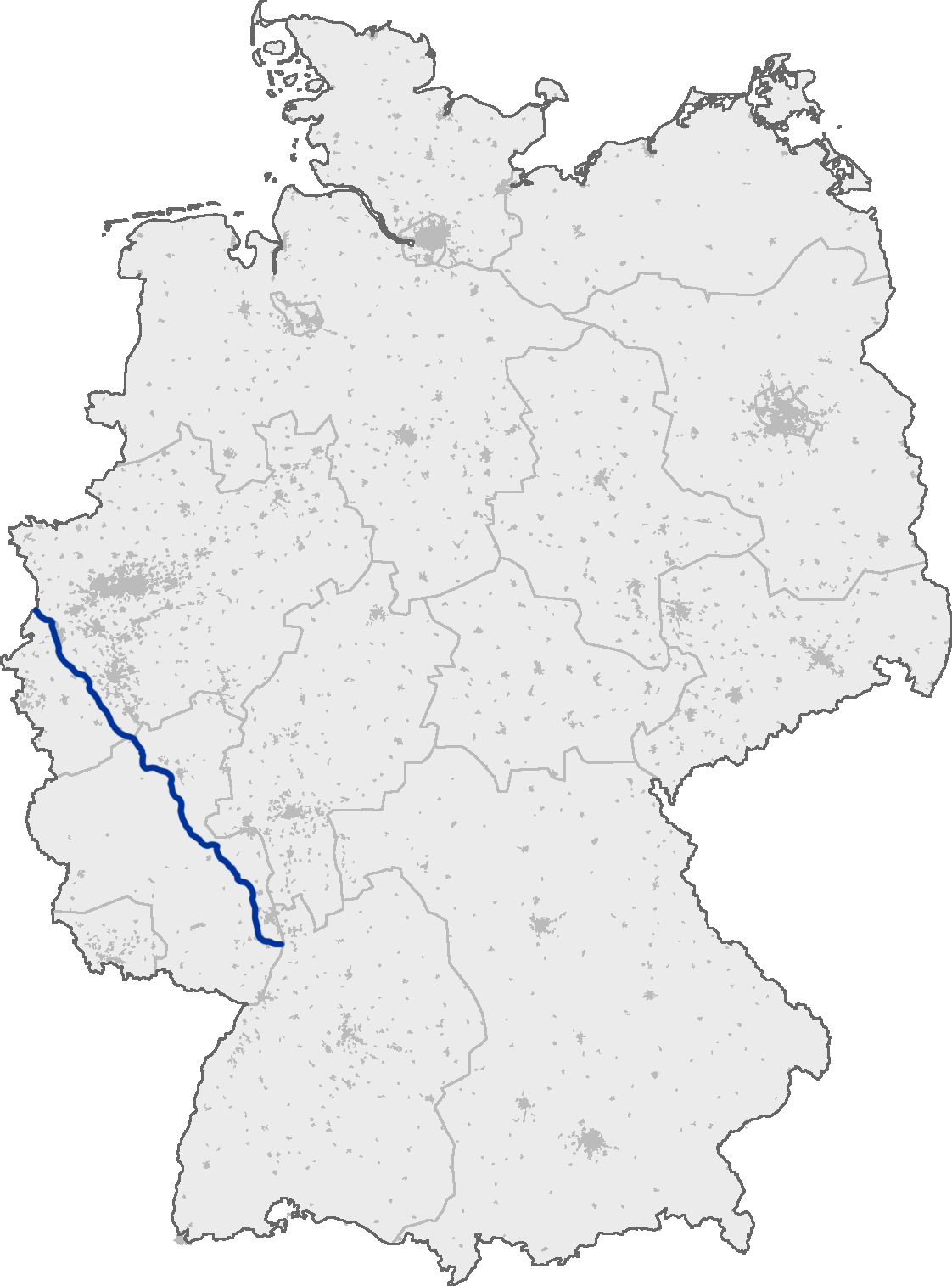

Route information
- Length: 331 km (206 mi)

Major junctions
- North end: Bundesautobahn 44 in Titz, North Rhine-Westphalia
- South end: Bundesautobahn 48 in Bassenheim, Rhineland-Palatinate

Location
- Country: Germany
- States: North Rhine-Westphalia, Rhineland-Palatinate, Baden-Württemberg

Highway system
- Roads in Germany; Autobahns; List; Federal; List; State; E-roads

Bundesautobahn 61 (translates from German as Federal Motorway 61, short form Autobahn 61, abbreviated as BAB 61 or A 61) is an autobahn in Germany that connects the border to the Netherlands near Venlo in the northwest to the interchange with A 6 near Hockenheim. In 1965, this required a redesign of the Hockenheimring.

The autobahn runs parallel to the A 3 on the opposite side of the Rhine. Between Mönchengladbach and Bergheim in the north and Worms, Ludwigshafen and Speyer in the south, it cuts through the landscapes of Eifel and Hunsrück, avoiding areas of dense population while still in proximity to Cologne, Bonn, Koblenz and Bingen.

The A 61, built in the 1970s, is the most western connection from the Netherlands and Belgium to southern Germany so many trucks and tourists from these countries frequent the A 61.

Between Kreuz Mönchengladbach and Wanlo, the speed limit is 120 km/h (75 mph).

The section between the junctions Wanlo and Jackerath was upgraded to three lanes in 2005. The speed limit there is 130 km/h (81 mph), paid for by RWE Power that in return received permission to close a section of A 44 for their Garzweiler surface mining operation. By 2017, the A 44 will be restored and the Wanlo-Jackerath-section of the A 61 will be closed instead.

Between Dreieck Erfttal and Kreuz Bliesheim the A 1 and A 61 run concurrently. The motorway has three lanes each way and a variable speed limit here.

As of 4 April 2012, the A 61 continues into the Netherlands as A74. This short motorway connects the A 61 at the border with the Dutch A 73. Previously, all traffic had to go through the city of Venlo.

Part of the A61 motorway near the village of Gelsdorf had been designed for use as a runway to service travel to the nearby Government bunker facility and in an emergency a section would have been dedicated for use as an airport with spacious aircraft parking spaces at both ends disguised as roadside car parks.

== Exit list ==
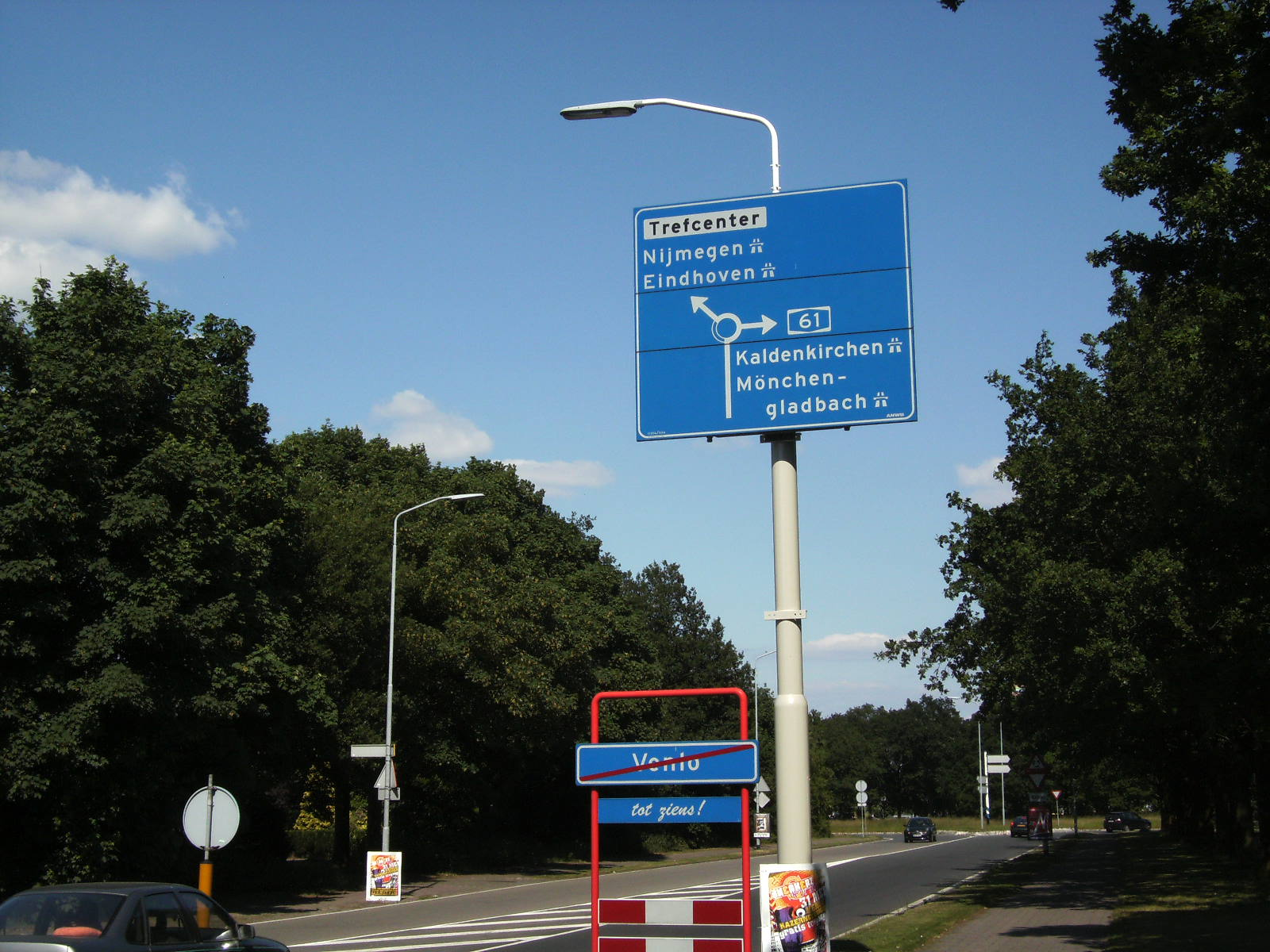
The old start of the A61 in Venlo, border area Netherlands/Germany (Keulse Plein)

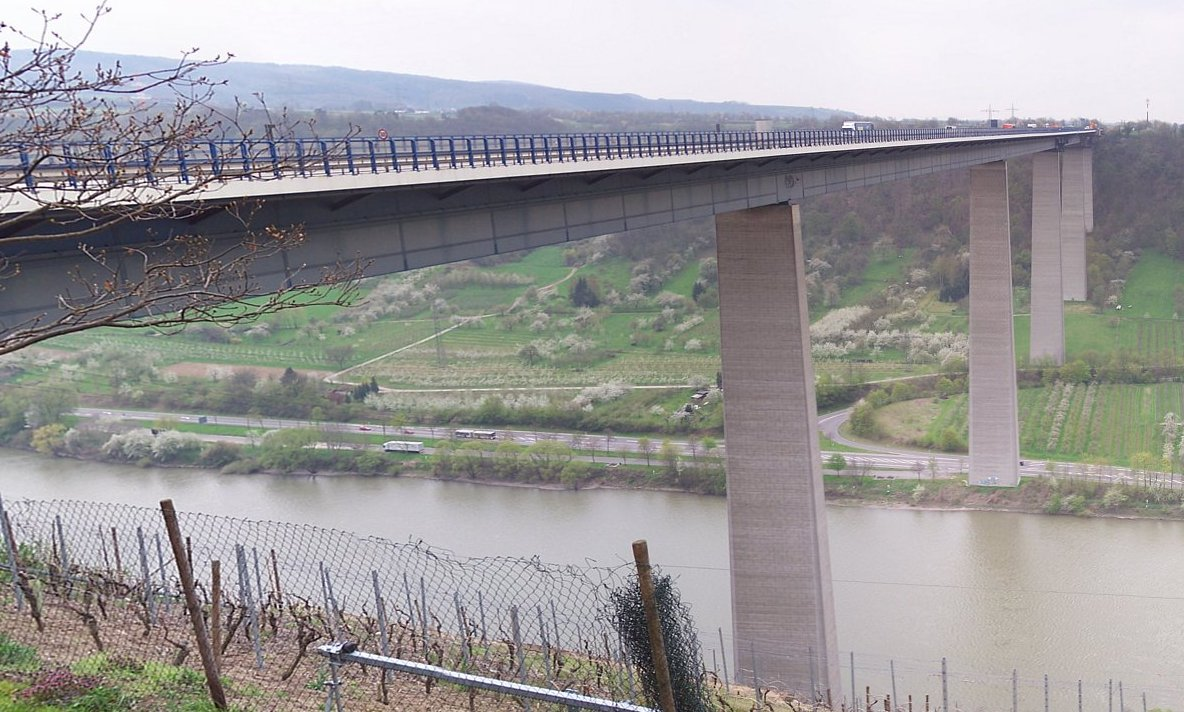
Moselle Viaduct

Autobahn 61 by the base of the Hunsrück Mountains near the town of Bingen

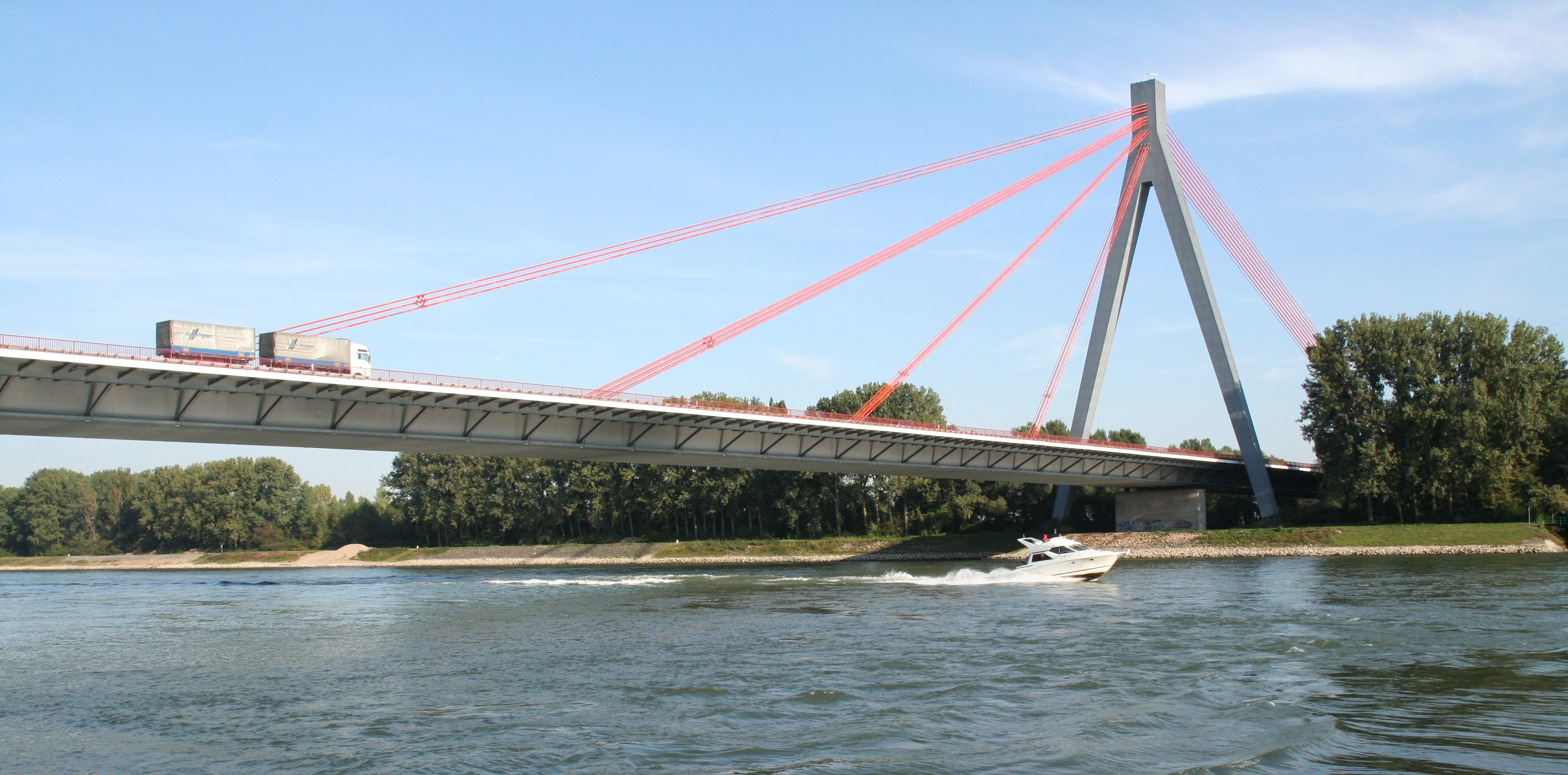

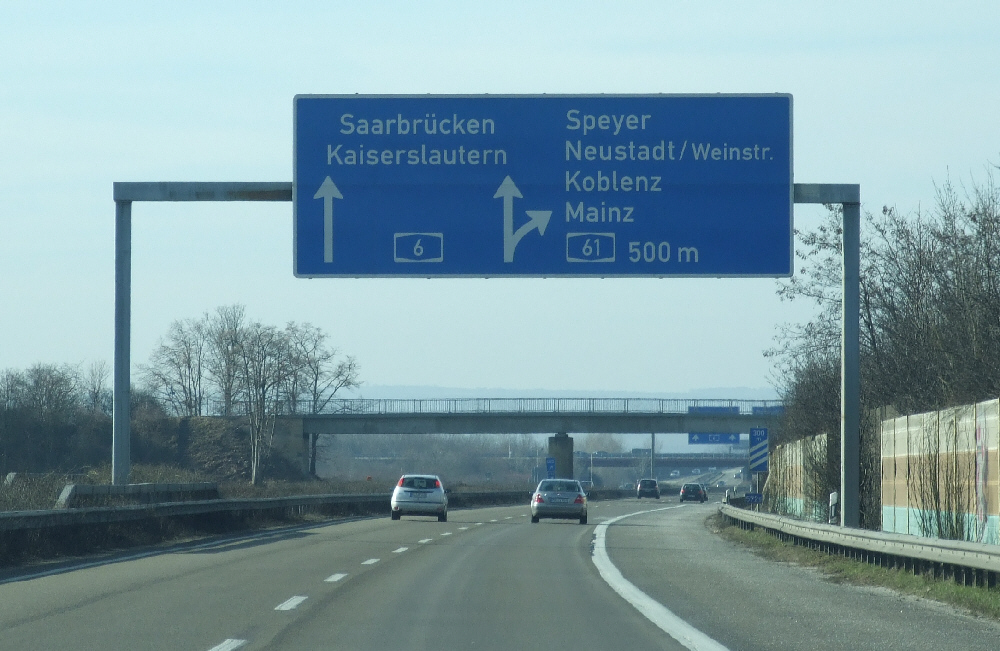

	Netherlands A 74
(1a)	Border crossing Heidenend
(1b)	Nettetal-West
(2)	Kaldenkirchen
(3)	Kaldenkirchen-Süd
(4)	Breyell
(5)	Nettetal
(6)	Süchteln
(7)	Viersen
(8)	Mackenstein
(9)	Mönchengladbach 4-way interchange A 52
(10)	Mönchengladbach-Nordpark
(11)	Mönchengladbach-Holt
(12)	Mönchengladbach-Rheydt
(13)	Mönchengladbach-Wickrath
(14)	Mönchengladbach-Güdderath
(15)	MG-Wanlo 4-way interchange A 46
(incl.)	Wanlo (new exit)
(16)	Jackerath 4-way interchange A 44
	Services Bedburger Land
(17)	Bedburg
(18)	Bergheim
(19)	Bergheim-Süd
(20)	Kerpen (Note: 50°53′40″N 6°41′44″E Kreuz Kerpen) 4-way interchange A 4 E40
(21)	Türnich
(22)	Gymnich - Nörvenich
(23)	Erfttal 3-way interchange A 1 E31
(108)	Erftstadt
(24)	Bliesheim 4-way interchange A 1 E29 A 553
(25)	Weilerswist
(26)	Swisttal-Heimerzheim
(27)	Miel
	Services Peppenhoven
(28)	Rheinbach
(29)	Meckenheim 4-way interchange A 565
	Goldene Meile parking area
(30)	Bad Neuenahr-Ahrweiler 3-way interchange A 573
	Talbrücke Bengen ca. 1000 m
	Ahrtalbrücke 1521 m
(31)	Sinzig 3-way interchange A 571
	Vinxtbachtalbrücke 670 m
(32)	Niederzissen
	Brohltalbrücke 603 m
	Services Brohltal
(33)	Wehr
(34)	Mendig
(35)	Kruft
	Nettebrücke 700 m
(36)	Plaidt
(37)	Koblenz 4-way interchange A 48 E44
(38)	Koblenz-Metternich
	Raststätte Winningen
	Moselle Viaduct (Note: 50°18′53″N 7°29′40″E Moselle Viaduct) Winningen 935 m
(39)	Koblenz/Dieblich
	Services Mosel
(40)	Koblenz/Waldesch
(41)	Boppard
(42)	Emmelshausen
(43)	Pfalzfeld
(44)	Laudert
	Guldenbachbrücke 200 m
(45)	Rheinböllen
	Pfädchensgrabentalbrücke 665 m
	Tiefenbachtalbrücke 365 m
	Services Hunsrück
(46)	Stromberg (Hunsrück)
(47)	Waldlaubersheim
(48)	Dorsheim
	Nahetalbrücke 523 m
(49)	Bingen
(50)	Nahetal 3-way interchange A 60 E42
(51)	Bad Kreuznach
(52)	Gau-Bickelheim
(53)	Bornheim
(54)	Alzey (Note: 49°46′30″N 8°06′40″E Alzey Kreuz) 4-way interchange A 63
(55)	Alzey
	Talbrücke Alzey 539 m
	Talbrücke Dautenheim 390 m
(56)	Gundersheim
(57)	Worms/Mörstadt
	Services Wonnegau
	Talbrücke Pfeddersheim 1.471 m
(58)	Worms
(59)	Frankenthal 4-way interchange A 6 E50
(60)	Ludwigshafen 4-way interchange A 650
(61)	Mutterstadt 4-way interchange A 65
	Services Dannstadt
(62)	Schifferstadt
(63)	Speyer
	Rheinbrücke 478 m
(64)	Hockenheim
(65)	Hockenheim (Note: 49°20′00″N 8°33′06″E Hockenheim Dreieck) 3-way interchange A 6 E50

Exit Coordinate list

Termini Coordinate list
