= Horn, Rhineland-Palatinate =

Horn
- Municipality
- Location of Horn within Rhein-Hunsrück-Kreis district
- Interactive map of Horn
- Location within Germany Location within Rhineland-Palatinate
- Coordinates: 50°2′48″N 7°32′32″E
- Country: Germany
- State: Rhineland-Palatinate
- District: Rhein-Hunsrück-Kreis
- Municipal assoc.: Simmern-Rheinböllen

Government
  - Mayor (2019–24): Volker Härter

Area
  - Total: 6.86 km^{2} (2.65 sq mi)
- Elevation: 440 m (1,440 ft)

Population (2025-12-31)
  - Total: 388
  - Density: 56.6/km^{2} (146/sq mi)
- Time zone: UTC+01:00 (CET)
  - Summer (DST): UTC+02:00 (CEST)
- Postal codes: 55469
- Dialling codes: 06766
- Vehicle registration: SIM
- Website: www.horn-hunsrueck.de

Horn (German pronunciation: [hɔʁn]) is an Ortsgemeinde – a municipality belonging to a Verbandsgemeinde, a kind of collective municipality – in the Rhein-Hunsrück-Kreis (district) in Rhineland-Palatinate, Germany. It belongs to the Verbandsgemeinde Simmern-Rheinböllen, whose seat is in Simmern.

== Geography ==
=== Location ===
The municipality lies in the Hunsrück roughly 7 km east-southeast of Kastellaun and 6 km north of Simmern.

== History ==
Bearing witness to early human habitation in the Horn area are Roman and Neolithic archaeological finds. There is also a mediaeval motte-and-bailey castle.

In the 12th century, Horn had its first documentary mention in connection with the noble family that bore the same name, but it seems that the actual “first mention” in 1135 is a falsified document. Nevertheless, a genuine document from 1166 has the same contents and names the same persons, thus confirming the 12th century, at least, as the earliest time when the village is known to have existed.

Together with Laubach and Bubach, Horn belonged at this time to the imperial demesne, the Reichsgut. Landholdings seem to have been held by a noble family von Horn. It could be that this family's noble seat was at the castle, the Horner Burg. The complex's remnants can be found west of the village. In shape it was a special form of motte-and-bailey. In 1567, Johann von Koppenstein sold Meinhard von Schöneberg the remnants.

In 1302, Horn was pledged to the Counts of Sponheim and thereafter ended up with the Counts Palatine. In 1367, Horn was granted limited town rights. In 1410, the village passed to the newly formed Duchy of Simmern, and in 1673 it passed back to Electoral Palatinate. Beginning in 1794, Horn lay under French rule. In 1814 it was assigned to the Kingdom of Prussia at the Congress of Vienna. Since 1946, it has been part of the then newly founded state of Rhineland-Palatinate.

== Politics ==
=== Municipal council ===
The council is made up of 8 council members, who were elected by majority vote at the municipal election held on 7 June 2009, and the honorary mayor as chairman.

=== Mayor ===
Horn's mayor is Volker Härter.

== Culture and sightseeing ==
=== Buildings ===
The following are listed buildings or sites in Rhineland-Palatinate’s Directory of Cultural Monuments:

- Evangelical church, Wilhelm-Oertel-Straße 11 – Baroque aisleless church, 1781/1782, princely Salm court master builder Johann Thomas Petri; Baroque graveyard wall; whole complex of buildings with graveyard
- Hauptstraße 29 – timber-frame Quereinhaus (a combination residential and commercial house divided for these two purposes down the middle, perpendicularly to the street), 19th century
- Hauptstraße 30 – one-floor quarrystone building, earlier half of the 19th century
- Wilhelm-Oertel-Straße – cast-iron fountain basin, Rheinböllen Ironworks, late 19th century
- Wilhelm-Oertel-Straße 4 – former rectory; estate complex: house, marked 1750, timber-frame barn/stable, partly solid, latter half of the 19th century; whole complex of buildings
- Ringwall, south of Horn – so-called Horner Burg; defensive complex, 10th or 11th century
