= Dieblich =

- Municipality
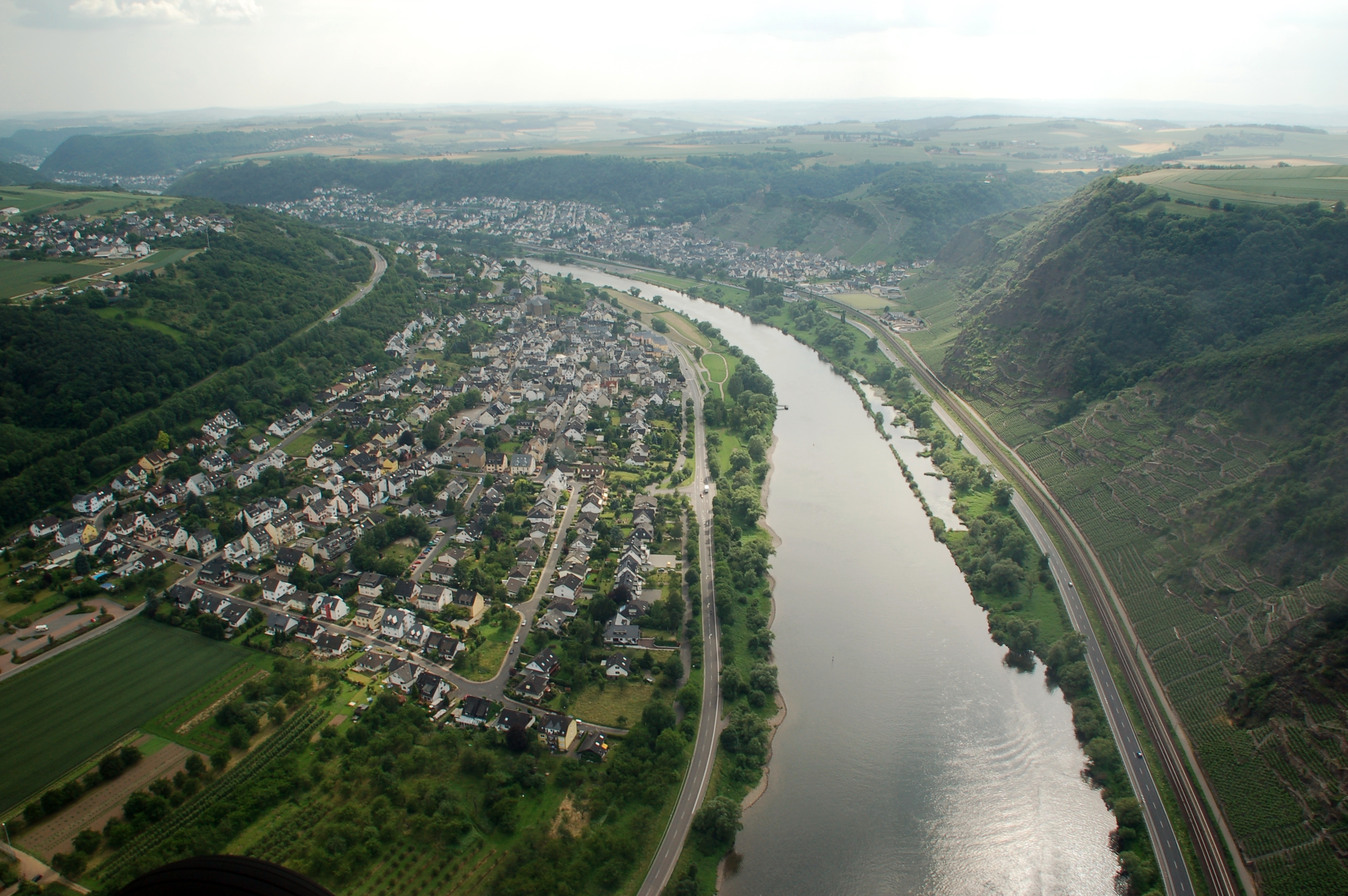

- Coat of arms

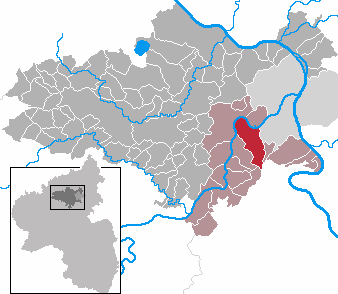
- Location of Dieblich within Mayen-Koblenz district
- Interactive map of Dieblich
- Location within Germany Location within Rhineland-Palatinate
- Coordinates: 50°18′49″N 7°28′07″E
- Country: Germany
- State: Rhineland-Palatinate
- District: Mayen-Koblenz
- Municipal assoc.: Rhein-Mosel
- Subdivisions: 4

Government
  - Mayor (2019–24): Andreas Perscheid

Area
  - Total: 17.68 km^{2} (6.83 sq mi)
- Elevation: 70–400 m (230–1,310 ft)

Population (2025-12-31)
  - Total: 2,569
  - Density: 145.3/km^{2} (376.3/sq mi)
- Time zone: UTC+01:00 (CET)
  - Summer (DST): UTC+02:00 (CEST)
- Postal codes: 56332
- Dialling codes: 02607
- Vehicle registration: MYK

Dieblich is a municipality in the district of Mayen-Koblenz in Rhineland-Palatinate, western Germany.
