= Budenbach =

- Municipality
- Coat of arms

- Location of Budenbach within Rhein-Hunsrück-Kreis district
- Interactive map of Budenbach
- Location within Germany Location within Rhineland-Palatinate
- Coordinates: 50°2′13.11″N 7°34′2.80″E
- Country: Germany
- State: Rhineland-Palatinate
- District: Rhein-Hunsrück-Kreis
- Municipal assoc.: Simmern-Rheinböllen

Government
  - Mayor (2019–24): Manfred Manderscheid

Area
  - Total: 3.51 km^{2} (1.36 sq mi)
- Elevation: 381 m (1,250 ft)

Population (2025-12-31)
  - Total: 194
  - Density: 55.3/km^{2} (143/sq mi)
- Time zone: UTC+01:00 (CET)
  - Summer (DST): UTC+02:00 (CEST)
- Postal codes: 55469
- Dialling codes: 06766
- Vehicle registration: SIM
- Website: www.budenbach.org

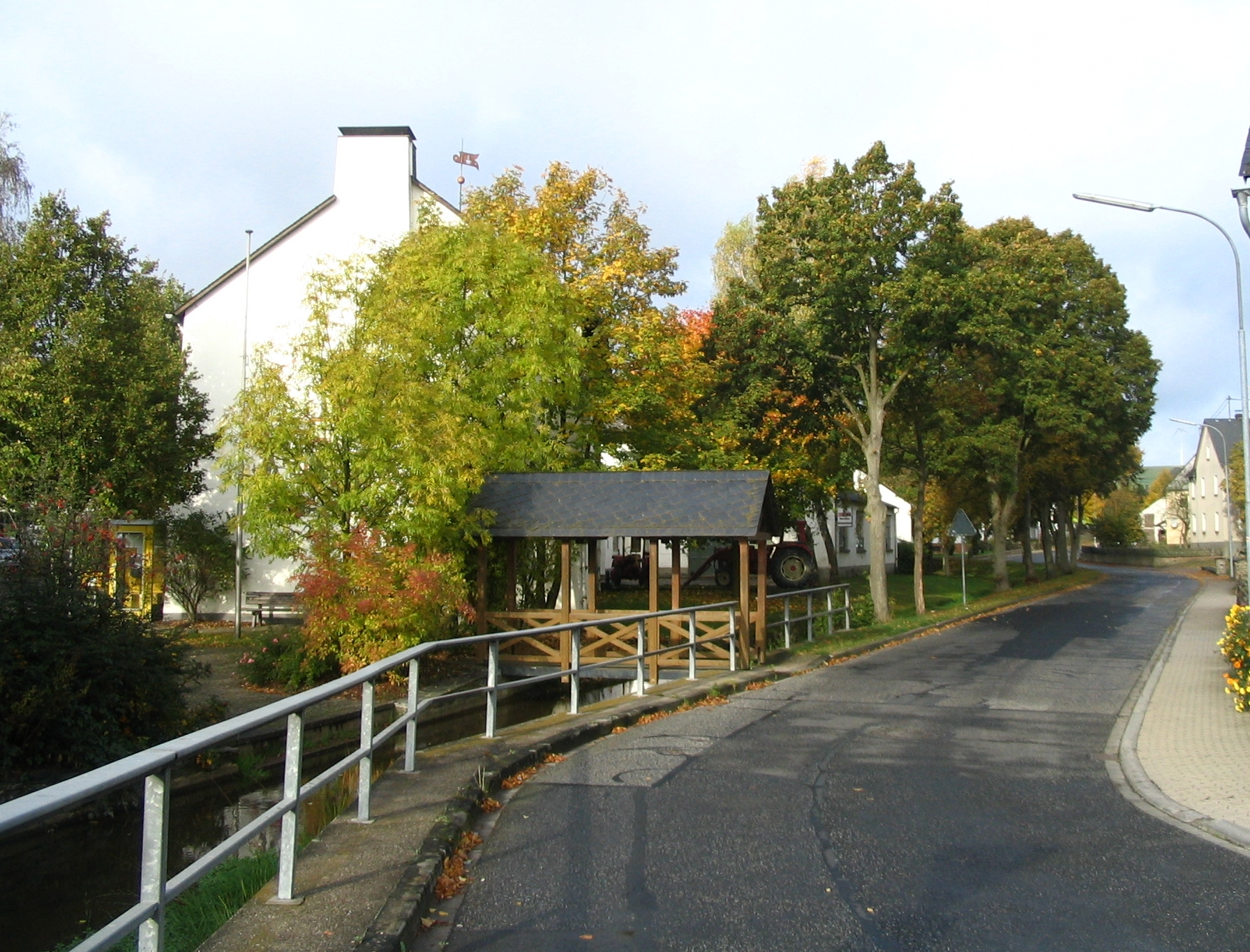
Village centre

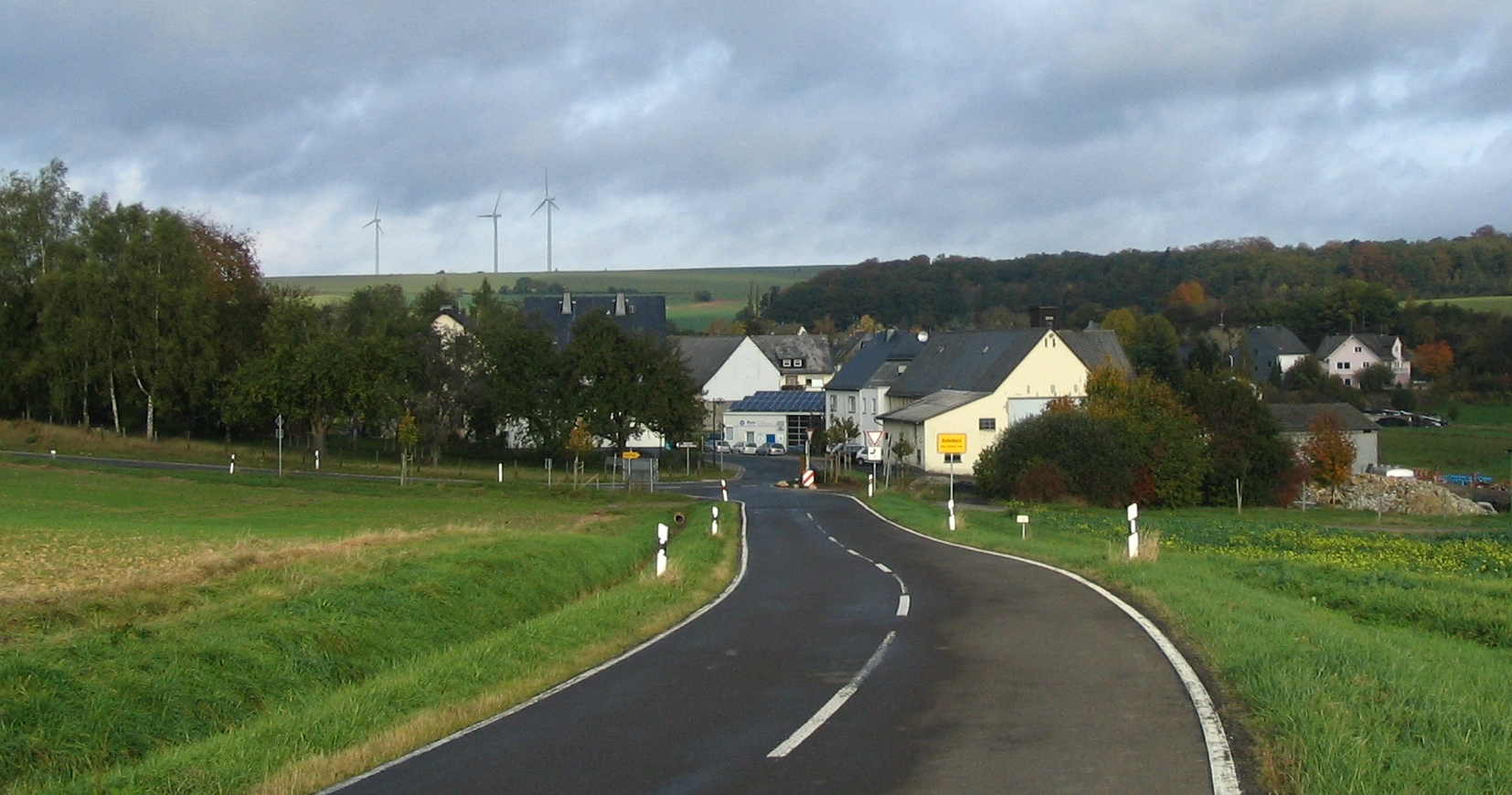
Budenbach seen from the south

Budenbach is an Ortsgemeinde – a municipality belonging to a Verbandsgemeinde, a kind of collective municipality – in the Rhein-Hunsrück-Kreis (district) in Rhineland-Palatinate, Germany. It belongs to the Verbandsgemeinde Simmern-Rheinböllen, whose seat is in Simmern.

== Geography ==
=== Location ===
The municipality lies in the central Hunsrück in the upper Simmerbach valley. Through the village itself flows the Klingelbach.

== History ==
Four Roman barrows from the 2nd century AD make it clear that the Romans had settled here by that time. The grave goods yielded up by these mounds, such as glass urns, jugs, dishes and beakers, are now kept at the Hunsrückmuseum in Simmern.

In 1293, Budenbach had its first documentary mention. The village was held first by the Duchy of Palatinate-Simmern and then, as of 1673, by Electoral Palatinate. Beginning in 1794, Budenbach lay under French rule. In 1815 it was assigned to the Kingdom of Prussia at the Congress of Vienna. Since 1946, it has been part of the then newly founded state of Rhineland-Palatinate.

== Politics ==
=== Municipal council ===
The council is made up of 6 council members, who were elected by majority vote at the municipal election held on 7 June 2009, and the honorary mayor as chairman.

== Culture and sightseeing ==
=== Buildings ===
The following are listed buildings or sites in Rhineland-Palatinate's Directory of Cultural Monuments:

- On Kreisstraße 41 – graveyard; sandstone graveyard cross; warriors' memorial, pylon with relief
