= Bundesautobahn 573 =

Federal motorway in Germany

A 573
- Bundesautobahn 573

Route information
- Length: 3 km (1.9 mi)

Location
- Country: Germany
- States: Rhineland-Palatinate

Highway system
- Roads in Germany; Autobahns; List; Federal; List; State; E-roads

Bundesautobahn 573 (translates from German as Federal Motorway 573, short form Autobahn 573, abbreviated as BAB 573 or A 573) is an autobahn in Germany. It leads from the A 61 through Bad Neuenahr and ends behind Bad Neuenahr at a provisional connection. The extension to Linz am Rhein with a bridge is planned, but will be realized as the Bundesstraße 266.

The A 573 was originally planned as the southern end of the A 31.

== Exit list ==
(1)	Bad Neuenahr-Ahrweiler 3-way interchange A 61
	Talbrücke Karweiler 300 m
(2)	Bad Neuenahr B 266 B 267
(0)	provisional connection
