= Bundesautobahn 10 =

Federal motorway in Germany

A 10
- Bundesautobahn 10
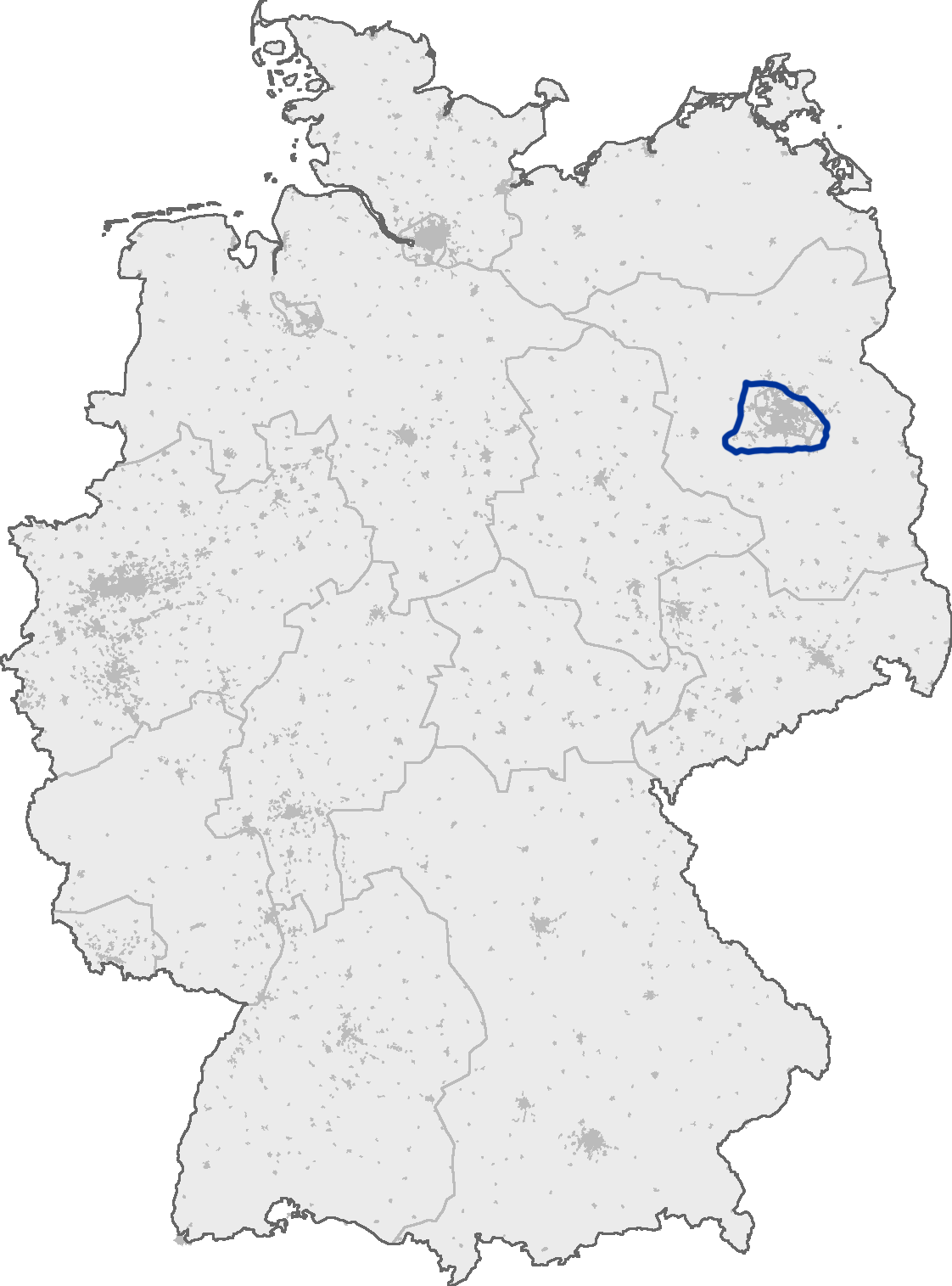
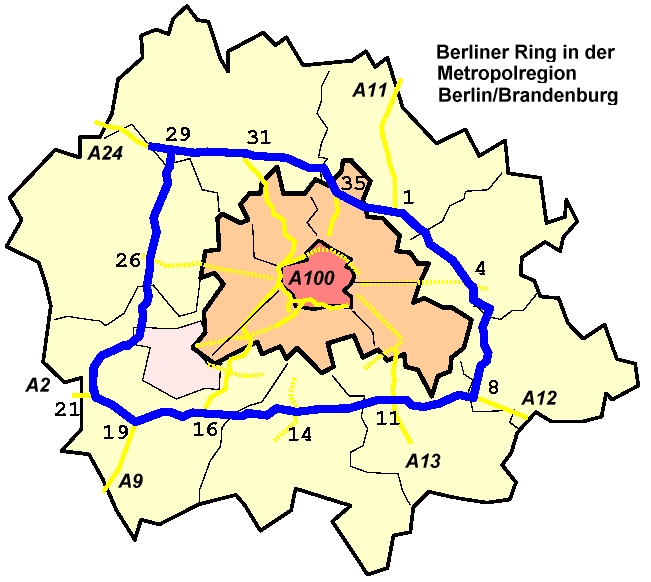
- Map of Berlin (A 10 highlighted)

Route information
- Length: 196 km (122 mi)

Major junctions
- Beltway around Berlin
- A 11 in Kreuz Barnim; A 12 E30 in Grünheide; A 13 A 113 E55 in Schönefelder Kreuz; A 9 in Potsdam; A 2 E30 in Dreieck Werder; A 24 E26 E55 in Dreieck Havelland

Location
- Country: Germany
- States: Berlin, Brandenburg

Highway system
- Roads in Germany; Autobahns; List; Federal; List; State; E-roads
← A 9	→ A 11

Bundesautobahn 10 (translates from German as Federal Motorway 10, short form Autobahn 10, abbreviated as BAB 10 or A 10) is an orbital motorway around the German capital city of Berlin. Colloquially called Berliner Ring (Berlin Beltway), it is predominantly located in the state of Brandenburg, with a short stretch of 5 km (3 miles) in Berlin itself. It should not be confused with the Berliner Stadtring (Bundesautobahn 100) around Berlin's inner city.

With a total length of 196 km (122 miles), the BAB 10 is the longest orbital in continental Europe (Route 1 in Iceland is 1,322 km (821 mi)). The BAB 10 is 8 km (5 miles) longer than the M25 motorway around London.

== Course ==
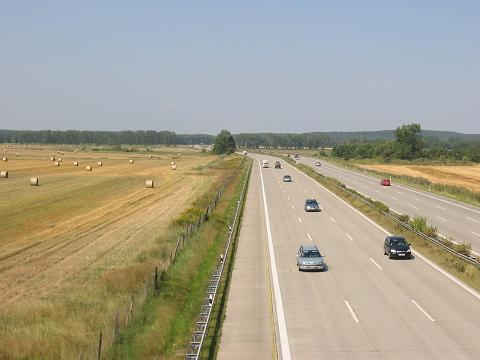
Berliner Ring between Ludwigsfelde and Nuthetal interchange

The highway route markers run clockwise from the interchange at Schwanebeck (the former Prenzlau branch-off), where the Bundesautobahn 11 runs to Szczecin, Poland via the Pomellen/Kołbaskowo border crossing and the Polish A6 autostrada. From here the beltway leads southwards to the Spreeau interchange with the Bundesautobahn 12 to Frankfurt (Oder) and the Polish A2 autostrada. At the Schönefeld four-way interchange, the Bundesautobahn 13 leads to Dresden and the Bundesautobahn 113 to the Berliner Stadtring and the Berlin city centre via Berlin Brandenburg Airport.

The Berliner Ring then runs westwards to Nuthetal, where the Bundesautobahn 115 (including the former AVUS race track) also links to the Stadtring at the Funkturm Berlin. Next the Bundesautobahn 9 leads to Munich (at the Potsdam interchange) and the Bundesautobahn 2 to the Ruhr area (at Werder). From here the beltway runs northwards to the Dreieck Havelland interchange with the Bundesautobahn 24 to Hamburg, and finally turns eastwards to the Oranienburg and Pankow interchanges with the Bundesautobahn 111 and Bundesautobahn 114 motorways both leading to the Berliner Stadtring. It again reaches Schwanebeck at km 196.

The beginning and end of the kilometer is the cross Barnim, which until 2013 Dreieck Schwanebeck was called. From there, the A11 from Szczecin / Prenzlau joins the A10. In the direction of the kilometering (clockwise), the A12 leads from the outside at the triangle Spreeau, at the junction Schoenefeld the A13, at the triangle Potsdam the A9, at the triangle Werder the A 2 and at the triangle Havelland the A 24 in the Berliner Ring. The highway is connected to the Berliner Stadtring (A 100) and other parts of Berlin via the A 111 (Oranienburg), A 114 (Pankow), A 113 (Kreuz Schönefeld) and A 115 (Nuthetal), the northern part is called AVUS known), which open from the inside into the ring. The junctions Ludwigsfelde-Ost and Berlin-Spandau as well as the Oranienburg cross lead to motorway-like developed federal highways.

== History ==
The first sections near Werder, Schwanebeck and Spreeau were opened between 1936 and the outbreak of World War II in 1939 as part of the Reichsautobahn program. Construction works were not resumed until 1972, when the East German authorities began to complete the orbital, in order to bypass West Berlin on the way from the capital East Berlin to Potsdam and the motorways leading to Magdeburg and Leipzig. The final stretch opened in 1979.

Year	From	To
1936	Dreieck Werder	Anschlussstelle Groß-Kreutz
1936	ehem. Anschlussstelle Weißensee	Autobahndreieck Barnim
1937	Autobahndreieck Barnim	Dreieck Spreeau
1937	Anschlussstelle Michendorf	Dreieck Werder
1938	Dreieck Spreeau	Anschlussstelle Michendorf
1939	Anschlussstelle Groß-Kreutz	Anschlussstelle Potsdam-Nord

Those that are built from 1972 to 1979:

Year	From	To
1972	Dreieck Havelland	Anschlussstelle Birkenwerder
1973	Anschlussstelle Birkenwerder	Dreieck Pankow
1974	Dreieck Pankow	ehem. Anschlussstelle Weißensee
1979	Anschlussstelle Potsdam-Nord	Dreieck Havelland

In the section between the former Berlin-Weißensee junction and the Berlin-Spandau interchange, the freeway completed today does not follow the original route.

East of today's triangle Pankow (A 114) on the B 109 the junction Pankow-Wandlitz should be created. From there, the projected route between the villages of Mühlenbeck and Schildow ran through to the planned Nordkreuz, which was to be built around one kilometer south of Schönfließ. It was planned to create a motorway interchange from the current A 11 south of Lanke to the designated feeder road in Wittenau. In the further course, the connection points Reinickendorf-Oranienburg were planned on the B 96 south of the Invalidensiedlung in Reinickendorf and Tegel-Hennigsdorf south of Velten. From there, the proposed route followed essentially the present day Berlin railroad outer ring to the junction Spandau-Pausin on the L 16. Immediately south of today's Havel Canal was the Hamburg Cross projected. From the planned junction Heerstraße-Nauen on the B 5 (today's name: Berlin-Spandau), the Berliner Ring has been built up to the junction Potsdam-Nord on the original route.

== Planning ==
According to a press release by Brandenburg Transport Minister Jörg Vogelsänger on 1 February 2011, the motorway from the Junction Kremmen-South on the A 24 via the Havelland triangle to the Barnim cross in 2022 will be passable in six lanes. This relieves the busy northern Berliner Ring. At Oranienburg alone, 51,000 vehicles a day are on the road, just under a fifth of which are trucks. The total cost of the project is expected to total around 300 million euros.

In the course of expansion, the triangle Schwanebeck was redesigned into a motorway junction and renamed "Cross Barnim". The main roadway is now the Berliner Ring and not the direction of the northern Berliner Ring - A 11. The Berlin-Weißensee junction is omitted because of the immediate proximity to the motorway junction. Instead, the B 2 was transferred directly to the A 11 and at the same time the A 11 to 2.0 km fundamentally removed and rebuilt. The construction work began in the spring of 2010 with extensive clearing measures in the area of the motorway triangle Schwanebeck (construction plan) and the bridge construction between Weissensee and the triangle Pankow on the A 10. The groundbreaking ceremony for the conversion took place on 5 May 2011. After a construction period of 29 months, the motorway junction was officially handed over to traffic on November 11, 2013.

In July 2011, the planning approval decision for the six-lane expansion from the Neuruppin junction (A 24) to the junction Oberkrämer (A 10) including the reconstruction of the Havelland triangle was published. On 17 September 2012, the symbolic groundbreaking ceremony for the expansion of the section triangle Havelland Kremmen. Overall, it was expected to cost 52 million euros. The European Union contributed €18 million to the financing from the European Regional Development Fund. The developed section was put into operation on September 27, 2014. In addition, on 7 October 2015, the developed section of Berlin was opened to traffic.

The route between the triangle Nuthetal and the triangle Potsdam should be expanded eight-lane. The construction costs are estimated at around 123 million euros, the plan approval decision is available since January 2013. 61 additional truck parking spaces are planned for the Michendorf service area. The afforestation as a compensatory measure for the environment are now carried out close to local complaints, instead of as originally planned by Ribbeck or Thyrow, also the use of open-pored asphalt (whispering asphalt) at Michendorf has now been included in the planning. On the noise barriers to be built originally photovoltaic systems were planned with a capacity of about 7.5 MWp. The tendering procedure for the construction of these "solar noise barriers" started in September 2013 and a private investor was to be found for this purpose. This was to bear the costs of increasing the originally planned six to eight-meter-high noise barriers to about ten meters and recover the associated additional costs of marketing the solar power. After no investor found this, the project for the construction of the photovoltaic systems and the increase of the noise protection walls is considered as failed. The start of construction of the section took place with the official ground-breaking ceremony on March 31, 2016, the costs are now reported at 150 million euros.

The section between the triangle Werder and Groß Kreutz is to be expanded to six lanes. These measures are in the urgent need of the Federal Transport Infrastructure Plan. The replacement of the bridge over the Zernsee between the junctions Phöben and Leest has already been built six lanes, with currently only two lanes released in each direction. Furthermore, the six-lane extension between Groß Kreutz and Havelland is planned (further demand with planning rights). In the area of the Berlin-Spandau interchange, the overpass of the newly built Federal Highway 5 has already been prepared for the upcoming expansion, as well as the double bridge over the Havel Canal in the further course.

== Exit list ==
Legend:

- I/C - Interchange, I/S - Intersection, RSA - Rest and service area, OBR - Overhead bridge restaurant, R/R - Restaurant and rest plaza, L/B - Layby, V/P - Vista point, TN - tunnel, T/P - Toll plaza, BR - Bridge
- C - Cloverleaf, S - Stack, T-A - Trumpet-A, T-B - Trumpet-B, DT - Directional-T/Y, SDT - Semi-Directional-T/Y, P-Y - Partial-Y, D - Diamond, P-C - Partial cloverleaf, D-D - Diverging diamond, D-R - Direct ramp

State	District	Municipality	km	mi	Exit	Name	Destinations	Notes
Brandenburg	Barnim	Panketal	195.8; 0.0		1	Dreieck Barnim	A 11 / E28 / B 2 – Szczecin (PL), Prenzlau, Weißensee, Schwanebeck	
Brandenburg	Barnim	Bernau bei Berlin	No major junctions					
Brandenburg	Barnim	Ahrensfelde	3.6		2	Berlin-Hohenschönhausen	B 158 – Hohenschönhausen, Blumberg, Bad Freienwalde	
Brandenburg	Märkisch-Oderland	Hoppegarten	No major junctions					
Brandenburg	Märkisch-Oderland	Altlandsberg	10.9		3	Berlin-Marzahn	Marzahn, Altlandsberg, Strausberg	
Brandenburg	Märkisch-Oderland	Neuenhagen bei Berlin	12.3		TR	Seeberg		
Brandenburg	Märkisch-Oderland	Fredersdorf-Vogelsdorf	18.7		4	Berlin-Hellersdorf	B 1 / B 5 – Hellersdorf, Berlin-Zentrum, Strausberg, Müncheberg	
Brandenburg	Märkisch-Oderland	Rüdersdorf bei Berlin	21.6		5	Rüdersdorf	Rüdersdorf, Woltersdorf, Schöneiche	
Brandenburg	Märkisch-Oderland	Rüdersdorf bei Berlin	24.8		PWC	Kalkberge		Counterclockwise direction only
Brandenburg	Oder-Spree	Woltersdorf	27.0		PWC	Kranichberge		Clockwise direction only
Brandenburg	Oder-Spree	Erkner	28.6		6	Erkner	Erkner, Köpenick, Grünheide (Mark), AM Erkner	
Brandenburg	Oder-Spree	Erkner	32.5		7	Freienbrink	Freienbrink, GVZ Freienbrink, Hangelsberg	
Brandenburg	Oder-Spree	Gosen-Neu Zittau	No major junctions					
Brandenburg	Oder-Spree	Spreenhagen	40.5		8	Dreieck Spreeau	A 12 / E30 – Warsaw (PL), Frankfurt (Oder)	
Brandenburg	Dahme-Spreewald	Königs Wusterhausen	43.2		PWC	Uckleysee		Clockwise direction only
Brandenburg	Dahme-Spreewald	Königs Wusterhausen	43.3		PWC	Lankensee		Counterclockwise direction only
Brandenburg	Dahme-Spreewald	Königs Wusterhausen	46.4		9	Niederlehme	Niederlehme, Zernsdorf, Königs Wusterhausen port	
Brandenburg	Dahme-Spreewald	Wildau and Zeuthen	50.5		10	Königs Wusterhausen	B 179 – Königs Wusterhausen, Wildau, A10 Center	
Brandenburg	Dahme-Spreewald	Schönefeld	54.0		11	Schönefelder Kreuz	A 13 / A 113 / E36 / E55 – Dresden, Cottbus, Berlin-Zentrum, Berlin Brandenburg Airport	
Brandenburg	Dahme-Spreewald	Mittenwalde	58.0-58.2		TR	Am Fichtenplan		
Brandenburg	Teltow-Fläming	Rangsdorf	No major junctions					
Brandenburg	Teltow-Fläming	Blankenfelde-Mahlow	61.4		12	Rangsdorf	B 96 – Rangsdorf, Zossen, Dahlewitz, Tempelhof, AM Rangsdorf, FM Rangsdorf	
Brandenburg	Teltow-Fläming	Rangsdorf	No major junctions					
Brandenburg	Teltow-Fläming	Blankenfelde-Mahlow	66.9		PWC	Jünsdorfer Heide		Clockwise direction only
Brandenburg	Teltow-Fläming	Ludwigsfelde	70.7		13	Genshagen	Genshagen	
Brandenburg	Teltow-Fläming	Ludwigsfelde	72.5		14	Ludwigsfelde-Ost	B 101 – Ludwigsfelde, Teltow, GVZ Großbeeren, Industriewerke Ludwigsfelde, Luckenwalde	
Brandenburg	Teltow-Fläming	Ludwigsfelde	78.2		15	Ludwigsfelde-West	Ludwigsfelde	
Brandenburg	Teltow-Fläming	Ludwigsfelde	79.1		PWC	Schieferberg		Counterclockwise direction only
Brandenburg	Teltow-Fläming	Ludwigsfelde	79.9		PWC	Siethener Elsbruch		Clockwise direction only
Brandenburg	Teltow-Fläming	Nuthetal	No major junctions					
Brandenburg	Potsdam-Mittelmark	Michendorf	86.8		16	Dreieck Nuthetal	A 115 / E51 – Berlin-Zentrum, Zehlendorf, Potsdam-Zentrum	
Brandenburg	Potsdam-Mittelmark	Michendorf	90.9		17	Michendorf	B 2 – Michendorf, Potsdam, Beelitz, ST Michendorf	
Brandenburg	Potsdam-Mittelmark	Michendorf	91.5-91.7		TR	Michendorf		
Brandenburg	Potsdam-Mittelmark	Seddiner See and Schwielowsee	94.5		18	Ferch	Ferch, Neuseddin	
Brandenburg	Potsdam-Mittelmark	Schwielowsee	98.9		19	Dreieck Potsdam	A 9 / E51 – Munich, Leipzig	
Brandenburg	Potsdam-Mittelmark	Schwielowsee	102.2		20	Glindow	Glindow, Werder (Havel), Klaistow	
Brandenburg	Potsdam-Mittelmark	Schwielowsee	103.7		PWC	Caputh		Clockwise direction only
Brandenburg	Potsdam-Mittelmark	Werder (Havel)	104.2		PWC	Schwielowsee		Counterclockwise direction only
Brandenburg	Potsdam-Mittelmark	Kloster Lehnin	107.8		21	Dreieck Werder	A 2 / E30 – Hannover, Magdeburg	
Brandenburg	Potsdam-Mittelmark	Werder (Havel)	114.3		22	Groß Kreutz	B 1 – Groß Kreutz, Brandenburg an der Havel, Werder (Havel), Potsdam, AM Werder	
Brandenburg	Potsdam-Mittelmark	Werder (Havel)	119.9		23	Phöben	Phöben, Werder (Havel)	
Brandenburg	Potsdam-Mittelmark	Werder (Havel)	121.1		P			Clockwise direction only
Brandenburg	Potsdam-Mittelmark	Werder (Havel)	122.8		24	Leest	Leest, Töplitz	
Brandenburg	Potsdam		127.5		25	Potsdam-Nord	B 273 – Potsdam, Marquardt, Ketzin/Havel	
Brandenburg	Havelland	Wustermark	133.2-134.3		P			
Brandenburg	Havelland	Wustermark	136.9		26	Berlin-Spandau	B 5 – Spandau, Berlin-Zentrum, Falkensee, Wustermark, Nauen	
Brandenburg	Havelland	Brieselang	139.0		27	Brieselang	Brieselang, GVZ Wustermark	
Brandenburg	Havelland	Nauen	144.1		28	Falkensee	Falkensee, GVZ Brieselang	
Brandenburg	Havelland	Nauen	145.6		P			Clockwise direction only
Brandenburg	Havelland	Schönwalde-Glien	149.7-152.0		T	Wolfslake		
Brandenburg	Oberhavel	Oberkrämer and Kremmen	155.0		29	Dreieck Havelland	A 24 / E26 / E55 – Hamburg, Rostock	
Brandenburg	Oberhavel	Oberkrämer	161.5		30	Oberkrämer	Oberkrämer, Velten	
Brandenburg	Oberhavel	Velten, Leegebruch, and Hohen Neuendorf	167.5		31	Dreieck Kreuz Oranienburg	A 111 / B 96 / E26 – Berlin-Zentrum, Reinickendorf, Stralsund, Oranienburg	
Brandenburg	Oberhavel	Birkenwerder	173.0		33	Birkenwerder	B 96 / E251 – Birkenwerder, Velten, AM Birkenwerder	
Brandenburg	Oberhavel	Hohen Neuendorf	176.0-176.4		P			
Brandenburg	Oberhavel	Mühlenbecker Land	180.2		34	Mühlenbeck	Mühlenbeck, Wensickendorf	
Brandenburg	Oberhavel	Mühlenbecker Land	181.3-181.6		P			
Brandenburg	Barnim	Wandlitz	No major junctions					
Brandenburg	Oberhavel	Mühlenbecker Land	No major junctions					
Brandenburg	Barnim	Wandlitz	185.9		35	Dreieck Pankow	A 114 – Berlin-Zentrum, Pankow	
			186.6		Brandenburg-Berlin state border			
Berlin			No major junctions					
			191.9		Berlin-Brandenburg state border			
Brandenburg	Barnim	Panketal	195.8; 0.0		1	Dreieck Barnim	A 11 / E28 / B 2 – Szczecin (PL), Prenzlau, Weißensee, Schwanebeck	

== See also ==
- List of motorways in Germany
- Périphérique (Paris)
- M25 motorway (London)
- Capital Beltway (Washington, DC)
- MKAD (Moscow)
- A10 motorway (Netherlands) (Amsterdam)
