= Schönefelder Kreuz =

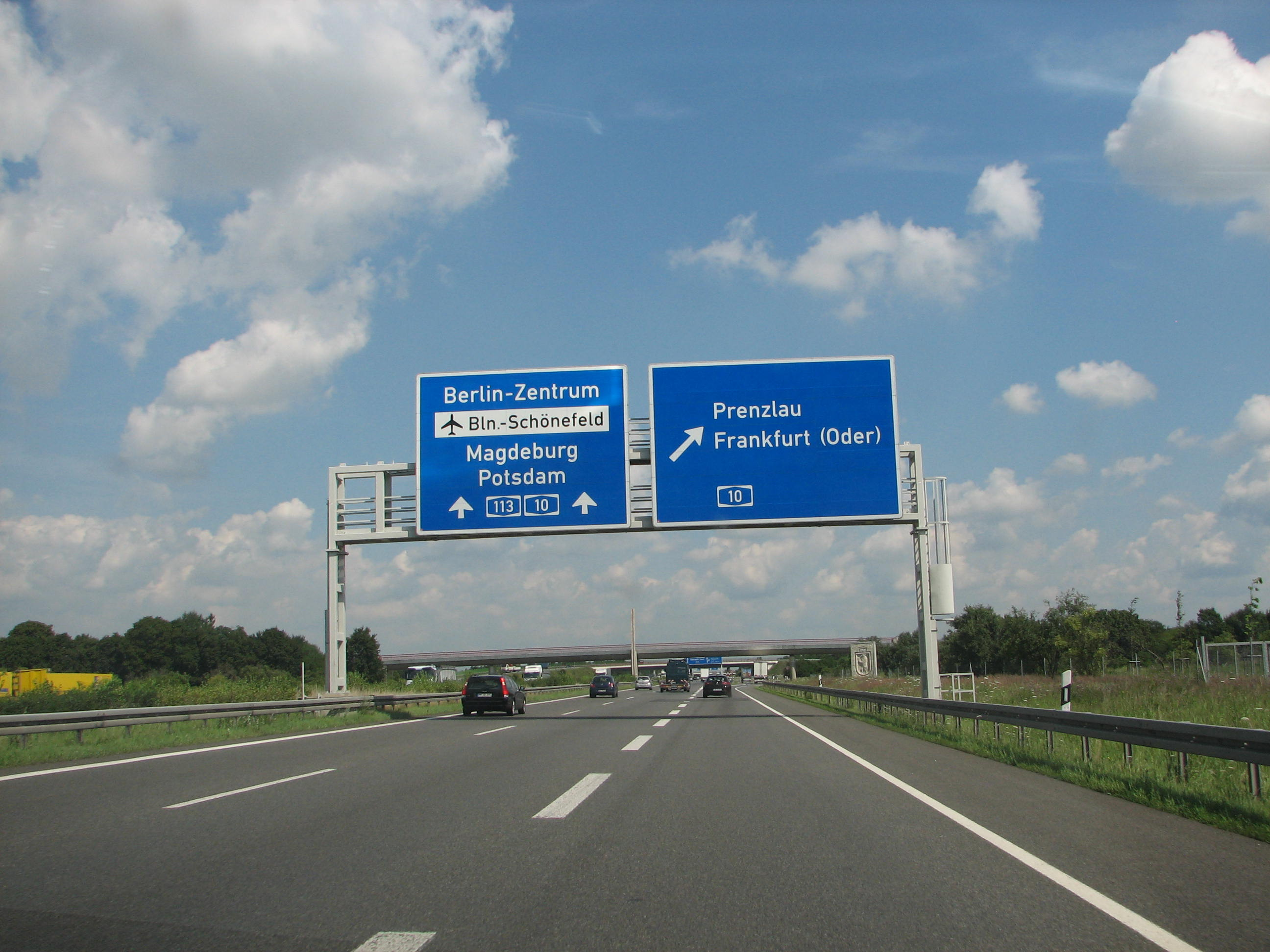

Location
- Schönefeld, Germany
- Coordinates: 52°19′9″N 13°33′16″E
- Roads at junction: A 13; A 10; A 113

Construction
- Type: Cloverleaf interchange with direct links
- Lanes: 2x3/2x3
- Opened: 1938 (last reconstruction between 1997-2001)

The Schönefelder Kreuz (also: Autobahnkreuz Schönefeld, short AK Schönefeld, or Kreuz Schönefeld) is a cloverleaf interchange, with a direct link Magdeburg-Berlin and also a direct link Frankfurt (Oder)-Dresden, in the German state of Brandenburg in the metropolitan region of Berlin-Brandenburg.

The interchange forms the connection between the A113 (Flughafenautobahn) coming from Berlin and the A13 coming from Dresden to the A10 (Berliner Ring), the Berlin Beltway.

== Geography ==
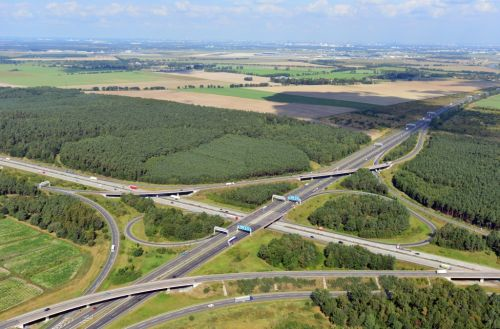
Areal of the Schönefelder Kreuz, September 2012

The interchange lies in the municipal areas of Mittenwalde and Schönefeld. The nearby cities and villages are Königs Wusterhausen, Zeuthen und Wildau. The nearby village districts are Kiekebusch and Diepensee of Schönefeld as well as Brusendorf and Ragow of Mittenwalde. The city Schönefeld, after which the interchange is named, lies approximately 10 km north of the interchange.

in 2008 the A113 was diverted to the east, so they could connect the road to the new Berlin Brandenburg Airport (BER) that, at the time was and still is under construction, to the A113. The new connection lies between the interchange and the old Berlin-Schönefeld Airport.

Near the interchange lies the national reserve Naturpark Dahme-Heideseen.

== History ==
The interchange opened in 1938 with the name Lausitzer Dreieck (later: Lausitzer Abzweig) as a trumpet interchange. Back then, the link towards Frankfurt–Dresden had a radius of 170 meters, so that the roadbed could have a gradient of 8 percent.

After the construction of the Berlin Wall a motorway was needed to connect the southwestern Berlin beltway with East Berlin, because all the other interchanges in the southern beltway were connections with motorways coming from West Berlin. This part of the motorway, nowadays part of the A113 and A117, had to be connected to the old interchange. In this way, the old trumpet interchange had to be reconstructed into a cloverleaf interchange. But the semi-direct connection Frankfurt–Dresden stayed intact and the new semi-direct link Dresden–Potsdam was newly built.

The reconstruction of the Schönefelder Kreuz in the 1990s ended as a Mixform; nowadays it looks like mix between a cloverleaf interchange and a turbine interchange but is categorized as a combination interchange. The north-west and the south-east are more safely built as direct links. The north-east and south-west connections still have the narrow bend layout.

== Building form and road layout near the interchange ==
Near the interchange the A13 has a 2x2 layout. The A10 has a 2x3 layout. The A 113 has seven lanes, four lanes towards Berlin, and three lanes towards the Schönefelder Kreuz. Both direct links have two lanes each and the old narrow bend connections both have one lane.

The interchange was built as a cloverleaf interchange with two direct links.

Both direct links first cross the A 10 and the A13 or A113 before the connection to the A 13 are the A 113.

== Traffic near the interchange ==
The Schönefelder Kreuz is used by 125,000 vehicles on a daily basis, which makes it one of the busiest interchanges in Brandenburg.

Manual traffic counts 2010
From	To	Average daily traffic	Percentage of heavy traffic
AS Königs Wusterhausen (A 10)	Schönefelder Kreuz	75,900	19.3 %
Schönefelder Kreuz	AS Rangsdorf (A 10)	66,200	25.7 %
Schönefelder Kreuz	AS Ragow (A 13)	45,600	13.3 %
Schönefelder Kreuz	Waltersdorfer Dreieck (A 113)	65,100	7.8 %
