= Bundesautobahn 100 =

Federal motorway in Germany

A 100
- Bundesautobahn 100

Route information
- Length: 24 km (15 mi)
- Existed: 1958–present

Location
- Country: Germany
- States: Berlin

Highway system
- Roads in Germany; Autobahns; List; Federal; List; State; E-roads
← A 99	→ A 103

Bundesautobahn 100 (translates from German as Federal Motorway 100, short form Autobahn 100, abbreviated as BAB 100 or A 100) is an Autobahn in Germany.

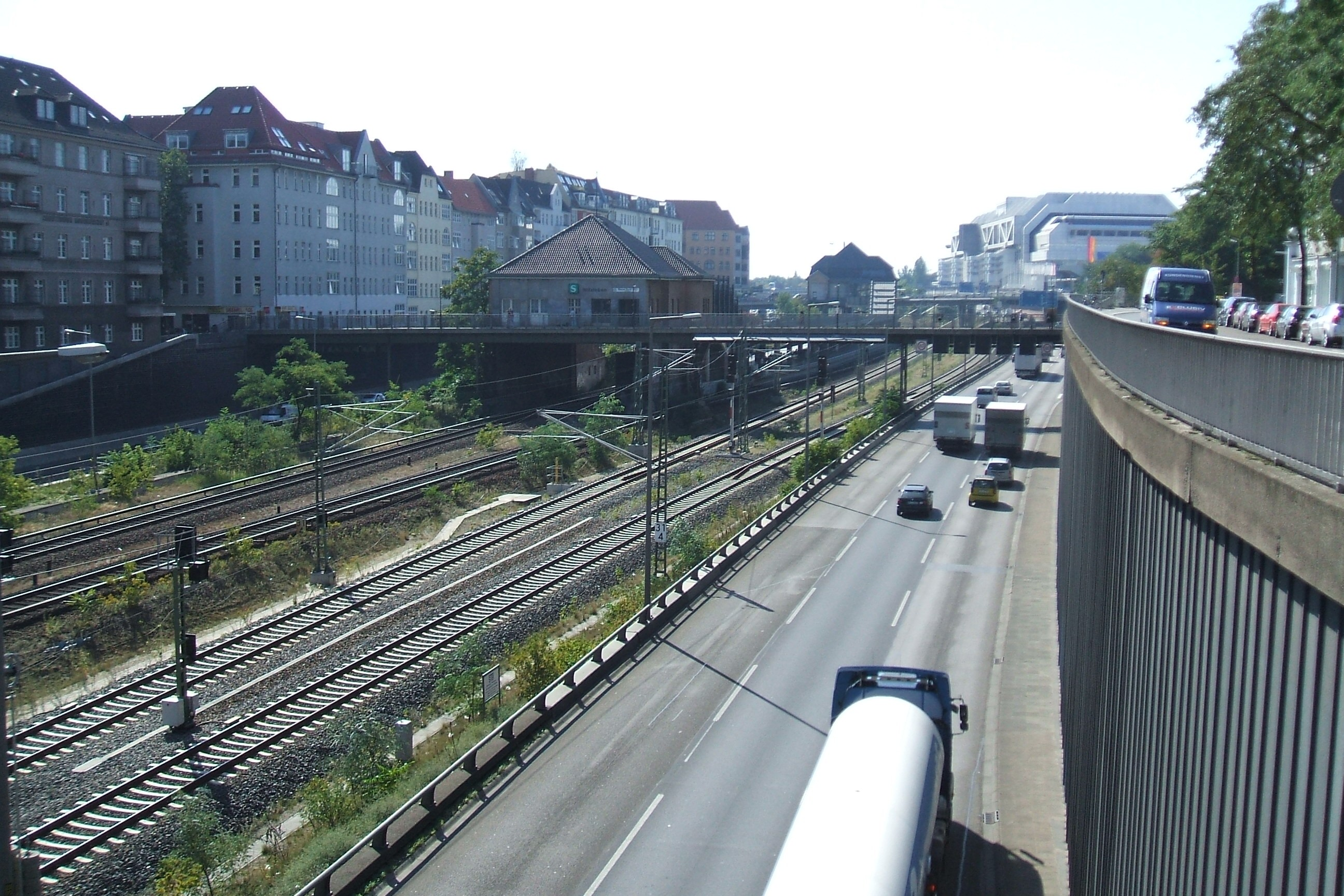
A 100 with Ringbahn tracks

The A 100 partially encloses the city centre of the German capital Berlin, running from the Wedding district of the Berlin-Mitte borough in a southwestern arc through Charlottenburg-Wilmersdorf and Tempelhof-Schöneberg to Neukölln. It connects with the Bundesautobahn 111 (A 111) at the Charlottenburg interchange, with the A 115 (the former AVUS) at the Funkturm junction, and finally reaches the A 113 at its southeastern terminus in Neukölln, all linking it with the outer Berliner Ring A 10. The route in most parts runs parallel to the tracks of the inner circle line (Ringbahn) of the Berlin S-Bahn.

The first section at western Kurfürstendamm was opened in 1958. According to the concept of a "car-friendly" city, the A 100 was then intended to become a ring road, but today a completion of the ring as an autobahn is no longer proposed. It is nonetheless still often called Stadtring ("city ring"). The section between the Funkturm and Kurfürstendamm interchanges is the busiest autobahn in Germany, with an average of 191,400 vehicles per day. Recently a southeastern extension to Sonnenallee and Treptower Park, finished in 2025, had been the target of various protests. The next eastern extension to Frankfurter Allee and Storkower Street in Friedrichshain has started to be built.

== History ==
The Federal Highway 100 had been planned as the centerpiece of a West Berlin motorway network; the semi-circular structure was to be extended to a full ring in the event of German reunification. However after reunification, city planners backed away from the full ring concept, as it would impose severe urbanistic side effects.

Before the introduction of the current numbering system, the number A 53 had been assigned to this motorway for some time. In 1975, the designation changed to A 10 and after reunification, the current designation A 100 was introduced, while the outer Berlin Ring was assigned the A 10 designation.

The motorway was opened to traffic in the following sections:

Year	From	To	Notes
1958	AS Kurfürstendamm	AS Hohenzollerndamm	
1960	AS Hohenzollerndamm	Provisional AS Detmolder Straße	
1961	AD Funkturm	AS Hohenzollerndamm	
1962	AD Charlottenburg	AS Kaiserdamm-Süd	
1963	AS Kaiserdamm-Süd	AD Funkturm	
1969	AS Detmolder Straße	AS Wexstraße	
1973	AS Seestraße	AS Jakob-Kaiser-Platz	
1976	AK Schöneberg	Provisional AS Sachsendamm	
1978	AS Wexstraße	AK Schöneberg	
1979	AD Charlottenburg	AS Jakob-Kaiser-Platz	
1981	AS Alboinstraße	AS Gradestraße	Planned as Kreuz Tempelhof
1987	Provisional AS Suadicanistraße	AS Alboinstraße	
1996	Provisional AS Sachsendamm	Provisional AS Suadicanistraße	Elimination of both provisional connection points
2000	AS Gradestraße	AS Buschkrugallee	Section 14 – Britz tunnel
2004	AS Buschkrugallee	AS Grenzallee	
2025	AS Grenzallee	AS Treptower Park	Section 16 -

=== Key ===
- AS: Anschlussstelle = (junction, with another type of road)
- AD: Autobahndreieck (Autobahn triangle, junction of three motorways)
- AK: Autobahnkreuz (where motorways cross)

The construction of what later became an Autobahn began in April 1956, with the first spade cut for the highway between Kurfürstendamm and Hohenzollerndamm. The routing of a ring road parallel to the Ringbahn was already provided for in the Hobrecht Plan of 1862, and in 1948 a freeway was included in the city planning corridor. On 4 July 1955 the Senate decided on a complete expressway ring, but the dedication as a highway did not happen until 1962. As it was planned as an urban expressway, the carriageways were initially narrower; the regulations provided for an overall width of 27 metres, with each lane 3.50 metres wide; and the junctions were closer together than is usual for an Autobahn. For example, near the Funkturm motorway triangle there is today a complex cluster of bridges, tunnels and exits, in a stretch of only a few hundred metres. This includes the 212-meter-long tunnel under the Rathenauplatz, opened in November 1958. The route also goes under the railway lines leading to Westkreuz station, and connects at the Funkturm Triangle with the AVUS which had existed since 1921, and hence with Autobahn A115.

The Rudolf Wissell Bridge was built between 1959 and 1962. It stretches in a 930 metre arc over the tracks of the Berlin-Hamburg Railway and the Berlin-Lehrter Bahn as well as the Charlottenburger Spree river. It is the longest bridge in Berlin. Some of the connecting roads of the Charlottenburg motorway intersection are on the bridge itself; the Siemensdamm exit on one of the connecting curves is on the left side. The gap between the Charlottenburg-North triangle and AVUS and Halensee was closed on 20 December 1963 with the connection to the Funkturm triangle. The section to the junction Hohenzollerndamm junction towards Halensee was connected in 1961 to the emerging triangle.

The further expansion then follows the land use plan in 1965, which provided a west tangent through the city. The southern part was extended to the motorway junction Schöneberg - the intersection with the section A 103 of the west tangent. In the northern part of the ring road was extended to the junction Seestraße - just before the planned intersection with the section A 105 of the West Tangent, but even this point never reached.

The semi-ring, which was created until 1979, would have resulted in a complete enclosure of the West Berlin city with motorways with a western tangent through the Tiergarten. However, the further construction of the west tangent A 103 as a motorway did not take place. The construction of the tunnel Tiergarten Spreebogen in the same corridor took place from 1995 as a city street without crossing, which also has no connection to the originally planned crossroads.

There are some special features on the southern branch. For example, the junction Schmargendorf as Wilmersdorf interchange with the section of the A 104 to Steglitz was built - both were downgraded as parts of a feeder to the A 100 in the course of the 2005 conversions, so that the long flyover connection ramps act unusually spacious. In 1974, the footbridge "High Arch" was added to this cross, the name of which was self-evident. The provisional exit Detmolder road led to the Detmold road parallel to today's highway - this was preserved as an exit, with the further construction of the highway then two more ramps, which end behind the old ramps at Heidelberger Platz, so that they traffic like two in each other intertwined half connection points with the same name. In the course of the car-friendly city, the intersecting Bundesallee was equipped with several tunnels in the 1960s, but this high-performance axle does not have its own connection to the ring road, but is reached via the exits and driveways Detmolder road west and the exit Wexstraße east. The tunneling of the Innsbrucker Platz took a very long time from 1971 to 1979, whereby a complete connection point was created, which opens up important city centers via Martin-Luther-Straße and Hauptstraße / Potsdamer Straße. The ramps of the Wexstraße half-access point are integrated into the building at Innsbrucker Platz, with additional connecting routes between Wexstrasse ramparts and Innsbrucker Platz. To this accumulation and entwining of ramps is added that the lanes of the entrances and exits Innsbrucker Platz and the following Schöneberger cross merge into each other.

In the northern branch of the Jakob-Kaiser-Platz under the motorway junction Charlottenburg a special function. The rebuilt city ring was connected to the square in 1973, the gap closing over this away was only in 1979. The square continues to take over the gap in the ring road continues the lack of connection to the A 111 and at the same time connects the traffic axis Siemens dam / Nonnendammallee. In rush hour traffic, the short driveway Siemensdamm is often blocked at the triangle, and the traffic out of this traffic axis over the square away, and then to use the following driveway to the ring road. merge.

=== 12th phase ===
The 12th construction phase included the construction of the completed motorway junction Schoeneberg (West Tangent) to the proposed motorway junction Tempelhof (Osttangente). This construction phase was planned from 1972, the actual construction took place however only decades later.

During the construction of the Schöneberg motorway junction, the Anhalter Bahn was crossed to the west, as well as parallel road connections. For this purpose, the 260-meter tunnel of the Innsbrucker Platz and the Ringbahn was built, and the Innsbrucker Platz exit is integrated into the tunnel. On the eastern side of the motorway junction was then again a Untertunnelung a railway line provided. Because the route thereby carried out under the already closed interlocking Tpa the Dresden railway, negotiations were begun with the German Reichsbahn, the then owner of the operating rights (indirectly the GDR), which, however, remained inconclusive. The planning came to a halt in 1974, because the GDR wanted to agree to the demolition of the old railway bridges only if the Senate paid a new freight yard - ten years later, the negotiations broke off completely.

As a result, a provisional junction Sachsendamm was made at the end of the motorway junction, and used parallel to the later highway running Sachsendamm as bypass. This section formed from 1972 to 1996 a bottleneck, and due to the necessary traffic lights led to significant congestion ("longest parking lot in Berlin"). Due to the frequent mention in the traffic reports, the construction phase of the highway itself is also known as Sachsendamm, in the plan approval in 1992, however, it is named as a gap between the junctions Sachsendamm and Alboinstraße. After the German reunification offered new opportunities, the gap closure was pursued vigorously and in 1990 the old railway bridges were blown up. The 270-million-mark project was accelerated by additional funds so that a directional lane provisionally with four lanes in December 1995 went into operation. After reduction of the former ramps to the Sachsendamm and completion of the second directional lane the freeway was then completely opened in October 1996.

The completed highway passes under the railway line, whereby a 70-meter-wide concrete slab was made, since the railway at the start of construction in 1993 could not say how the tracks are supposed to lie, since it was not included in the previous planning. In addition, there are the Hermann Ganswindt Bridge (adjoining Möbel Höffner) to the east as the road bridge, then the August-Druckmüller Bridge, which carries the Sachsendamm, and finally the western Friedrich-Haak-Brücke (adjoining IKEA). Directly adjacent to the railway bridges, the Sachsendammsteg was also built as a pedestrian bridge leading to the Südkreuz train station. In addition, another ramp to the former semi-junction Alboinstraße completed - the fourth ramp is missing there and the access instead takes place via the single ramp from the Sachsendamm, which remained from the former provisional junction.

=== 13th phase ===
The construction section from Alboinstraße to Gradestraße was opened on 24 November 1981. The plans of 1965 still included the construction of a motorway intersection, but the preliminary work realized in 1981 included only a fork for a possible interchange Tempelhof. The fork was prepared so that the highway could be continued in high altitude, in the later realization, however, a low level was decided in a tunnel and the old ramps stopped again. However, the ramps to the interchange Gradestraße have been preserved - this junction itself divides to the exit in two lanes in order to leave room between them for the further construction as A 102, which has been omitted from the planning.

From the feeder road Gradestraße the lanes of the driveway lead directly into exit of the traffic lanes on the eastern side of the junction Oberlandstraße. Between the junctions Oberlandstraße and Tempelhofer Damm is the area of the former Tempelhof Airport, which has been accessible to the public for leisure activities since 2010 as Tempelhofer Feld. Due to the high altitude of the highway you can overlook the field. At the eastern end of the Tempelhof freight yard, a siding to supply a propane filling station (Geppert) was built across the motorway route. This track built in 1978 has not been used since the beginning of the 2000s because the filling station was closed. Until then, propane gas was delivered in pressurized gas tank cars. The lanes of the western ramps of the interchange Tempelhofer Damm then turn directly into the lanes of the junction Alboinstraße.

The provisional junction Suadicanistraße, which was additionally set up in 1987, was demolished during the construction of the previous section of the construction site on the Sachsendamm.

=== 14th phase ===
The tunnel district Britz (often tunnel local center Britz called) was built since 1995 and opened in July 2000. In the old planning the tunnel was supposed to be run as high way. Until the fall of the wall, however, was not thought of an execution. To divide the district Britz (in the narrower sense: Neubritz) not in two parts, the plans were changed, and the district with a tunnel under.

The construction section has ramps with a length of 2621 m, of which 1713 m account for the tunnels themselves. The tunnel has two tunnel tubes, each 14.50 m wide. Each tunnel tube includes a 12.50 m wide carriageway with three lanes (each 3.50 m), a hard shoulder (1.50 m) and two per meter wide elevated shoulder. The light building height is 4.90 m. For the traffic engineering equipment of the tunnel are reserved 40 cm under the blanket, so that a clear passage height of 4.50 m results. This height is monitored by means of an electronic height control at the entrances. Other tunnels include a constantly-available median strip transfer system so that one of the two tubes can be closed off and traffic flows through a tube in both directions. Within the tunnel, the semi-junction Britzer Damm leads eastwards into the district. Above it is the Carl Weder Park.

=== 15th phase ===
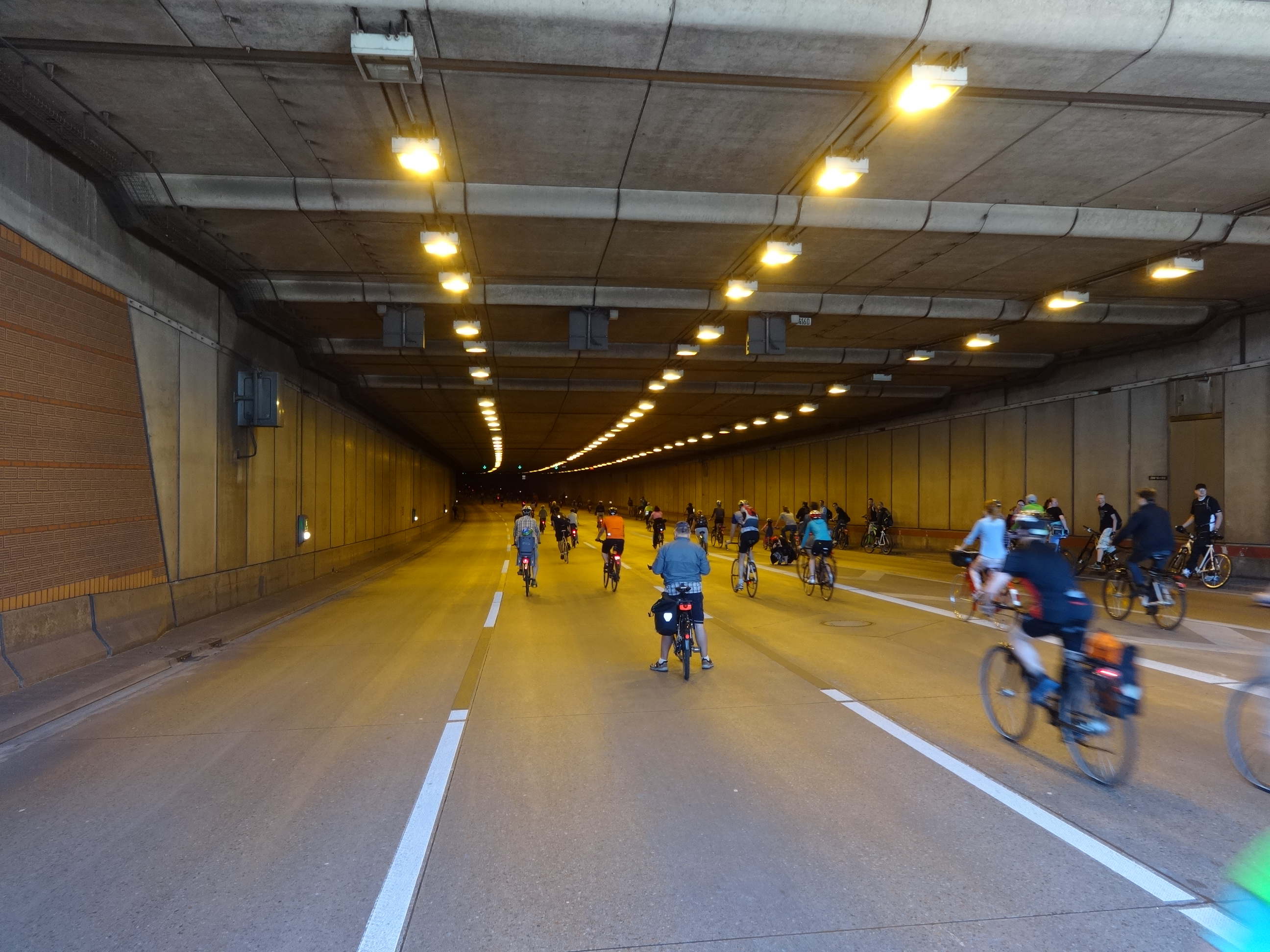
The tunnel at Britz

Starting from the center of the Britz tunnel, the middle main tracks of the A 100, with a two-lane swing, lead south to the A 113, which has been under construction since 1997. The subsequent northern section of the A 113 to Späthstraße was opened on 14 July 2004 together with the motorway junction Neukölln. Then the A 113 was extended, only in 2005 to Adlershof and following 2008 to Waltersdorf, resulting in a continuous route to the A 13 results.

For the further construction of the A 100, the outer ramps were designed with two lanes at the motorway junction. However, these led immediately at the end of the ramps in a curve on the provisional junction Grenzallee. As part of the construction work for section 16, the direct exit to Grenzallee was closed and an exit to a bypass built.

As a regular junction, additional ramps to the eastern side of the junction Buschkrugallee are built into the motorway junction. The western side of the junction are the tunnel accesses of the tunnel center Britz, which formed a half-junction until the opening of the triangle and the end of the A 100 were.

As a result of the planned further construction and the integration of the junction, the motorway junction consists of six bridges in four levels, each spanning the waters of the Neukölln shipping canal. The bridges lie between the port Britz-Ost and the harbor Neukölln.

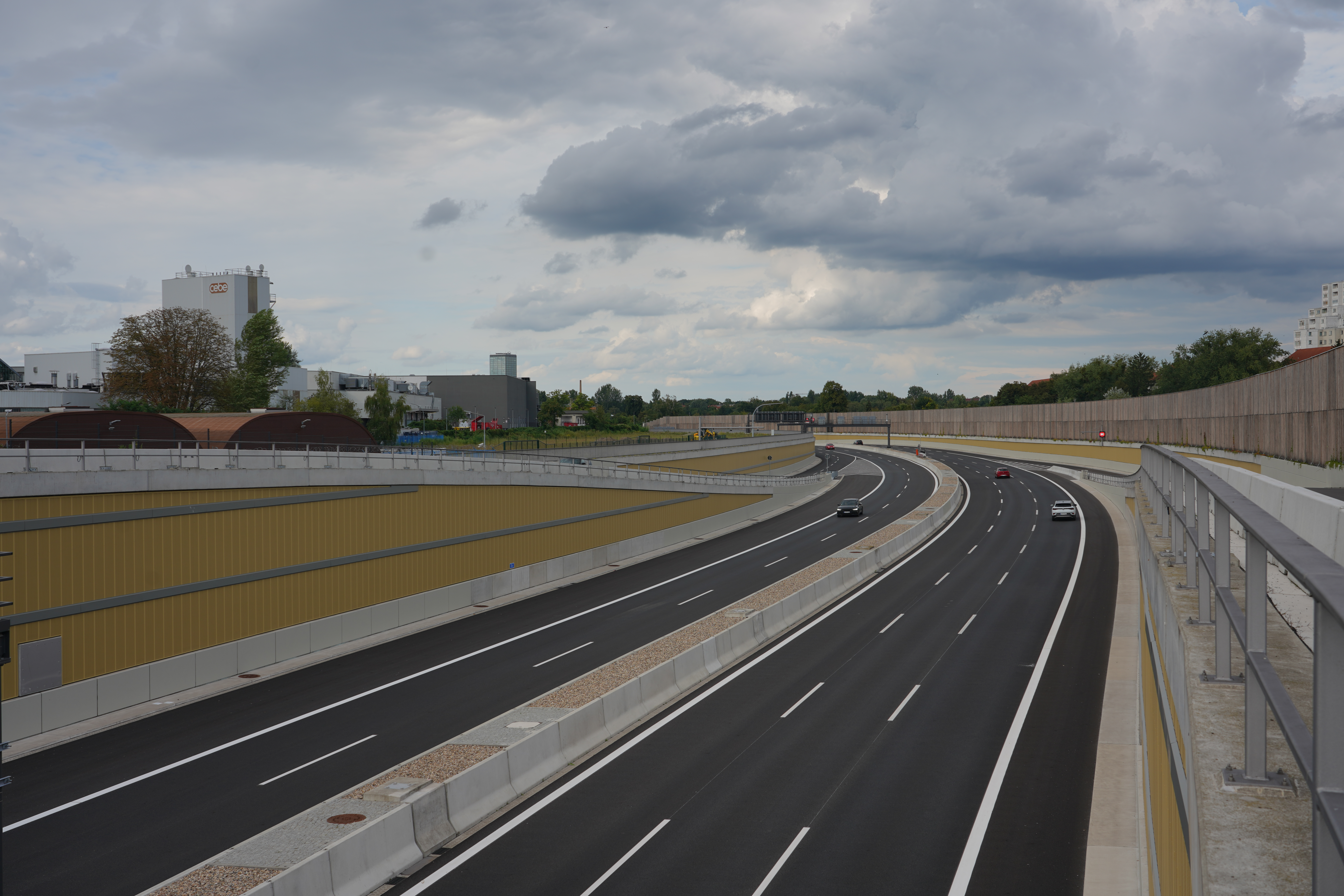
Autobahn between AS Grenzallee and AS Treptower Park

=== 16th phase ===
On August 27, 2025 the 16 section was opened from AS Grenzallee to AS Treptower Park in Berlin-Neukölln.

This 16 section is to run the motorway at the triangle Neukölln starting to the northeast and underpass in a tunnel the Grenzallee and the Neuköllnische avenue, then connect via a junction to the Sonnenallee and run in their further course parallel to the freight station Treptow before after passing under the Kiefholzstraße and the Ringbahn at the junction Am Treptower Park provisionally ends. In the construction of the multiplex cinema and the Park Center shopping center from 2000 to 2003, the area for the Treptower Park exit was left behind the building complexes.

The planning approval documents were drafted in March 2009 and a four-week public hearing on the objections was conducted at the end of 2009. In October 2012, the Federal Administrative Court dismissed the lawsuits against the further construction as far as possible, immediately after that began preparations for construction. On 8 May 2013, the ceremonial groundbreaking ceremony was carried out by the then Federal Transport Minister Peter Ramsauer (CSU) and Berlin's Transport Senator Michael Müller (SPD). The engineering structures are to be built from autumn 2013. The initial planning predicted the completion of the new section in 2021/2022. Construction costs were estimated at 417 million euros, plus land acquisition costs of 56 million euros.

Costs rose in part due to unexpected soil pollution and some unknown tunnels near the freight yard. The bridge for the circle line near Kiefholzstraße required a retendering which resulted in further delay. This 3.2 kilometer section finally opened August 27, 2025, at a cost of 720 million Euro, making it the most expensive stretch of highway ever constructed in Germany, at approximately €225,000 per metre (€69,000/ft).

== Further construction ==
=== Current developments ===
Following the motorway AS Am Treptower Park, the following section is planned as A 100:

- AS Am Treptower Park - AS Storkower Street (17th construction phase)

Any further possible closure of the motorway ring was eliminated from the Berlin land use plan.

The further construction of the A 100 is planned in one section. The planned BA 17 leads from AS Am Treptower Park there for the most part underground to the Storkower Straße, which is the planned final destination.

=== 17th phase ===
The time horizon for further construction (BA 17) is not foreseeable. Seven route variants for the construction up to the Frankfurter Allee were investigated and with a view to further construction phases beyond. The highway is to be led in this section to a large extent in a two-storey tunnel. The construction phase begins at the junction at Treptower Park, crosses the Spree and crosses the Ostkreuz to the north, and then continue to run underground along the Neue Bahnhofstraße / Gürtelstraße to the junction Frankfurter Allee. Originally, the construction phase should end there, according to an additional investigation to the Federal Transport Infrastructure Plan 2015, however, a plangleicher connection is provided to the north Storkower Street.

With the abolition of a complete motorway ring around the city center of Berlin, a possible 18th construction phase from the Frankfurter Allee no longer came to the planning stage. Since the existing Möllendorfstraße, which is located in natural extension of the route, can not absorb the entire outgoing traffic, was for the gap between the Frankfurter Allee and the city road ring (Ostseestraße / Michelangelostraße) still to be built city street between Frankfurter Allee and Storkower road along the Ring course proposed. As part of the regular review of the Federal Transport Infrastructure Plan, this conclusion was confirmed for the 17th construction phase. With the completion of the Federal Transport Infrastructure Plan at the end of 2015, the construction section will then be 4.1 kilometers long, instead of then 3.1 kilometers to Frankfurter Allee.

As a precautionary measure, trench walls are already being dug during the conversion of Ostkreuz station, creating concrete walls 1.2 m thick and 24 m deep in the ground. These are provided with a concrete ceiling of two meters thickness, on which then the station is formed. If the construction of the highway is started, then there is a constraint for the possible routes, where the tunnel must be located at Ostkreuz. The main costs incurred in the later tunnel construction then for the ramps and the sealing of the trough, since between Ostkreuz and river banks are only a few hundred meters.

The cost of this section was estimated in 1999 at 286.3 million euros (to Frankfurter Allee). An updated cost estimate in the course of the registration for the Federal Transport Infrastructure Plan 2015 now estimates this (as at the end of 2013) at €531.2 million. In addition to this demand, 16.3 million euros are already earmarked for the advance payments at Ostkreuz station.

Critics complain that due to the permanently increased pollution of the city center by nitrogen oxides and particulate matter above the permissible limits, as well as the manipulation scandals of the automotive industry, the planning approval procedures could become obsolete and inadmissible, so that a stop and the dismantling of the construction sites could be examined, to reduce the pollution of densely populated districts and traffic.

=== Bundesverkehrwegeplan 2030 ===
In the draft of the Federal Transport Infrastructure Plan 2030, the 16th and the 17th construction section were combined, so that both sections are considered as an overall project; it is referred to as a "running and fixed project (FD)", i. H. listed as a project of the highest level of urgency. The planning state in general and also differentiated z. For example, for nature conservation assessment or for spatial planning assessment, the draft of the Federal Transport Infrastructure Plan, like the majority of all projects, does not contain any information. The total distance is marked as "under construction"; However, construction work is currently only taking place between the junctions Grenzallee and Am Treptower Park. The total investment costs for the route AD Neukölln - Storkower Straße are 848.3 million euros

=== Controversy ===
Two citizen-led initiatives - BISS (citizen initiative Stadtring Süd) and the Action Alliance Stop A 100! - were founded as a reaction to the planned expansion. They organised numerous protests and demonstrations against the project. On April 19, 2009 a bicycle demonstration amassed 1,500 participants while a flash mob was held on June 21, 2010 at a crossroads by the Oberbaum Bridge. Other campaigns, such as those led by the Initiative Wirtschaft, supported the further development of the A100 project.

In the decision on the 16th construction phase, there was a dispute in the then red-red coalition in 2009: The Left Party was against the expansion and the SPD was at a party congress initially against, but later again for construction. The controversy over the expansion plans led on 5 October 2011 to a failure of the red-green coalition negotiations following the 2011 Chamber of Deputies.

Under the red-black coalition, the then Federal Transport Minister Peter Ramsauer took on 15 December 2011, the section in the investment framework 2011-2015. The construction was originally scheduled to begin in 2012 and be completed in 2016.

At the request of BUND and several private applicants, the Federal Administrative Court on 9 February 2012 banned the Berlin Senate Department for Urban Development by urgent decision to carry out preparatory measures for the extension of the A 100 motorway, in particular to expose parts of the route. [On 10 October 2012, the Federal Administrative Court dismissed the lawsuits against further construction.

The date for the beginning of the 17th construction phase remains unclear. The FDP, the AfD, the CDU and parts of the SPD want immediate further development. The Left and the Greens as well as various politicians from various parties and mayors of the affected districts express their resolve against the construction project. The construction section is classified as "under construction" by the current administration. [26] [30] The Senate presents a comprehensive concept for promoting cycling.

== Exit list ==
(1)	Seestraße
(2)	Beusselstraße
(3)	Jakob-Kaiser-Platz
	Goerdelerdamm-Brücke 570 m
(4)	Charlottenburg 3-way interchange A 111 E26
(5)	Siemensdamm
	Rudolf-Wissell Brücke 926 m
(6)	Spandauer Damm
	Bahnbrücke 250 m
(7)	Kaiserdamm B 2 B 5
(8)	Kaiserdamm-Süd B 2 B 5
	Bahnbrücke 200 m
(9)	Messedamm-Nord
	Services Avus
	Staßenbrücke 90 m
(10)	Funkturm 3-way interchange A 115 E51
(11)	Messedamm-Süd
(12)	Kurfürstendamm-Nord
	Tunnel Rathenauplatz 212 m
(12)	Kurfürstendamm-Süd
(13)	Hohenzollerndamm
(14)	Schmargendorf A 100 (ast)
	Hochstraße 690 m
(15)	Detmolder Straße
	Hochstraße 160 m
(16)	Wexstraße
(17)	Innsbrucker Platz (Westteil)
	Tunnel Innsbrucker Platz 264 m
(17)	Innsbrucker Platz (Ostteil)
(18)	Schöneberg 4-way interchange A 103 B 1
(19)	Alboinstraße (Westteil)
	Tunnel 80 m
(19)	Alboinstraße (Ostteil)
(20)	Tempelhofer Damm B 96
(21)	Oberlandstraße
(22)	Gradestraße A 100 (ast)
(23)	Britzer Damm
(24)	Buschkrugallee B 179
(25)	Neukölln 3-way interchange A 113
(26)	Grenzallee
	Tunnel Grenzallee 385 m
(27)	Sonnenallee
(28)	Am Treptower Park B 96a
	Spreebrücke (planned)
	Markgrafendamm (planned)
	Tunnel Ostkreuz 1000 m (planned)
	Frankfurter Allee (planned) B 1 B 5
	Storkower Straße (planned)
