= Dreieck Havelland =

Trumpet interchange in Brandenburg, Germany

- Autobahndreieck Havelland, AD Havelland

Location
- Oberkrämer, Kremmen, Germany
- Coordinates: 52°42′47″N 13°0′43″E
- Roads at junction: A 24; A 10

Construction
- Type: Directional T
- Lanes: 2x3/2x3
- Opened: 1979 (Reconstructed 2012-2014)

The Dreieck Havelland (German: Autobahndreieck Havelland, abbreviated AD Havelland) is a trumpet interchange in the German state of Brandenburg in the metropolitan region of Berlin.

The interchange connects the A24 coming from Hamburg to the A10, the Berlin-beltway.

== Geography ==
The interchange lies in the region of Havelland after which it is named, in the municipal area of Oberkrämer and Kremmen in the Landkreis Oberhavel. The nearby towns are Schönwalde-Glien und Nauen. It lies approximately 30 km northwest of the Berlin city centre.

== History ==
Dreieck Havelland was built as a trumpet interchange between 1972 and 1979, as they were extending the Berlin-beltway.

In July 2011, the plans were made to widen the road from junction Neuruppin (A24) to junction Oberkrämer (A10) into 2x3 lanes. Together with this plan they reconstructed the interchange. On 17 September 2012 the work not part Dreieck Havelland–Kremmen began.

The official opening of the interchange to traffic was on 18 November 2014.

== Traffic near the interchange ==
Manual traffic counts near the interchange in 2010:

| From | To | average traffic at the interchange | Percentage heavy traffic at the interchange |
|---|---|---|---|
| AS Falkensee (A 10) | AD Havelland | 28,500 | 16.5 % |
| AD Havelland | AS Oberkrämer (A 10) | 51,100 | 13.6 % |
| AS Kremmen (A 24) | AD Havelland | 48,200 | 14.1 % |

In 2025 they forecast 65,000 vehicles per day in every direction.
