= Bundesautobahn 115 =

Federal motorway in Germany

A 115
- Bundesautobahn 115

Route information
- Length: 28 km (17 mi)

Major junctions
- North end: A 100 in Berlin
- South end: A 10 in Michendorf

Location
- Country: Germany
- States: Berlin, Brandenburg

Highway system
- Roads in Germany; Autobahns; List; Federal; List; State; E-roads
← A 114	→ A 117

Bundesautobahn 115 (translates from German as Federal Motorway 115, short form Autobahn 115, abbreviated as BAB 115 or A 115) is an autobahn in Berlin, Germany. It connects the Berliner Stadtring with the Berliner Ring, using parts of the old AVUS race track. AVUS was opened in 1921 as Germany's first limited access road. After World War II, the A 115 served an important function as a transit road between West Berlin and West Germany. In 1969, a small part of the autobahn was moved eastwards by GDR authorities so that the Checkpoint Bravo border crossing at Dreilinden would be fully on West Berlin territory (previously, one would enter East German territory again briefly after passing the border check into West Berlin, which posed some problems for the East German regime).

From 1975 until reunification, the A 115 was known as the A 15.

While parts of today's A115 (the AVUS) were built before any other Autobahn in Germany, the AVUS wasn't used for public motorcar traffic until after the opening of what is today Bundesautobahn 555, which opened in 1932 and is the other claimant for "Germany's first limited access highway".

== Exit list ==
(1)	Funkturm 3-way interchange A 100 (Berliner Stadtring)
(2)	Hüttenweg
(3)	Spanische Allee
(4)	Zehlendorf 4-way interchange B 1
	Europarc Thyssen (planned)
(5)	Kleinmachnow
(6)	Potsdam-Babelsberg
(7)	Potsdam-Drewitz L40
(8)	Saarmund
(9)	Nuthetal 3-way interchange A 10 (Berliner Ring)
