= Bundesautobahn 114 =

Federal motorway in Germany

Coordinates: 52°36′29″N 13°26′58″E

A 114
- Bundesautobahn 114

Route information
- Length: 7 km (4.3 mi)

Major junctions
- North end: A 10 in Wandlitz
- South end: B 109 in Berlin

Location
- Country: Germany
- States: Berlin, Brandenburg

Highway system
- Roads in Germany; Autobahns; List; Federal; List; State; E-roads
← A 113	→ A 115

Bundesautobahn 114 (translates from German as Federal Motorway 114, short form Autobahn 114, abbreviated as BAB 114 or A 114) is a motorway in the north of the German capital Berlin. It connects the A 10 (Berliner Ring) starting at the Autobahndreieck Pankow over a seven kilometers distance to the main center of Berlin. The motorway was released for traffic between 1973 and 1982.

== Exit list ==
	(1)	Pankow 3-way interchange A 10 E55
		Bahnbrücke 60 m
	(2)	Schönerlinder Straße
	(3)	Bucher Straße
	(4)	Pasewalker Straße
		Bahnbrücke 330 m
	(5)	Prenzlauer Promenade
End of the motorway		End of the motorway
B 109		to Berlin
