= Bundesautobahn 12 =

Federal motorway in Germany, connecting Berlin with Poland

A 12
- Bundesautobahn 12

Route information
- Part of E30
- Length: 58 km (36 mi)

Major junctions
- West end: Berlin
- East end: Frankfurt (Oder); DK2 border with Poland

Location
- Country: Germany
- States: Brandenburg

Highway system
- Roads in Germany; Autobahns; List; Federal; List; State; E-roads
← A 11	→ A 13

Bundesautobahn 12 (translates from German as Federal Motorway 12, short form Autobahn 12, abbreviated as BAB 12 or A 12), also known as Autobahn der Freiheit (English: Motorway of Freedom) is an autobahn in northeastern Germany, connecting Berlin to the Polish border.

== Reason for the name ==
Poland lacked a symbolically significant event like the fall of the Berlin Wall and the subsequent opening of the border to commemorate the end of the People's Republic . The poor condition of many Polish roads was seen as a symbol of the socialist planned economy's shortages. Until 1989, and for years afterward, there were practically no expressways. Even the motorway to Warsaw only opened a few months before the 2012 European Football Championship . Thus, the new motorways became a symbol of the market economy and the connection with Western Europe. On June 4, 2014, the 25th anniversary of the 1989 Polish parliamentary elections, the Polish A2 motorway was given the honorary name "Motorway of Freedom " ( Polish: "Autostrada Wolności" ) at the initiative of Polish President Bronisław Komorowski . On October 9, 2014, the 25th anniversary of the Monday Demonstrations in Leipzig, Katherina Reiche, Brandenburg CDU Member of the Bundestag and Parliamentary State Secretary in the Federal Ministry of Transport and Digital Infrastructure, also bestowed the honorary name "Autobahn der Freiheit" (Motorway of Freedom ) upon the A12 .

== Exit list ==
State	District	Location	km	mi	Exit	Name	Destinations	Notes
Brandenburg	Oder-Spree	–	0.2	0.12	1	Spreeau interchange	A 10 / E30 / E55 – Magdeburg, Potsdam, Dresden, Berlin A 10 / E55 – Hamburg, Prenzlau	western endpoint of motorway
Brandenburg	Dahme-Spreewald	Friedrichshof	2.2	1.4	2	Friedersdorf	Friedersdorf	local road
Brandenburg	Oder-Spree	Spreenhagen	10.8	6.7	3	Storkow	Storkow, Spreenhagen	local road
Brandenburg	Oder-Spree	Markgrafpieske	14.5	9.0	Rest area	Lebbiner Heide / Briesenluch		Lebbiner Heide in direction to Frankfurt (Oder) Briesenluch in direction to Berlin parking with toilets
Brandenburg	Oder-Spree	Fürstenwalde	23.1	14.4	4	Fürstenwalde-West	Fürstenwalde, Bad Saarow	local road
Brandenburg	Oder-Spree	Langewahl	25.6	15.9	5	Fürstenwalde-Ost	B 169 – Fürstenwalde-Ost, Beeskow	
Brandenburg	Oder-Spree	–	33.5	20.8	Rest area	Kersdorfer See / Berliner Urstromtal		Kersdorfer See in direction to Frankfurt (Oder) Berliner Urstromtal in direction to Berlin parking with toilets
Brandenburg	Oder-Spree	Kersdorf	37.1	23.1	6	Briesen	Briesen (Mark)	local road
Brandenburg	Oder-Spree	Jacobsdorf	42.6	26.5	6	Müllrose	Müllrose, Petershagen	local road
Brandenburg	Oder-Spree	–	45	28	Rest area	Biegener Hellen		petrol station, restaurant, parking
Brandenburg	Frankfurt (Oder)	Frankfurt (Oder)	51	32	8	Frankfurt (Oder)-West	B 112 – Frankfurt (Oder)-West, Küstrin	
Brandenburg	Frankfurt (Oder)	Frankfurt (Oder)	54.1	33.6	9	Frankfurt (Oder)-Mitte	B 112 – Frankfurt (Oder)-Mitte, Eisenhüttenstadt	
Brandenburg	Frankfurt (Oder)	Frankfurt (Oder)	58.2	36.2	State border	Frankfurt (Oder)–Świecko former border crossing	DK 2 / E30 – Poznań, Warszawa	eastern endpoint of motorway; route follows as national road 2 in Poland Oder bridge
1.000 mi = 1.609 km; 1.000 km = 0.621 mi: Concurrency terminus; Proposed; Route transition
