= Bundesautobahn 113 =

Federal motorway in Germany

A 113
- Bundesautobahn 113

Route information
- Length: 19.1 km (11.9 mi)

Major junctions
- North end: A 100 in Berlin
- South end: A 10 / A 13 in Schönefeld

Location
- Country: Germany
- States: Berlin, Brandenburg

Highway system
- Roads in Germany; Autobahns; List; Federal; List; State; E-roads
← A 111	→ A 114

Bundesautobahn 113 (translates from German as Federal Motorway 113, short form Autobahn 113, abbreviated as BAB 113 or A 113) is a motorway in Germany. The motorway, located within Berlin, connects Neukölln (from the A 100) to Schönefeld (ends at the A 10). Its last segment opened on 23 May 2008.

The route of the motorway follows, in parts, the former Berlin Wall. The motorway was proposed in 1992 and began construction in 1997. The first segment opened in 2004, and the second segment opened in 2008.

== Exit list ==
(1)	Neukölln 3-way interchange A 100
(2)	Späthstraße
(3)	Johannisthaler Chaussee
(4)	Stubenrauchstraße
(5)	Adlershof
	Teltowkanalbrücke 149 m
	Tunnel Rudower Höhe 904 m
	Tunnel Alt-Glienicke 304 m
(6)	Schönefeld-Nord (Nordteil)
(7)	Schönefeld-Süd (Nordteil)
(6)	Schönefeld-Nord (Südteil)
(7)	Schönefeld-Süd (Südteil)
(8)	Flughafen Berlin-Brandenburg
(9)	Waltersdorfer 3-way interchange A 117
(10)	Schönefelder Kreuz 4-way interchange A 13 E55 A 10
