= Seddiner See =

- Municipality
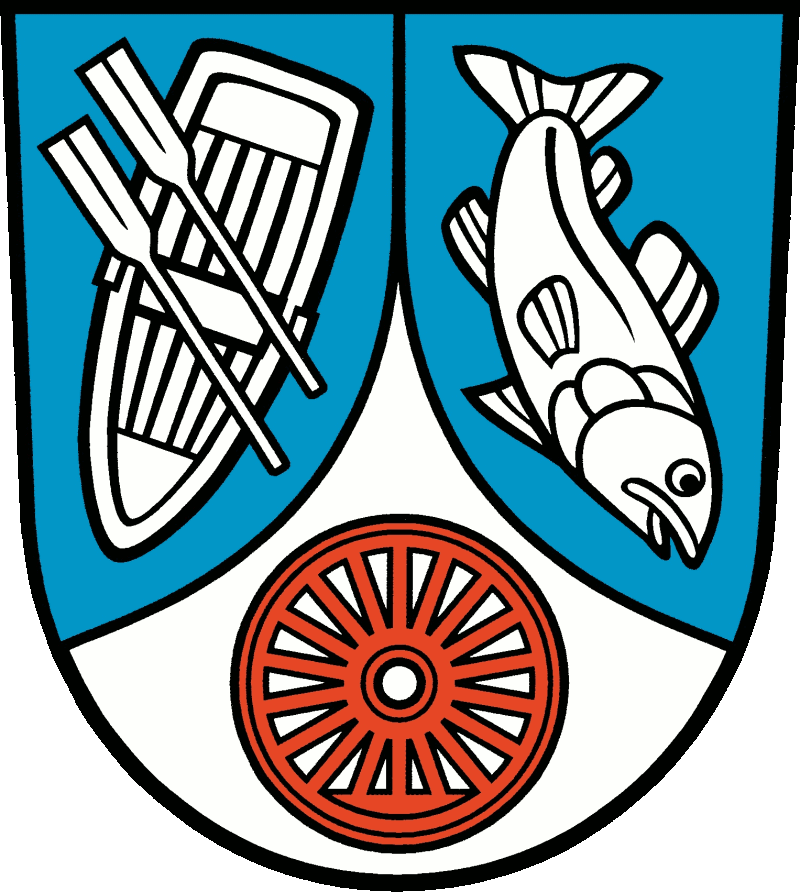
- Coat of arms

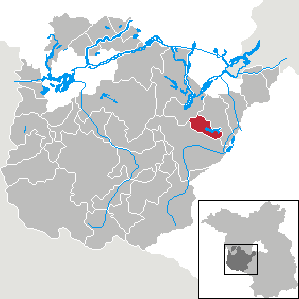
- Location of Seddiner See within Potsdam-Mittelmark district
- Interactive map of Seddiner See
- Location within Germany Location within Brandenburg
- Coordinates: 52°16′00″N 13°01′00″E
- Country: Germany
- State: Brandenburg
- District: Potsdam-Mittelmark
- Subdivisions: 3 Ortsteile

Government
  - Mayor (2022–30): Carina Simmes

Area
  - Total: 24.03 km^{2} (9.28 sq mi)
- Elevation: 49 m (161 ft)

Population (2025-12-31)
  - Total: 4,790
  - Density: 199/km^{2} (516/sq mi)
- Time zone: UTC+01:00 (CET)
  - Summer (DST): UTC+02:00 (CEST)
- Postal codes: 14554
- Dialling codes: 033205
- Vehicle registration: PM
- Website: www.seddiner-see.de

Seddiner See is a municipality in the Potsdam-Mittelmark district, in Brandenburg, Germany.

== Demography ==
Development of population since 1875 within the current Boundaries (Blue Line: Population; Dotted Line: Comparison to Population development in Brandenburg state; Grey Background: Time of Nazi Germany; Red Background: Time of communist East Germany)

Recent Population Development and Projections (Population Development before Census 2011 (blue line); Recent Population Development according to the Census in Germany in 2011 (blue bordered line); Official projections for 2005-2030 (yellow line); for 2017-2030 (scarlet line); for 2020-2030 (green line)

Seddiner See: Population development
within the current boundaries (2020)

Year	Pop.	±% p.a.
1875	438	—
1890	434	−0.06%
1910	589	+1.54%
1925	1,091	+4.20%
1939	1,806	+3.67%
1950	2,711	+3.76%
1964	2,692	−0.05%

Year	Pop.	±% p.a.
1971	2,755	+0.33%
1981	3,747	+3.12%
1985	3,921	+1.14%
1990	4,167	+1.22%
1995	4,268	+0.48%
2000	4,339	+0.33%
2005	4,279	−0.28%

Year	Pop.	±% p.a.
2010	4,198	−0.38%
2015	4,349	+0.71%
2016	4,444	+2.18%
2017	4,606	+3.65%
2018	4,590	−0.35%
2019	4,551	−0.85%
2020	4,511	−0.88%
