= Bundesautobahn 13 =

Federal motorway in Germany

A 13
- Bundesautobahn 13

Route information
- Length: 196 km (122 mi)

Major junctions
- North end: Berlin
- South end: Dresden

Location
- Country: Germany
- States: Brandenburg, Saxony

Highway system
- Roads in Germany; Autobahns; List; Federal; List; State; E-roads
← A 12	→ A 14

Bundesautobahn 13 (translates from German as Federal Motorway 13, short form Autobahn 13, abbreviated as BAB 13 or A 13) is an autobahn in eastern Germany, connecting Berlin with Dresden.

== History ==
The course of the A 13 was initially planned differently in the early 1930s than later realized. The alignment was originally about 30 kilometers further west between Golßen and Ortrand approximately along the railway Berlin-Dresden and thus affected the villages Doberlug-Kirchhain, Finsterwalde, Luckau and Schlieben. This would eliminate the motorway junction to the A 15 and the existing motorway gap between the freeways between Leipzig, Dresden, Berlin and Cottbus would have a lesser extent.

The sections from the junction Schönefeld to the Teupitz junction and from the triangle Dresden North to the junction Ortrand were completed in 1938 in two lanes (two lanes in each direction) and the section Ortrand Ruhland one lane. Here, the second lane was opened to traffic in 1939. In the same year followed the 39.5-kilometer section Ruhland-Calau (two lanes). In 1940 the sections Teupitz-Freiwalde and AD Spreewald - AS Calau followed in two lanes. Also in 1940 was completed by the gap closure of the last missing section Freiwalde - AD Spreewald in one-lane version of the route Berlin-Dresden. In 1962, this section was expanded two lanes. Initially, the crossing structure in the Spreewald motorway intersection remained unfinished, so that vehicles from and to Dresden had to drive on the southern ramps in oncoming traffic. The motorway triangle Spreewald was finally released on 4 December 1962 without an intersection for traffic.

In the area of the motorway intersection Dresden-North, the A 13 was used from 1951 to 1971 temporarily as a motorcycle and car racing track (Dresden motorway spider).

An extension of the motorway to Prague was planned before World War II as well as during GDR times in different routings. Finally the German section of the highway from Dresden to Prague was projected in first drafts after 1990 as a continuation of the A 13. Meanwhile, the route was realized as A 17.

On the long and dead straight section between the interchanges Ortrand and Ruhland was until the 1990s, a motorway makeshift airfield. The usually green median strip was concreted at this point. This resulted in a runway with the two lanes together. This was superficially to serve as a makeshift route for the aircraft of the National People's Army and its allied forces, since according to the scenario, the existing airfields were intended only for the launches. It was expected that in a possible invasion landing fighter jets at the home airport would no longer have been possible.

At both ends of the runway there were parking spaces for jets, which could be identified by the heaped-up exhaust jet deflectors. This would have protected the nearby forest from fires, which could have been caused by the ignition of a jet engine. After the fall of the Berlin Wall, the aircraft parking lots were converted into parking lots, and these were also dismantled, so that in 2005 only the filled exhaust gas deflectors could be seen.

== Exit list ==
(1)	Schönefeld 4-way interchange A 10, A 113
(2)	Ragow
(3)	Mittenwalde
(3a)	Bestensee B 246
	Services Am Kahlberg
(4)	Groß Köris
(5)	Teupitz
(5a)	Baruth/Mark
(6)	Staakow
(7)	Freiwalde B 115
	Services Berstetal
(8)	Duben B 87
	Services Rüblingsheide
(9)	Lübbenau/Spreewald
(10)	Spreewald 3-way interchange A 15
(11)	Kittlitz
(12)	Calau
(13)	Bronkow
(14)	Großräschen B 96
	Services Freienhufener Eck
(15)	Klettwitz
(16)	Schwarzheide
(17)	Ruhland B 169
	Schwarze-Elster-Brücke
(18)	Ortrand
	Pulsnitzbrücke
(19)	Schönborn
(20)	Thiendorf/Riesa B 98
(21)	Radeburg
(22)	Marsdorf
(23)	Dresden-Nord 3-way interchange A 4
