= Road maintenance depot =

Site for staff, material, and equipment that are necessary for road maintenance

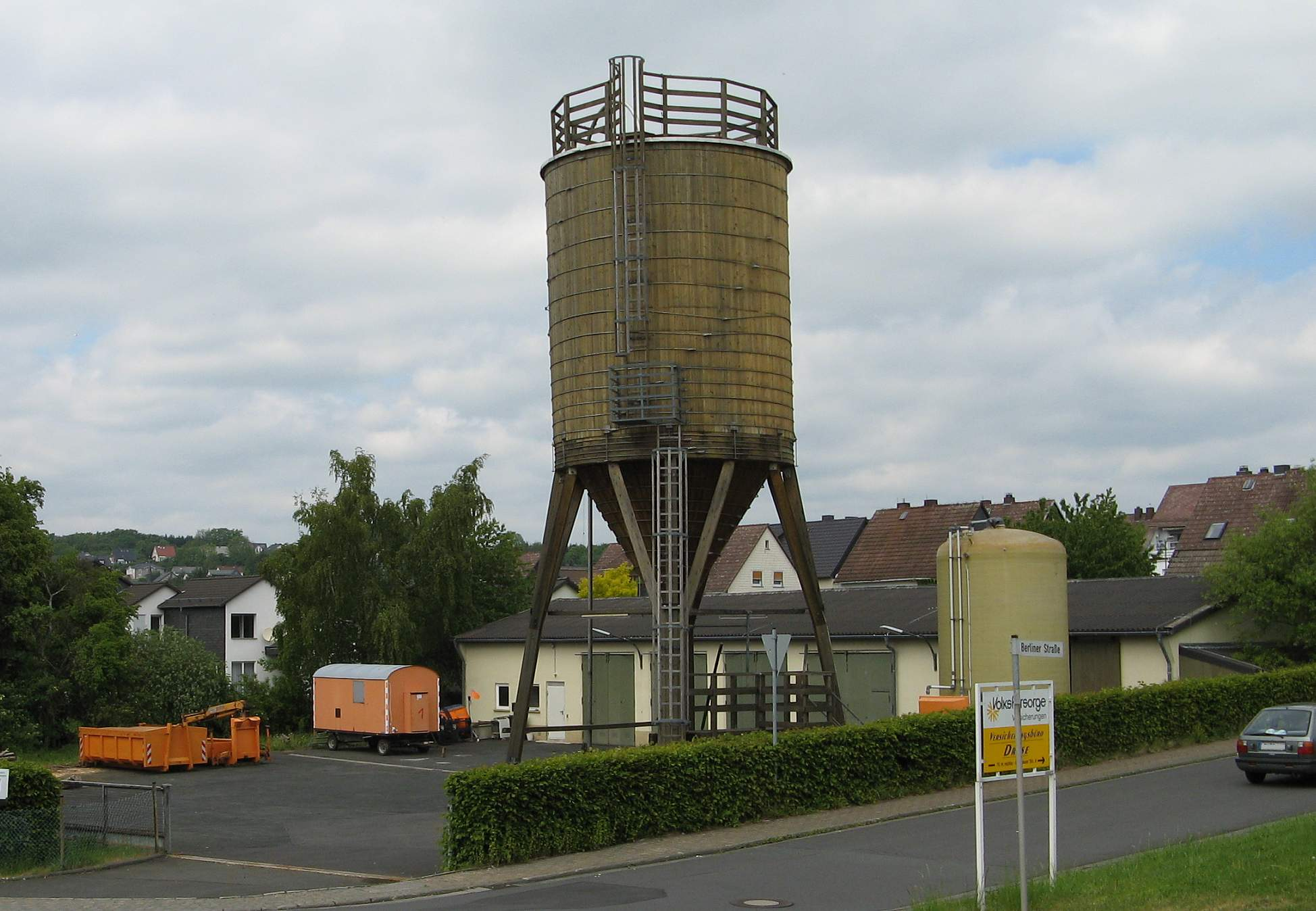
A small suburban maintenance depot with a brine tank in Germany.

A road maintenance depot is a depot used by road maintenance agencies for storing works equipment and organising maintenance operations. Road maintenance depots can range in size from small sheds storing just a few pieces of equipment, to vast buildings housing computer and closed-circuit television systems, allowing operators to monitor conditions across the road network.

Road maintenance depots carry gear for a number of tasks, including road works, snow removal, planting of road verge and central reservations and storm drain maintenance. Most depots will have limited accommodation facilities for staff who are on-call, particularly during heavy winter storms, when travel between the worker's home and the depot may be restricted. Road maintenance depots also include garages and repair shops for the fleets of vehicles stored within, and large depots keep supplies of fuel and road salt for drivers.

== Operations ==
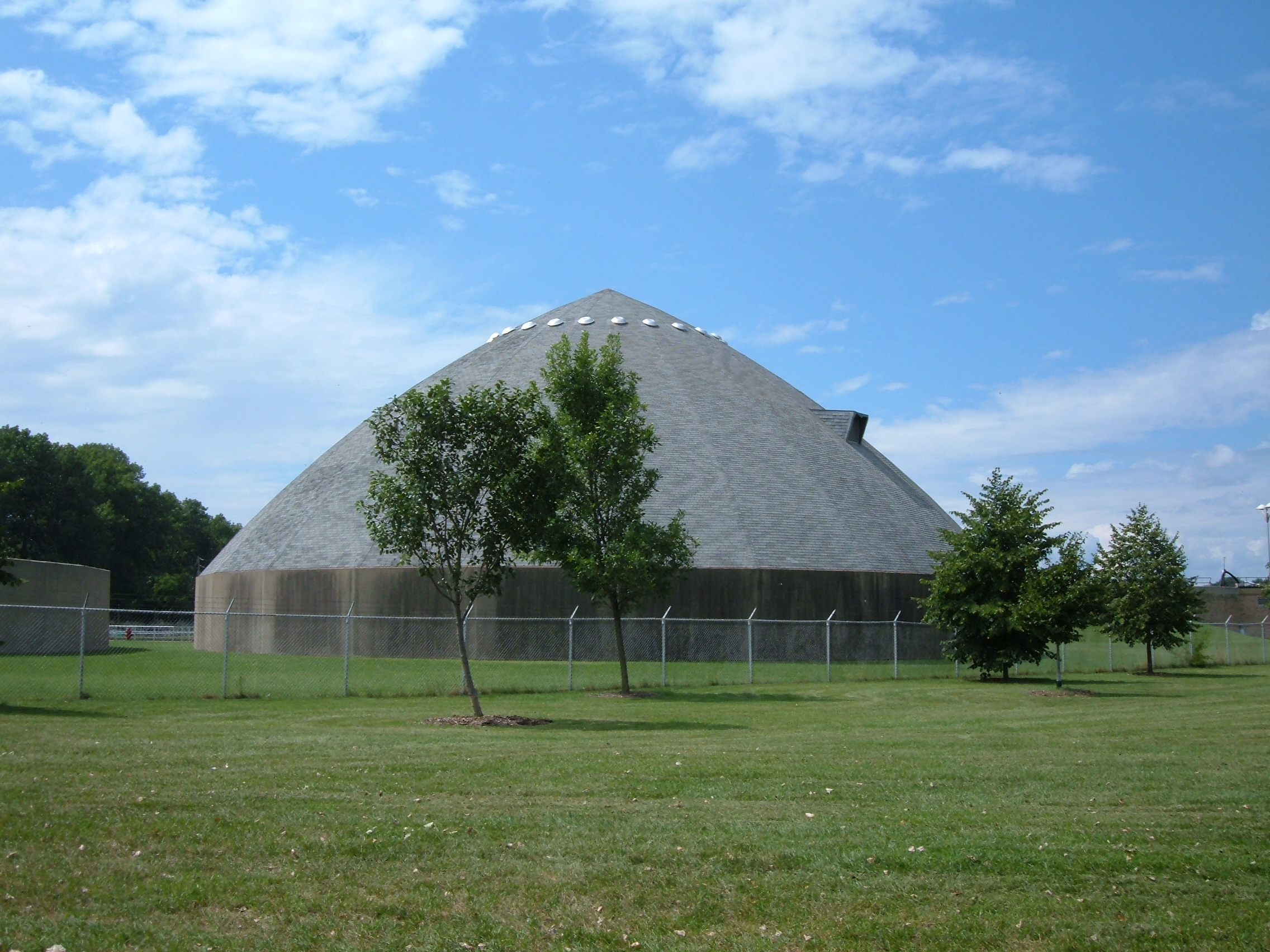
A salt barn at a depot near Lake Michigan, United States.

Depots carry a wide range of vehicles to cover most eventualities, depending on the location of the depot; small urban depots carry street sweeper vehicles and small gully emptiers, while larger rural and motorway-based depots hold fleets of winter service vehicles and engineering vehicles, and often tow trucks and breakdown vehicles for rescuing broken down or stranded equipment. Other vehicles commonly kept at depots include lawnmowers, sprayers and road markers.

Along with garages, most depots also have either salt barns or brine tanks, to store de-icing agents for use in winter months, and filling stations to refuel vehicles, especially those that use red diesel, which is not available at public filling stations. Larger depots have vehicle washes and repair shops to maintain the fleet, and a cafeteria and on-call room for workers.

== International ==
=== Germany ===
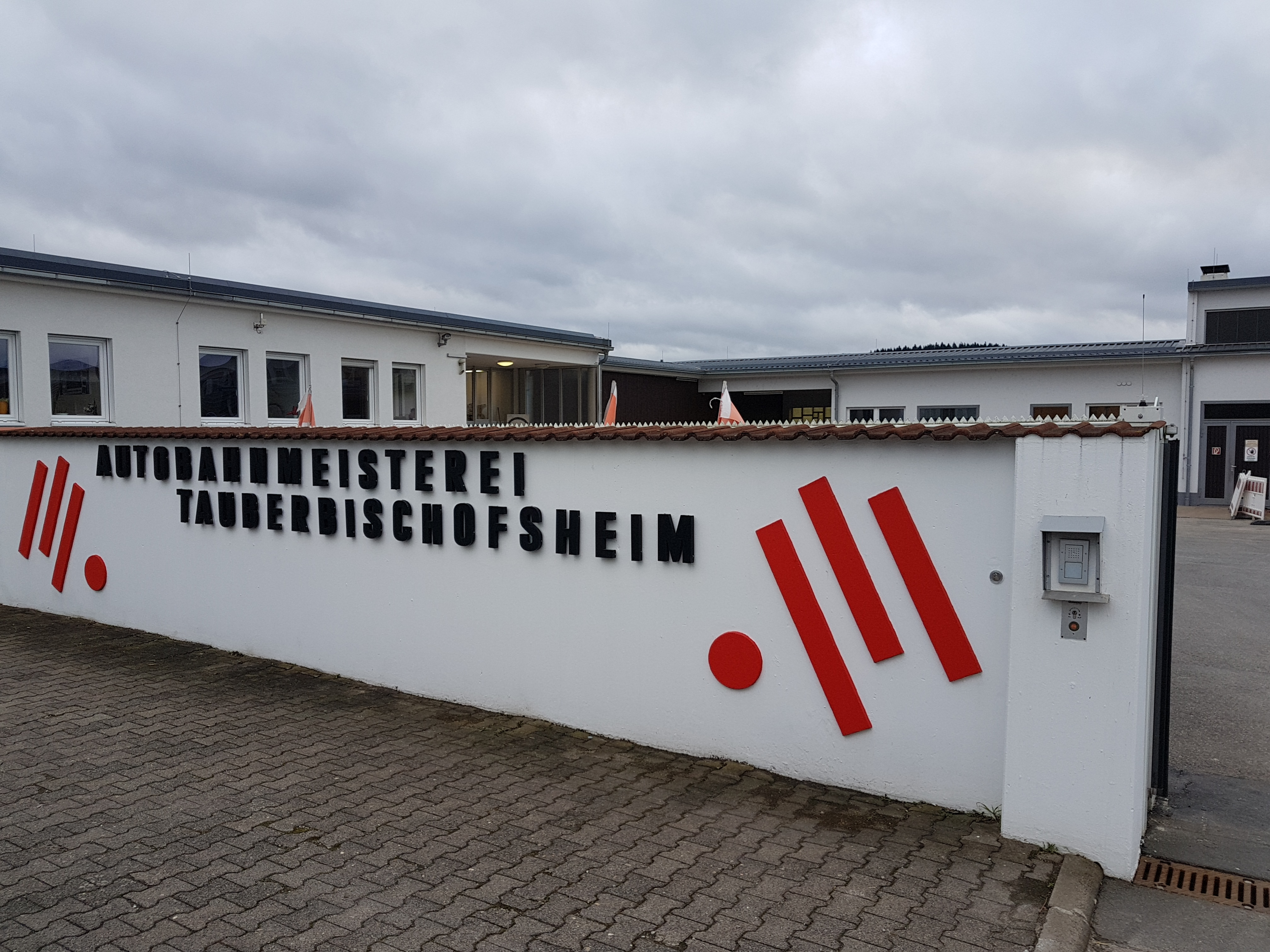
Autobahnmeisterei Tauberbischofsheim in Germany

Road maintenance depots in Germany are known as Straßenmeisterei or Autobahnmeisterei. Responsibility for operating the depot depends on the type of road covered by the catchment area of the depot; those that cover the autobahn network and major road are owned by the Federal Government, while those that cover more urban roads are operated by the local city administration.

=== United Kingdom ===
All public road maintenance depots in the United Kingdom are owned by the Highways Agency or its contractors, although the depot on the privately owned M6 Toll is run by the operators of the road. Most are located along the edge of motorways, and are signposted "Works Exit" or "Works Access Only". These signs are also used to disguise sliproads leading to sensitive military institutions such as RAF Welford and to dissuade members of the public from using emergency evacuation routes and short cuts designed for emergency vehicles.
