= Kremmen =

- Town
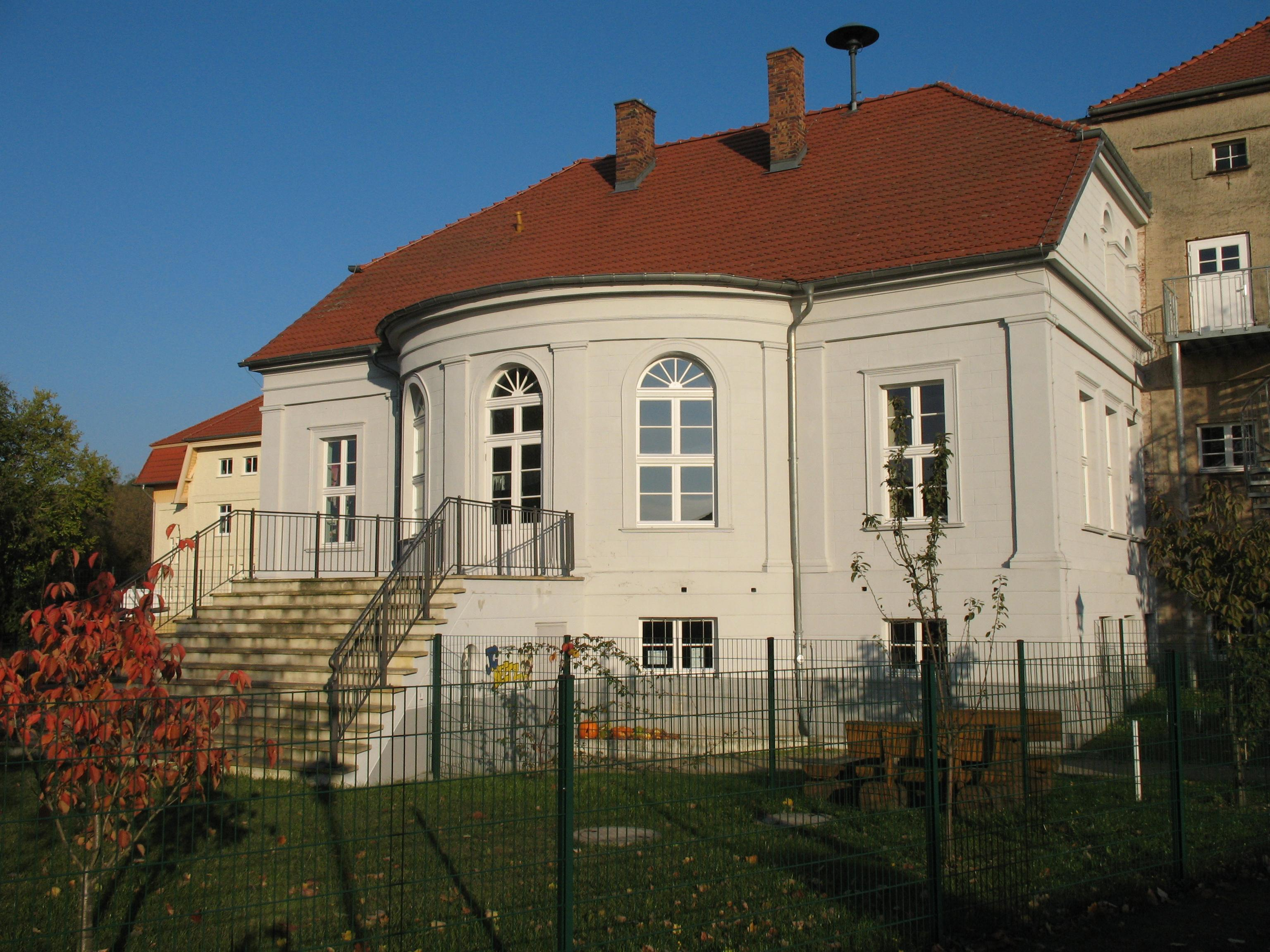
- Manor in Beetz

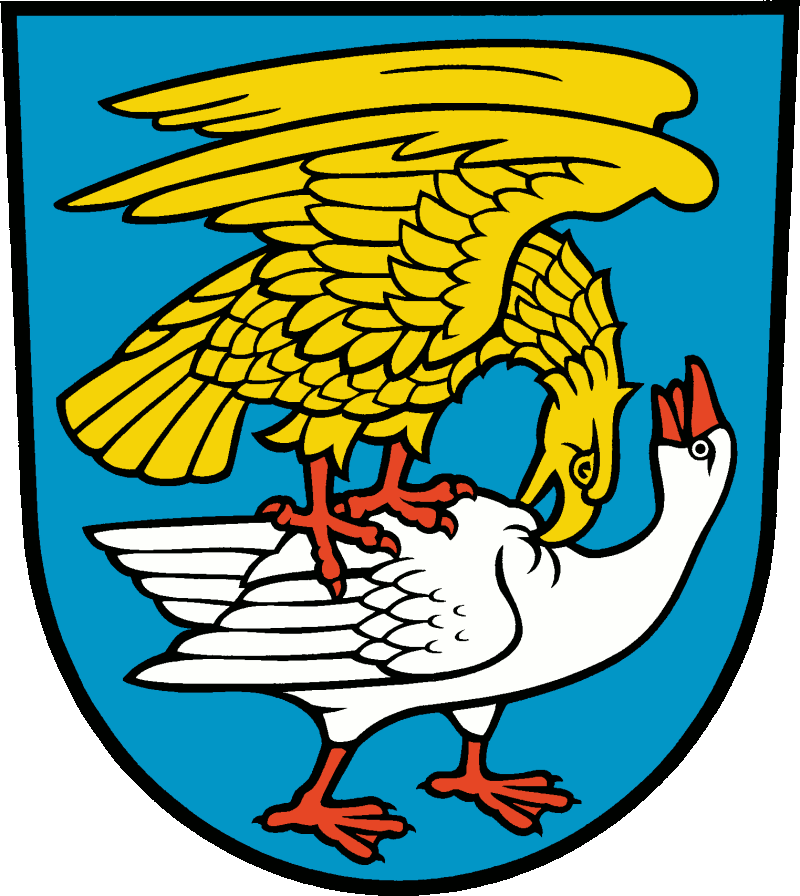
- Coat of arms

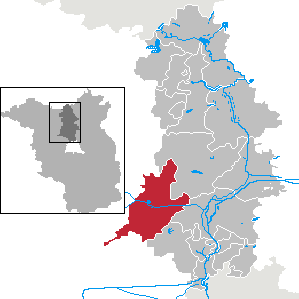
- Location of Kremmen within Oberhavel district
- Interactive map of Kremmen
- Location within Germany Location within Brandenburg
- Coordinates: 52°46′00″N 13°01′59″E
- Country: Germany
- State: Brandenburg
- District: Oberhavel
- Subdivisions: 7 districts

Government
  - Mayor (2016–24): Sebastian Busse (CDU)

Area
  - Total: 209.55 km^{2} (80.91 sq mi)
- Elevation: 39 m (128 ft)

Population (2025-12-31)
  - Total: 7,535
  - Density: 35.96/km^{2} (93.13/sq mi)
- Time zone: UTC+01:00 (CET)
  - Summer (DST): UTC+02:00 (CEST)
- Postal codes: 16766
- Dialling codes: 033055
- Vehicle registration: OHV
- Website: www.kremmen.de

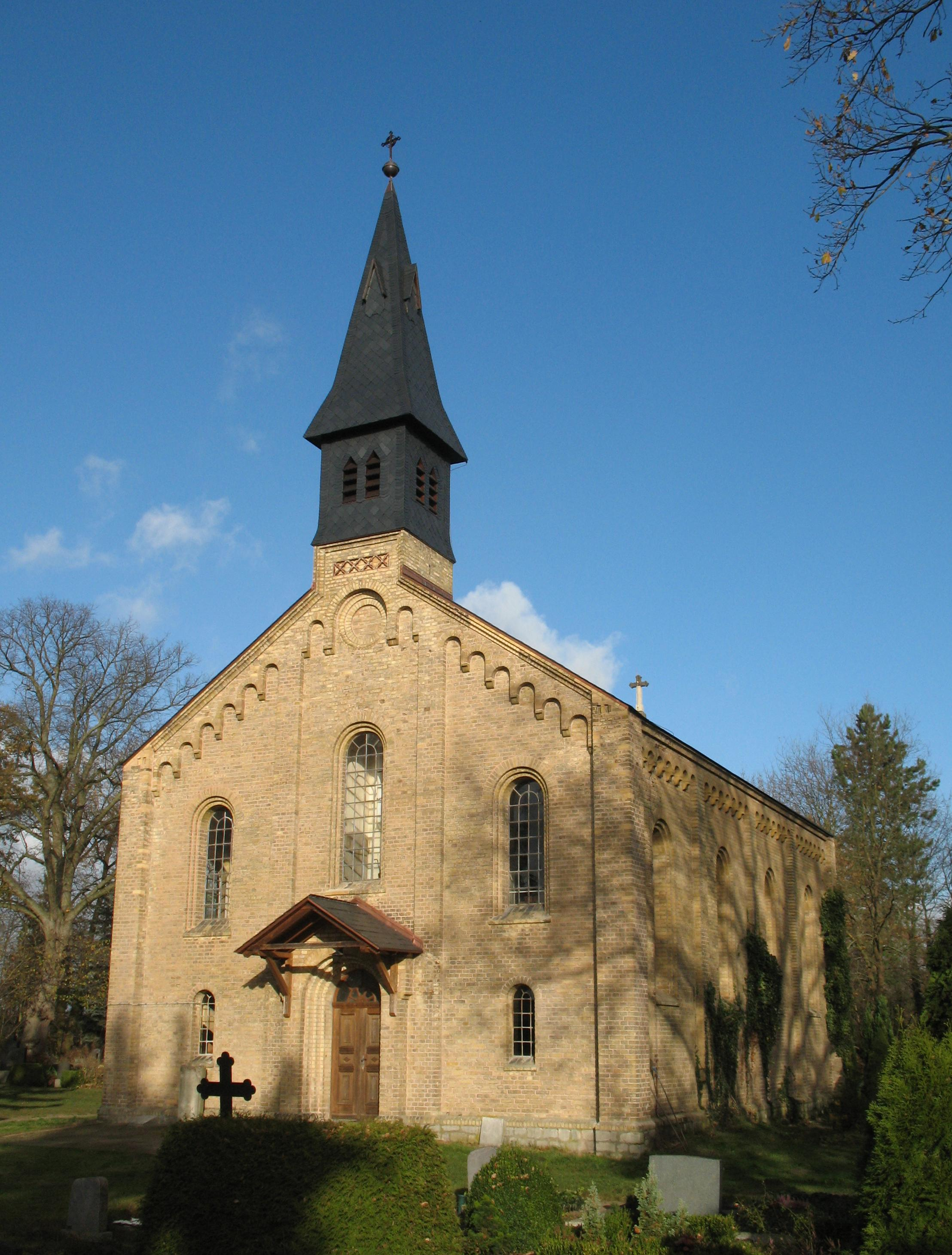
Church in Hohenbruch

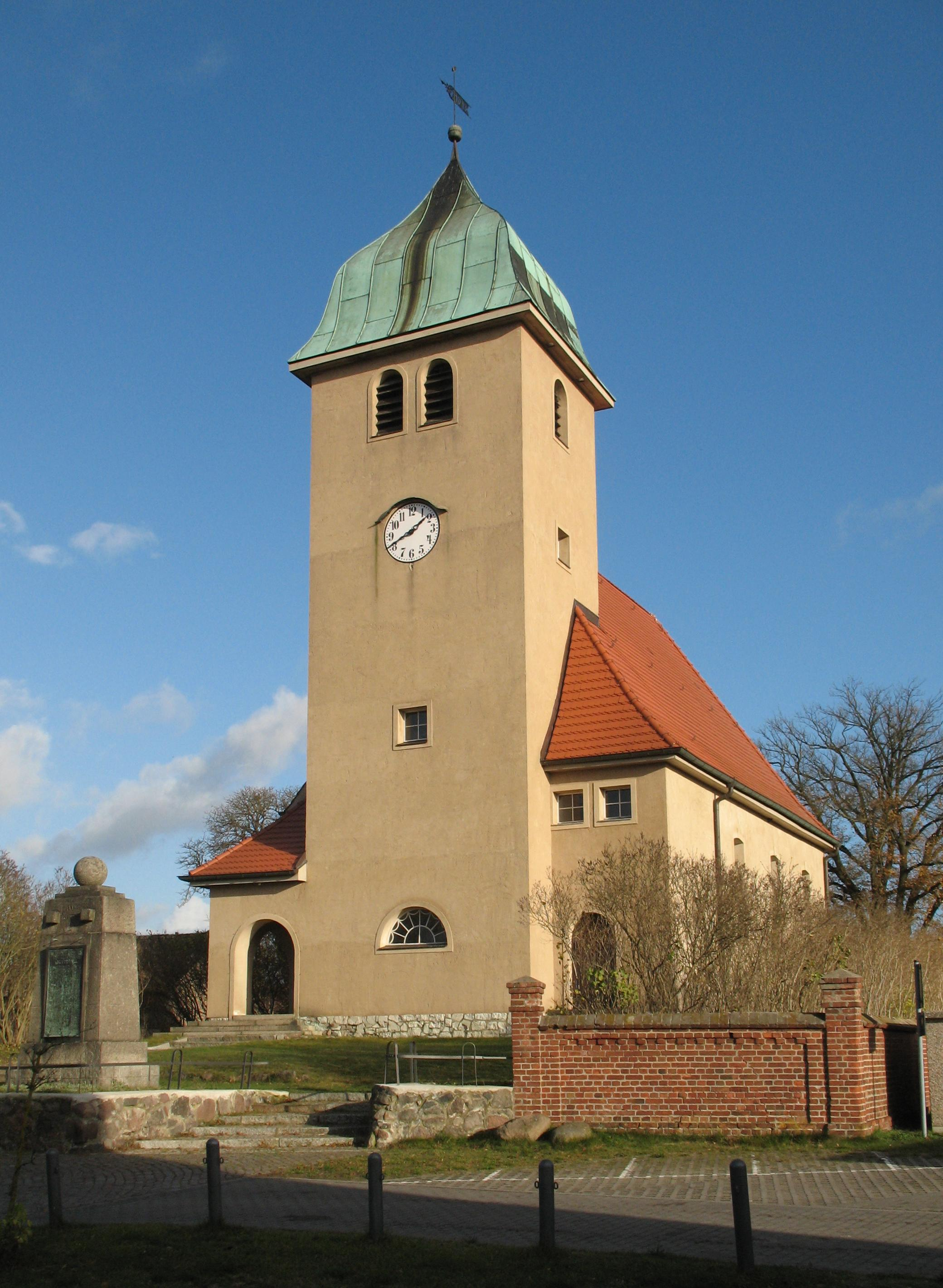
Church in Sommerfeld

Kremmen (German pronunciation: [ˈkʁɛmən]) is a town in the district of Oberhavel, in Brandenburg, Germany. It is located 15 km (10 miles) west of Oranienburg and 38 km (24 miles) northwest of Berlin. It is known mostly for its castle Ziethen. The local church contains an organ built in 1817 by Tobias Thurley.

== Demography ==
Development of Population since 1875 within the Current Boundaries (Blue Line: Population; Dotted Line: Comparison to Population Development of Brandenburg state; Grey background: Time of Nazi rule; Red background: Time of communist rule)

Recent Population Development and Projections (Population Development before Census 2011 (blue line); Recent Population Development according to the Census in Germany in 2011 (blue bordered line); Official projections for 2005-2030 (yellow line); for 2014-2030 (red line); for 2017-2030 (scarlet line)

Kremmen: Population development
within the current boundaries (2020)

Year	Pop.	±% p.a.
1875	6,917	—
1890	6,675	−0.24%
1910	6,455	−0.17%
1925	7,244	+0.77%
1933	7,382	+0.24%
1939	7,722	+0.75%
1946	9,840	+3.52%
1950	9,819	−0.05%
1964	8,059	−1.40%
1971	7,617	−0.80%
1981	6,771	−1.17%
1985	6,630	−0.52%
1989	6,369	−1.00%
1990	6,259	−1.73%
1991	6,233	−0.42%

Year	Pop.	±% p.a.
1992	6,187	−0.74%
1993	6,188	+0.02%
1994	6,438	+4.04%
1995	6,568	+2.02%
1996	6,613	+0.69%
1997	6,683	+1.06%
1998	6,862	+2.68%
1999	7,138	+4.02%
2000	7,234	+1.34%
2001	7,231	−0.04%
2002	7,306	+1.04%
2003	7,437	+1.79%
2004	7,409	−0.38%
2005	7,373	−0.49%
2006	7,342	−0.42%

Year	Pop.	±% p.a.
2007	7,303	−0.53%
2008	7,244	−0.81%
2009	7,124	−1.66%
2010	7,102	−0.31%
2011	7,121	+0.27%
2012	7,115	−0.08%
2013	7,110	−0.07%
2014	7,108	−0.03%
2015	7,238	+1.83%
2016	7,310	+0.99%
2017	7,498	+2.57%
2018	7,657	+2.12%
2019	7,734	+1.01%
2020	7,700	−0.44%

== Mayors ==
Klaus-Jürgen Sasse (SPD) was elected in October 2008 with 53,1 % of the votes.

Sebastian Busse (CDU) was elected in November 2016 with 56,9 % of the votes. He started in office in March 2017.

== Photogallery ==
Clinic buildings „Waldhaus Charlottenburg“ in Kremmen-Sommerfeld

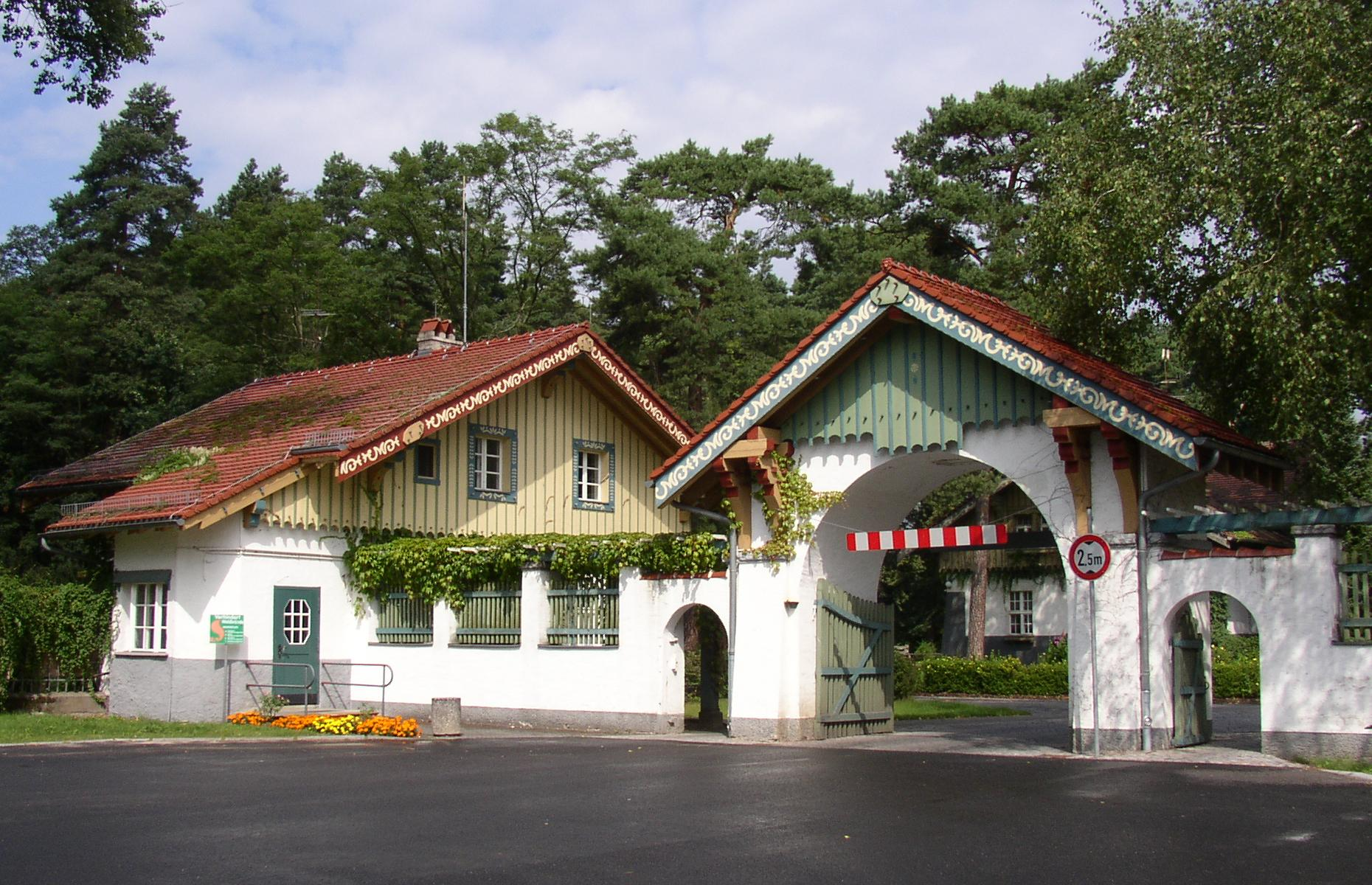

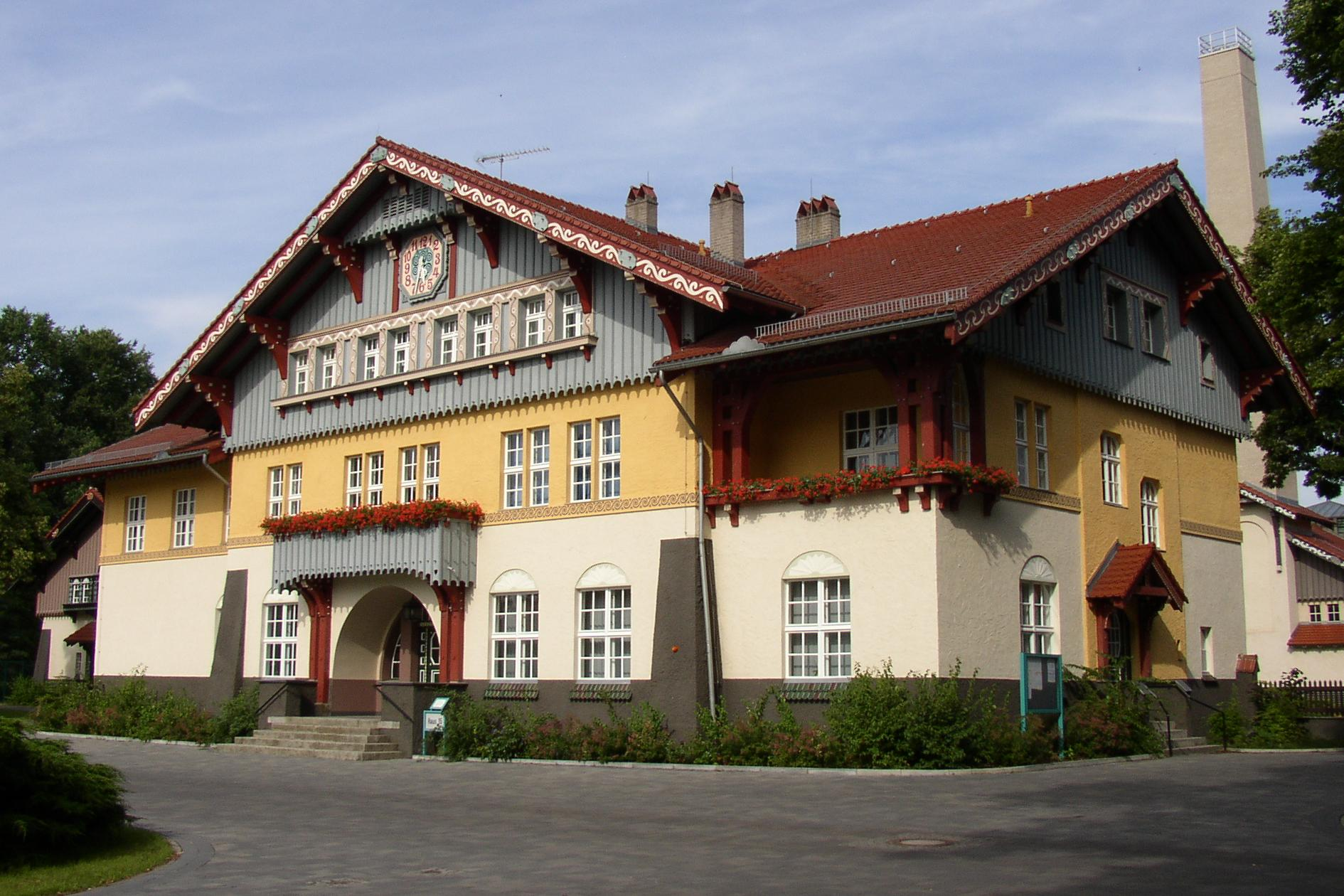

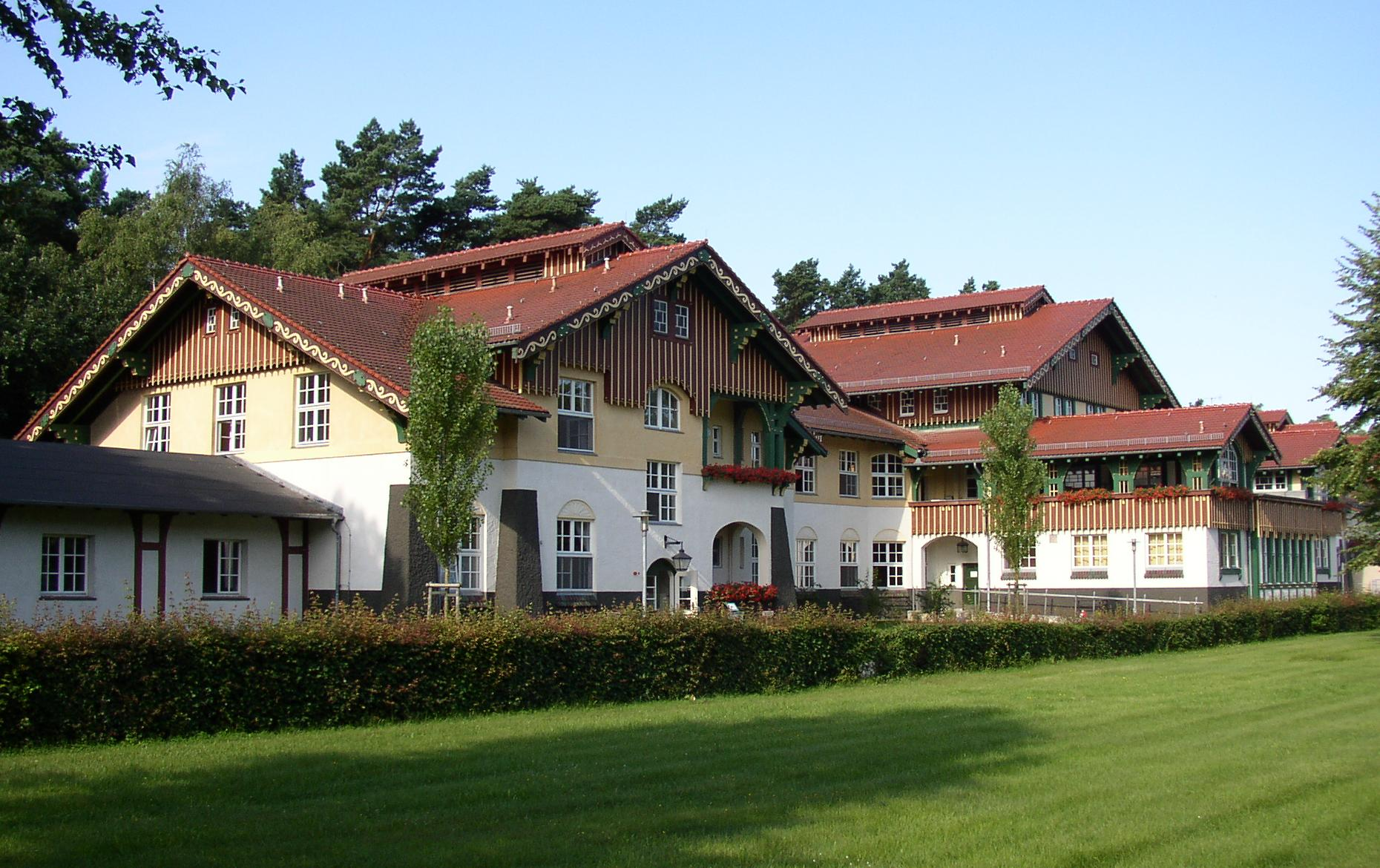

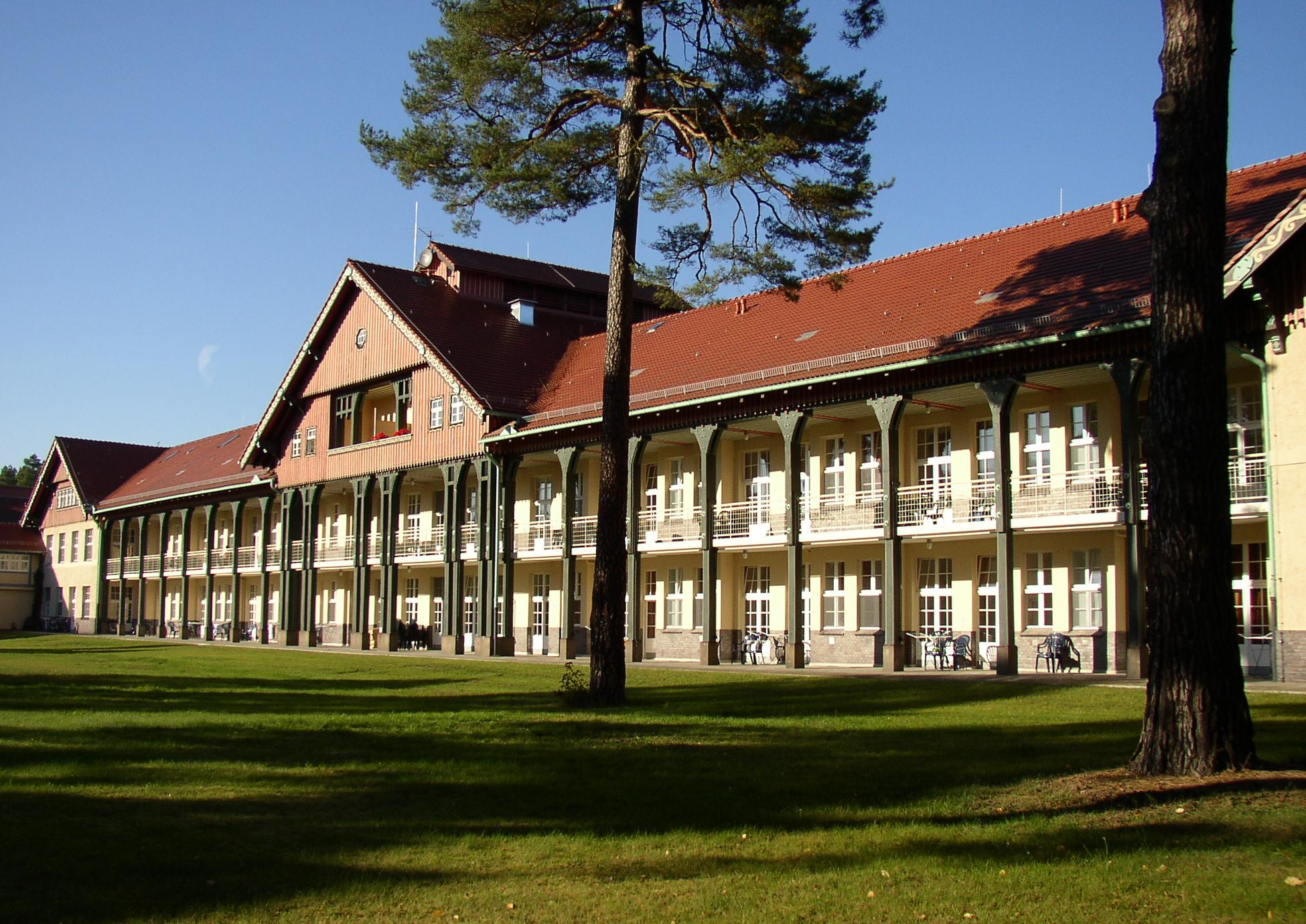

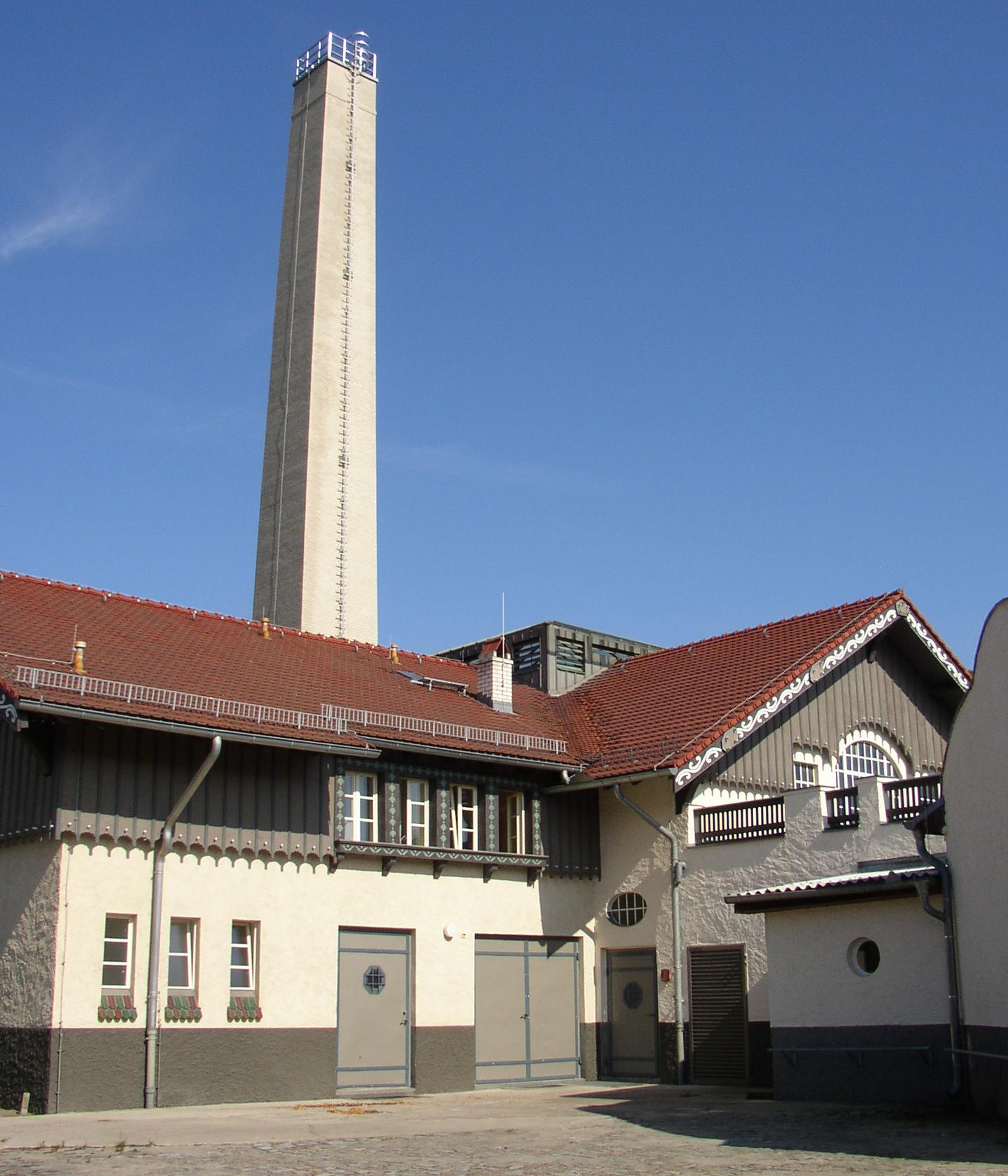

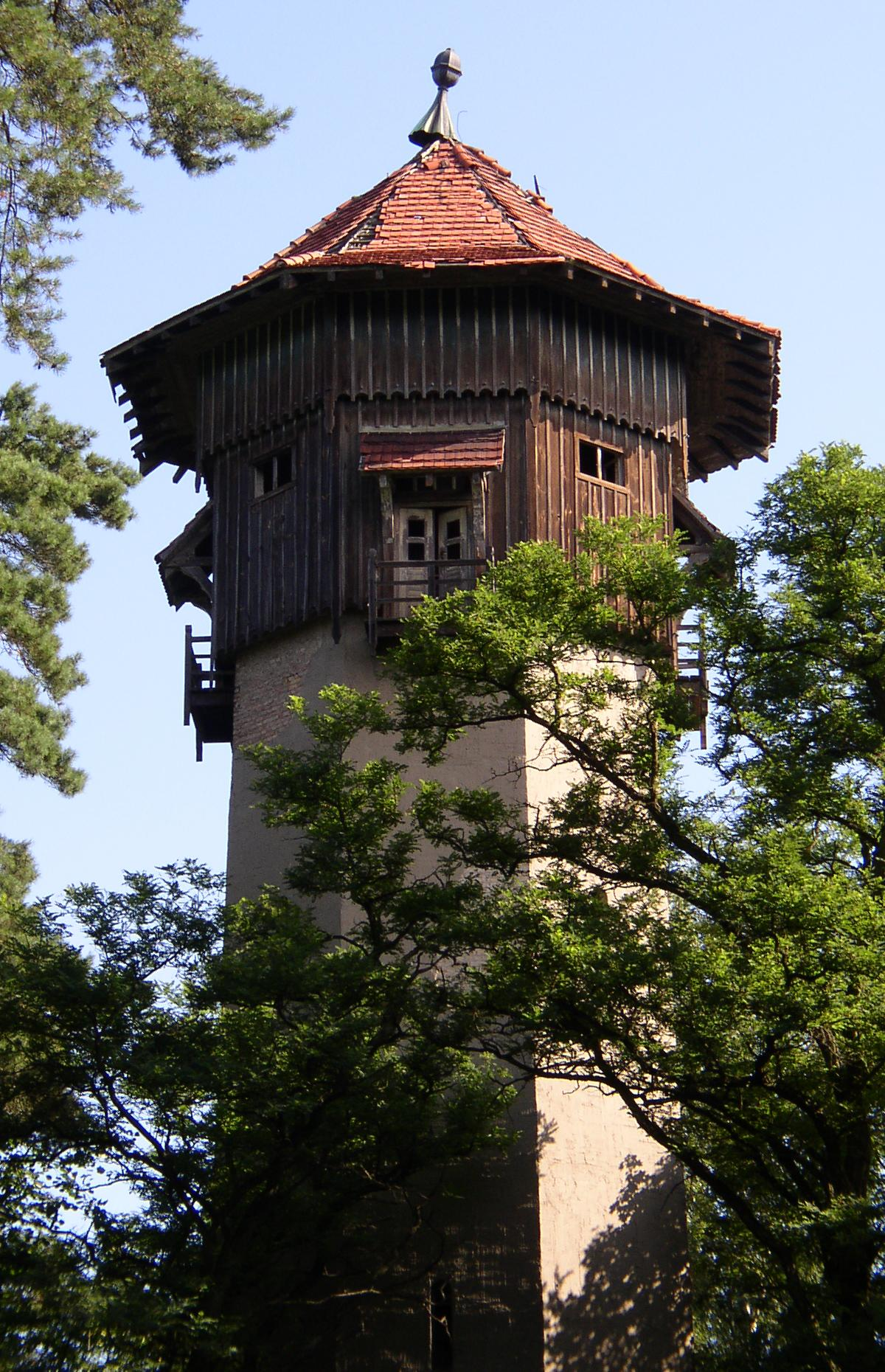

== Personalities ==
- Richard Dehmel (1863-1920), poet and writer, spent his childhood in Kremmen
