= Wildau =

- Town
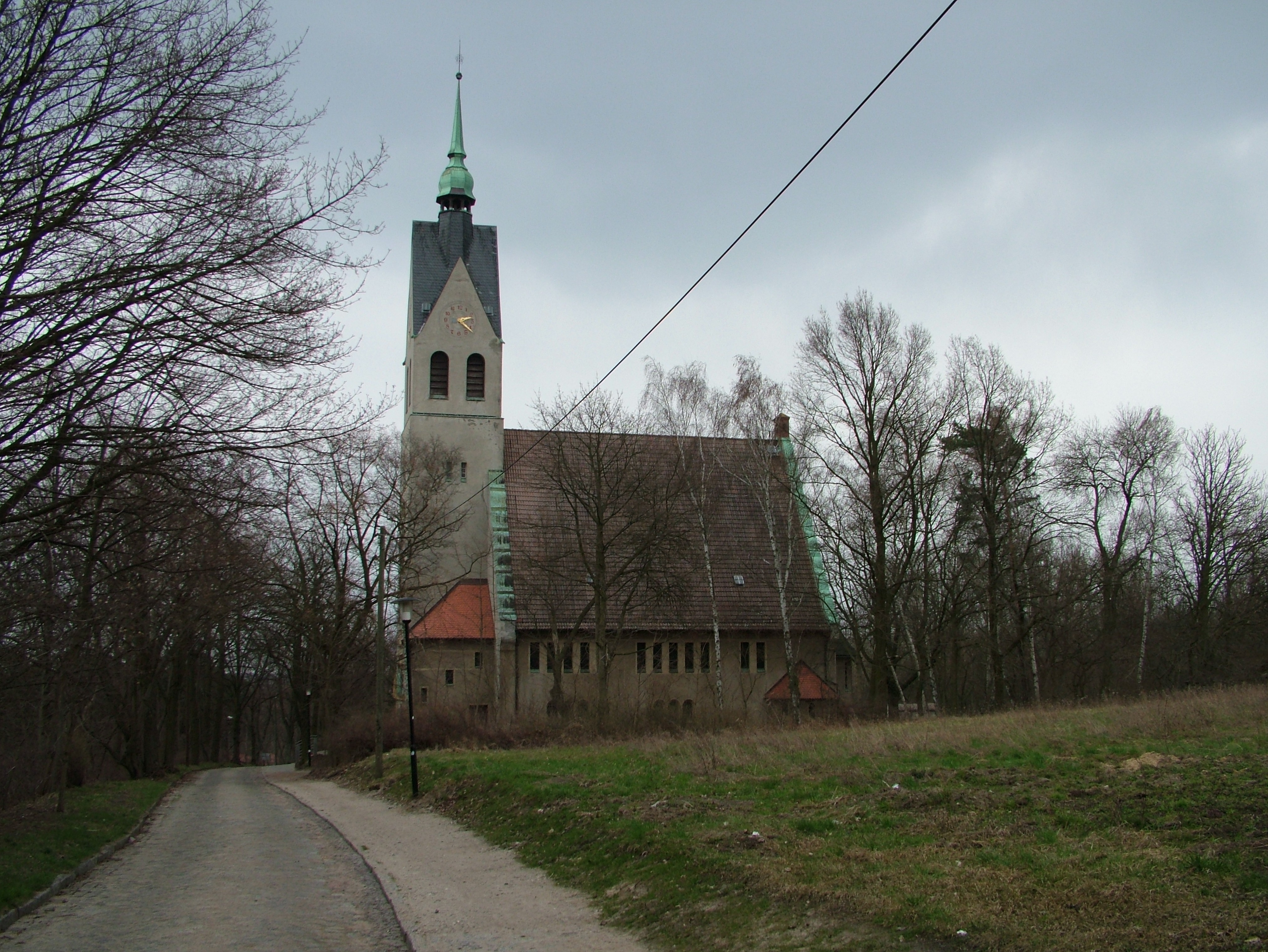
- Church in Wildau

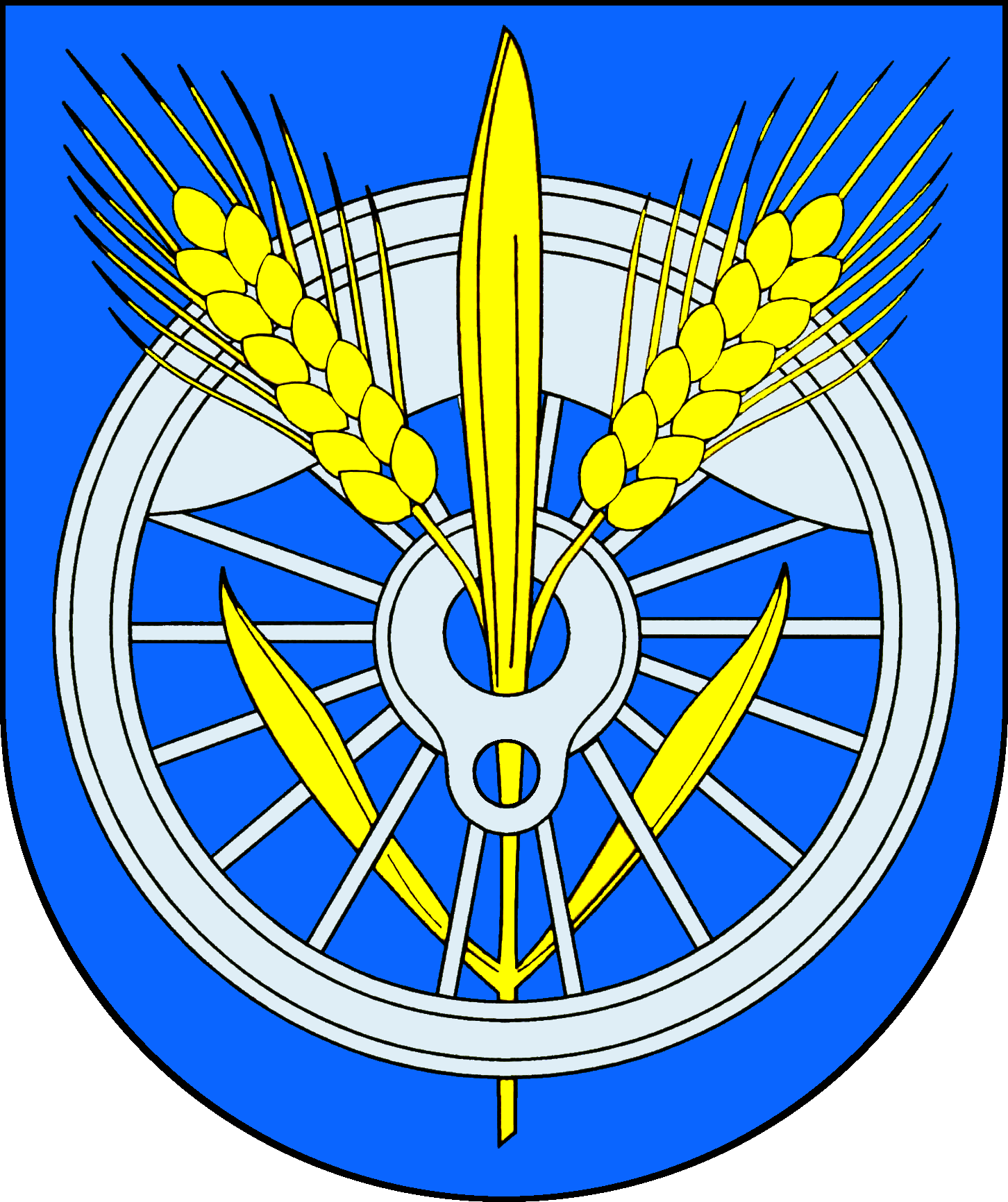
- Coat of arms

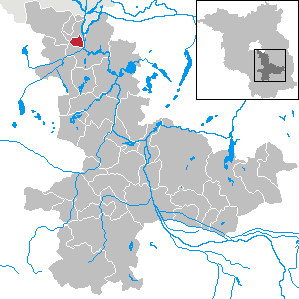
- Location of Wildau within Dahme-Spreewald district
- Interactive map of Wildau
- Location within Germany Location within Brandenburg
- Coordinates: 52°19′N 13°38′E
- Country: Germany
- State: Brandenburg
- District: Dahme-Spreewald

Government
  - Mayor (2022–30): Frank Nerlich

Area
  - Total: 9.1 km^{2} (3.5 sq mi)
- Elevation: 45 m (148 ft)

Population (2025-12-31)
  - Total: 10,952
  - Density: 1,200/km^{2} (3,100/sq mi)
- Time zone: UTC+01:00 (CET)
  - Summer (DST): UTC+02:00 (CEST)
- Postal codes: 15745
- Dialling codes: 03375
- Vehicle registration: LDS
- Website: www.wildau.de

Wildau (German pronunciation: [ˈvɪldaʊ]) is a German town of the state of Brandenburg, located in the district of Dahme-Spreewald. It is located close to Berlin and easily reached by the S-Bahn. As of 2019 its population was 10,404 inhabitants.

== History ==
The history of Wildau began with fisherman's families that settled by the Dahme River and then came to deliver sand, gravel and bricks from the region by boat to Berlin.

=== 1889-1933: Growing Industrial Region ===
Berlin Machine Building Corporation (B.M.A.G.), formerly L. Schwartzkopff, became one of the leading railway locomotive manufacturers in Germany in the late 19th century. The original plant, located in the centre of Berlin, became insufficient to meet the growing demands of railway operators. Therefore, the company began looking for a new plant site in the surrounding area around Berlin. An area of 600.000 sqm adjacent to Berlin–Görlitz railway, close to the town of Hoherlehme, was eventually chosen for this purpose in 1889.

The entire production of high-speed rotating machinery, generators, and electrical equipment was not long after relocated to B.M.A.G.'s new plant. From these beginnings, a new company - Maffei-Schwartzkopff Co. Ltd. - emerged, which in the following years equipped all Schwartzkopff and Maffei E-locomotives with electricity. In the aftermath of the Great Depression (1931), however, the site had to be closed.

=== 1933-1945: Wildau under the National Socialist Regime ===
In 1934 AEG took possession of the former Maffei-Schwartzkopff site and converted it into a feeder plant for aviation industries. Armament production began in 1936. Torpedoes, grenade shells, propeller hubs, cannon tubes, mortars and artillery were all produced. But two larger scale projects would become infamous. The locomotive plant at Wildau produced the infamous “Schienenwolf” (“rail wolf”), which the German Wehrmacht deployed during their retreat from the Soviet Union and Italy. And in the large locomotive assembly hangar 15/16, AEG employees built the armored locomotive of the “Führersonderzug“ (or 'Hitler's chartered train').

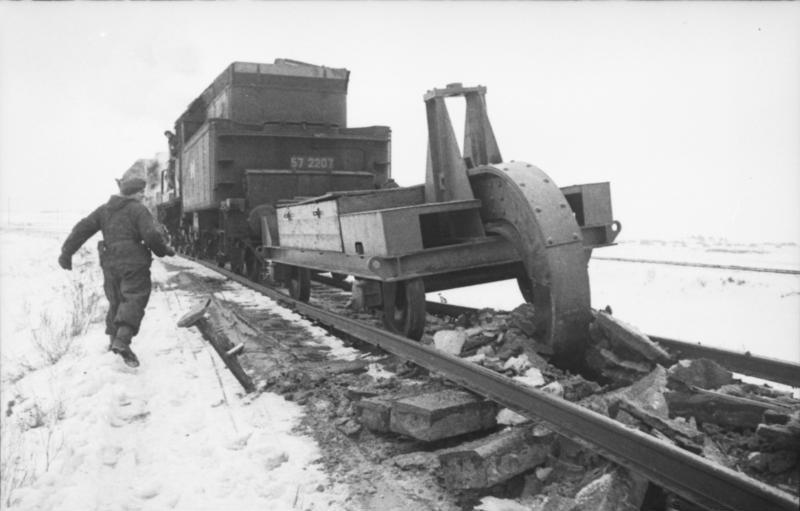
the notorious 'Schienenwolf' or 'rail wolf'

In April 1945, the Soviet Army occupied Wildau. Not long after, it was decided that all production halls should be demolished and all gear and equipment from B.M.A.G. and AEG removed.

== Demography ==
Development of population since 1875 within the current boundaries (blue line: population; dotted line: comparison to population development of Brandenburg state; grey background: time of Nazi rule; red background: time of communist rule)

Recent population development and projections (population development before 2011 census (blue line); recent population development according to the Census in Germany in 2011 (blue bordered line); official projections for 2005–2030 (yellow line); for 2020–2030 (green line); for 2017–2030 (scarlet line)

Wildau: Population development
within the current boundaries (2017)

Year	Pop.	±% p.a.
1875	290	—
1890	311	+0.47%
1910	2,865	+11.74%
1925	4,347	+2.82%
1933	4,509	+0.46%
1939	5,664	+3.87%
1946	5,166	−1.31%
1950	5,501	+1.58%
1964	8,391	+3.06%
1971	8,122	−0.46%
1981	7,826	−0.37%
1985	7,506	−1.04%
1989	7,169	−1.14%
1990	7,089	−1.12%
1991	7,350	+3.68%

Year	Pop.	±% p.a.
1992	7,403	+0.72%
1993	7,425	+0.30%
1994	7,405	−0.27%
1995	7,697	+3.94%
1996	8,131	+5.64%
1997	8,605	+5.83%
1998	9,120	+5.98%
1999	9,269	+1.63%
2000	9,352	+0.90%
2001	9,392	+0.43%
2002	9,378	−0.15%
2003	9,299	−0.84%
2004	9,432	+1.43%
2005	9,542	+1.17%
2006	9,642	+1.05%

Year	Pop.	±% p.a.
2007	9,819	+1.84%
2008	9,911	+0.94%
2009	9,906	−0.05%
2010	9,898	−0.08%
2011	9,731	−1.69%
2012	9,797	+0.68%
2013	9,878	+0.83%
2014	9,945	+0.68%
2015	9,978	+0.33%
2016	10,057	+0.79%
2017	10,093	+0.36%
2018	10,303	+2.08%
2019	10,404	+0.98%
2020	10,633	+2.20%

== Personalities who are associated with the city ==
- Walter Lehweß-Litzmann (1907–1986), Luftwaffe and NVA officer, later director of flight operations of Interflug, died in Wildau
- Willi Stoph (1914–1999), politician (SED), longtime chairman of the Council of Ministers of the GDR, is buried in the forest cemetery
