= European route E26 =

Road in trans-European E-road network

E26

Route information
- Length: 283 km (176 mi)

Major junctions
- West end: Hamburg
- East end: Berlin

Location
- Countries: Germany

Highway system
- International E-road network; A Class; B Class

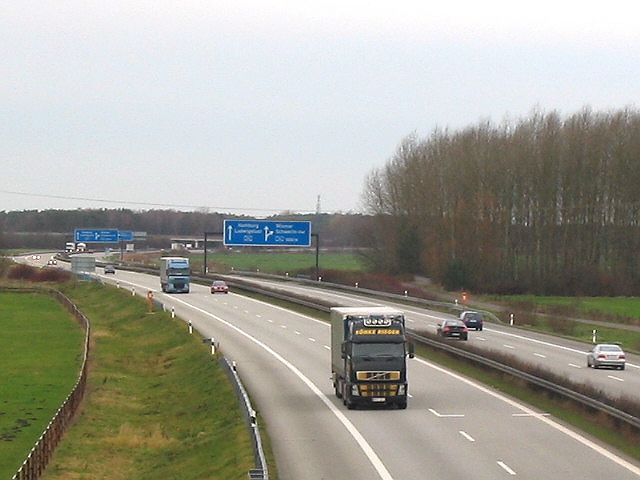
Autobahn 24 near Schwerin

European route E26 is a part of the trans-European road network. The route lies entirely within Germany and extends from Hamburg to Berlin, following sections of the A 24 and A 111 Autobahns.
