= Bergfelde =

District of Hohen Neuendorf

Bergfelde is a district of the city Hohen Neuendorf (Oberhavel district, Brandenburg) in the northern Berlin outskirts. The place was first mentioned in a document in 1349 and incorporated into Hohen Neuendorf on December 6, 1993.

== History ==
Bergfelde was first mentioned in a deed for transfer in 1349 as "Bercholtz" and is also named Berkow and Birkholz in literature.

In 1653, Luise Henriette von Oranien was given the village by her husband, Elector Friedrich Wilhelm of Brandenburg. The village at the time was assigned to the Bötzow district. In the following centuries, the owners and population of the village changed.

== Religion ==
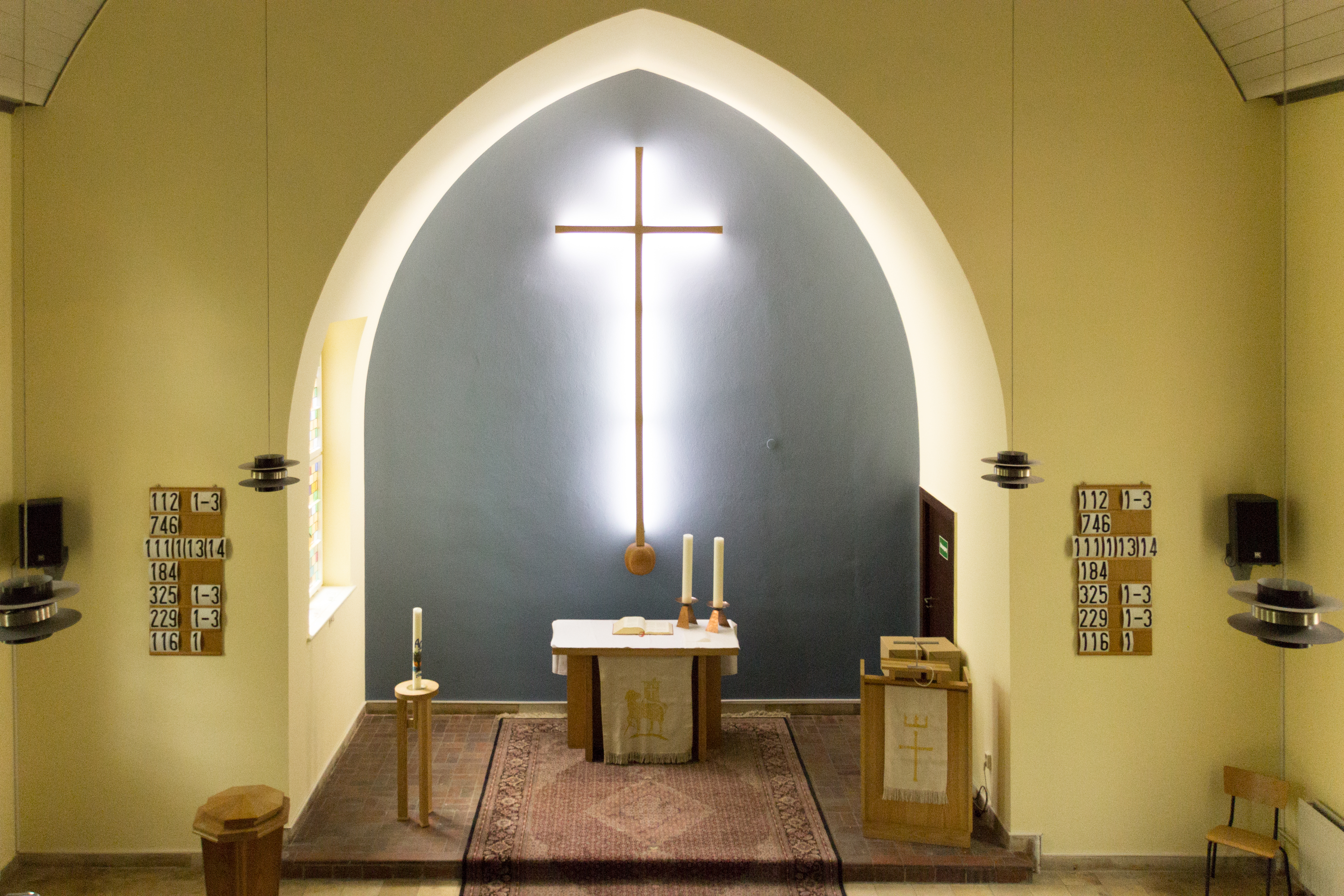
Dorfkirche Bergfelde Apsis and Chor

The Bergfelde-Schönfließ church community belongs to the Berlin North-East Church District (until 2008: Berlin-Pankow) in the Sprengel Berlin of the Evangelical Church Berlin-Brandenburg-Silesian Upper Lusatia.

== Parks and leisure ==
In Bergfelde there is the SV Grün-Weiß Bergfelde. The focus of the club is football, but other sports are also offered as leisure sports. Currently, the city of Hohen Neuendorf and the municipality of Mühlenbecker Land are planning the construction of a new sports field for the club's football games. The Tennisclub Grün Weiß Bergfelde is also active in Bergfelde.

== Economy and infrastructure ==
In Bergfelde there are various companies and craftsmen as well as several shopping opportunities, particularly the newly constructed town center with shopping and service offerings near the S-Bahn station.

The Schwarze Walfisch Gin comes from Bergfelde.

=== Education ===
In Bergfelde, there is a daycare center, various daycare facilities, and the Ahorn Elementary School with an after-school program. Additionally, there are the "EinsteinKids," a facility for open children and youth work.

=== Transportation ===
In terms of transportation, the area is well connected; on one hand through the state road L 171 with connection to the Berliner Stadtautobahn (A 111, Exit Stolpe) and the Bundesstraße 96a with connection to the Berliner Ring (A 10, Exit Birkenwerder), and on the other hand through the S-Bahn station Bergfelde, which runs parallel to the Berliner Außenring and was opened on May 27, 1962, on the Line S 8 (Zeuthen – Birkenwerder). The bus line 809 of the Oberhavel Verkehrsgesellschaft provides a connection to Hennigsdorf and Berlin-Hermsdorf (Bezirk Reinickendorf). This good connection makes the area a typical commuter town.
