= Roofensee =

Lake in Brandenburg, Germany

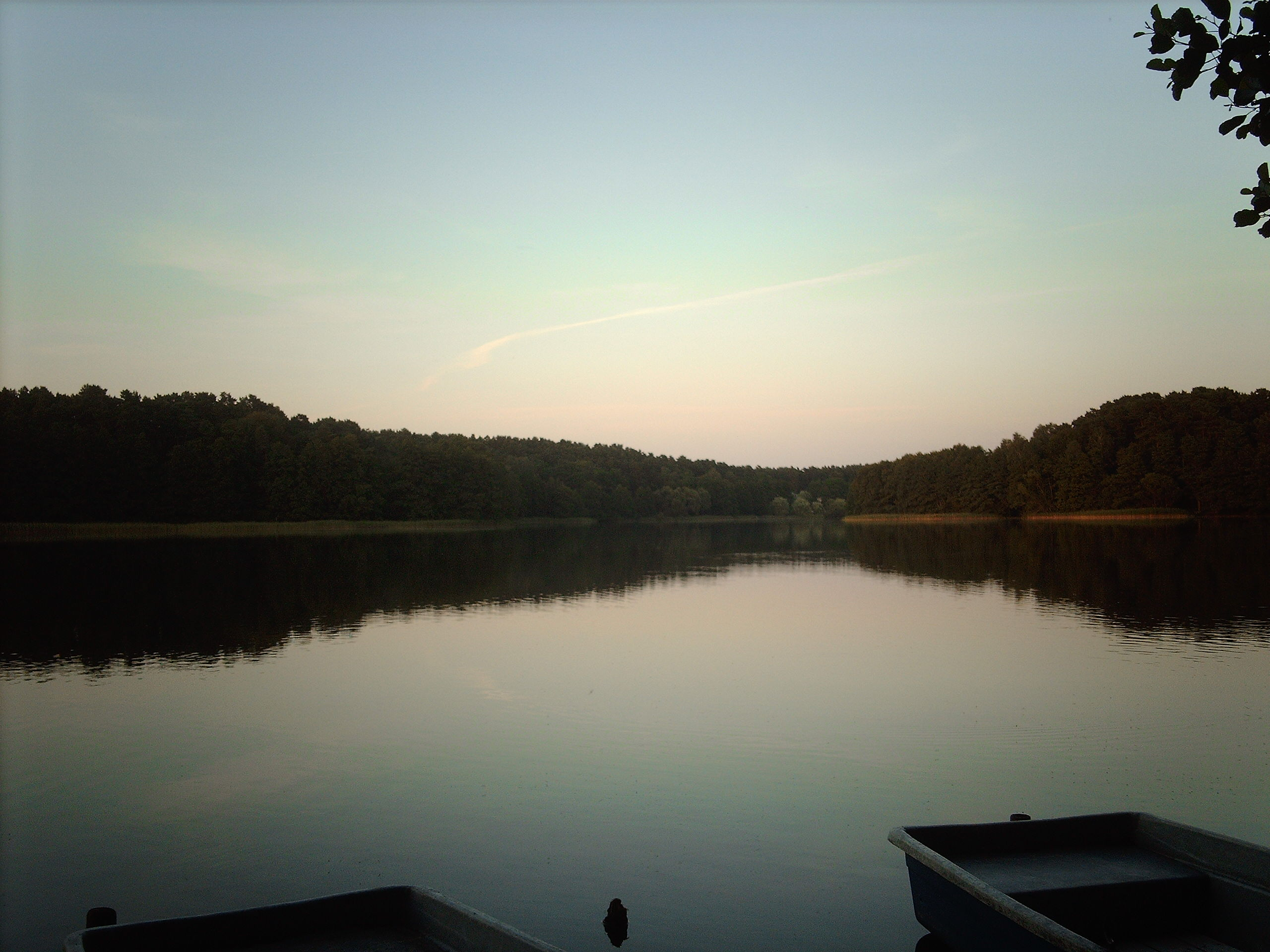

- Location within Brandenburg
- Location: Oberhavel, Brandenburg
- Coordinates: 53°6′38.41″N 13°2′6.08″E
- Primary outflows: Polzowkanal
- Basin countries: Germany
- Surface area: 0.56 km^{2} (0.22 sq mi)
- Max. depth: 19 m (62 ft)

Roofensee is a lake in Oberhavel, Brandenburg, Germany. It has a surface area of 0.56 km^{2}.

== Overview ==
Roofensee (Lake Roofen) is located in the county of Oberhavel in the north of Brandenburg, about 6 km from the border of Mecklenburg-Vorpommern. It has an elongated shape, in a northwest–southeast direction, covering of an area of 0.56 square kilometers and is up to 19 meters deep. Roofensee is part of the Stechlin-Ruppiner Land Nature Park. It is situated in the district of Stechlin and at its southeastern end is the village of Menz.

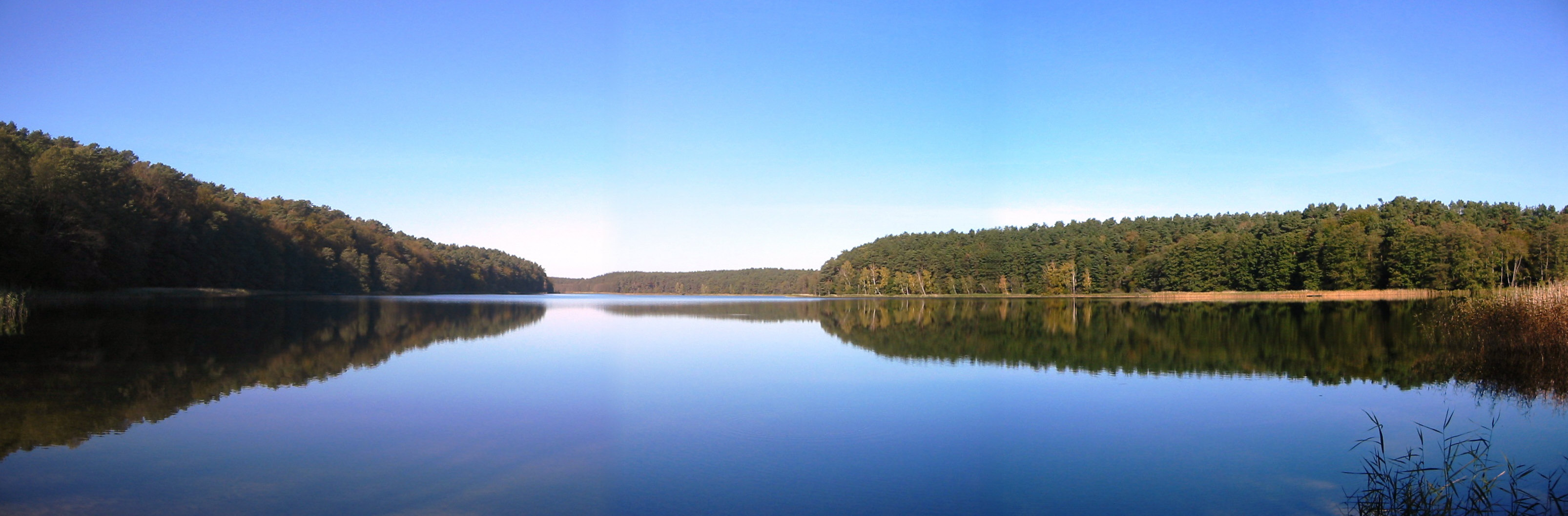

There is a 6 km path around the lake. Over a part of this path there is also a 12 km marsh trail that leads beyond the lake into the surrounding forest area. It contains five stations, some of which are suitable for disabled people, and which were partly completed in 2007. The complete marsh trail was opened on 26 June 2008.

Roofensee is connected to other waterways by the Polzowkanal. To the east it connects with both the small and large Wentowsee (Lake Wentow) and the River Havel, and on the west with the Nehmitzsee (Lake Nehmitz) and Stechlinsee (Lake Stechlin).
