= Zernikow =

Zernikow may refer to several places in Brandenburg, Germany:

- Zernikow (Großwoltersdorf), part of Großwoltersdorf municipality near Gransee
- Zernikow (Nordwestuckermark), part of Nordwestuckermark municipality near Prenzlau
- Zernikow (Plattenburg), part of Plattenburg municipality near Bad Wilsnack
