= Briese =

River in Germany

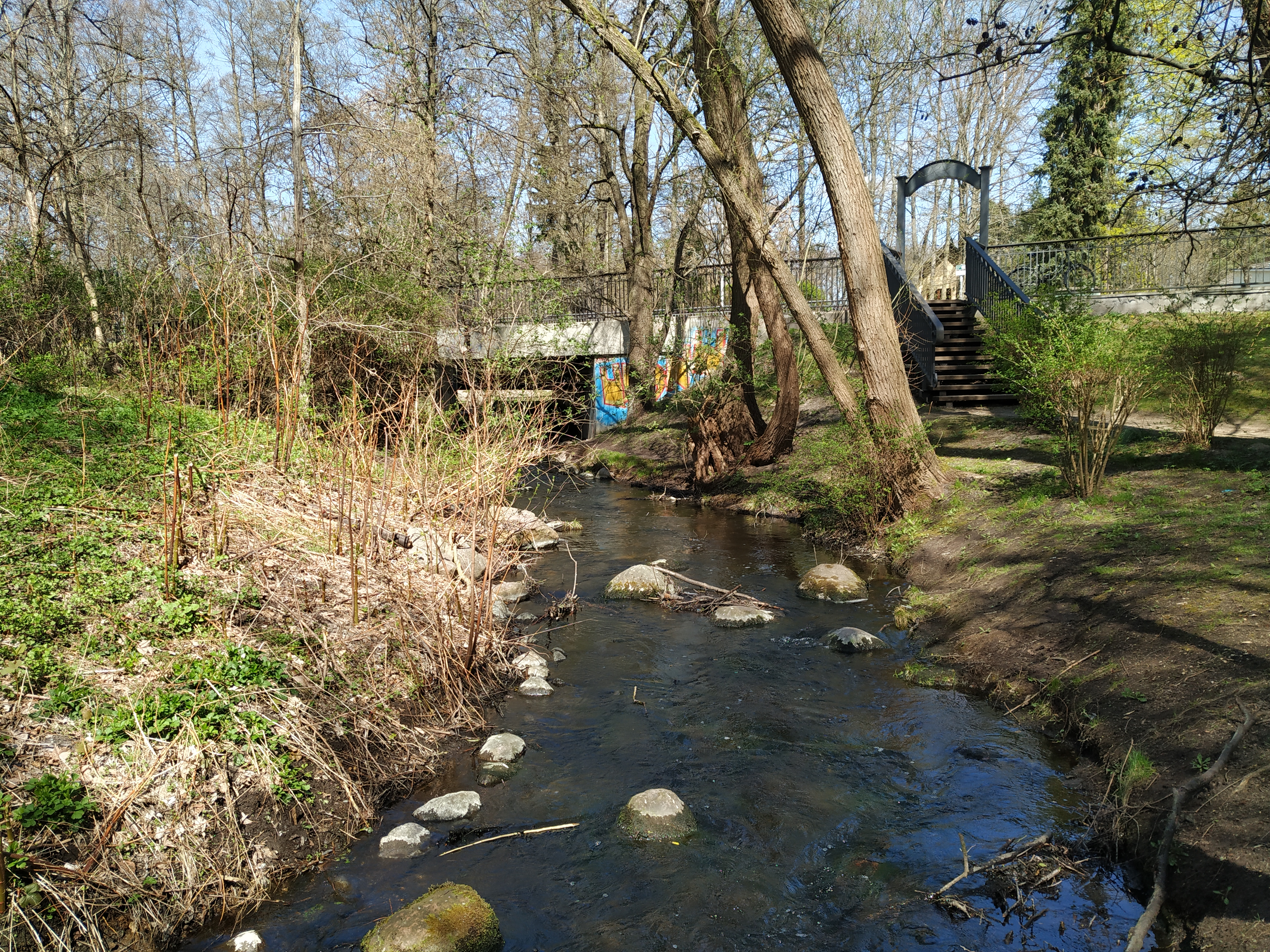

Location
- Country: Germany
- State: Brandenburg

Physical characteristics
- Source
  - location: Wandlitzer See
  - coordinates: 52.6880°N 13.2540°E
- Mouth
  - location: Havel
  - coordinates: 52.6880°N 13.2540°E

Basin features
- Progression: Havel→ Elbe→ North Sea

Briese is a river of Brandenburg, Germany, flowing through the districts (German: Kreise) Barnim and Oberhavel.

The Briese springs from the lake Wandlitzer See. It is a tributary of the River Havel, which it joins in Birkenwerder. The Briese and surrounding forests (Briesetal, Briese valley) are a tourist attraction in Birkenwerder, being used by people from the surrounding areas and Berlin to go on hikes.

== See also ==
- List of rivers of Brandenburg
