= Emma Trosse =

German poet

- Born: Emma Johanna Elisabeth Trosse; 6 January 1863; Gransee, Kingdom of Prussia
- Died: 23 July 1949 (aged 86); Bad Neuenahr, West Germany
- Other names: Emma Külz-Trosse, Emma Külz
- Occupation(s): educator, clinician, sexologist
- Years active: 1890s–1936
- Known for: publishing the first treatise by a woman on homosexuality

Emma Trosse (6 January 1863 – 23 July 1949) was a German teacher and school administrator. Trained as a teacher and later passing an examination to be a principal, Trosse began her career working in public schools and as a private tutor. In 1895, she published one of the first scientific works on homosexuality and advocated for legal protections for homosexuals. She was the first known woman to scientifically discuss lesbianism. She also published books analyzing ancient medical practices in medieval Europe, and among the Greeks and Egyptians. After her marriage, she became a clinician in her husband's diabetes clinic, and began writing literature on diabetes.

== Early life ==
Emma Johanna Elisabeth Trosse was born on 6 January 1863 in Gransee, in the Kingdom of Prussia, a part of the German Confederation to Emma Emilie Therese (née Böther) and Friedrich Trosse. Early in her life Trosse demonstrated an ability as a polyglot and became proficient in seven languages. Though little is known of her early life, she came from a family of educational theorists. After attending school in Bromberg and passing her examinations, she went on to further her study at the women's gymnasium. She attended lectures in philology at the Frederick William University in Berlin in the 1880s and 1890s, having to hide behind a curtain to attend lectures, as women were barred from higher education.

== Career ==
Trosse began her career working as a teacher at the Gransee public school and then taught at the women's gymnasium in Gnesen. Her next position was as a governess/teacher in Schneidlingen near Magdeburg, and then she taught in the public school of Obernkirchen in the Bückeberg hills. Returning to Hanover, she passed the examination for school principals in Hannover, and began work as the director of the women's gymnasium and boarding school in Würzburg. Going on holiday to the Ahr Valley, she became enamored of the area, resigned her position in Würzburg, and began to publish poetry about the local area. In 1893, she opened a girl's boarding school with Hermine Dulsmann, the Baroness von Bardeleben, in Bad Neuenahr.

In 1895, Trosse began publishing a series of works examining homosexuality and seeking to redefine the scientific definition of natural sexuality. Her first publication Der Konträrsexualismus in Bezug auf Ehe und Frauenfrage (Contrary-sexuality in relation to marriage and the women question), was the first work written by a German woman on the topic. She was the first known woman to write scientifically about lesbianism. Her study, published a year before Magnus Hirschfeld's first publishings, and prior to those of Johanna Elberskirchen and Anna Rüling, argued that homosexuality was a natural state and a diversity which appeared in nature. She argued that same-sex attraction and asexuality were not abnormal or exceptions to natural order and as such, homosexual people should not be discriminated against and the state should take measures protect people's right to sexual freedom. She saw sexual binarism as a moralistic position, rather than a scientific one. This first publication was followed by two additional treatments of the topic, Ein Weib? Psychologisch-biographische: Studie über eine Konträrsexuelle (A woman? Psychological-biographical study of a contrary-sexual, 1897) and Ist 'freie Liebe' Sittenlosigkeit? (Is 'free love' immoral? 1897, 2nd ed. 1900). Censorship quickly banned the articles as immoral in Austria-Hungary, the German Empire and Russia.

In 1896, Trosse published two articles in English on ancient medical knowledge written about by Alexander of Tralles, Burnt Substances and Sources of the Drugs Supplied to the Greeks. She also published information about both Egyptian and medieval medical practices in Norway. Around 1897 or 1898, she met the Dr. Georg Alexander Constantin Külz, whom she would marry in 1900. Soon after meeting Külz, she published a book of poetry, Was die Ahr rauscht (Why the Ahr Rushes, 1899). Because German law forbade married women to teach, she lost her employment upon her marriage and became a clinician in the diabetes clinic the couple founded. The clinic was the first one in the area to treat diabetic patients. After their daughter, Irmgard was born in 1902, Külz-Trosse performed work in the clinic laboratory and continued to publish, under the name of E. Külz or E. Külz-Trosse. In one article, published jointly with her husband, Das Breslauer Arzneibuch (Medicine of Breslau), they analyzed medieval medical practices in Breslau.

In 1923, after returning from the war, her husband died and his cousin, Ludwig Külz moved to Bad Neuenahr to take over operation of the clinic. His morphine addiction impaired his abilities, and Külz-Trosse struggled with keeping the facility open, until her daughter married a physician, Erwin Quednow, who took over running the clinic. She took care of the couple's five children and continued publishing medical articles. In 1930, she published Dauerheilung der Zuckerkrankheit (Endurance of diabetes) and in 1936 Trwałe wyleczenie cukrzycy (Persistent cure of diabetes (Polish)).

== Death and legacy ==
Külz-Trosse lost her sight as she aged and was completely blind by the time of her death on 23 July 1949 in Bad Neuenahr. In 2010, the Schwules Museum held an exhibit to honor her pioneering work in sexology. In 2011, the exhibit was shown to honor her in Mannheim.
