= Hohen Neuendorf =

- Town
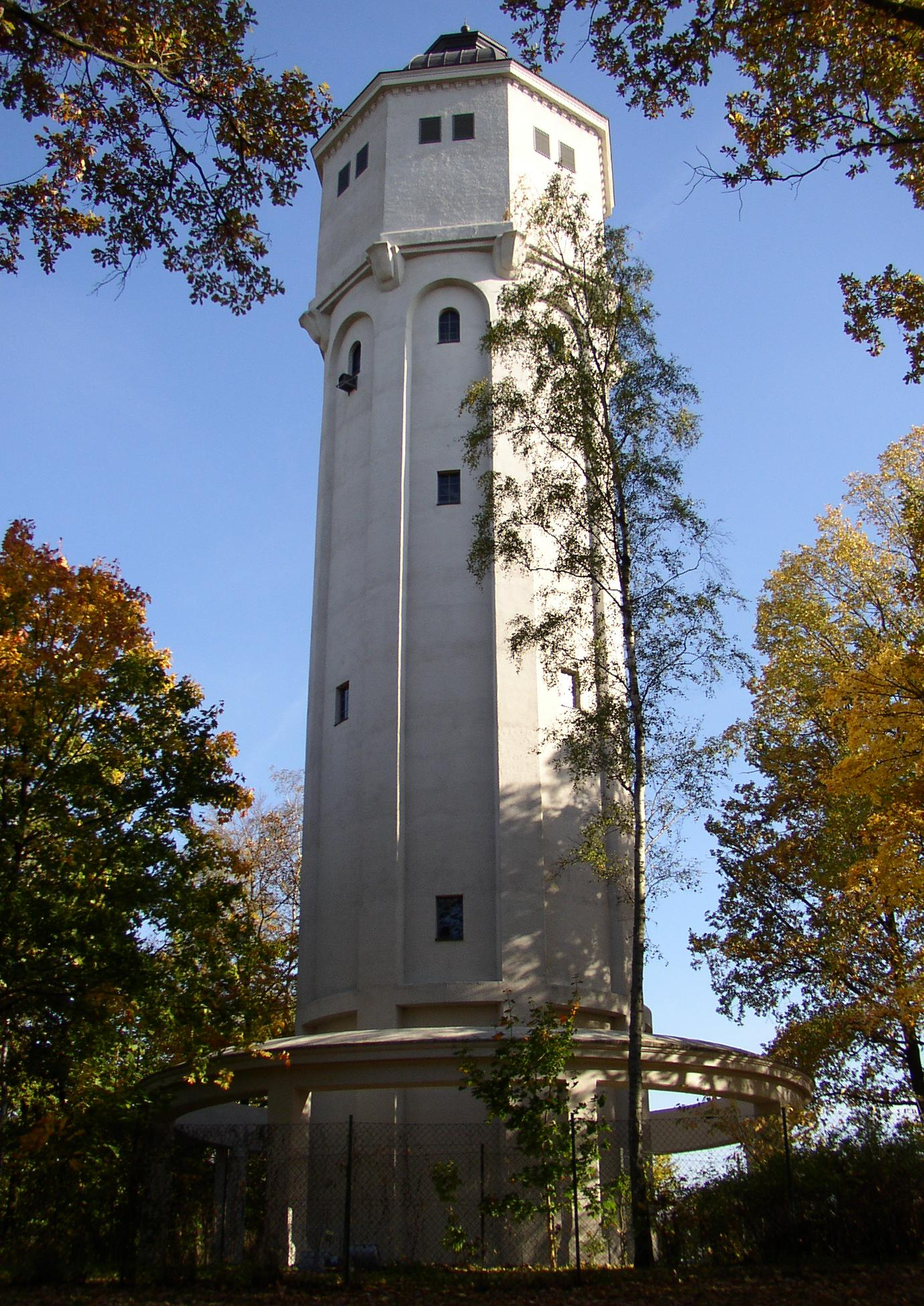
- Water tower

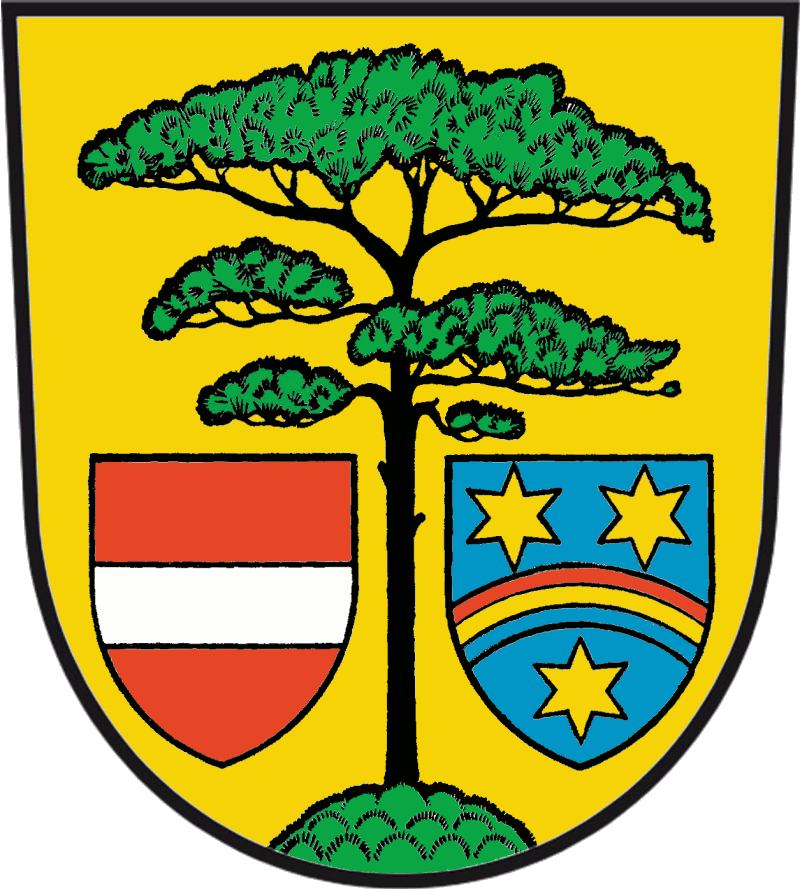
- Coat of arms

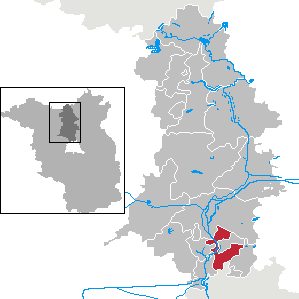
- Location of Hohen Neuendorf within Oberhavel district
- Interactive map of Hohen Neuendorf
- Location within Germany Location within Brandenburg
- Coordinates: 52°40′N 13°17′E
- Country: Germany
- State: Brandenburg
- District: Oberhavel
- Subdivisions: 4 districts

Government
  - Mayor (2023–31): Steffen Apelt (CDU)

Area
  - Total: 48.56 km^{2} (18.75 sq mi)
- Elevation: 32–66 m (105–217 ft)

Population (2025-12-31)
  - Total: 26,819
  - Density: 552.3/km^{2} (1,430/sq mi)
- Time zone: UTC+01:00 (CET)
  - Summer (DST): UTC+02:00 (CEST)
- Postal codes: 16540, 16556, 16562
- Dialling codes: 03303
- Vehicle registration: OHV
- Website: hohen-neuendorf.de

Hohen Neuendorf (German pronunciation: [ˈhoːən ˈnɔʏənˌdɔʁf]) is a town in the Oberhavel district, in Brandenburg, Germany. It is located north west of Berlin.

== Geography ==
Hohen Neuendorf is situated upon the Havel river (built on the Oder-Havel Canal) and is bordered by the Berlin areas Frohnau and Heiligensee to the south, Mühlenbecker Land to the east, Birkenwerder and Oranienburg to the north, and Hennigsdorf and Velten to the west.

=== Division of the town ===
Hohen Neuendorf consists of 4 districts:

- Hohen Neuendorf and its districts (Wohnplätze) Elseneck and Niederheide (area code: 16540)
- Stolpe (area code: 16540)
- Borgsdorf and its districts Pinnow, Weißes Haus and Havelhausen (area code: 16556)
- Bergfelde (area code: 16562)

== Demography ==
Development of population since 1875 within the current boundaries (blue line: population; dotted line: comparison to population development of Brandenburg state; grey background: time of Nazi rule; red background: time of communist rule)

Recent population development and projections (population development before 2011 census (blue line); recent population development according to the Census in Germany in 2011 (blue bordered line); official projections for 2005–2030 (yellow line); for 2014–2030 (red line); for 2017–2030 (scarlet line)

Hohen Neuendorf: Population development
within the current boundaries (2020)

Year	Pop.	±% p.a.
1875	779	—
1890	1,074	+2.16%
1910	3,953	+6.73%
1925	8,175	+4.96%
1933	11,725	+4.61%
1939	16,498	+5.86%
1946	15,531	−0.86%
1950	16,373	+1.33%
1964	16,207	−0.07%
1971	16,115	−0.08%
1981	15,581	−0.34%
1985	15,310	−0.44%
1989	14,435	−1.46%
1990	14,188	−1.71%
1991	13,957	−1.63%

Year	Pop.	±% p.a.
1992	13,704	−1.81%
1993	13,760	+0.41%
1994	13,975	+1.56%
1995	14,390	+2.97%
1996	15,177	+5.47%
1997	16,338	+7.65%
1998	17,611	+7.79%
1999	18,682	+6.08%
2000	19,338	+3.51%
2001	19,714	+1.94%
2002	20,451	+3.74%
2003	21,168	+3.51%
2004	21,920	+3.55%
2005	22,617	+3.18%
2006	23,337	+3.18%

Year	Pop.	±% p.a.
2007	23,549	+0.91%
2008	23,909	+1.53%
2009	24,139	+0.96%
2010	24,384	+1.01%
2011	24,585	+0.82%
2012	24,905	+1.30%
2013	25,001	+0.39%
2014	25,239	+0.95%
2015	25,519	+1.11%
2016	25,696	+0.69%
2017	26,001	+1.19%
2018	26,159	+0.61%
2019	26,283	+0.47%
2020	26,380	+0.37%

== History ==
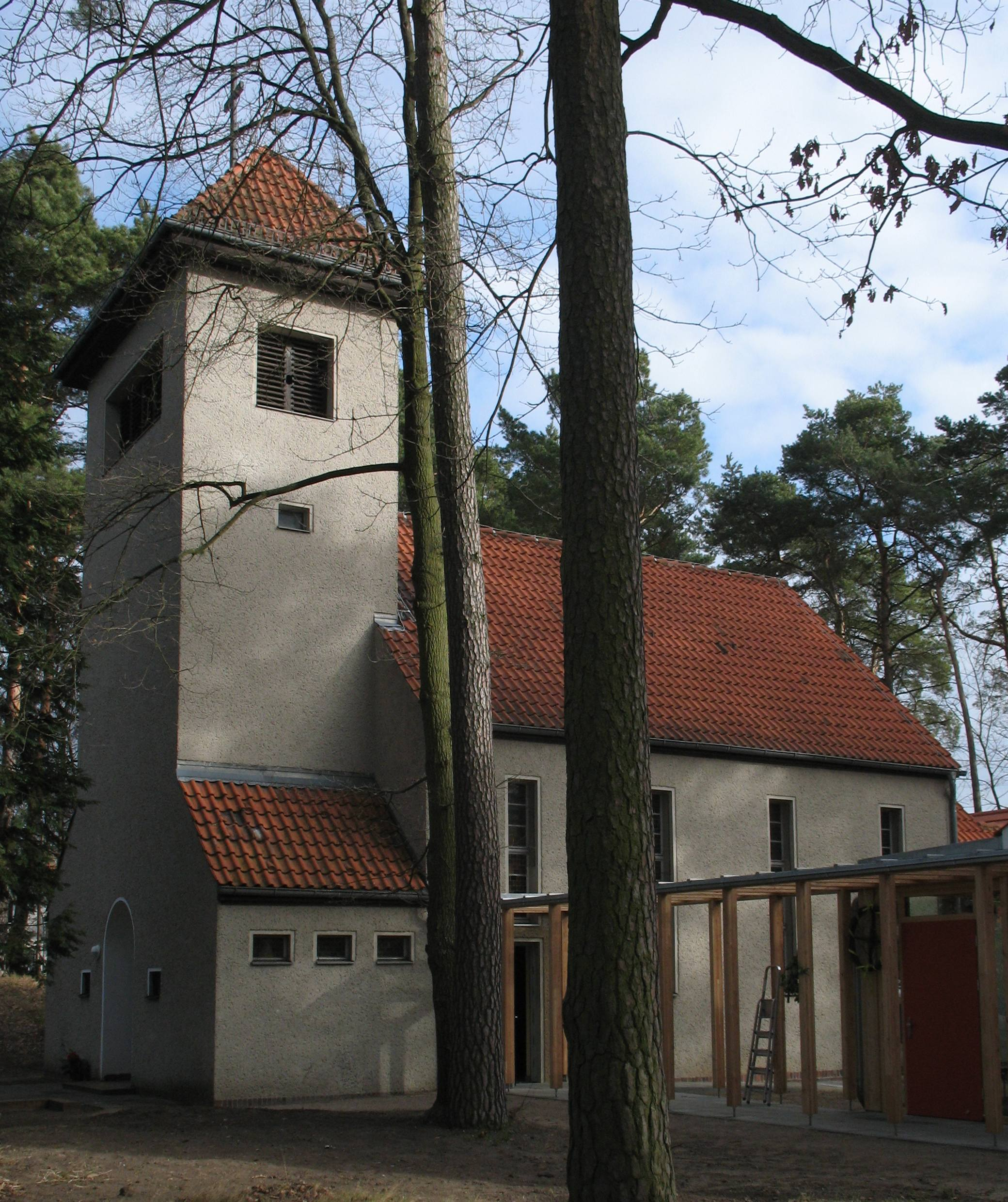
Church in Bergfelde

Since the suburban move of Berlin which ended in the late 19th century, allowed by the development of the railway, Hohen Neuendorf was a small town with few residents.

The creation of a train station in Hohen Neuendorf on the North Train from Berlin in the last quarter of the 19th century, thanks to the larger, richer nearby village of Stolpe, led to a quick development of Hohen Neuendorf paralleled to that occurring in Berlin. With the rising role of Hohen Neuendorf as a commuter village across from Stolpe (which stayed largely agricultural in nature), it was finally with the (mis)placement of the train stop that emphasis on the settlement of Hohen Neuendorf ensued. The new Hohen Neuendorf station today is frequented by the users of Berlin's S-Bahn (rapid railway), while the old station's building has now been changed into a hotel.

=== West Berlin border crossing ===
The municipality shared its borders with the former West Berlin, and so during 1961-1990 it was separated from it by the Berlin Wall. Between 1 January 1988 and 30 June 1990 Hohen Neuendorf's component village of Stolpe served as East German border crossing for cars travelling between West Berlin and the East German Democratic Republic) or the West German Federal Republic of Germany. The traffic was subject to the Interzonal traffic regulations, which followed the special regulations of the Transit Agreement for traffic between West Germany and West Berlin. After 9 November 1989 eastern controls were gradually eased into spot checks and finally abolished on 30 June 1990, the day the Monetary, Economic and Social Union between the GDR and the FRG was introduced.

== Twin towns – sister cities ==
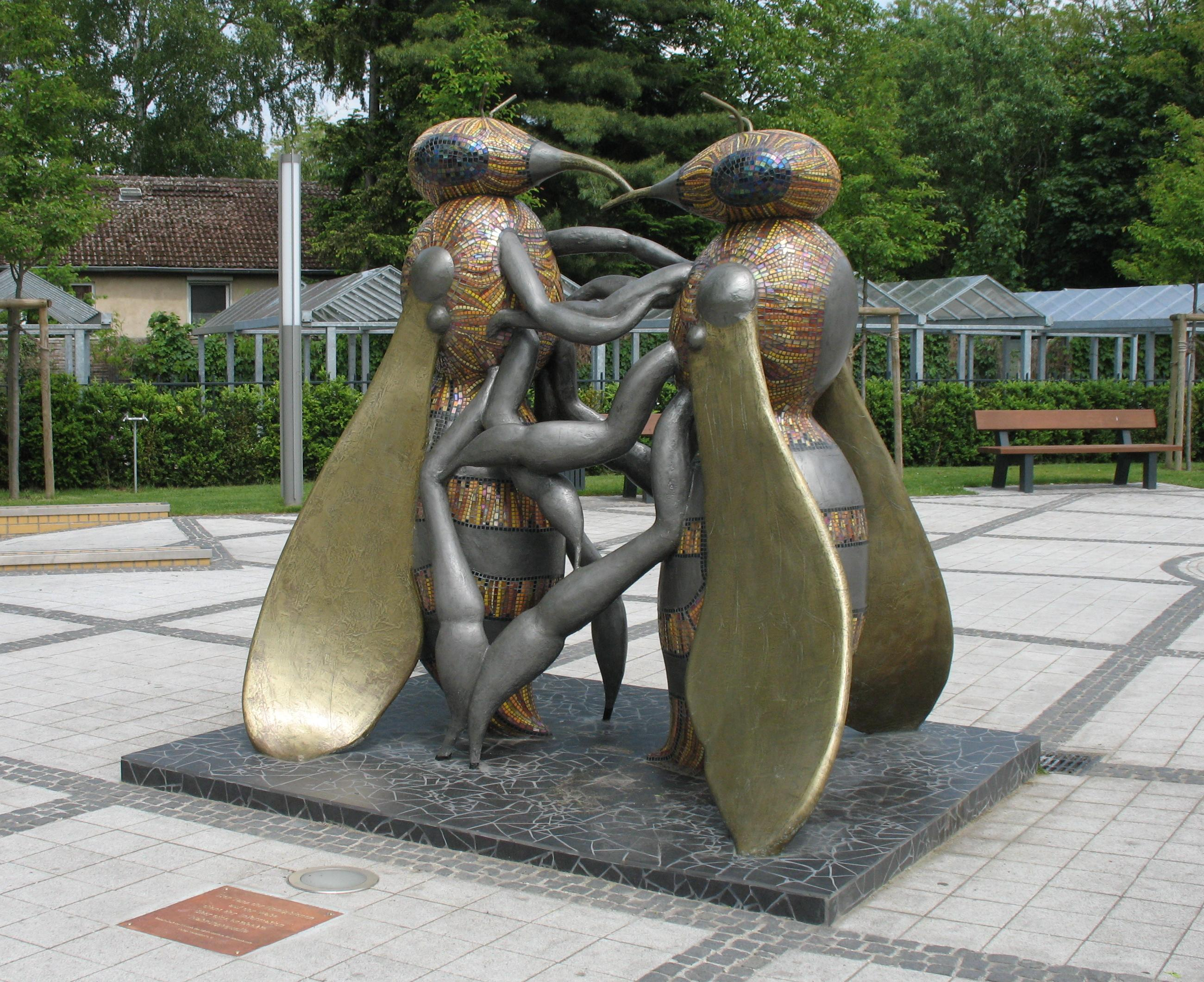
Honey bee memorial

Hohen Neuendorf is twinned with:

- Bergerac, France
- Fürstenau, Germany
- Janów Podlaski, Poland
- Müllheim, Germany

From 1992 to 2017 Hohen Neuendorf was twinned with Maing, France.

== Sport ==
The RU Hohen Neuendorf, a rugby union club, competes at the second tier of German club rugby, the 2nd Rugby-Bundesliga North/East, having earned promotion to the league in 2008.
