= Schönermark =

- Municipality
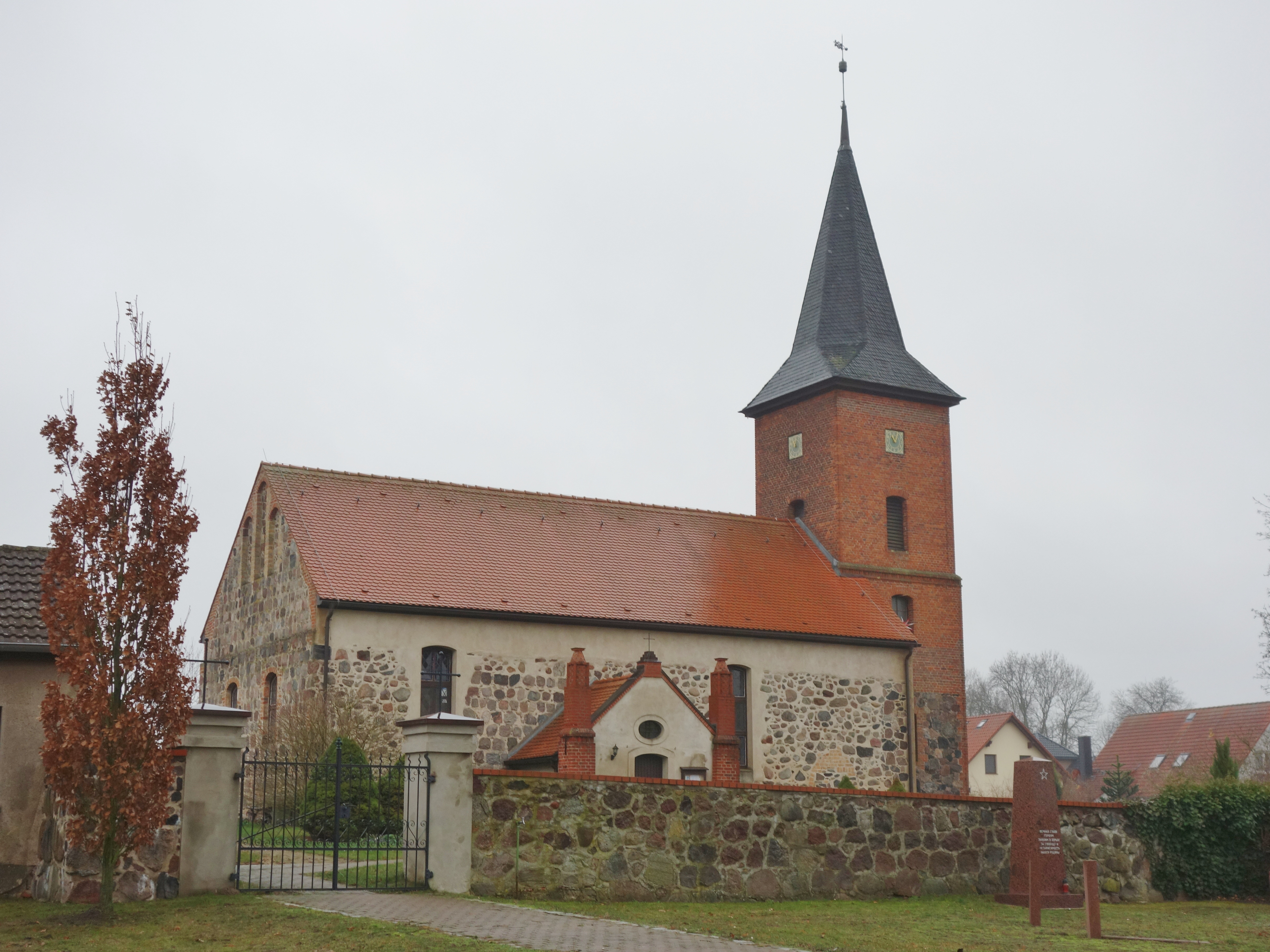

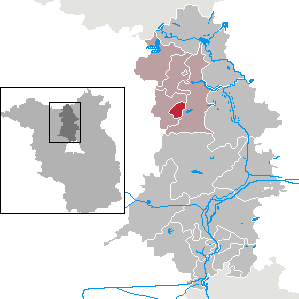
- Location of Schönermark within Oberhavel district
- Interactive map of Schönermark
- Location within Germany Location within Brandenburg
- Coordinates: 53°00′25″N 13°07′19″E
- Country: Germany
- State: Brandenburg
- District: Oberhavel
- Municipal assoc.: Gransee und Gemeinden

Government
  - Mayor (2024–29): Dominik Wegert

Area
  - Total: 11.85 km^{2} (4.58 sq mi)
- Elevation: 72 m (236 ft)

Population (2025-12-31)
  - Total: 409
  - Density: 34.5/km^{2} (89.4/sq mi)
- Time zone: UTC+01:00 (CET)
  - Summer (DST): UTC+02:00 (CEST)
- Postal codes: 16775
- Dialling codes: 033082
- Vehicle registration: OHV
- Website: Gemeinde Schönermark

Schönermark is a municipality in the Oberhavel district, in Brandenburg, Germany.

== Demography ==
Development of population since 1875 within the current boundaries (Blue line: Population; Dotted line: Comparison to population development of Brandenburg state; Grey background: Time of Nazi rule; Red background: Time of communist rule)

Schönermark: Population development
within the current boundaries (2020)

Year	Pop.	±% p.a.
1875	246	—
1890	270	+0.62%
1910	277	+0.13%
1925	324	+1.05%
1933	334	+0.38%
1939	327	−0.35%
1946	525	+7.00%
1950	530	+0.24%
1964	389	−2.19%
1971	403	+0.51%
1981	379	−0.61%
1985	486	+6.41%
1989	486	+0.00%
1990	494	+1.65%
1991	485	−1.82%

Year	Pop.	±% p.a.
1992	496	+2.27%
1993	479	−3.43%
1994	466	−2.71%
1995	459	−1.50%
1996	489	+6.54%
1997	463	−5.32%
1998	474	+2.38%
1999	486	+2.53%
2000	496	+2.06%
2001	523	+5.44%
2002	522	−0.19%
2003	521	−0.19%
2004	502	−3.65%
2005	499	−0.60%
2006	481	−3.61%

Year	Pop.	±% p.a.
2007	459	−4.57%
2008	449	−2.18%
2009	451	+0.45%
2010	429	−4.88%
2011	432	+0.70%
2012	430	−0.46%
2013	432	+0.47%
2014	415	−3.94%
2015	446	+7.47%
2016	449	+0.67%
2017	451	+0.45%
2018	449	−0.44%
2019	459	+2.23%
2020	451	−1.74%
