= Neuroofen =

Hamlet in the Stechlin district of Germany

Coordinates: 53.126°N 13.070°E

Neuroofen is a small hamlet of around 25 people in the Stechlin district of Germany. It lies in the area between Menz and Altglobsow and is surrounded by the forests and lakes of the Furstenberg Conservation Area and the Stechlin-Ruppiner Land Nature Park.

== History ==
In 1851 the owner of the Neuglobsow glassworks began to buy up land in the surrounding area. Neuroofen lay in the midst of this land. The 560-acre estate was sold in 1896/99 to the Prussian Forest Administration, which moved the forestry office and various establishments there.

In the middle of the 18th century the Prussian Administration asked what could be done with the Menzer Forest. The Head Forestry Officer said that there was so much wood that it could never be used up. 30 years later nearly all the wood had been burnt in the chimneys of Berlin. The forest was replanted and today the District Forestry Office, located in Neuroofen, is mainly concerned with the ecological protection and renewal of the forest, as well carrying out research work.

Up until the formation of the German Democratic Republic the forestry service was involved in training forestry workers and producing charcoal. Up until the re-unification of Germany it was one of the main Institutes for Forest Technology in Brandenburg.

Since 1992, the Government Forestry Service has assumed control of the Forestry Office operations, while the previous training facilities have been privatized. These facilities now serve as centers for the sale and repair of technical machinery used in forestry operations.

In 2000 the main buildings of the former training facility changed hands and are now used for holiday apartments and as a seminar centre.
