= Leegebruch =

- Municipality
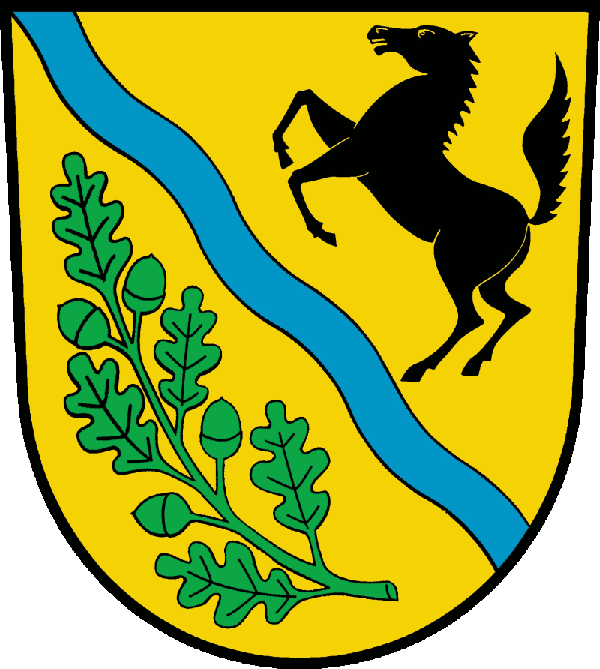
- Coat of arms

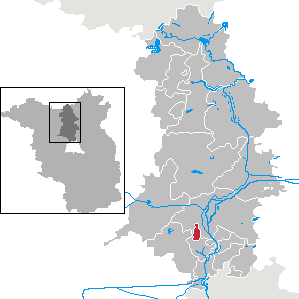
- Location of Leegebruch within Oberhavel district
- Interactive map of Leegebruch
- Location within Germany Location within Brandenburg
- Coordinates: 52°43′N 13°12′E
- Country: Germany
- State: Brandenburg
- District: Oberhavel

Government
  - Mayor (2019–27): Martin Rother (CDU)

Area
  - Total: 6.44 km^{2} (2.49 sq mi)
- Elevation: 33 m (108 ft)

Population (2025-12-31)
  - Total: 6,734
  - Density: 1,050/km^{2} (2,710/sq mi)
- Time zone: UTC+01:00 (CET)
  - Summer (DST): UTC+02:00 (CEST)
- Postal codes: 16767
- Dialling codes: 03304
- Vehicle registration: OHV
- Website: www.leegebruch.de

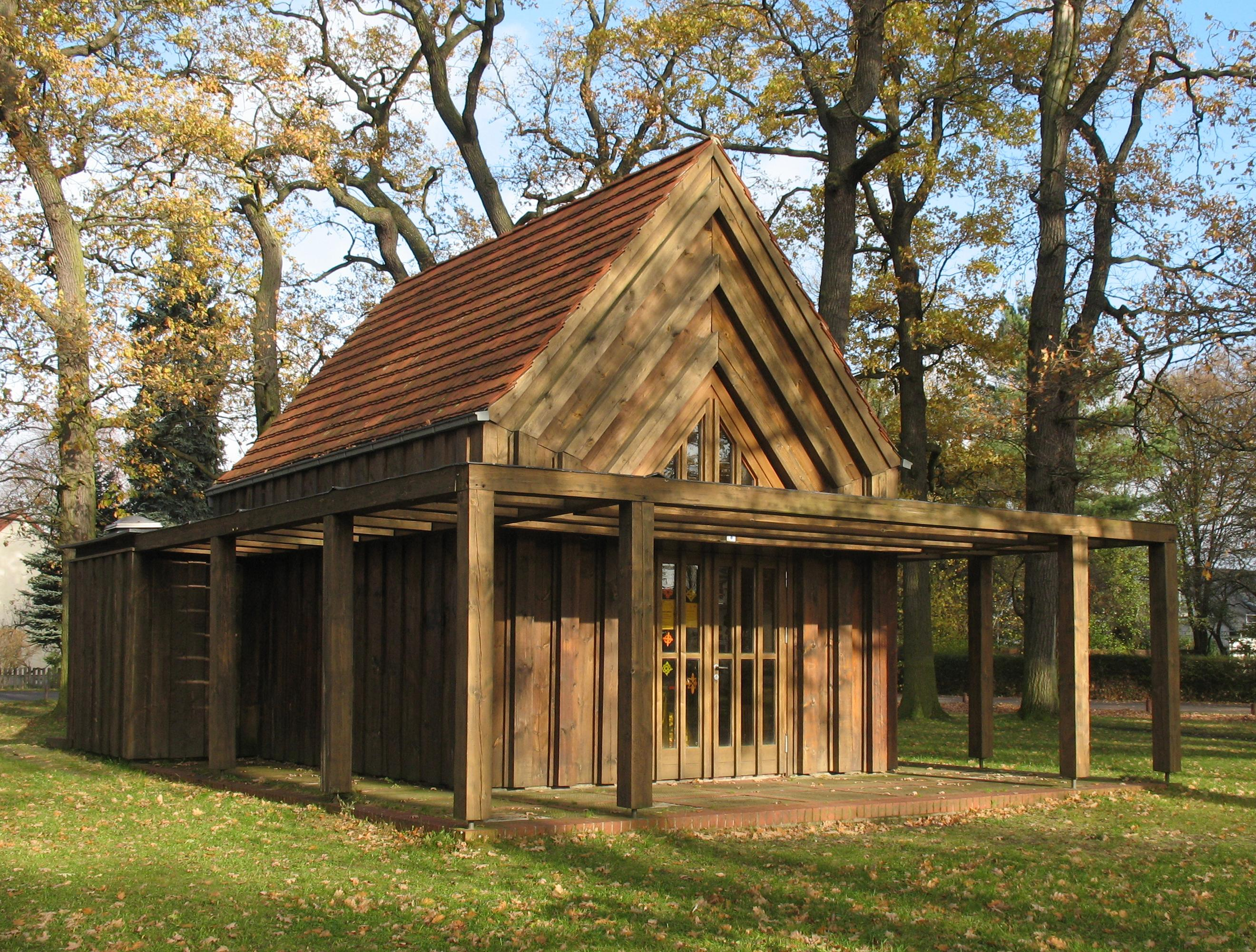
Chapel

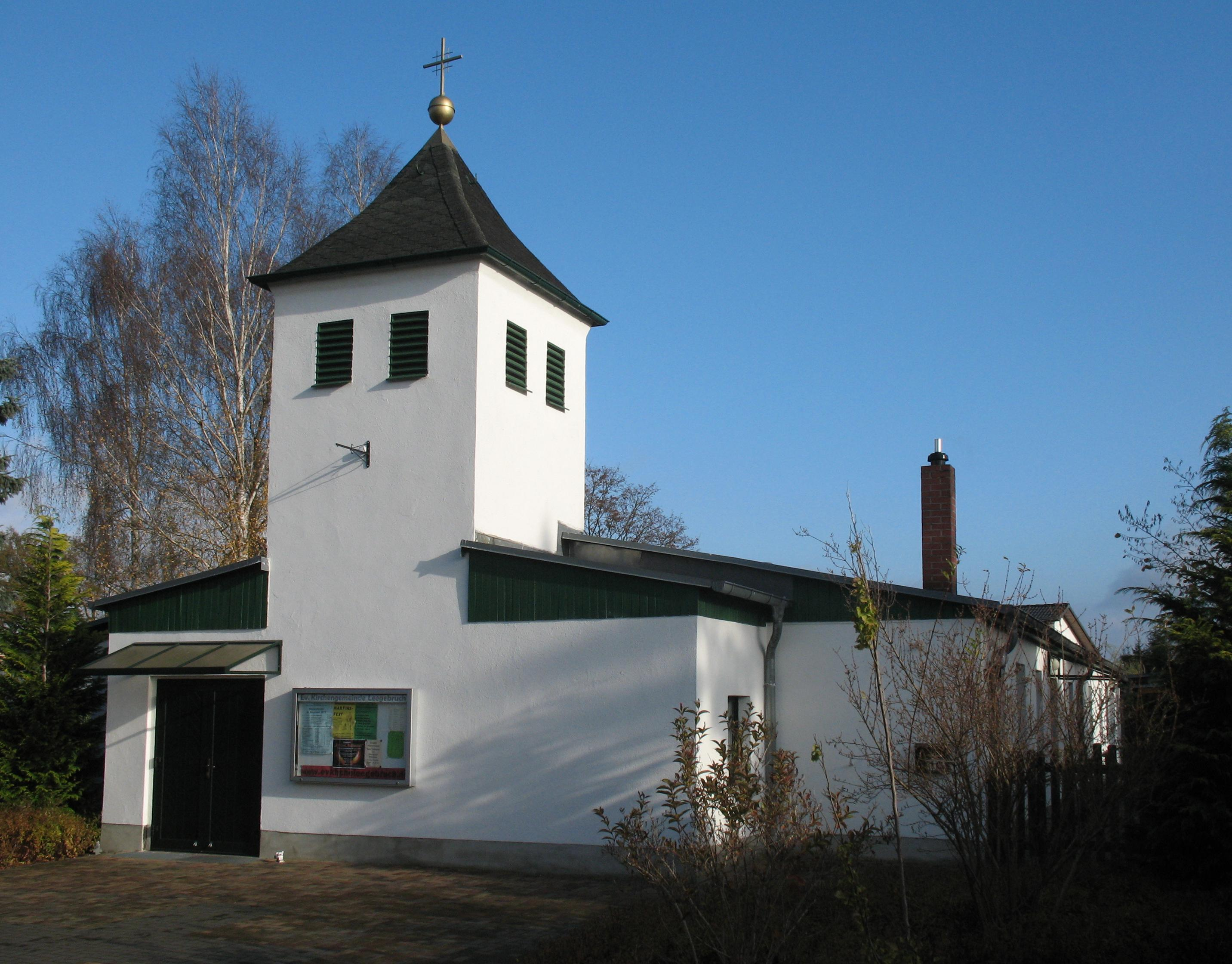
Church

Leegebruch is a municipality in the Oberhavel district, in Brandenburg, Germany.

== Demography ==
Development of Population since 1875 within the Current Boundaries (Blue Line: Population; Dotted Line: Comparison to Population Development of Brandenburg state; Grey Background: Time of Nazi rule; Red Background: Time of Communist rule))

Recent Population Development and Projections (Population Development before Census 2011 (blue line); Recent Population Development according to the Census in Germany in 2011 (blue bordered line); Official projections for 2005-2030 (yellow line); for 2014-2030 (red line); for 2017-2030 (scarlet line)

Leegebruch: Population development
within the current boundaries (2020)

| Year | Pop. | ±% p.a. |
|---|---|---|
| 1875 | 54 | — |
| 1890 | 100 | +4.19% |
| 1910 | 150 | +2.05% |
| 1925 | 222 | +2.65% |
| 1933 | 350 | +5.86% |
| 1939 | 5,074 | +56.15% |
| 1946 | 5,554 | +1.30% |
| 1950 | 5,871 | +1.40% |
| 1964 | 5,387 | −0.61% |
| 1971 | 5,133 | −0.69% |
| 1981 | 4,524 | −1.25% |
| 1985 | 4,458 | −0.37% |
| 1989 | 4,253 | −1.17% |
| 1990 | 4,180 | −1.72% |
| 1991 | 4,076 | −2.49% |

| Year | Pop. | ±% p.a. |
|---|---|---|
| 1992 | 4,052 | −0.59% |
| 1993 | 4,163 | +2.74% |
| 1994 | 4,708 | +13.09% |
| 1995 | 5,144 | +9.26% |
| 1996 | 5,538 | +7.66% |
| 1997 | 5,771 | +4.21% |
| 1998 | 6,113 | +5.93% |
| 1999 | 6,221 | +1.77% |
| 2000 | 6,338 | +1.88% |
| 2001 | 6,440 | +1.61% |
| 2002 | 6,499 | +0.92% |
| 2003 | 6,521 | +0.34% |
| 2004 | 6,615 | +1.44% |
| 2005 | 6,671 | +0.85% |
| 2006 | 6,695 | +0.36% |

| Year | Pop. | ±% p.a. |
|---|---|---|
| 2007 | 6,680 | −0.22% |
| 2008 | 6,701 | +0.31% |
| 2009 | 6,653 | −0.72% |
| 2010 | 6,622 | −0.47% |
| 2011 | 6,599 | −0.35% |
| 2012 | 6,615 | +0.24% |
| 2013 | 6,573 | −0.63% |
| 2014 | 6,567 | −0.09% |
| 2015 | 6,678 | +1.69% |
| 2016 | 6,755 | +1.15% |
| 2017 | 6,785 | +0.44% |
| 2018 | 6,870 | +1.25% |
| 2019 | 6,920 | +0.73% |
| 2020 | 6,957 | +0.53% |
