= Gransee =

- Municipality
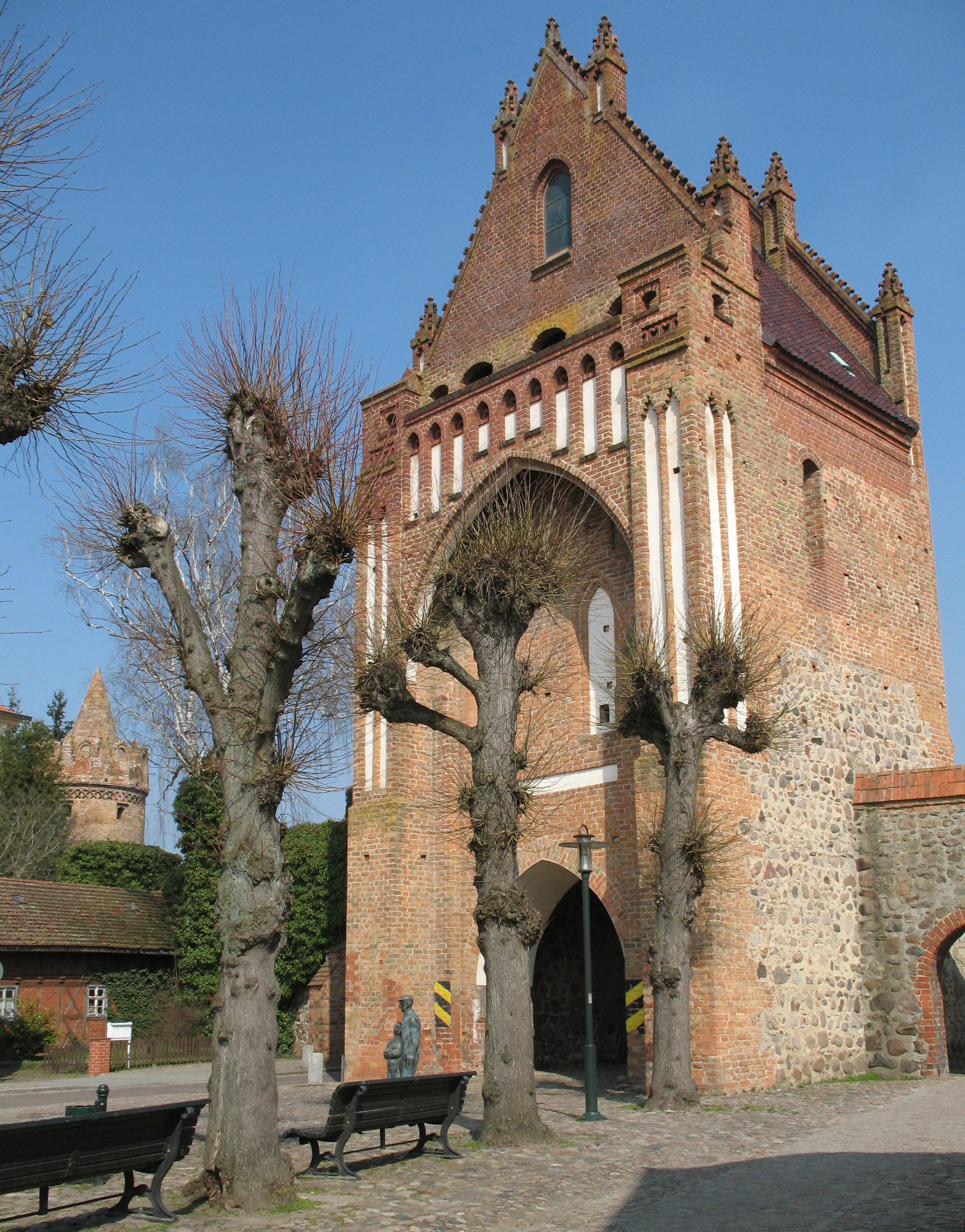
- City gate

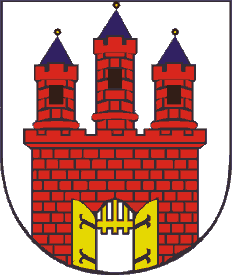
- Coat of arms

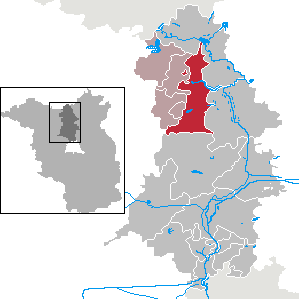
- Location of Gransee within Oberhavel district
- Interactive map of Gransee
- Location within Germany Location within Brandenburg
- Coordinates: 53°00′25″N 13°09′31″E
- Country: Germany
- State: Brandenburg
- District: Oberhavel
- Municipal assoc.: Gransee und Gemeinden
- Subdivisions: 13 districts

Government
  - Mayor (2024–29): Andreas Hirtzel (CDU)

Area
  - Total: 121.68 km^{2} (46.98 sq mi)
- Elevation: 55 m (180 ft)

Population (2025-12-31)
  - Total: 5,828
  - Density: 47.90/km^{2} (124.1/sq mi)
- Time zone: UTC+01:00 (CET)
  - Summer (DST): UTC+02:00 (CEST)
- Postal codes: 16775
- Dialling codes: 03306
- Vehicle registration: OHV
- Website: www.gransee.de

Gransee (German pronunciation: [ˈɡʁanˌzeː]) is a town in the Oberhavel district, in Brandenburg, Germany. It is situated 20 km south of Fürstenberg/Havel, and 55 km northwest of Berlin. An important monument in the centre of town is the cast-iron and stone Memorial to Queen Luise (Luisendenkmal), which was designed by the German architect Karl Friedrich Schinkel in the neo-gothic style.

A sport airfield is situated in the eastern part of the town. It is one of the major drop zones in the vicinity of Berlin.

== Demography ==
Development of population since 1875 within the current boundaries (Blue line: Population; Dotted line: Comparison to population development of Brandenburg state; Grey background: Time of Nazi rule; Red background: Time of communist rule)

Gransee: Population development
within the current boundaries (2020)

Year	Pop.	±% p.a.
1875	5,656	—
1890	6,223	+0.64%
1910	6,283	+0.05%
1925	6,377	+0.10%
1933	6,470	+0.18%
1939	6,980	+1.27%
1946	9,740	+4.87%
1950	9,225	−1.35%
1964	8,038	−0.98%
1971	7,890	−0.27%
1981	7,797	−0.12%
1985	7,692	−0.34%
1989	7,522	−0.56%
1990	7,488	−0.45%
1991	7,304	−2.46%

Year	Pop.	±% p.a.
1992	7,216	−1.20%
1993	7,129	−1.21%
1994	7,069	−0.84%
1995	6,998	−1.00%
1996	6,946	−0.74%
1997	7,010	+0.92%
1998	6,921	−1.27%
1999	6,855	−0.95%
2000	6,866	+0.16%
2001	6,750	−1.69%
2002	6,610	−2.07%
2003	6,578	−0.48%
2004	6,511	−1.02%
2005	6,405	−1.63%
2006	6,391	−0.22%

Year	Pop.	±% p.a.
2007	6,261	−2.03%
2008	6,125	−2.17%
2009	6,051	−1.21%
2010	5,974	−1.27%
2011	5,926	−0.80%
2012	5,816	−1.86%
2013	5,721	−1.63%
2014	5,717	−0.07%
2015	5,814	+1.70%
2016	5,895	+1.39%
2017	5,896	+0.02%
2018	5,871	−0.42%
2019	5,895	+0.41%
2020	5,849	−0.78%

== Local council ==
The local council has 19 members:

- Christian Democratic Union: 5 seats
- Social Democratic Party of Germany: 5 seats
- The Left: 3 seats
- Voters association Gransee: 3 seats
- Voters association Citizens for Gransee: 2 seats
- Mayor: 1 seat

Local elections in Brandenburg May 25, 2014

== Photogallery ==
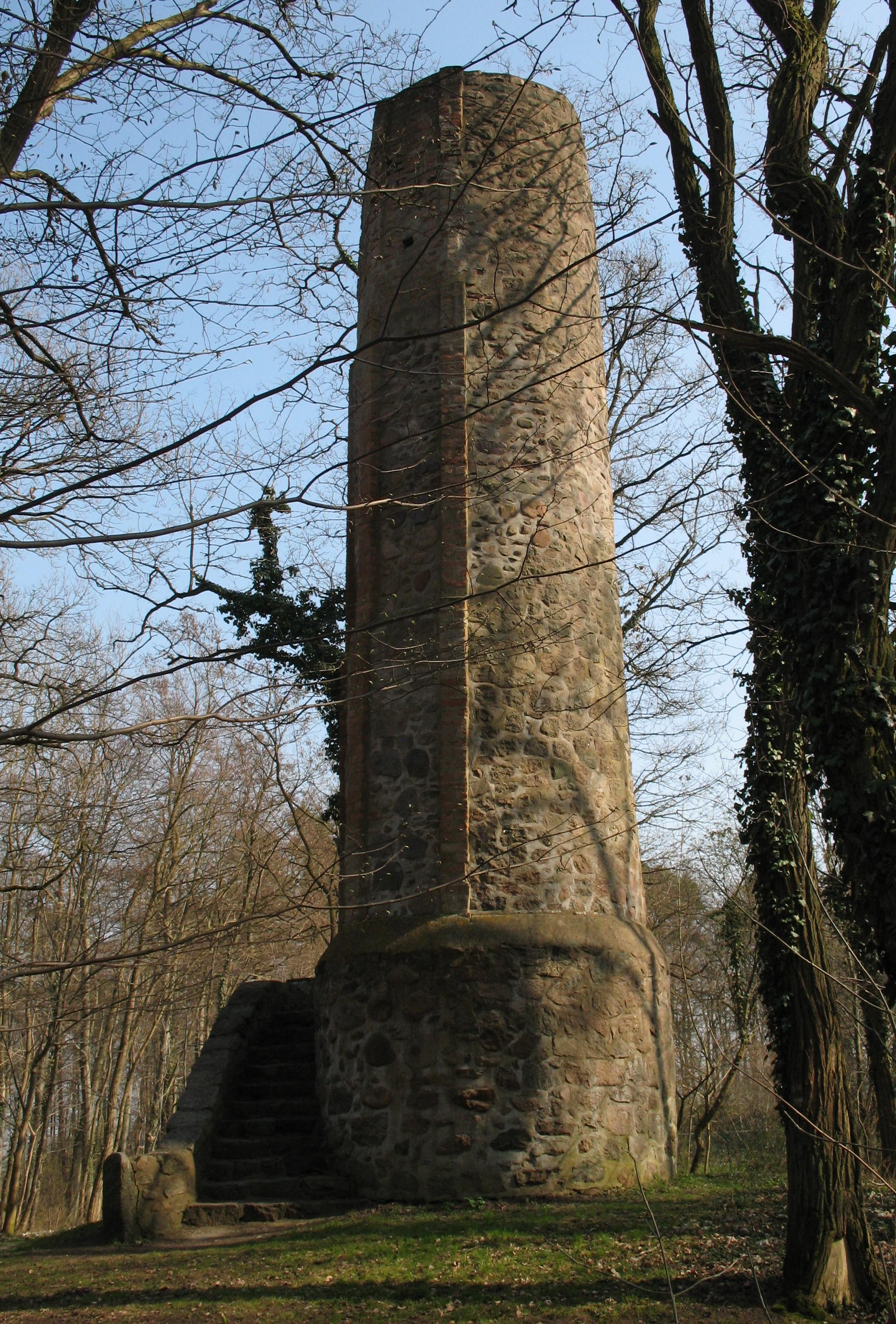
Watch tower

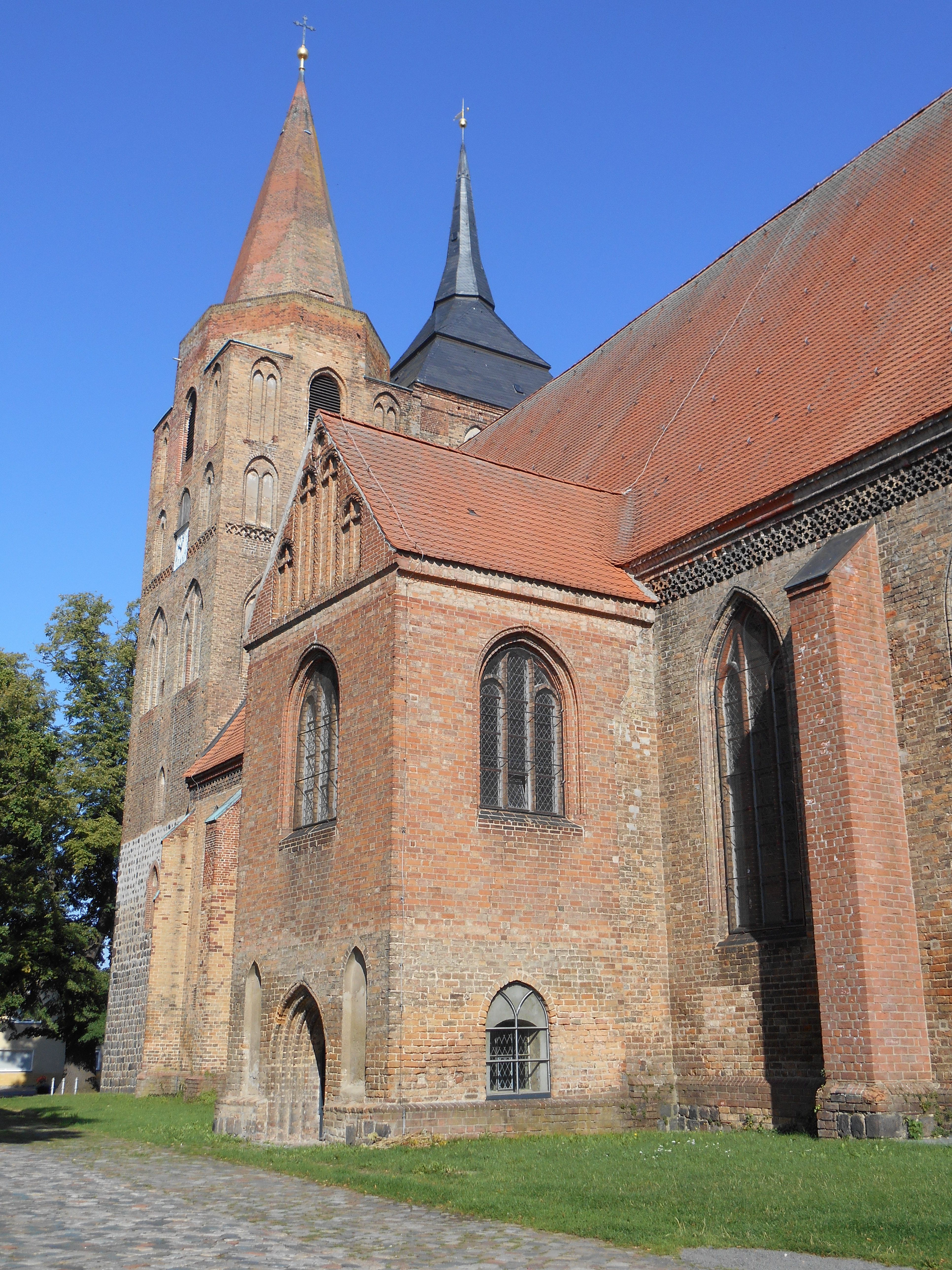
St. Mary's Church in Gransee

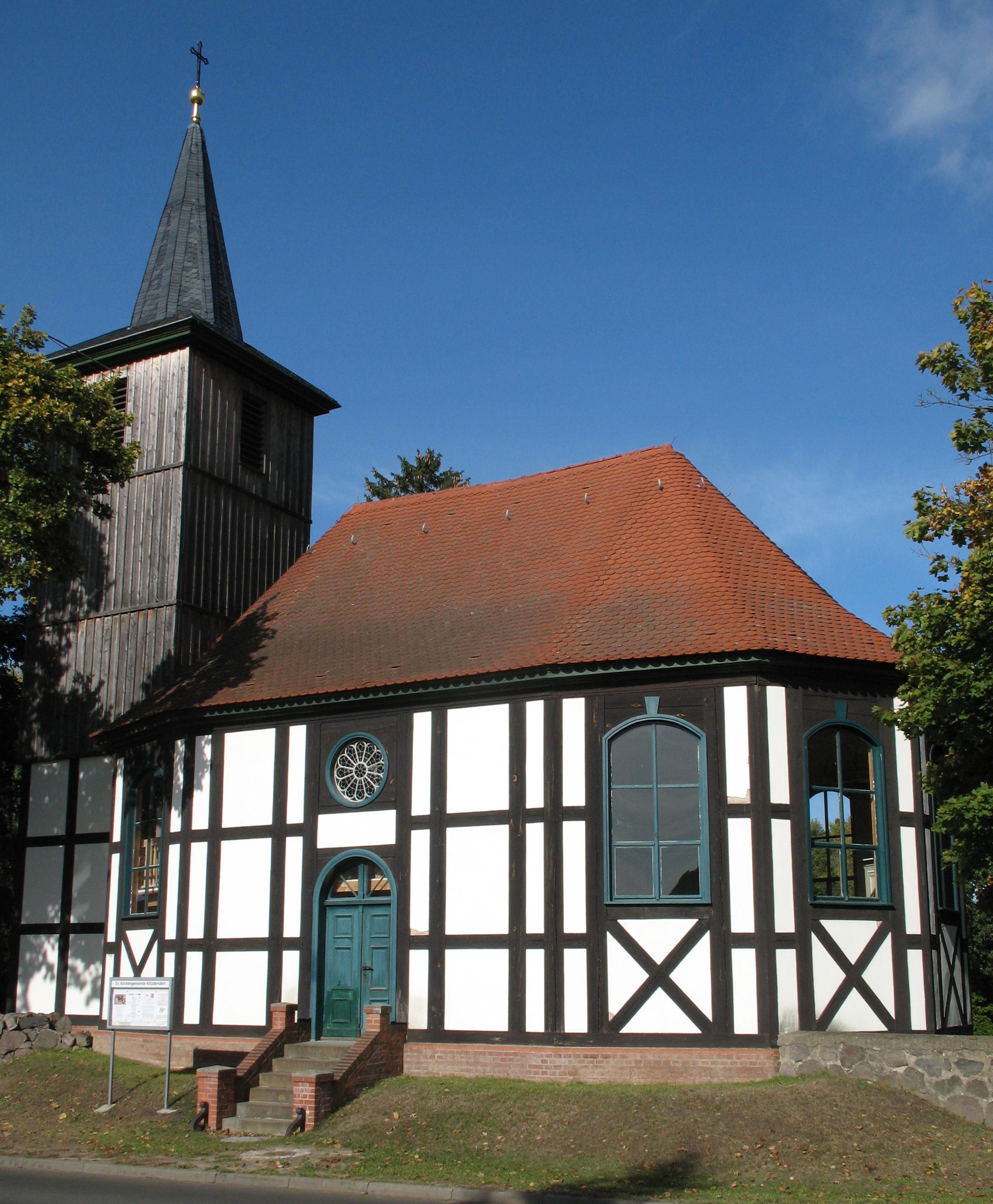
Church in Altlüdersdorf

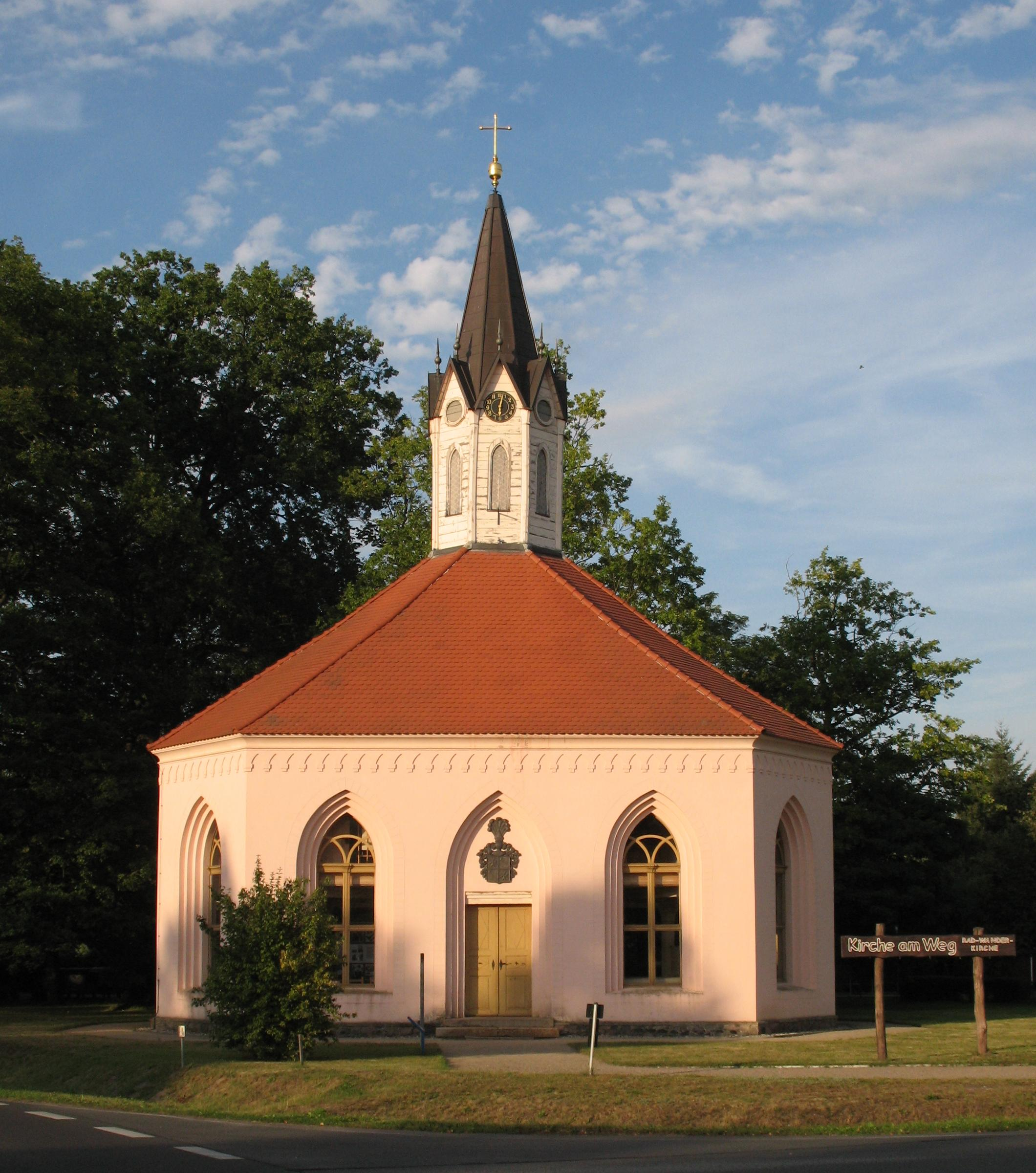
Church in Dannenwalde

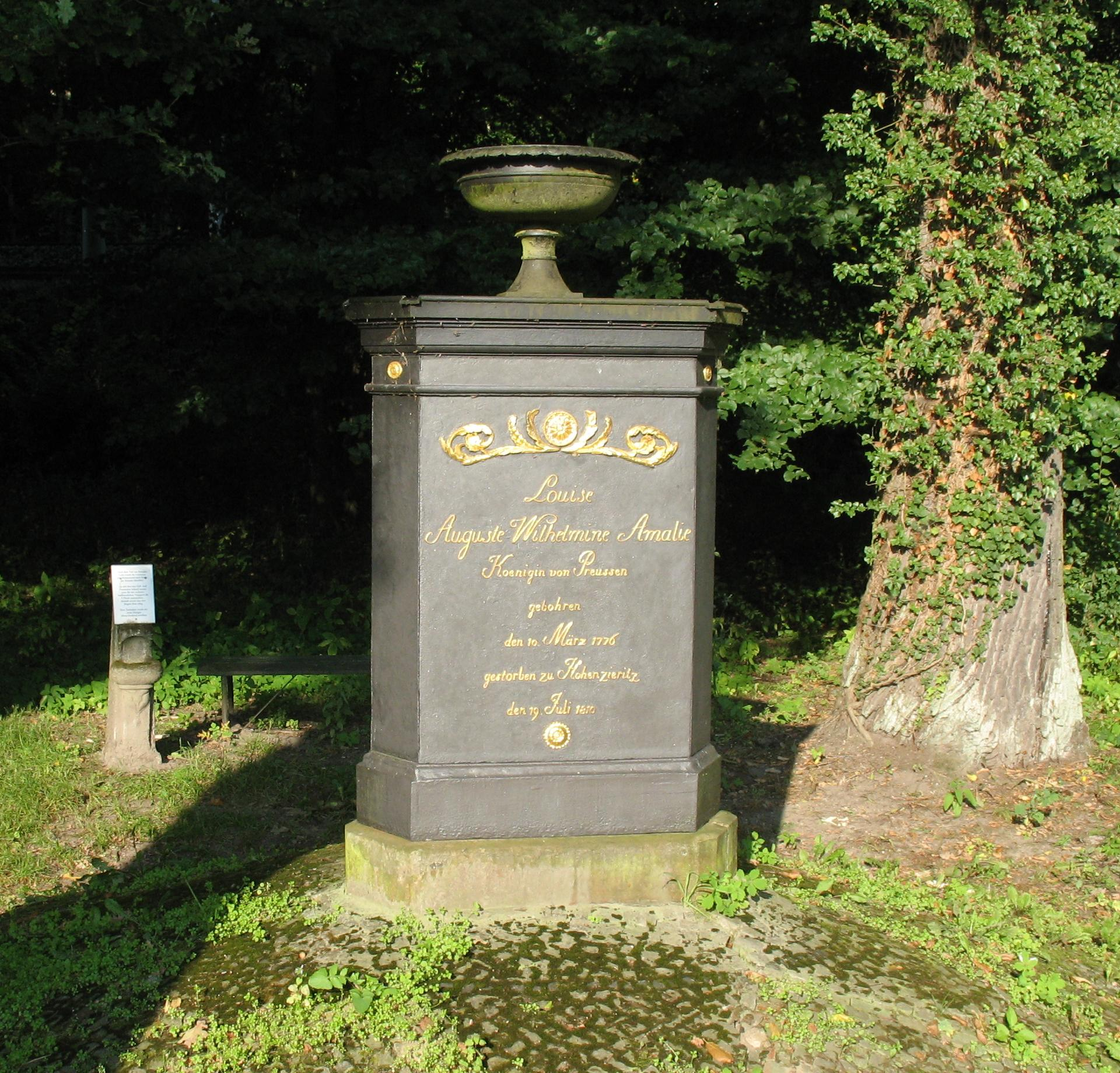
Queen Louise memorial in Seilershof
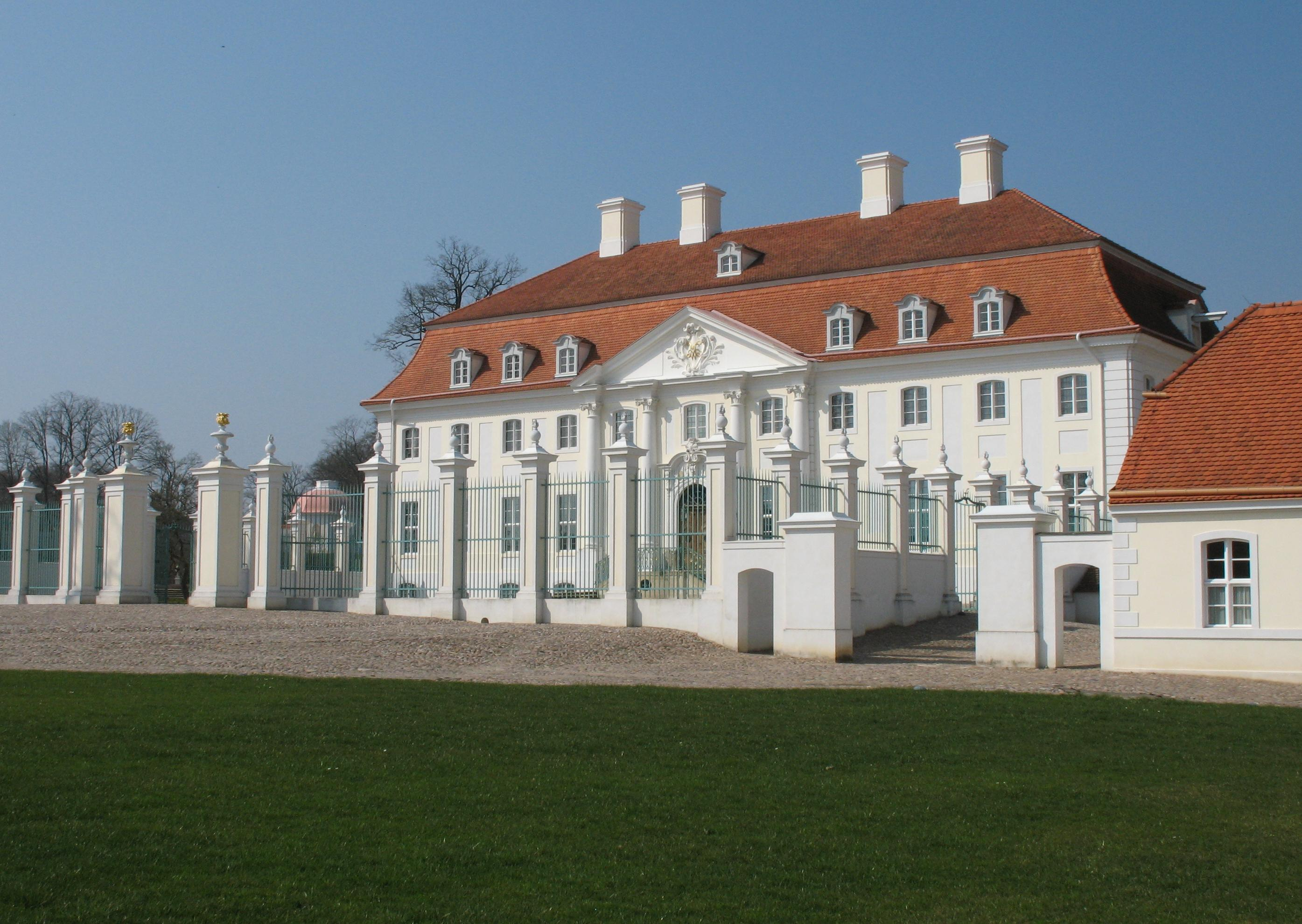
Meseberg palace

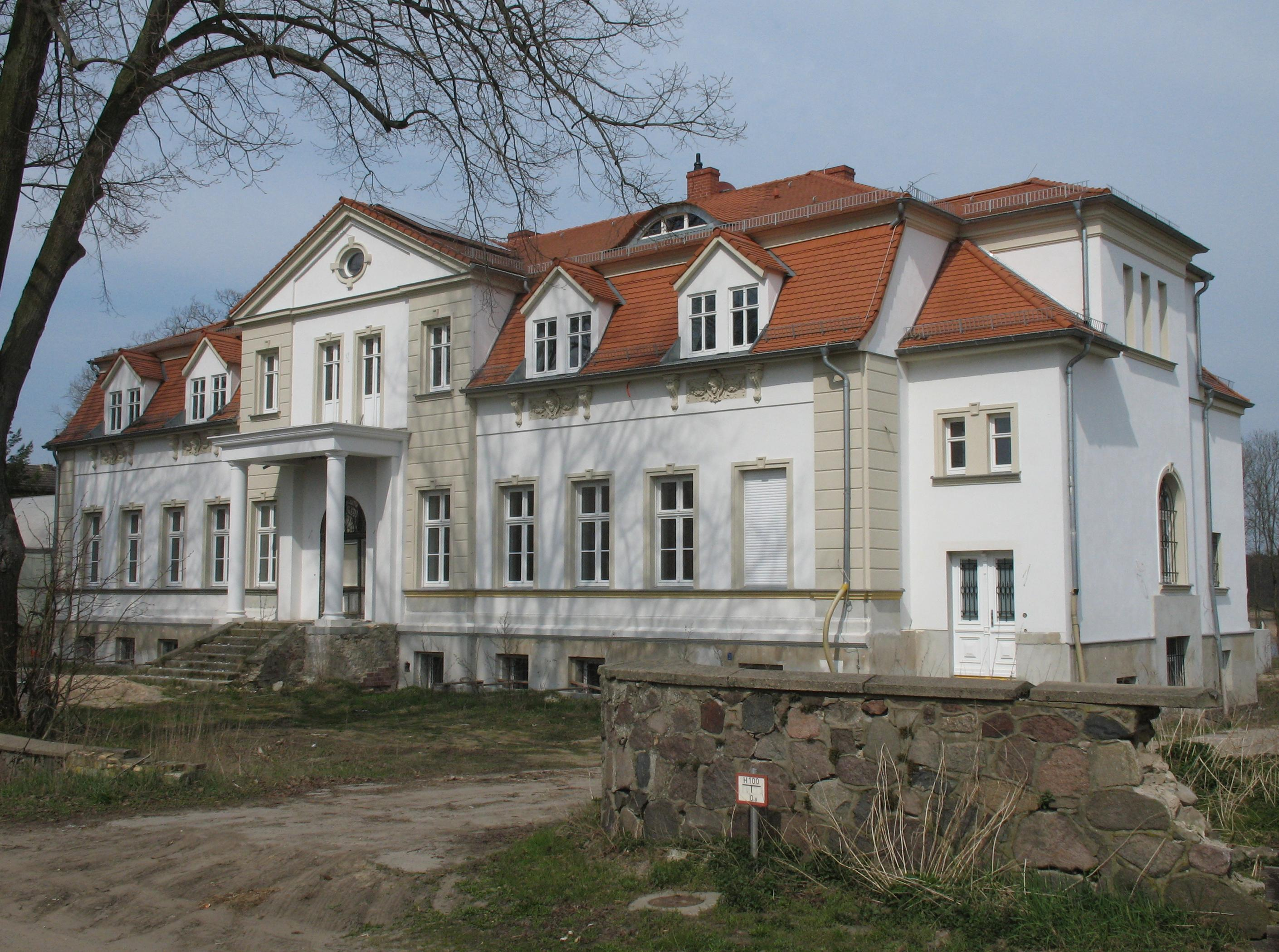
Manor in Wentow

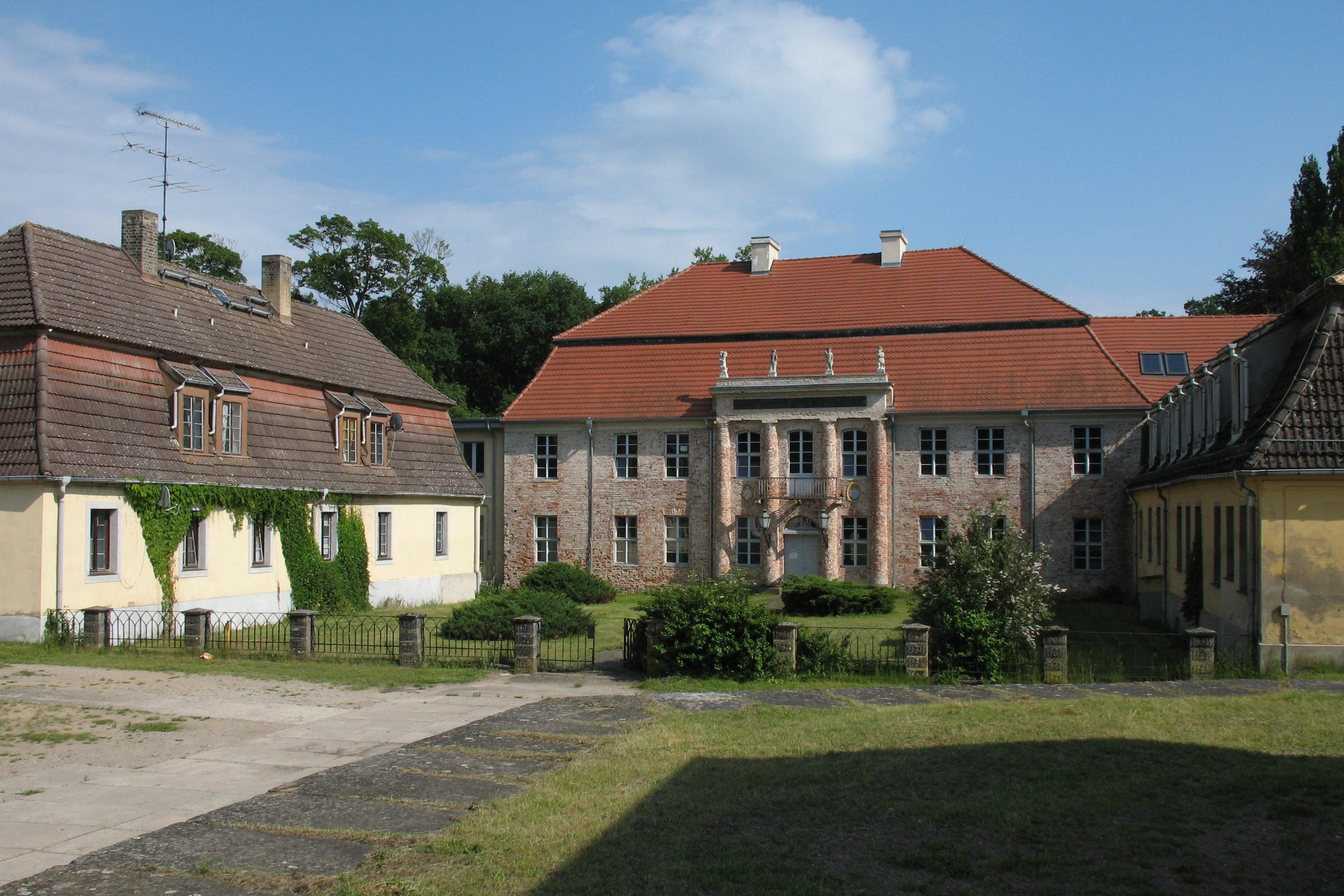
Manor in Dannenwalde

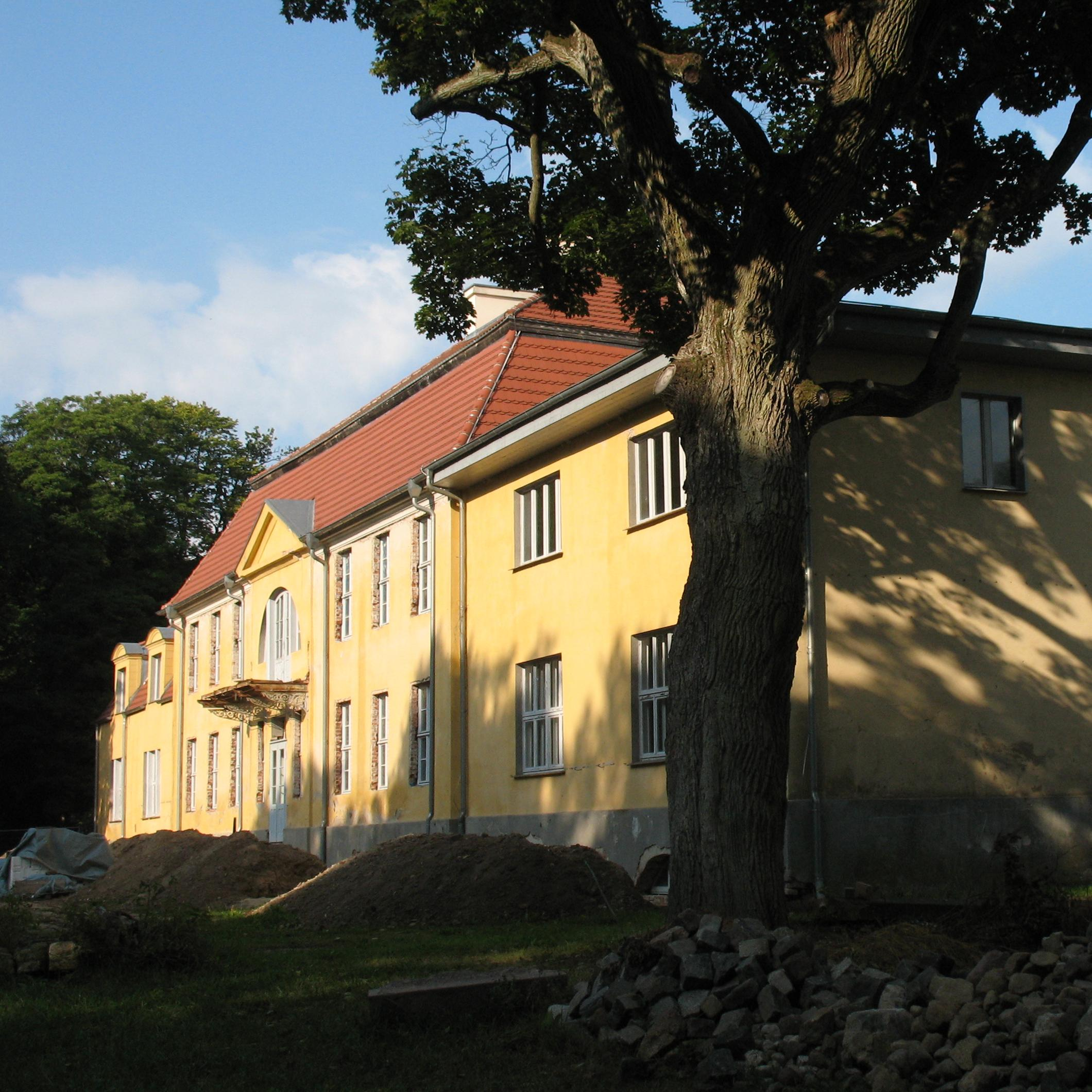
Manor in Dannenwalde

== People ==
- Erdmann Copernicus (died 1573), German scholar, not related to the astronomer
- Emma Trosse (1863-1949), German teacher and poet
- Maria Emelie Snethlage (1868-1929), German-born Brazilian naturalist and ornithologist who worked on the bird fauna of the Amazon
- Heinz Barth (1920-2007), Waffen-SS officer and convicted war criminal responsible for the Oradour-sur-Glane massacre

== See also ==
- Battle of Gransee (1316)
- Gransee und Gemeinden
