= Stechlin =

- Municipality
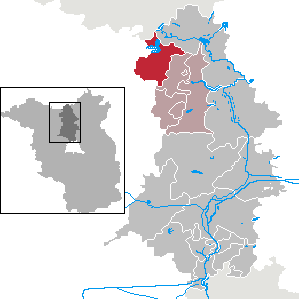
- Location of Stechlin within Oberhavel district
- Interactive map of Stechlin
- Location within Germany Location within Brandenburg
- Coordinates: 53°06′N 13°02′E
- Country: Germany
- State: Brandenburg
- District: Oberhavel
- Municipal assoc.: Gransee und Gemeinden
- Subdivisions: 3 districts

Government
  - Mayor (2024–29): Mario Ledderhose

Area
  - Total: 83.95 km^{2} (32.41 sq mi)
- Elevation: 83 m (272 ft)

Population (2025-12-31)
  - Total: 1,094
  - Density: 13.03/km^{2} (33.75/sq mi)
- Time zone: UTC+01:00 (CET)
  - Summer (DST): UTC+02:00 (CEST)
- Postal codes: 16775
- Dialling codes: 033082
- Vehicle registration: OHV
- Website: www.stechlin.de

Stechlin is a municipality in the Oberhavel district, in Brandenburg, Germany.

== Geography ==
Stechlin is part of the northern border of Brandenburg, at the start of the Mecklenburg Lake District. It is part of the Stechlin-Ruppiner Land Nature Park, surrounded by the Menzer Forest and has many lakes in the area. The most famous is Lake Stechlin (Stechlinsee) which is a protected area.

== Districts of Stechlin ==
- Dagow
- Dollgow
- Güldenhof
- Menz
- Neuglobsow
- Neuroofen
- Schulzenhof

== Demography ==
Development of population since 1875 within the current boundaries (Blue line: Population; Dotted line: Comparison to population development of Brandenburg state; Grey background: Time of Nazi rule; Red background: Time of communist rule)

Stechlin: Population development
within the current boundaries (2020)

| Year | Pop. | ±% p.a. |
|---|---|---|
| 1875 | 1,389 | — |
| 1890 | 1,299 | −0.45% |
| 1910 | 1,163 | −0.55% |
| 1925 | 1,174 | +0.06% |
| 1933 | 1,240 | +0.69% |
| 1939 | 1,266 | +0.35% |
| 1946 | 1,803 | +5.18% |
| 1950 | 1,948 | +1.95% |
| 1964 | 1,561 | −1.57% |
| 1971 | 1,534 | −0.25% |
| 1981 | 1,468 | −0.44% |
| 1985 | 1,468 | +0.00% |
| 1989 | 1,476 | +0.14% |
| 1990 | 1,466 | −0.68% |
| 1991 | 1,461 | −0.34% |

| Year | Pop. | ±% p.a. |
|---|---|---|
| 1992 | 1,461 | +0.00% |
| 1993 | 1,441 | −1.37% |
| 1994 | 1,428 | −0.90% |
| 1995 | 1,402 | −1.82% |
| 1996 | 1,398 | −0.29% |
| 1997 | 1,380 | −1.29% |
| 1998 | 1,370 | −0.72% |
| 1999 | 1,373 | +0.22% |
| 2000 | 1,367 | −0.44% |
| 2001 | 1,355 | −0.88% |
| 2002 | 1,349 | −0.44% |
| 2003 | 1,357 | +0.59% |
| 2004 | 1,327 | −2.21% |
| 2005 | 1,304 | −1.73% |
| 2006 | 1,296 | −0.61% |

| Year | Pop. | ±% p.a. |
|---|---|---|
| 2007 | 1,271 | −1.93% |
| 2008 | 1,276 | +0.39% |
| 2009 | 1,266 | −0.78% |
| 2010 | 1,239 | −2.13% |
| 2011 | 1,213 | −2.10% |
| 2012 | 1,202 | −0.91% |
| 2013 | 1,183 | −1.58% |
| 2014 | 1,203 | +1.69% |
| 2015 | 1,187 | −1.33% |
| 2016 | 1,213 | +2.19% |
| 2017 | 1,214 | +0.08% |
| 2018 | 1,201 | −1.07% |
| 2019 | 1,192 | −0.75% |
| 2020 | 1,185 | −0.59% |

== District Authority ==
Stechlin is in the borough of Gransee. Stechlin has its own council that is responsible for 3 districts:

- Dollgow with Schulzenhof and Güldenhof
- Neuglobsow with Dagow
- Menz with Neuroofen
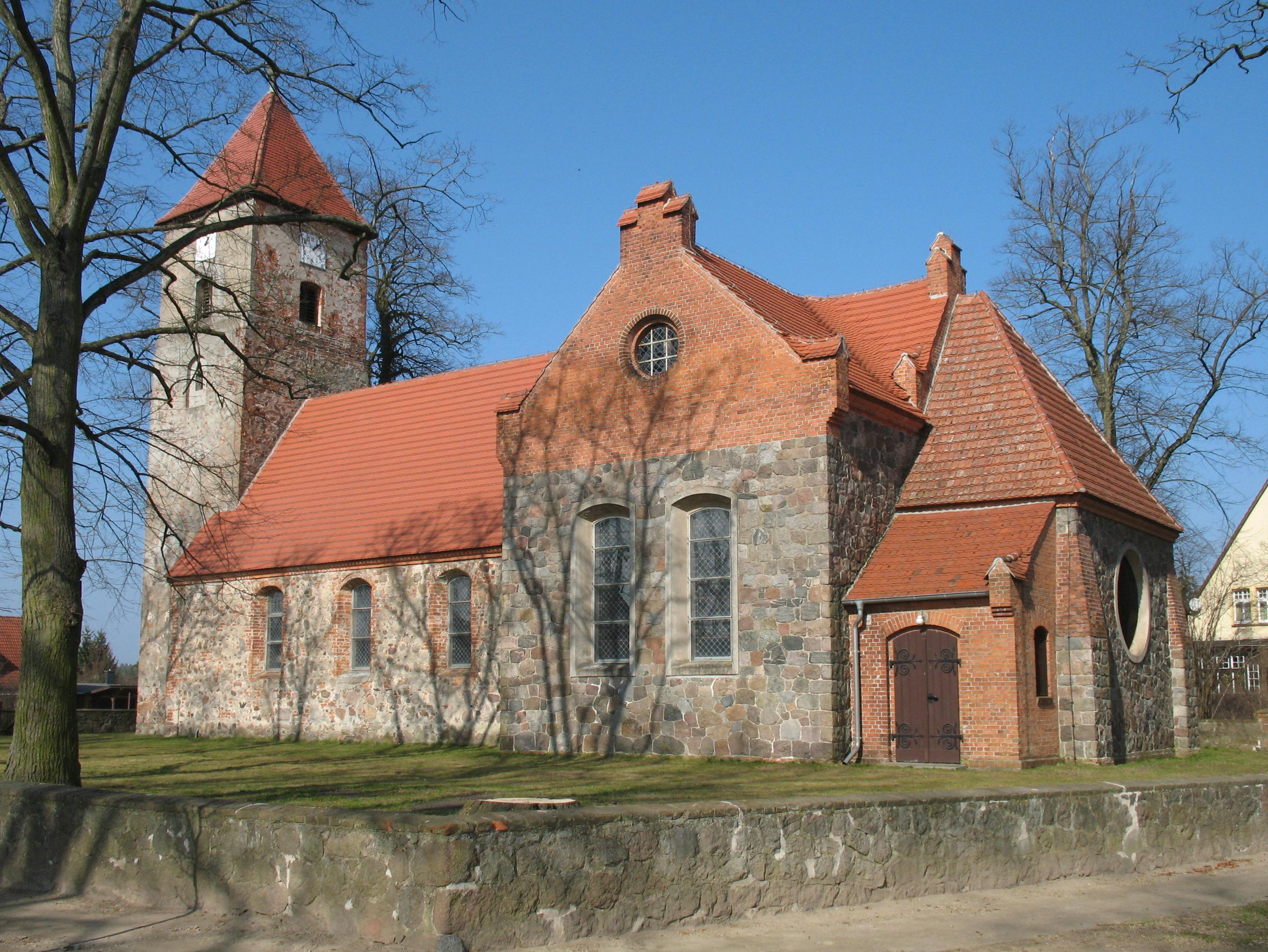
Church in Menz

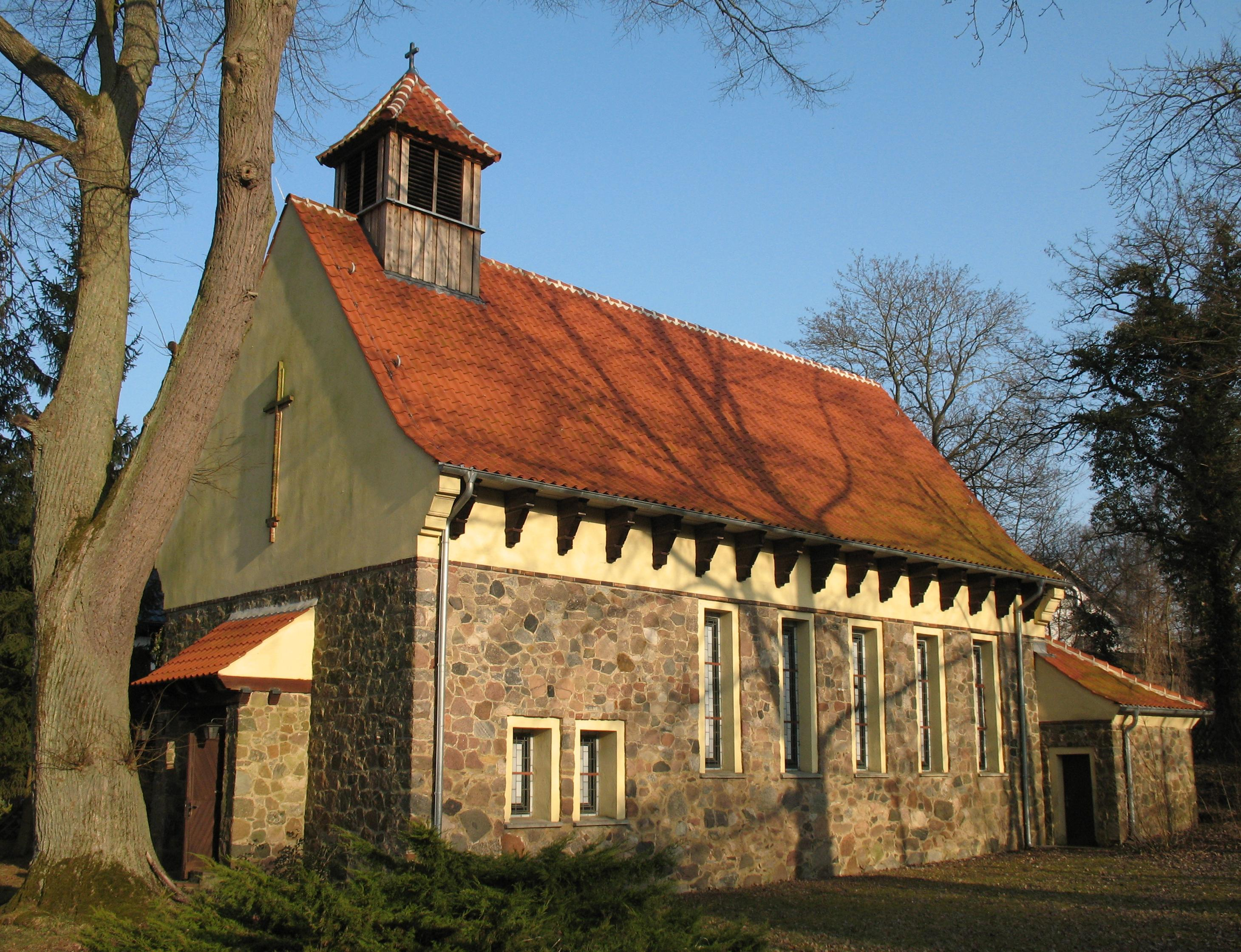
Church in Neuglobsow

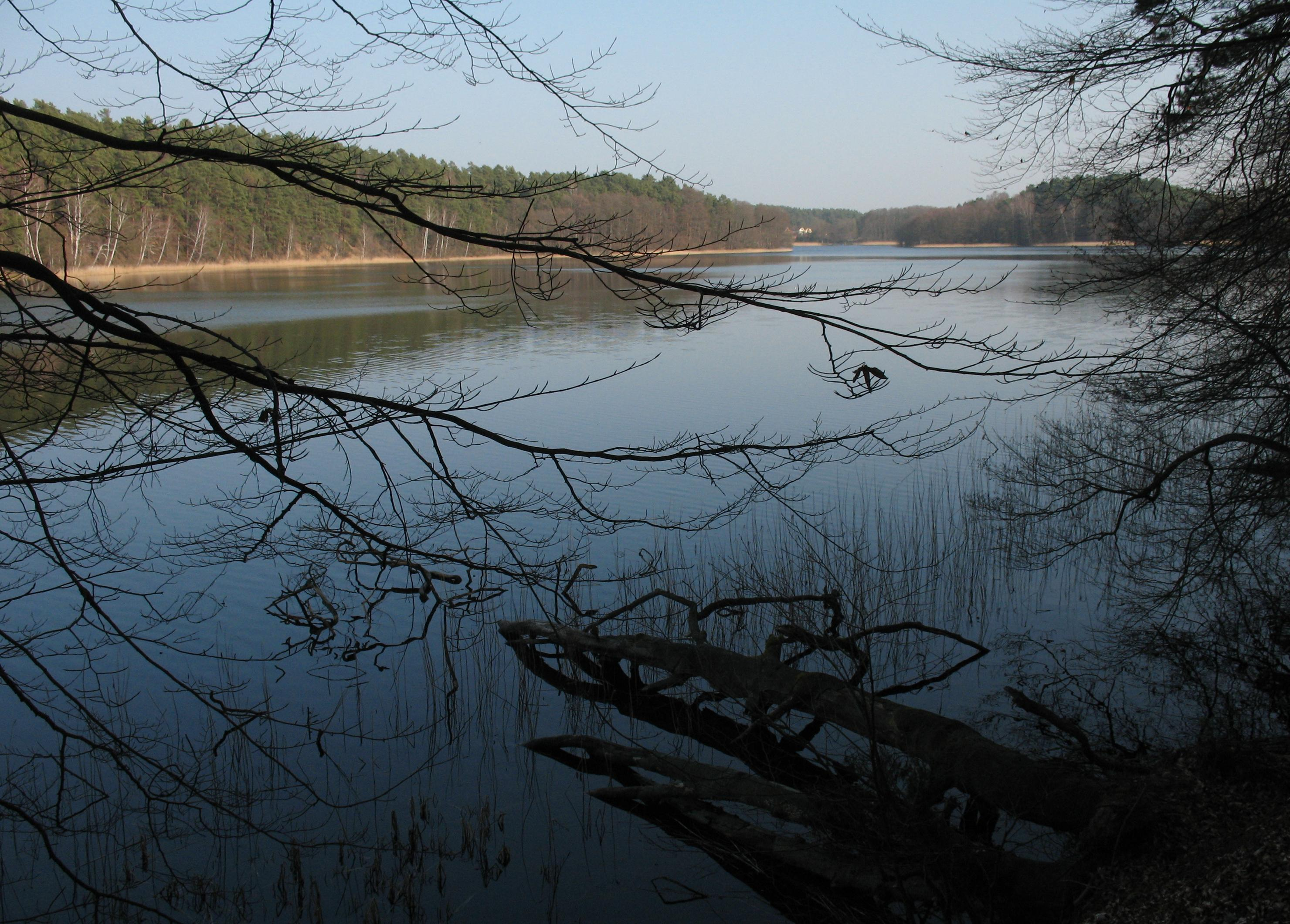
Lake Roofen in Menz

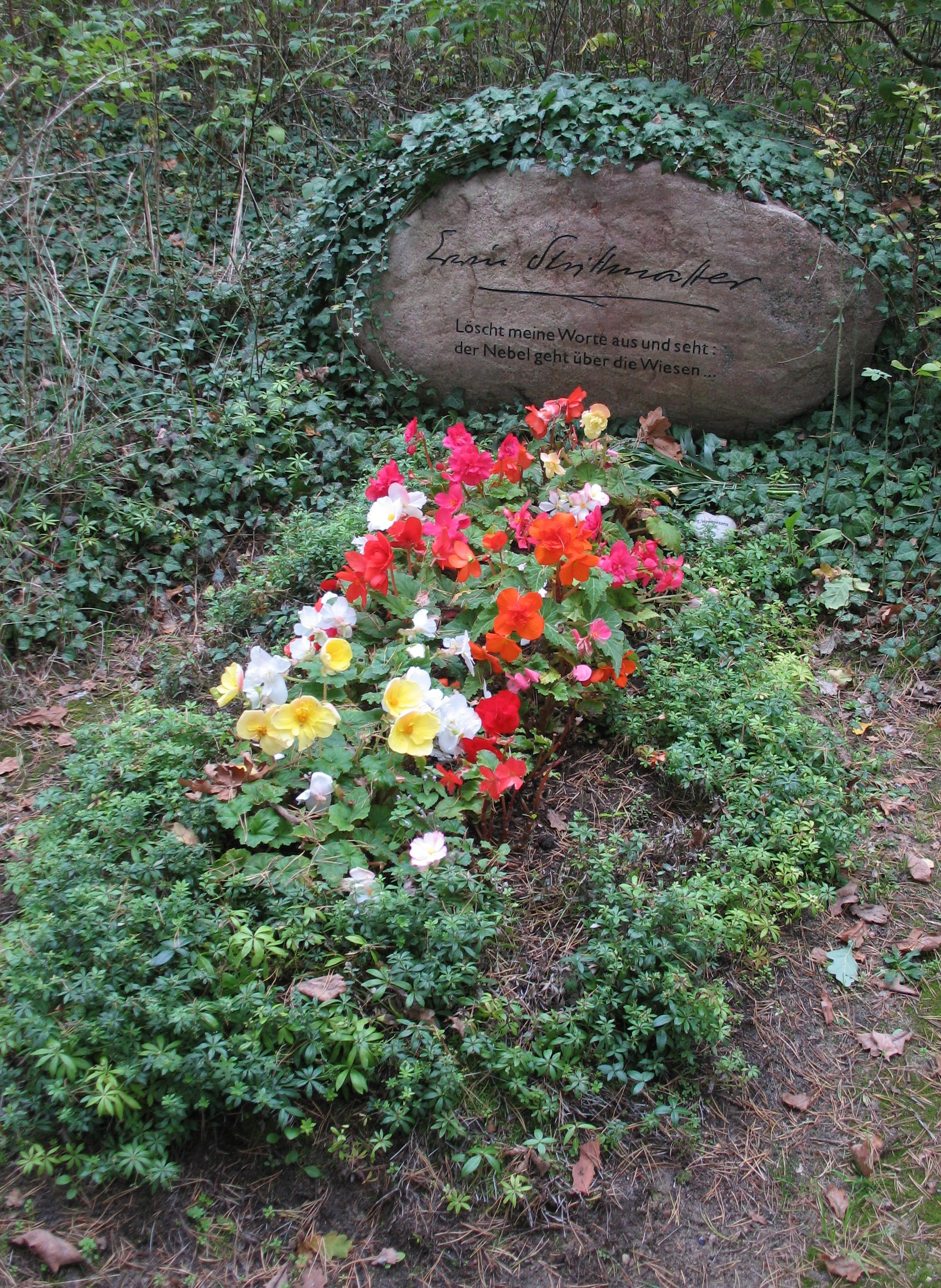
Erwin Strittmatter's grave in Schulzenhof

== See also ==
- Roofensee
