= Gransee und Gemeinden =

- Amt
- Map of Oberhavel highlighting Gransee und Gemeinden
- Interactive map of Gransee und Gemeinden
- Location within Germany Location within Brandenburg
- Coordinates: 53°00′N 13°09′E
- Country: Germany
- State: Brandenburg
- District: Oberhavel
- Seat: Gransee
- Subdivisions: 5 municipalities

Area
  - Total: 321.55 km^{2} (124.15 sq mi)

Population (2025-12-31)
  - Total: 8,858
  - Density: 27.55/km^{2} (71.35/sq mi)
- Time zone: UTC+01:00 (CET)
  - Summer (DST): UTC+02:00 (CEST)
- Website: www.gransee.de

Amt Gransee und Gemeinden is an Amt ("collective municipality") in the district of Oberhavel, in Brandenburg, Germany. Its seat is in Gransee.

The Amt Gransee und Gemeinden consists of the following municipalities:

1. Gransee
2. Großwoltersdorf
3. Schönermark
4. Sonnenberg
5. Stechlin

== Demography ==
Development of Population since 1875 within the Current Boundaries (Blue Line: Population; Dotted Line: Comparison to Population Development of Brandenburg state; Grey Background: Time of Nazi rule; Red Background: Time of Communist rule)

Recent Population Development and Projections (Population Development before Census 2011 (blue line); Recent Population Development according to the Census in Germany in 2011 (blue bordered line); Official projections for 2005-2030 (yellow line); for 2020-2030 (green line); for 2017-2030 (scarlet line)

Amt Gransee und Gemeinden: Population development
within the current boundaries (2013)

Year	Pop.	±% p.a.
1875	9,978	—
1890	10,722	+0.48%
1910	10,434	−0.14%
1925	10,740	+0.19%
1933	10,627	−0.13%
1939	11,197	+0.87%
1946	16,517	+5.71%
1950	15,603	−1.41%
1964	12,934	−1.33%
1971	12,623	−0.35%

Year	Pop.	±% p.a.
1981	11,938	−0.56%
1985	11,858	−0.17%
1990	11,536	−0.55%
1995	10,838	−1.24%
2000	10,695	−0.27%
2005	10,095	−1.15%
2010	9,390	−1.44%
2015	9,063	−0.71%
2020	9,108	+0.10%
2025	8,858	−0.56%
