= Birkenwerder =

- Municipality
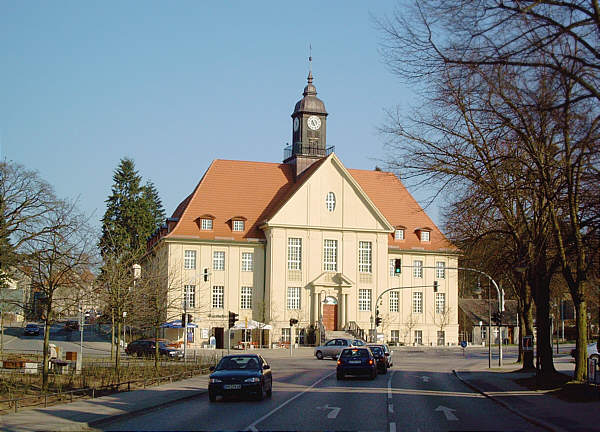
- Town hall

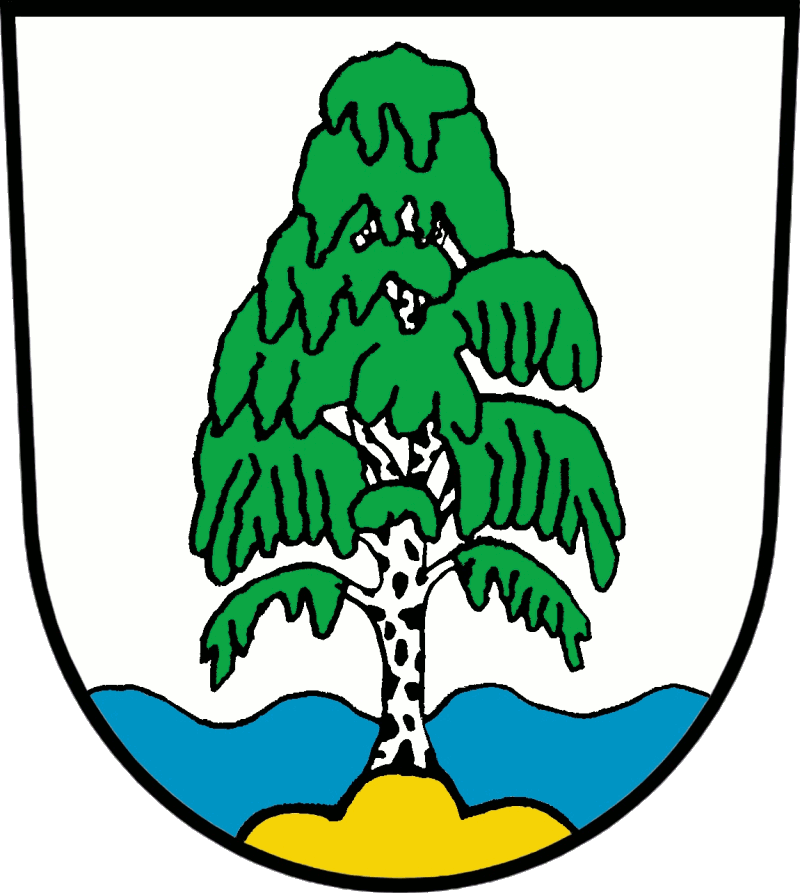
- Coat of arms

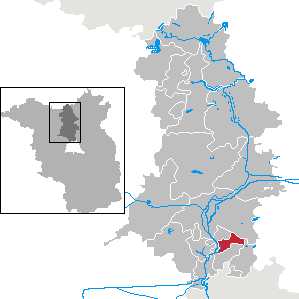
- Location of Birkenwerder within Oberhavel district
- Interactive map of Birkenwerder
- Location within Germany Location within Brandenburg
- Coordinates: 52°41′N 13°17′E
- Country: Germany
- State: Brandenburg
- District: Oberhavel

Government
  - Mayor (2023–31): Stephan Zimniok

Area
  - Total: 18.10 km^{2} (6.99 sq mi)
- Elevation: 32–56 m (105–184 ft)

Population (2025-12-31)
  - Total: 7,958
  - Density: 439.7/km^{2} (1,139/sq mi)
- Time zone: UTC+01:00 (CET)
  - Summer (DST): UTC+02:00 (CEST)
- Postal codes: 16547
- Dialling codes: 03303
- Vehicle registration: OHV
- Website: www.birkenwerder.de

Birkenwerder is a municipality in the Oberhavel district, in Brandenburg, Germany.

== Geography ==
Birkenwerder is situated in the south of Oberhavel. The northern border of Berlin is 3 kilometres away. Birkenwerder shares his border with Oranienburg in the north, Mühlenbecker Land in the east and Hohen Neuendorf in the south and in the north. In the centre of Birkenwerder is the river Briese. In the west of Birkenwerder it empties in the River Havel. Briese and Lindenhof are districts (Wohnplätze) of Birkenwerder. More than 50% of the area consists of forest. There are many forest roads, also along the river Briese. Birkenwerder is connected to the motorway A 10 (Bundesautobahn 10), the B 96 (Bundesstraße 96) and the B 96a which ends in the centre of Birkenwerder.

== Demography ==
Development of population since 1875 within the current boundaries (blue line: population; dotted line: comparison to population development of Brandenburg state)

Recent population development (blue line) and forecasts

Birkenwerder: Population development
within the current boundaries (2025)

Year	Pop.	±% p.a.
1875	951	—
1890	1,167	+1.37%
1910	2,318	+3.49%
1925	3,387	+2.56%
1939	6,648	+4.93%
1950	7,148	+0.66%
1964	6,967	−0.18%
1971	6,911	−0.12%

Year	Pop.	±% p.a.
1981	6,325	−0.88%
1985	6,122	−0.81%
1990	5,510	−2.08%
1995	5,417	−0.34%
2000	6,518	+3.77%
2005	7,219	+2.06%
2010	7,819	+1.61%
2015	8,019	+0.51%

Year	Pop.	±% p.a.
2020	8,132	+0.28%
2021	8,116	−0.20%
2022	7,922	−2.39%
2023	7,923	+0.01%
2024	7,935	+0.15%
2025	7,958	+0.29%
