= Sonnenberg =

- Municipality
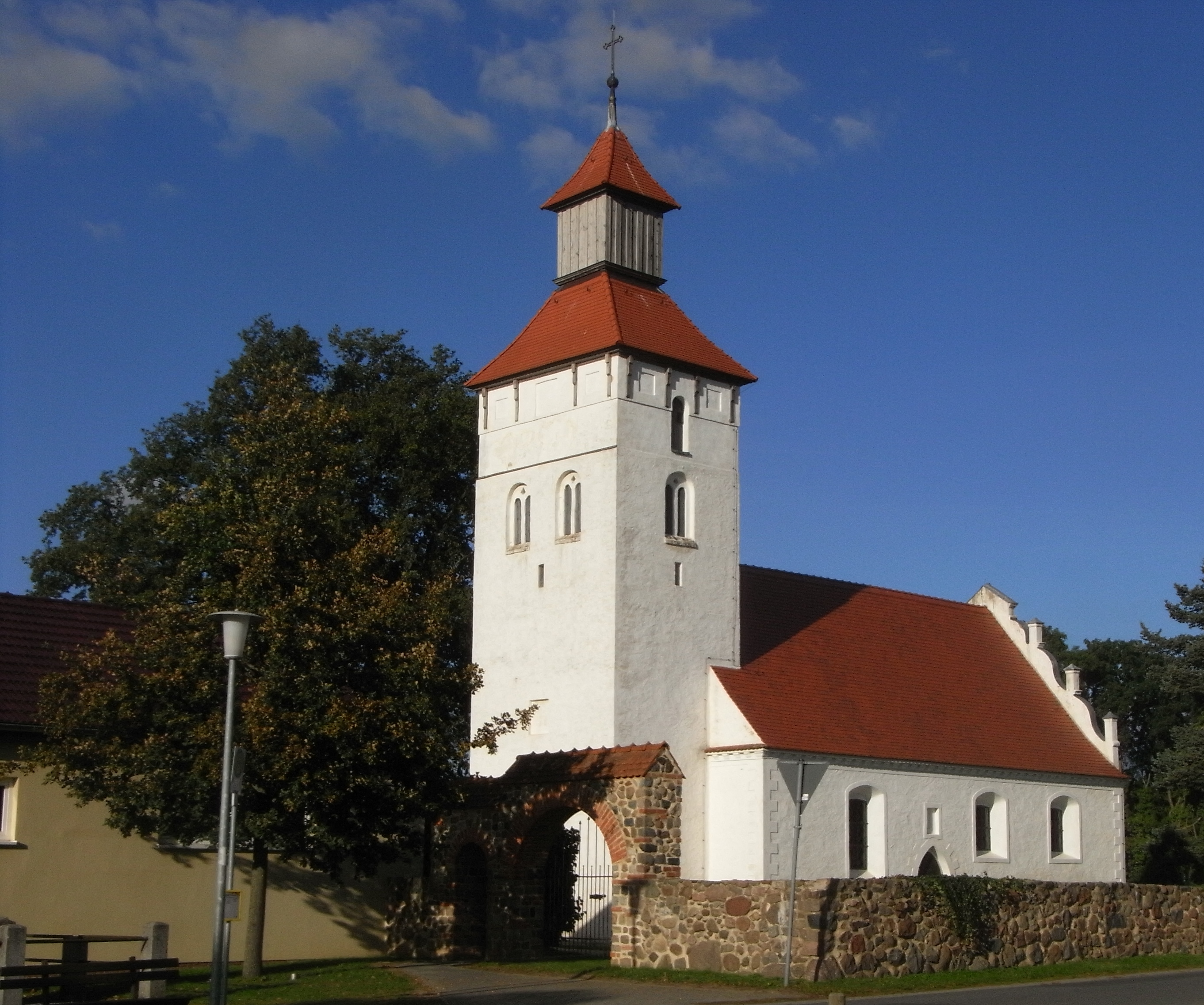
- Church of Sonnenberg

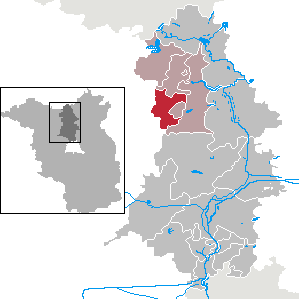
- Location of Sonnenberg within Oberhavel district
- Interactive map of Sonnenberg
- Location within Germany Location within Brandenburg
- Coordinates: 53°01′08″N 13°05′19″E
- Country: Germany
- State: Brandenburg
- District: Oberhavel
- Municipal assoc.: Gransee und Gemeinden
- Subdivisions: 5 districts

Government
  - Mayor (2024–29): Ralf Wöller

Area
  - Total: 50.57 km^{2} (19.53 sq mi)
- Elevation: 64 m (210 ft)

Population (2025-12-31)
  - Total: 818
  - Density: 16.2/km^{2} (41.9/sq mi)
- Time zone: UTC+01:00 (CET)
  - Summer (DST): UTC+02:00 (CEST)
- Postal codes: 16775
- Dialling codes: 033082
- Vehicle registration: OHV
- Website: Gemeinde Sonnenberg

Sonnenberg (German pronunciation: [ˈzɔnənbɛʁk]) is a municipality in the Oberhavel district, in Brandenburg, Germany.

== Demography ==
Development of population since 1875 within the current boundaries (Blue line: Population; Dotted line: Comparison to population development of Brandenburg state; Grey background: Time of Nazi rule; Red background: Time of communist rule)

Sonnenberg: Population development
within the current boundaries (2020)

| Year | Pop. | ±% p.a. |
|---|---|---|
| 1875 | 1,571 | — |
| 1890 | 1,510 | −0.26% |
| 1910 | 1,306 | −0.72% |
| 1925 | 1,381 | +0.37% |
| 1933 | 1,327 | −0.50% |
| 1939 | 1,237 | −1.16% |
| 1946 | 2,310 | +9.33% |
| 1950 | 2,035 | −3.12% |
| 1964 | 1,532 | −2.01% |
| 1971 | 1,508 | −0.23% |
| 1981 | 1,243 | −1.91% |
| 1985 | 1,189 | −1.10% |
| 1989 | 1,066 | −2.69% |
| 1990 | 1,053 | −1.22% |
| 1991 | 1,044 | −0.85% |

| Year | Pop. | ±% p.a. |
|---|---|---|
| 1992 | 1,034 | −0.96% |
| 1993 | 1,024 | −0.97% |
| 1994 | 1,017 | −0.68% |
| 1995 | 989 | −2.75% |
| 1996 | 1,004 | +1.52% |
| 1997 | 977 | −2.69% |
| 1998 | 960 | −1.74% |
| 1999 | 973 | +1.35% |
| 2000 | 974 | +0.10% |
| 2001 | 960 | −1.44% |
| 2002 | 953 | −0.73% |
| 2003 | 938 | −1.57% |
| 2004 | 934 | −0.43% |
| 2005 | 921 | −1.39% |
| 2006 | 904 | −1.85% |

| Year | Pop. | ±% p.a. |
|---|---|---|
| 2007 | 911 | +0.77% |
| 2008 | 890 | −2.31% |
| 2009 | 891 | +0.11% |
| 2010 | 888 | −0.34% |
| 2011 | 855 | −3.72% |
| 2012 | 855 | +0.00% |
| 2013 | 841 | −1.64% |
| 2014 | 828 | −1.55% |
| 2015 | 823 | −0.60% |
| 2016 | 814 | −1.09% |
| 2017 | 825 | +1.35% |
| 2018 | 835 | +1.21% |
| 2019 | 831 | −0.48% |
| 2020 | 845 | +1.68% |
