= Großwoltersdorf =

- Municipality
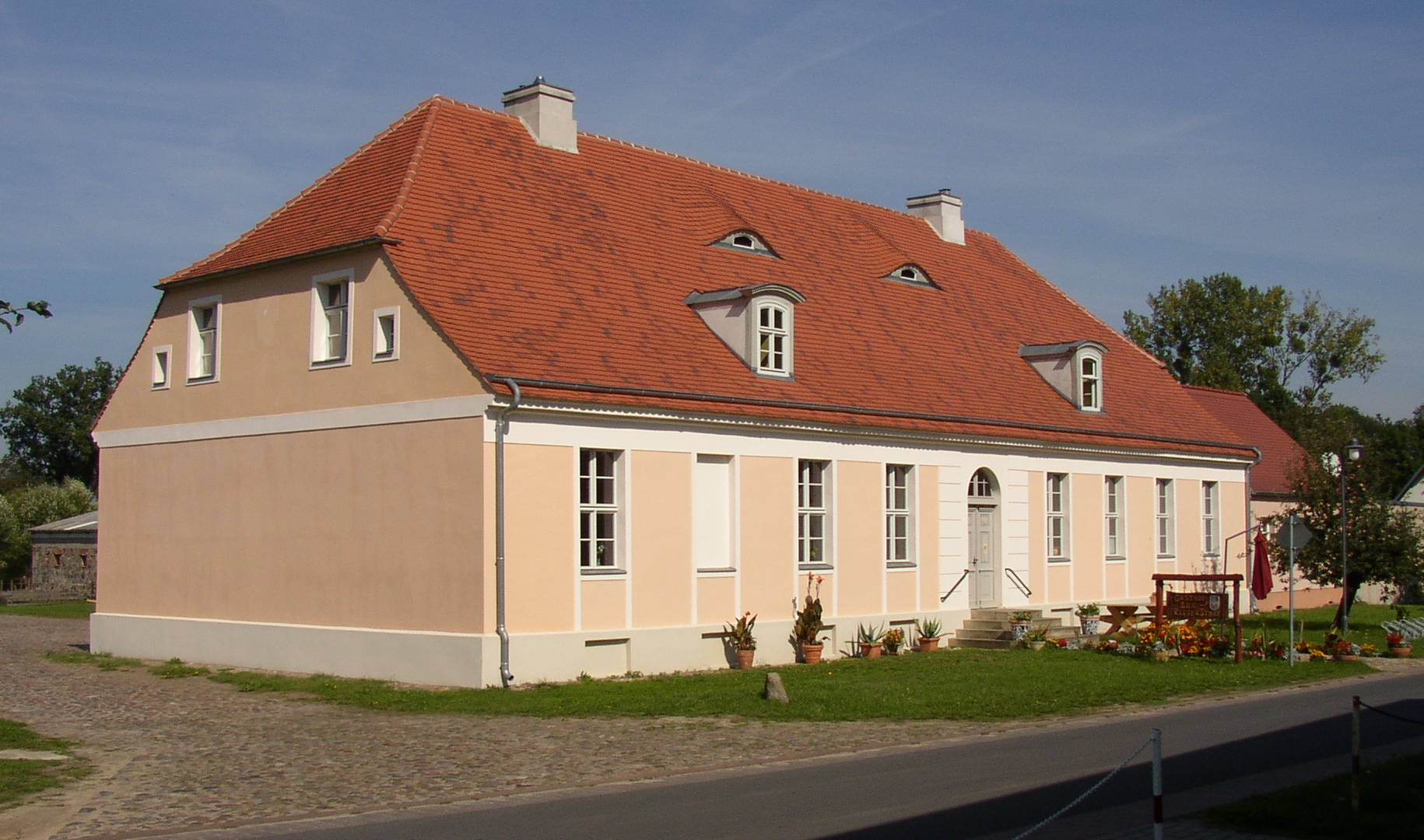
- Inspector's house in Zernikow

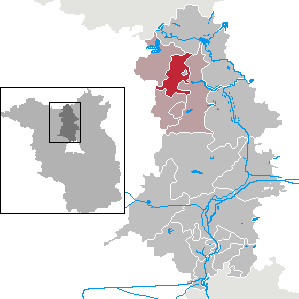
- Location of Großwoltersdorf within Oberhavel district
- Interactive map of Großwoltersdorf
- Location within Germany Location within Brandenburg
- Coordinates: 53°04′00″N 13°05′59″E
- Country: Germany
- State: Brandenburg
- District: Oberhavel
- Municipal assoc.: Gransee und Gemeinden
- Subdivisions: 3 districts

Government
  - Mayor (2024–29): Ingo Utesch

Area
  - Total: 52.27 km^{2} (20.18 sq mi)
- Elevation: 68 m (223 ft)

Population (2025-12-31)
  - Total: 709
  - Density: 13.6/km^{2} (35.1/sq mi)
- Time zone: UTC+01:00 (CET)
  - Summer (DST): UTC+02:00 (CEST)
- Postal codes: 16775
- Dialling codes: 033082
- Vehicle registration: OHV
- Website: Gemeinde Großwoltersdorf

Großwoltersdorf is a municipality in the Oberhavel district, in Brandenburg, Germany.

== Demography ==
Development of population since 1875 within the current boundaries (Blue line: Population; Dotted line: Comparison to population development of Brandenburg state; Grey background: Time of Nazi rule; Red background: Time of communist rule)

Großwoltersdorf: Population development
within the current boundaries (2020)

Year	Pop.	±% p.a.
1875	1,116	—
1890	1,420	+1.62%
1910	1,405	−0.05%
1925	1,484	+0.37%
1933	1,256	−2.06%
1939	1,387	+1.67%
1946	2,139	+6.38%
1950	1,865	−3.37%
1964	1,414	−1.96%
1971	1,288	−1.32%
1981	1,051	−2.01%
1985	1,023	−0.67%
1989	1,022	−0.02%
1990	1,035	+1.27%
1991	1,007	−2.71%

Year	Pop.	±% p.a.
1992	996	−1.09%
1993	1,001	+0.50%
1994	989	−1.20%
1995	990	+0.10%
1996	986	−0.40%
1997	975	−1.12%
1998	1,001	+2.67%
1999	994	−0.70%
2000	992	−0.20%
2001	1,000	+0.81%
2002	977	−2.30%
2003	990	+1.33%
2004	982	−0.81%
2005	966	−1.63%
2006	932	−3.52%

Year	Pop.	±% p.a.
2007	937	+0.54%
2008	916	−2.24%
2009	908	−0.87%
2010	860	−5.29%
2011	811	−5.70%
2012	810	−0.12%
2013	807	−0.37%
2014	803	−0.50%
2015	793	−1.25%
2016	768	−3.15%
2017	762	−0.78%
2018	759	−0.39%
2019	754	−0.66%
2020	778	+3.18%
