= Oberhavel =

Coordinates: 52°53′N 13°15′E

- District
- Flag Coat of arms
- Country: Germany
- State: Brandenburg
- Capital: Oranienburg

Government
  - District admin.: Alexander Tönnies (SPD)

Area
  - Total: 1,795.3 km^{2} (693.2 sq mi)

Population (31 December 2025)
  - Total: 217,858
  - Density: 121.35/km^{2} (314.29/sq mi)
- Time zone: UTC+01:00 (CET)
  - Summer (DST): UTC+02:00 (CEST)
- Vehicle registration: OHV
- Website: www.oberhavel.de

Oberhavel is a Kreis (district) in the northern part of Brandenburg, Germany. Its neighbouring districts are (clockwise from the north): Mecklenburgische Seenplatte (district) in Mecklenburg-Western Pomerania, the districts of Uckermark and Barnim, the Bundesland of Berlin, and the districts of Havelland and Ostprignitz-Ruppin.

== Geography ==
The district is located on the upper course of the Havel river from its source to the outskirts of Berlin. The north is characterised by many lakes including the Großer Stechlinsee, which is well known thanks to a novel by Theodor Fontane called Der Stechlin.

== History ==
The district was created on 6 December 1993 through the merging of the old Gransee and Oranienburg districts.

== Coat of arms ==
The coat of arms shows the eagle as the symbol of Brandenburg in the upper part. In the lower half are two flying swans on green background representing nature with many lakes. The coat of arms was unofficially used by the precursor district of Oranienburg before the merger, though not then officially granted. It was granted to the district of Oberhavel on 18 May 1994.

== Towns and municipalities ==
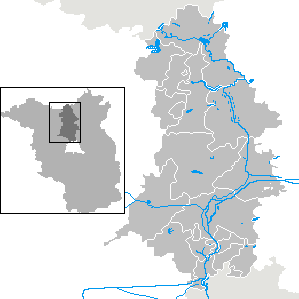
Clickable map of towns and municipalities in the district

Amt-free towns
1. Fürstenberg/Havel
2. Hennigsdorf
3. Hohen Neuendorf
4. Kremmen
5. Liebenwalde
6. Oranienburg
7. Velten
8. Zehdenick
Amt-free municipalities
1. Birkenwerder
2. Glienicke/Nordbahn
3. Leegebruch
4. Löwenberger Land
5. Mühlenbecker Land
6. Oberkrämer
Ämter

Gransee und Gemeinden

1. Gransee^{1, 2}
2. Großwoltersdorf
3. Schönermark
4. Sonnenberg
5. Stechlin

^{1}seat of the Amt; ^{2}town

== Demography ==
Development of population since 1875 within the current boundaries (blue line: population; dotted line: comparison to population development of Brandenburg state; grey background: time of Nazi rule; red background: time of communist rule)

Recent population development and projections (population development before 2011 census (blue line); recent population development according to the Census in Germany in 2011 (blue bordered line); official projections for 2005-2030 (yellow line); for 2020-2030 (green line); for 2017-2030 (scarlet line)

Landkreis Oberhavel: Population development
within the current boundaries (2025)

Year	Pop.	±% p.a.
1875	64,084	—
1890	75,767	+1.12%
1910	99,395	+1.37%
1925	119,031	+1.21%
1933	138,026	+1.87%
1939	178,595	+4.39%
1946	187,548	+0.70%
1950	192,989	+0.72%
1964	179,515	−0.52%
1971	180,152	+0.05%

Year	Pop.	±% p.a.
1981	175,027	−0.29%
1985	174,522	−0.07%
1990	169,086	−0.63%
1995	170,505	+0.17%
2000	192,123	+2.42%
2005	200,184	+0.83%
2010	203,124	+0.29%
2015	207,524	+0.43%
2020	214,234	+0.64%
2025	217,858	+0.34%

== Sport ==
The district is home to three rugby union clubs, the RU Hohen Neuendorf, Veltener RC and Stahl Hennigsdorf Rugby. The latter was the most successful rugby club in East Germany, winning 27 national championships from 1952 to 1990.
