= Bundesstraße 96a =

Federal highway in Germany

B 96a
- Bundesstraße 96a

Route information
- Length: 56 km (35 mi)

Major junctions
- South end: Blankenfelde-Mahlow
- North end: Birkenwerder

Location
- Country: Germany
- States: Brandenburg, Berlin

Highway system
- Roads in Germany; Autobahns; List; Federal; List; State; E-roads

The Bundesstraße 96a (B96a) is a federal highway in Germany. It begins in Mahlow south of Berlin on the B96 and ends north of Berlin in Birkenwerder, again on the B96. In the GDR it replaced the route of today's B96 running through West Berlin. In the GDR it was called F 96 and after German reunification was renamed B96a.

The B96 leads from the south near Mahlow to the north towards the city center of Berlin on former West Berlin territory. For this reason, a new route was designated in the GDR, which starts at Mahlow and turns east towards Schönefeld, from there it crosses the Adlergestell in the former East Berlin district of Treptow and crosses the Spree on the Elsenbrücke bridge. In the former district of Friedrichshain, the route runs along Stralauer Allee, Warschauer Straße and today's Petersburger Straße, in the former district of Prenzlauer Berg along today's Danziger Straße and then northwards along Schönhauser Allee. Through the district of Pankow it leads to Birkenwerder, where it meets the route of the B96 again.

Until the construction of the bridge over the Berlin outer ring two kilometers west of Waßmannsdorf in the 1980s, today's B96a did not begin in Mahlow, but in the Glasow district, led via Selchow to Waßmannsdorf and from there—since the early 1990s in four lanes—to the airport in Schönefeld.

With the planned expansion of Berlin-Schönefeld Airport into an international air hub (BER), old plans were taken up again and revised. In 2002 the four-lane link from the northern bypass of Mahlow to the bridge with the Berlin outer ring was expanded. Since 2007, the expressway from there via Waßmannsdorf to Schönefeld has been passable with four lanes throughout.

The Berlin-Schönefeld Airport had already been connected to East Berlin in four lanes. From the Treptow junction on the A 117 motorway, the route continues as a motor road without intersections and ends at the broad Adlergestell, which leads into the city of Berlin.

== See also ==
- Bundesstraße
- List of federal highways in Germany
