= Adlergestell =

Longest road in Berlin, Germany

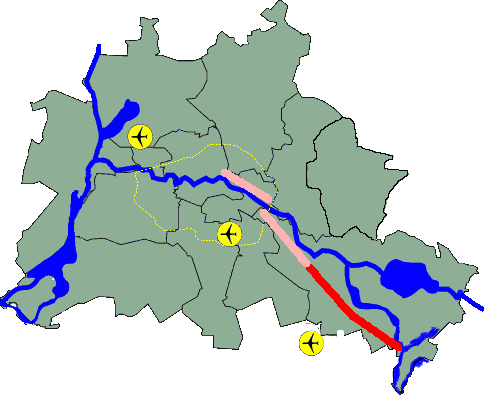
Location of the Adlergestell in Berlin

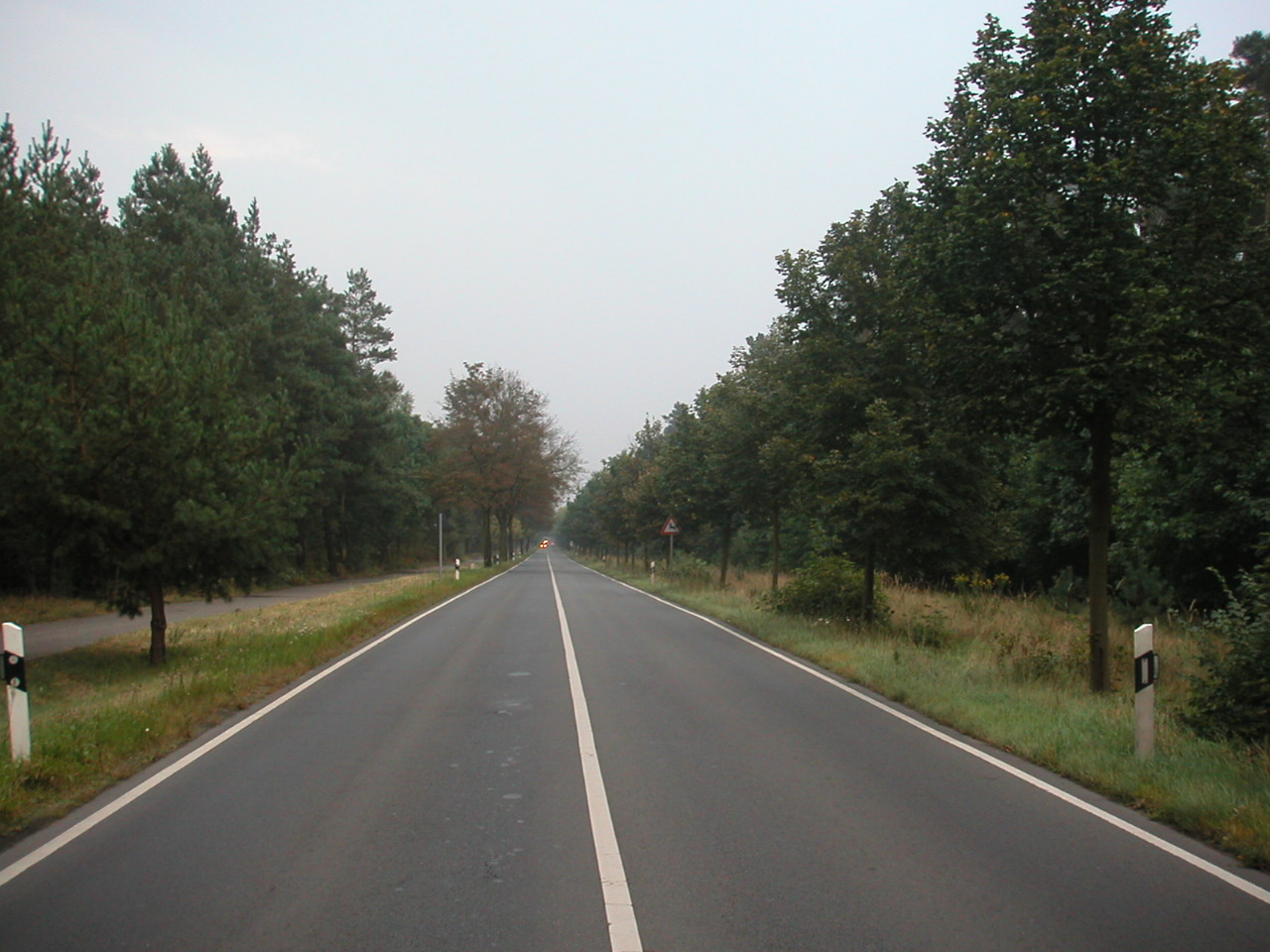
Adlergestell in Schmöckwitz, towards city center

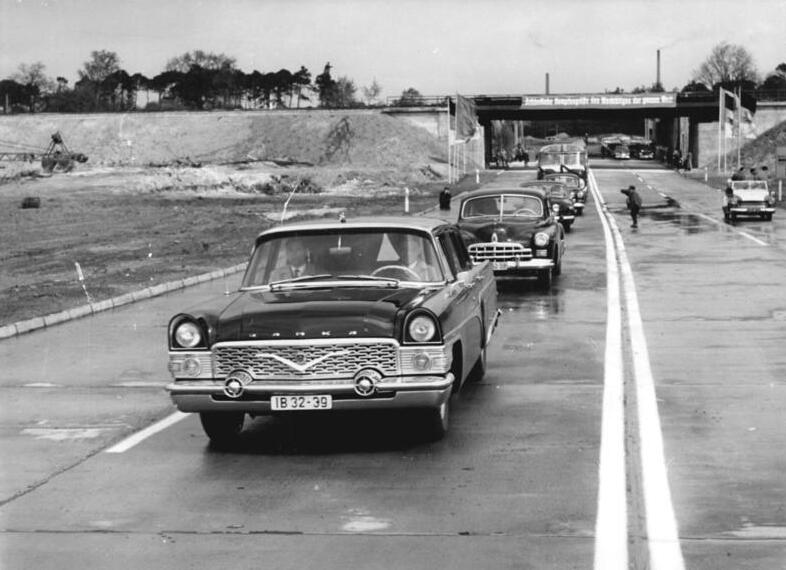
Opening of the Adlergestell in 1962

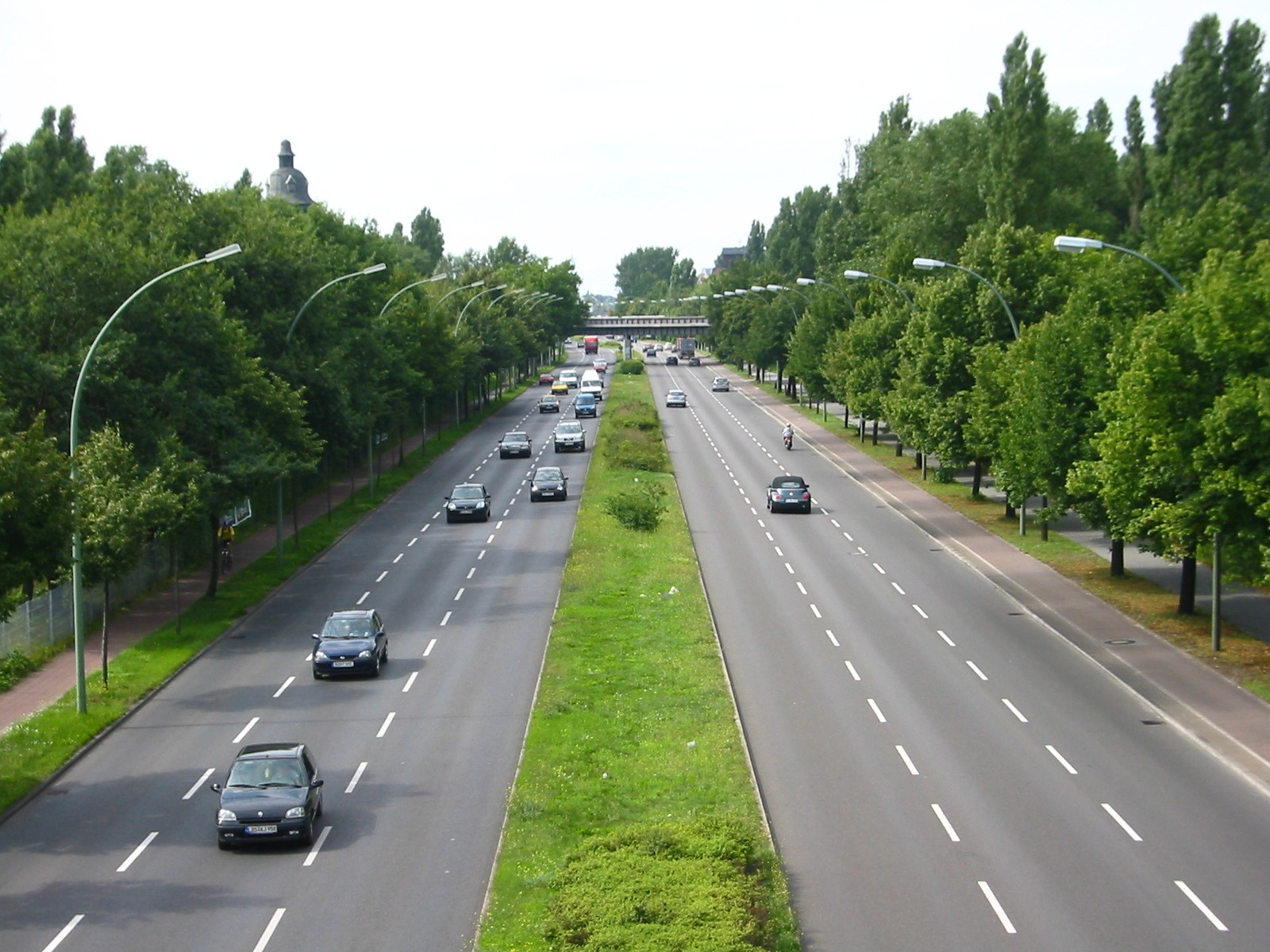
Adlergestell in Niederschöneweide, towards city center

The Adlergestell in the Berlin district of Treptow-Köpenick is the longest road in Berlin at 11.9 kilometers. It runs from the district of Niederschöneweide to the district of Schmöckwitz on the southeastern outskirts of the city. The Berlin–Görlitz railway runs parallel to the Adlergestell.

== Naming ==
The name has been handed down through the ages. It is known that the term "Gestell" was used for the forest roads cut out in the forest, through which felled timber was transported away. This word meaning lives on in the hunter-language still today. Where the name-addition "Adler" comes from, is not known. Folk etymology refers to eagles on tree trunks that served as signposts for the Prussian king when he rode to the castle of Königs Wusterhausen. However, it may also refer to the same root as the name of the Adlershoff estate, which gave its name to the village of Adlershof, which is now a Berlin district of Adlergestell.

The name Adlergestell is circulated that it was formerly called Kurfürstenweg or Reichsapfelstraße, because the trees bordering it were decorated with an apple and an eagle in the time of the Prince-elector. The street began at that time in Berlin at the Alte Jakobstraße, continued along the Köpenicker Straße, through the middle of the Cöllnische Heide and past today's Berlin-Grünau station.

== Traffic ==
Today's Adlergestell begins as a continuation of the Michael-Brückner-Straße (formerly: Grünauer Straße) in Niederschöneweide at the overpass of the S-Bahn line to Spindlersfeld with the property number 73. The road here has six lanes as part of the Bundesstraße 96a and runs in a straight line for about 5.5 kilometers via Adlershof to Grünau. It runs parallel to the Berlin–Görlitz railway, which was based on the Adlergestell in its layout.

From Berlin-Grünau station, the road runs about 6.5 kilometers through the Berlin forest to Schmöckwitz, the southernmost district of Berlin. There it ends with property number 786.

The Adlergestell is one of the most important arterial roads in southern Berlin. During the GDR era, most of the road traffic from East Berlin in a southern and western direction (to Dresden, Leipzig, Magdeburg) ran over the Adlergestell in the direction of Schönefeld. Until 1962, it ran from Adlershof via Köpenicker Straße and the Altglienicke district, then over the expressway (today: Am Seegraben), which was opened in April 1962, along the Bundesstraße 96a. Since October 1962 it has been possible to change from the Bundesstraße 96a at the Treptow junction to the current Bundesautobahn 117. The opening of the last section of the Bundesautobahn 113 in the direction of the Neukölln junction on 23 May 2008 led to a relief of the Adlergestell.

== Development (selection) ==
Along the road, with the development of the settlement areas, residential houses were also built. The core of Schmöckwitz is particularly noteworthy in this respect. Berlin's transport links, in particular the parallel running railroad line, which has a railroad station in each of the districts mentioned, contributed to the settlement. Some of the surviving buildings are listed as Berlin monuments, such as the Bahnbetriebswerk Berlin-Schöneweide and the Reichsbahnausbesserungswerk Berlin-Schöneweide as well as parts of the Adlershof housing estate (Siedlung Adlershof) (between Adlergestell and Anna-Seghers-Strasse) Furthermore, the Bärensiegel factory building on the corner of Glienicker Weg, the old fire station, the streetcar station, and the school in Schmöckwitz as well as other residential buildings are preserved as architectural monuments.

== Bike traffic ==
On the Adlergestell there is a damaged cycle path that is subject to compulsory use, which is criticized by cycling associations as being in urgent need of rehabilitation. It consists of a 50 centimeter wide strip of road, which is shared by cyclists and pedestrians. According to the answer to a written question by the member of parliament Maik Penn (CDU) from 2019, traffic accidents on the Adlergestell have been particularly frequent in the years before, in which cyclists were injured, some of them severely.

On June 30, 2020, the Bezirksamt of Treptow-Köpenick established a pop-up cycle path on the right of the three lanes on a 2.5-kilometer stretch between Sterndamm and Rudower Chaussee out of town.
