= Grünau Cross–Berlin Brandenburg Airport railway =

Railway line in Germany

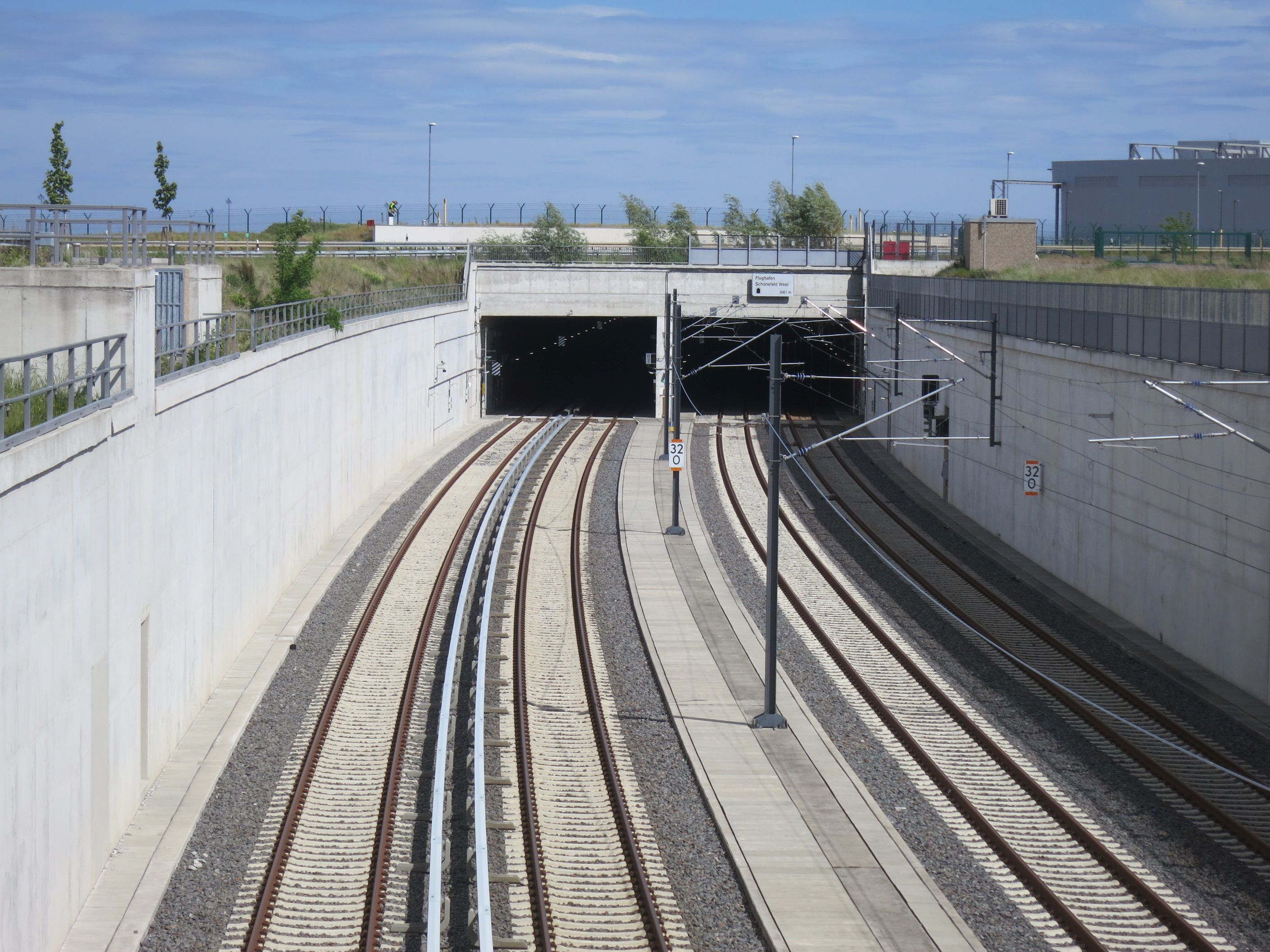
- Entrance to the tunnel under the runway of the airport. On the left is the S-Bahn from Schönefeld and on the right the long-distance line from Glasower Damm.

Overview
- Native name: Bahnstrecke Grünauer Kreuz–Flughafen Berlin Brandenburg
- Line number: 6008
- Locale: Berlin and Brandenburg, Germany

Technical
- Line length: 13.6 km (8.5 mi)
- Electrification: 750 V DC third rail

The Grünau Cross–Berlin Brandenburg Airport railway is a railway line in the south of Berlin, the capital of Germany, and in the adjacent areas of Brandenburg. It is used by the Berlin S-Bahn. The first, 5.9-kilometre-long (3.7 mi) section was opened in 1962 and served mainly as a connection to Berlin Schönefeld Airport and the associated long-distance station. In 2011, a 7.7-kilometre-long (4.8 mi) extension went into operation to connect with Berlin Brandenburg Airport (BER). Due to delays in the commissioning of BER Airport, this section has only been used for public transport since October 2020.

== History ==
The only railway between the radial Berlin–Dresden and Berlin–Görlitz railways until the 1930s was the Neukölln-Mittenwalde Railway, which was also a radial line. The latter also served the village of Schönefeld. Plans for a tangential connection with Berlin's developing railway bypass had been developed for several decades, but they were only actually realised west of the Berlin–Halle railway (Anhalter Bahn). During the Nazi period, the Outer Freight Ring (Güteraußenring, GAR) was built to a temporary low standard; this ran in the area of the southern Berlin city boundary from the Berlin–Halle railway to the east. After the Second World War, passenger traffic ran briefly between Berlin-Grünau and Lichtenrade via Schönefeld and later, between 1955 and 1958, passenger traffic ran again from Grünau to Großziethen.

As a result of the divisions of Germany and Berlin, through rail traffic between most of the surrounding areas and West Berlin (with the exception of the S-Bahn) was cut off in the early 1950s. The traffic ran from the southern radial lines over the beginning of the Berlin outer ring (Berliner Außenring, BAR), which was built in the eastern part of Berlin in the 1950s. Since it was still possible to move largely unhindered between the eastern and western parts of the city, control stations were also set up at the borders between East Berlin and the surrounding area where passengers were checked before they travelled to Berlin. Such a control station was also built in Schönefeld. The station did not serve public transport, but travellers passing through Berlin-Schönefeld Airport, which was opened for civil use in 1955, could use the trains stopping there.

In order to improve access to the airport, an S-Bahn line was planned to the airport as early as 1958. There were also considerations of extending the line to the west to Rangsdorf or along the BAR to Ludwigsfelde. The construction of the Berlin Wall on 13 August 1961 made a railway connection even more urgent. Travellers from the areas to the south of Berlin would be able to change to the S-Bahn in Schönefeld. So soon afterwards work started on the construction of the line.

=== S-Bahn line to Schönefeld Airport ===
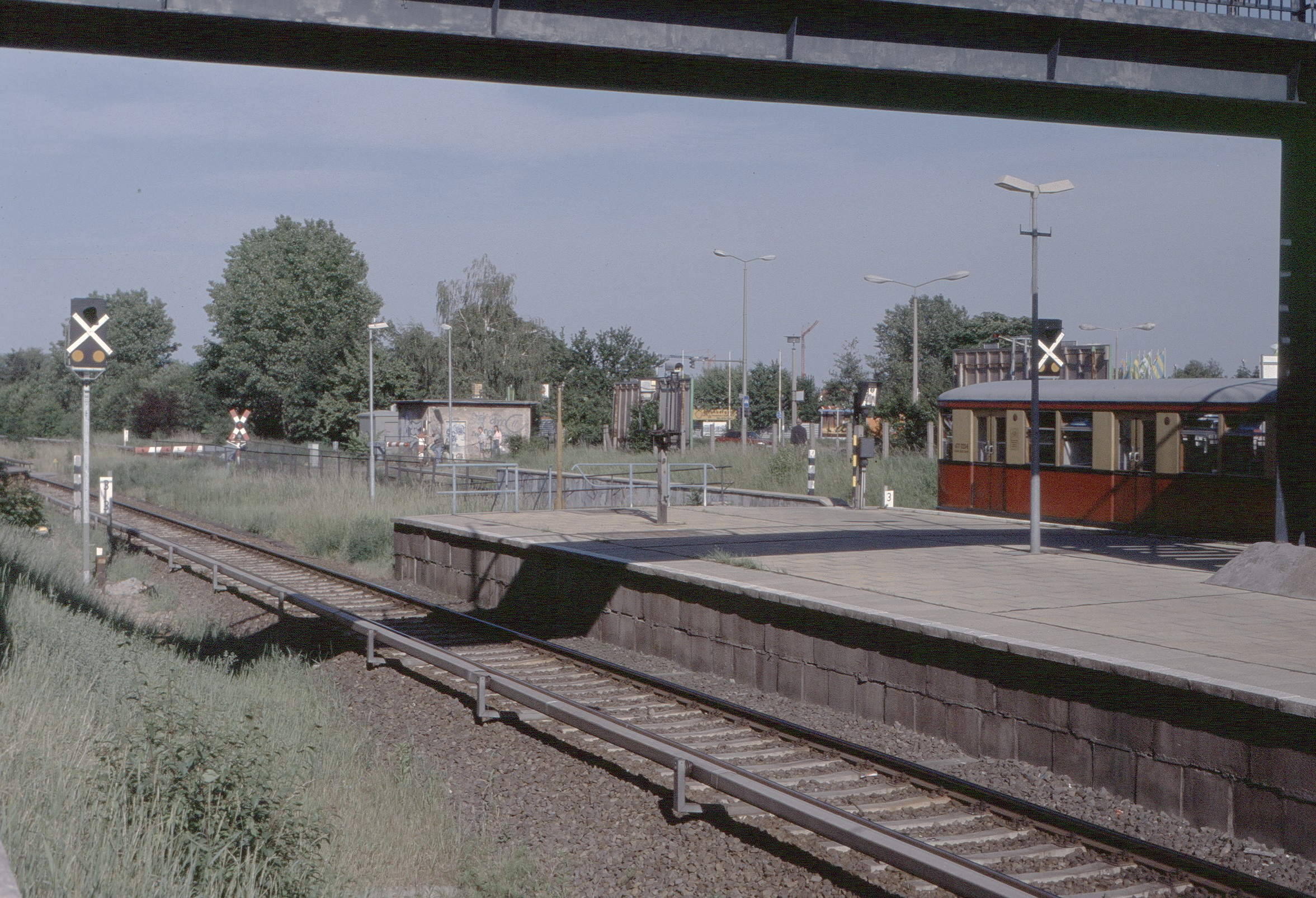
Grünbergallee S-Bahn station, looking to the east in 2000

Work on the line began at the end of September 1961. A second track was built between Altglienicke and Schoenefeld (except under the Waltersdorfer Chaussee underpass) and the infrastructure in the Altglienicke area had to be rebuilt so that an approach road to an expressway could be built next to the railway. The Germanenstraße road bridge was demolished and replaced by a pedestrian bridge with platform access. Grünbergallee station (originally planned with the name of Falkenhöhe) was rebuilt and the former halt of Schönefeld Siedlung on the Outer Freight Ring was closed. The facilities of Schoenefeld station, now serviced by ordinary public transport services, were extended slightly. A new S-Bahn platform and a pedestrian bridge were built and a station building was built in 1962. Nevertheless, the station remained provisional for a long time.

The line went into operation on 26 February 1962, but Grünbergallee station did not open until 27 May 1962. A possible extension of the S-Bahn along the outer ring towards Wuhlheide was prepared at the Grünau Cross (Grünauer Kreuz), where the BAR crosses the Berlin–Görlitz railway. The power supply of the line was built with a provisional substation at Grünau Cross, which was later replaced by a new building.

From 1985 to 1987, the section between Grünau Cross and Altglienicke was upgraded to two tracks. This increased the efficiency of the line. The ultimate goal was to allow a third group of services (i.e., three trains per direction at 20-minute intervals) to better serve the new development areas in the Altglienicke area. However, this increase in services did not occur. The last single-track section under the Waltersdorfer Chaussee bridge was eliminated in 1991.

=== Extension to Berlin-Brandenburg Airport ===
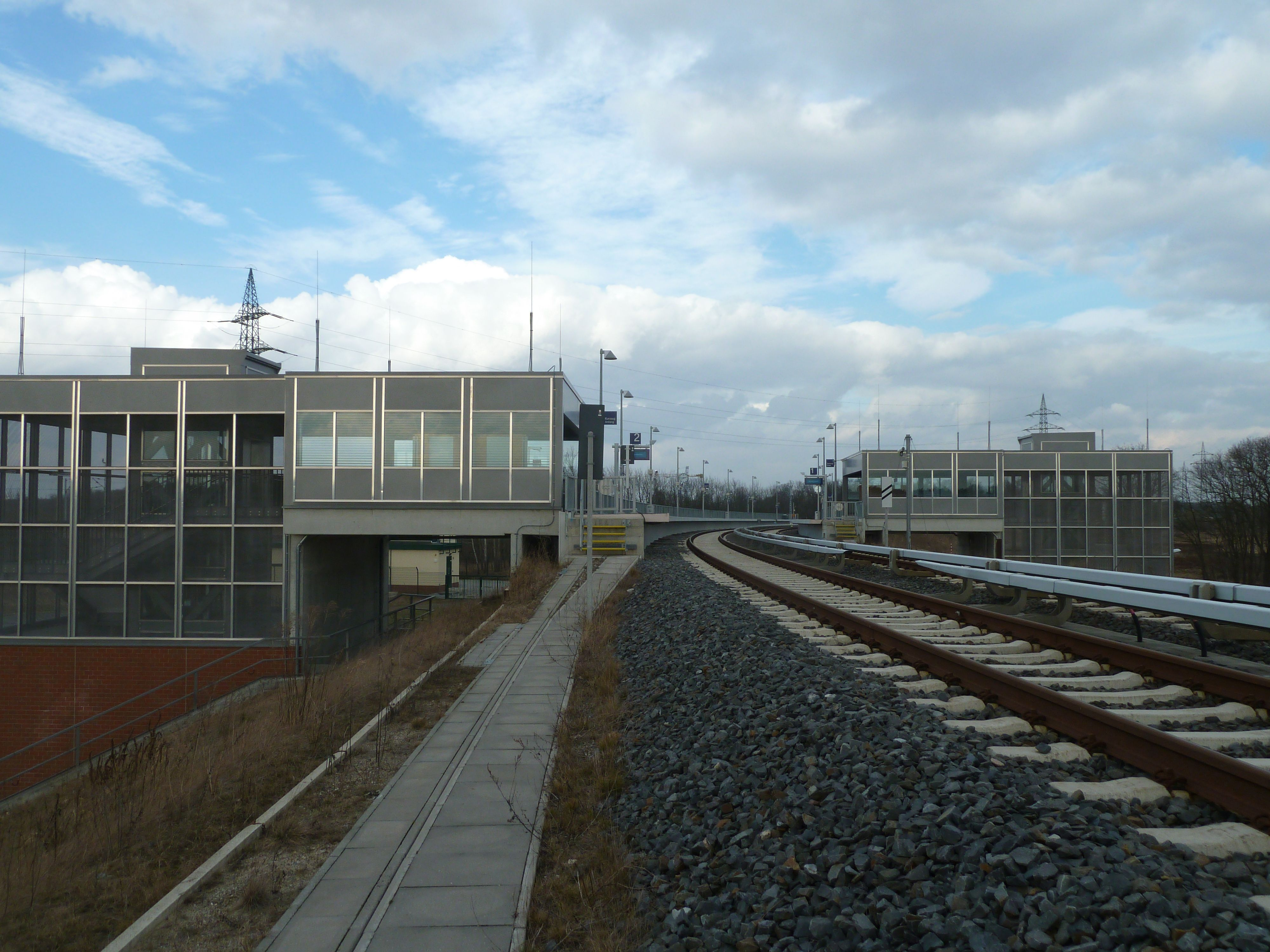
Waßmannsdorf S-Bahn station

In the 1990s, the Schönefeld area was chosen when the location of a new major airport for Berlin was examined. An area in the southern part of the existing airport was chosen as the location for the new terminal building. Various concepts for its connection to Berlin were investigated. Two options for an S-Bahn connection were favoured: on the one hand, an underground connection from the existing Schönefeld station under the runway and, on the other hand, an east–west connection from Blankenfelde station on the Dresden Railway through the airport station and continuing to the Görlitz Railway.

Neither of these options were chosen. Instead, a connection was built that runs around the airport from the old Schönefeld station in a large loop to the north and then reaches the new airport station in a tunnel from the west together with the mainline railway. It uses two tracks of the four tracks of the Berlin outer ring that were built in the 1980s but were no longer needed due to falling freight traffic and changed traffic flows to Berlin since reunification. Originally, no intermediate station was planned, but the community of Schönefeld financed the construction of Waßmannsdorf station. The new line and a long-distance railway have been in operation since 31 October 2011. Originally the Berlin-Brandenburg Airport was supposed to begin operations on the same day. However, there have been extensive delays to its construction. It is now not expected to be open before the Autumn of 2020. After January 2012, route training for train drivers was carried out on the new line, but these were stopped when the opening of the airport was delayed. However, some train trips continued to be made to keep the line operational and to ventilate the underground airport station. Regular S-Bahn services finally began at the end of October 2020, shortly before the airport opened.

=== Passenger services ===
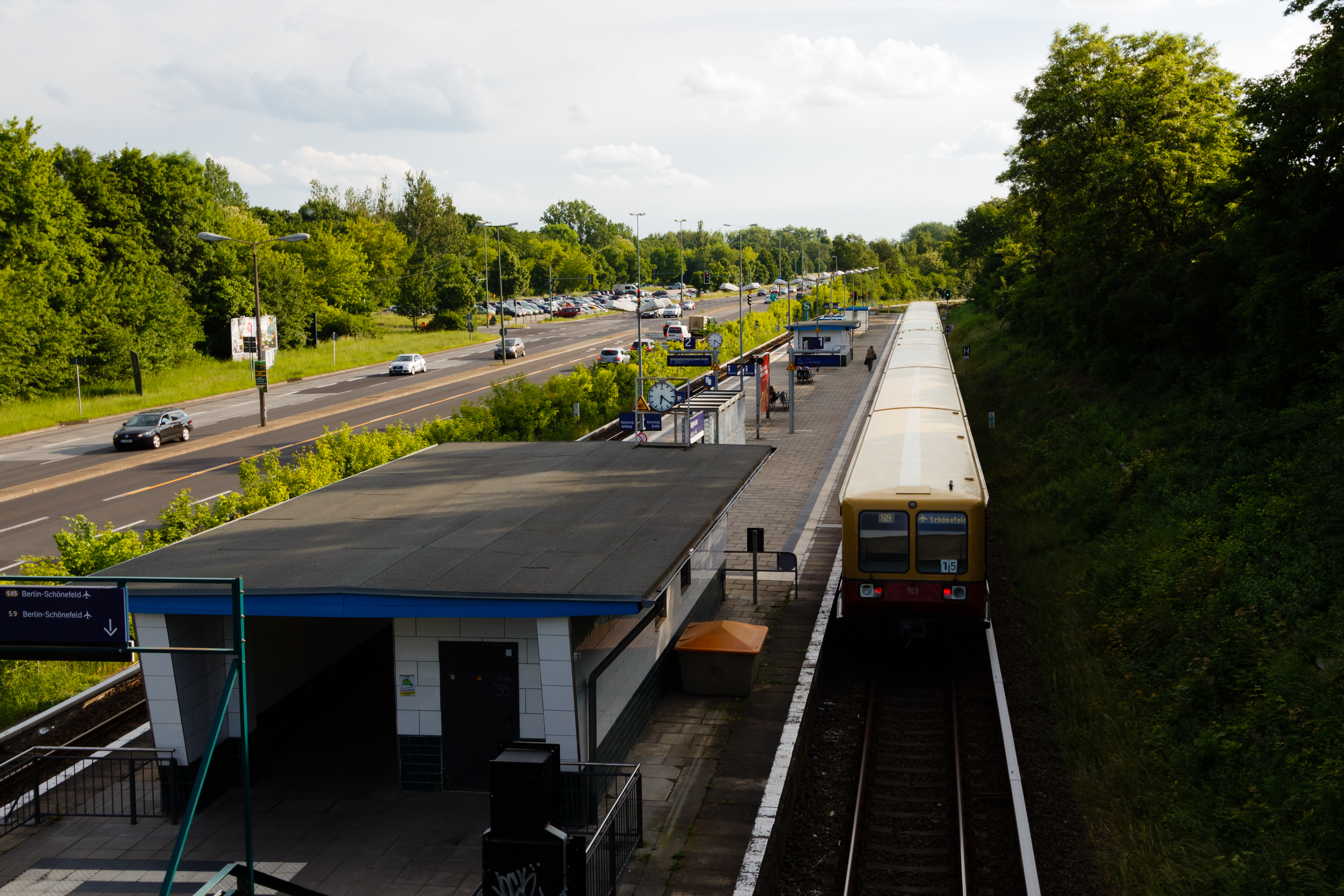
S-Bahn train in Altglienicke station

Shortly after the opening of the line, it was operated with two S-Bahn train groups, that is two trains per direction at 20-minute intervals. In 1962, the Bernau – central Schönefeld airport train group (running during the whole operating day) and the Friedrichstrasse – Schönefeld train group (not running during the evening) served the line. A few years later, the latter train group operated during the entire operating time to/from the Berlin Stadtbahn. Since then, it has been the main train group on the line. In 1990, it was extended in the western part of the city to Charlottenburg and sometimes to Westkreuz. Since 1991, it has carried the line number of S9. Because of the construction work at Ostkreuz, it has not run on the Stadtbahn since 2009, but instead runs to Pankow or Blankenburg, but after the completion of the connection curve, services will return to the Stadtbahn.

The second train group to Schönefeld has changed several times. For a long time there were continuous connections between Schönefeld and Oranienburg. Since the end of 2002, the S 45 line has been operating from Schönefeld via Baumschulenweg to the southern Ringbahn. The terminus of the line (as of 2016) is generally Südkreuz, with some trains continuing Bundesplatz. Since the completion of the new airport in October 2020, these two services now terminate at Berlin Brandenburg Airport station.

== Route ==
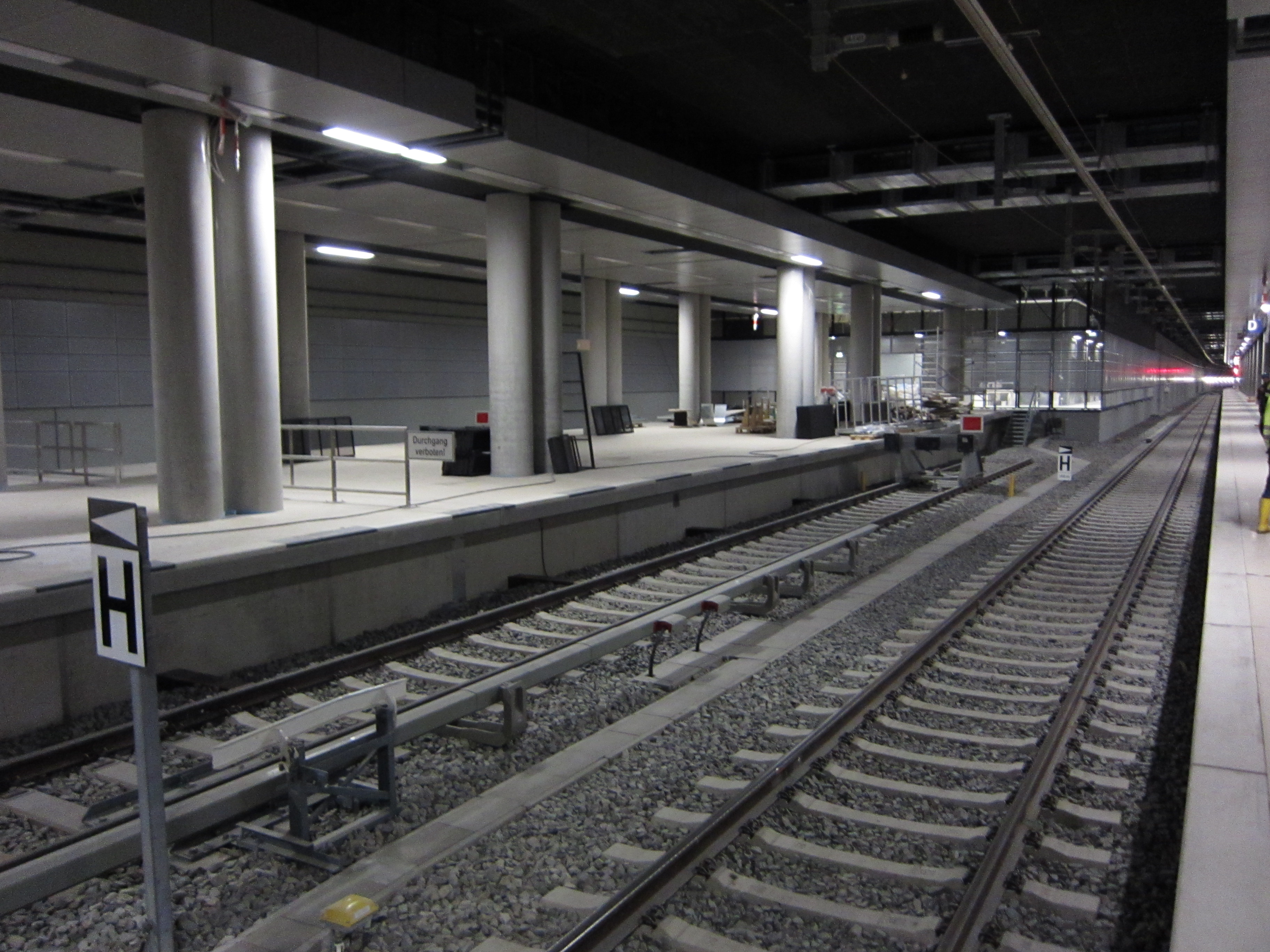
View of the S-Bahn platform in Berlin Brandenburg Airport station

The line starts in Grünau Cross, where the Berlin outer ring crosses the Berlin–Görlitz railway. The many connecting curves allow trains to operate in all directions. For the S-Bahn, the only branch in this area is the separation of the line to the airport from the S-Bahn line along the Görlitz Railway towards Grünau and Königs Wusterhausen. The line to the airport turns to the southwest and initially uses the former route of the Outer Freight Ring. Altglienicke station is located, together with a feeder road to an autobahn, in a cutting between the districts of Altglienicke and Bohnsdorf. The line runs to the west and reaches Grünbergallee station. On the same street there is one of the few level crossings on the Berlin S-Bahn network.

The line crosses the Berlin city limits and again meets the Berlin outer ring. Berlin Schönefeld Airport station has an island platform for the S-Bahn with two S-Bahn tracks; it formerly had three island platforms for mainline services. Originally, no extension of the S-Bahn line was planned. Therefore, the extension of the S-Bahn line continues on the axis of the former long-distance tracks from the southern island platform, which was therefore taken out of service. The outer ring had been four-tracked in this area in the 1980s. The new S-Bahn line uses the two southern tracks of the outer ring. It follows the ring for several kilometres and turns to the south in Waßmannsdorf and runs into Waßmannsdorf station, which is built on an embankment. At Selchow the line meets the long-distance tracks of the Glasower Damm Ost–Bohnsdorf Süd railway and they run together initially in a trough, then through a several kilometre-long tunnel to the east and then northeast to Berlin Brandenburg Airport. This is where the S-Bahn line ends, while the long-distance train tracks continue to the Görlitz Railway. The airport station is only about 2.5 kilometres (1.6 mi) in a direct line from Schönefeld station, while the S-Bahn line between the two stations is 7.7 kilometres (4.8 mi) long.

With the construction of the extension of the line, a new turnback facility was built in Schönefeld station. There is no turnback facility in the new airport station, so trains reverse at the platform. The airport station is controlled by a computer-based interlocking in Selchow.

== Notes ==
=== Sources ===
Kuhlmann, Bernd (1996). Schönefeld bei Berlin. Ein Amt, ein Flughafen und elf Bahnhöfe (in German). Berlin: Verlag GVE. p. 28. ISBN 3-89218-038-5.
