= BWAF =

BWAF may refer to:

- Beijing Workers' Autonomous Federation, a defunct Chinese workers' organization
- BWAF, the DS100 code for Waßmannsdorf station, Brandenburg, Germany
