= Selchow (Schönefeld) =

Village in Brandenburg, Germany

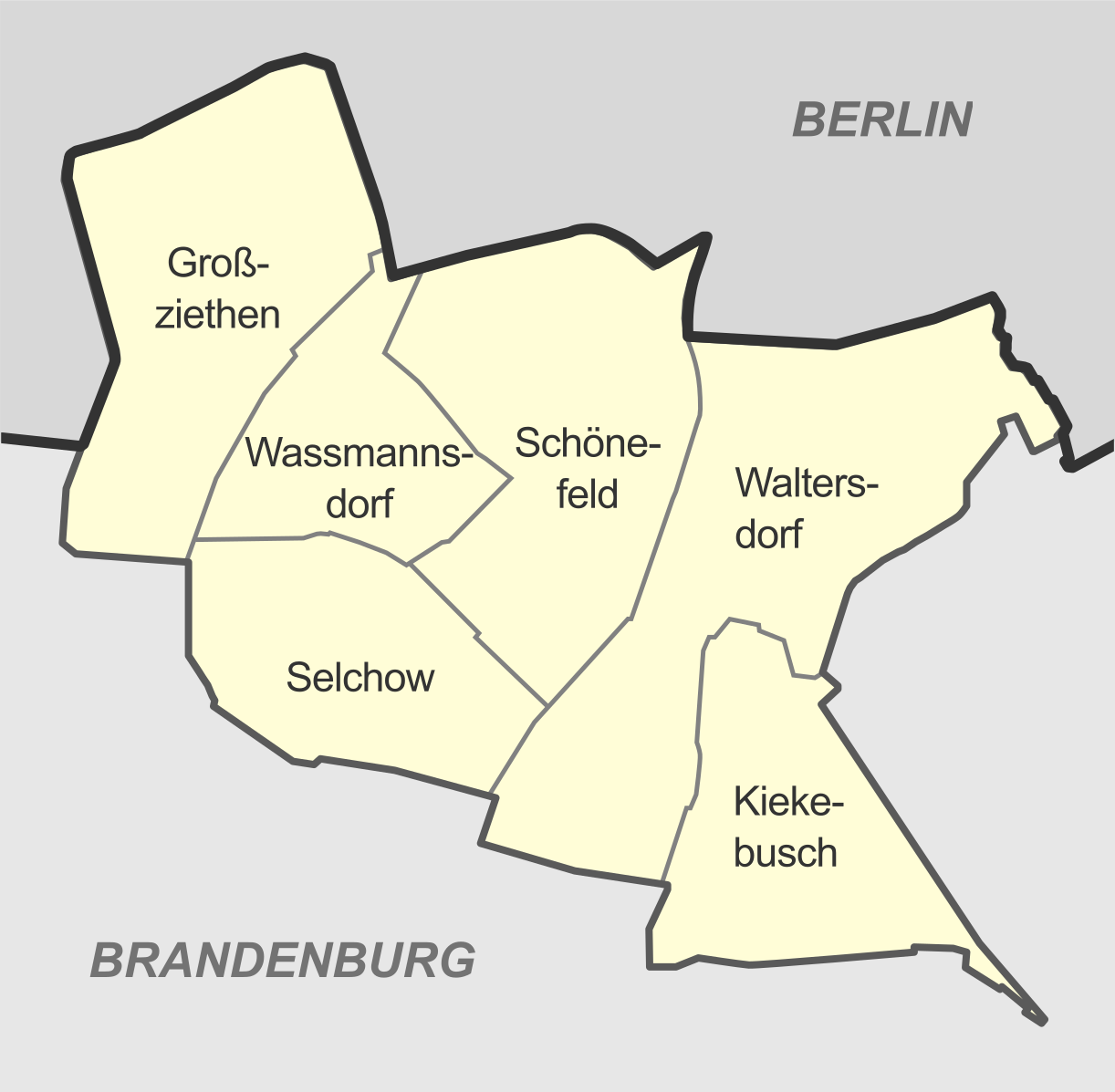
Districts of the Schönefeld municipality, including Selchow

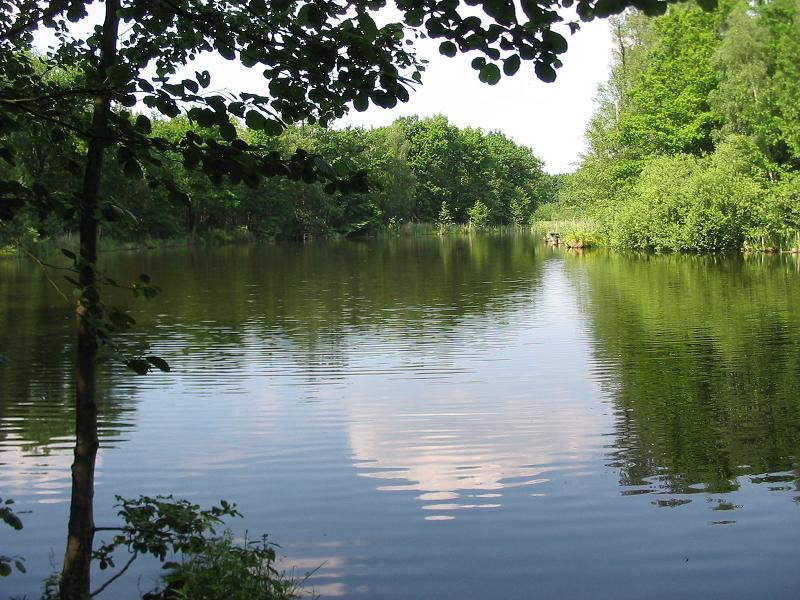
Lake Selchow (Selchower See), between Selchow und Mahlow

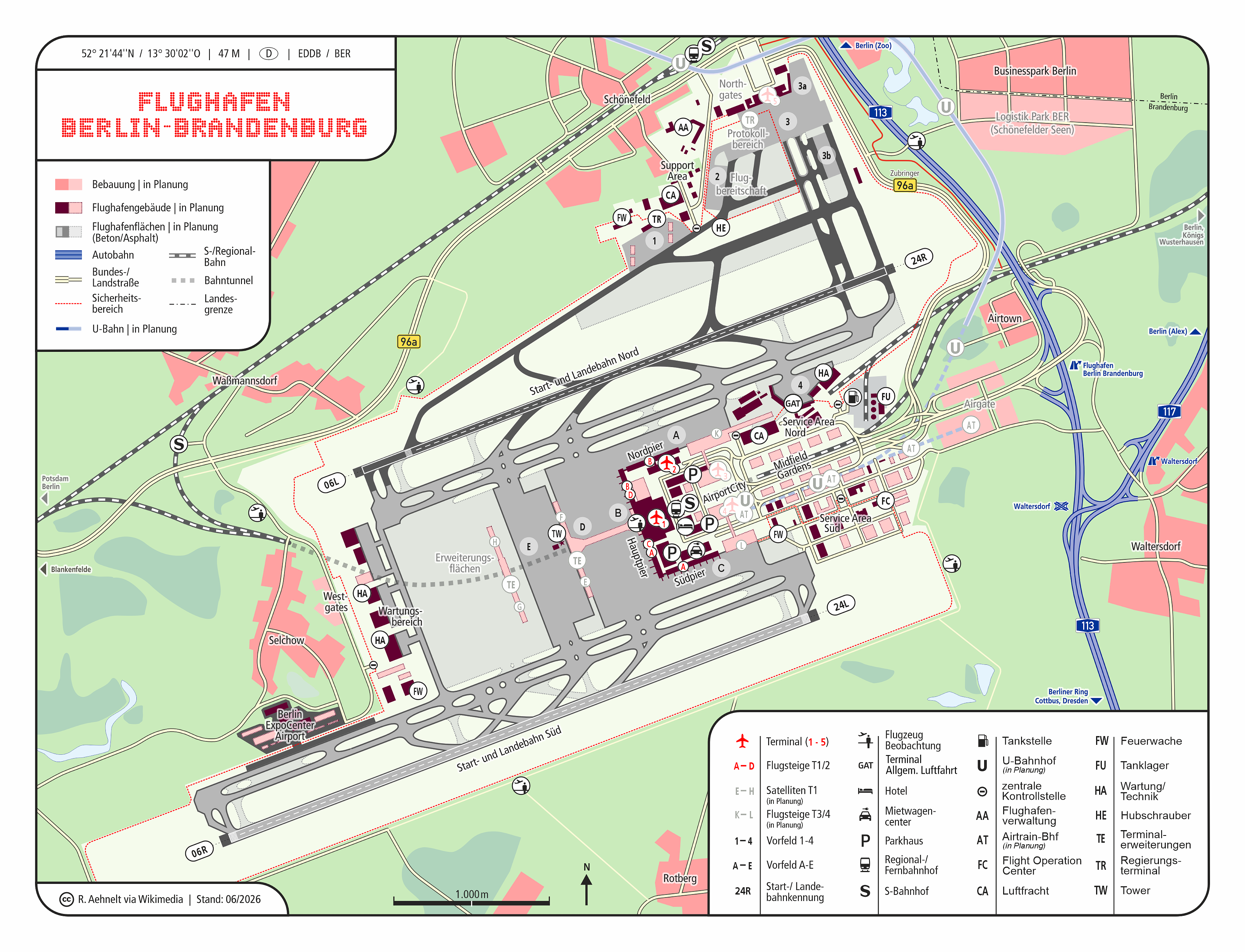
Selchow's location between the two runways of Berlin Brandenburg Airport (BER)

The small village of Selchow is one of the six districts of the municipality of Schönefeld in the district of Dahme-Spreewald south of Berlin, Germany. It borders in its east and south directly on the Berlin Brandenburg Airport (BER) and lies between its southern and the end of the northern runway.

== Geographical classification ==
Selchow borders clockwise on the following villages (starting in the north): Waßmannsdorf, Schönefeld, Groß-Kienitz, Glasow, Mahlow and Großziethen.

== Traffic ==
The Bundesstraße 96a runs through Selchow, as well as the Landesstraße 75. The Bundesstraße 96 is connected to the west via the country road. The nearest freeway junction is the Schönefeld-Süd junction of the Bundesautobahn 113.

The village is connected to Waßmannsdorf station via the bus line 742.

== Places of interest ==
- The village church of Selchow is a Romanesque fieldstone church from the first half of the 13th century. The windows were partly enlarged around 1700; the building was restored in 1972 and 1973. Inside there is, among other things, a two-storey pulpit altar and a fifth from 1710 as well as a crucifix, which was created at the end of the 15th century.
- Lake Selchow (Selchower See)

== Crest ==
Blazon: "On a blue background above a green shield base a silver church in side view. In the heraldically left upper corner two opposite horseshoes in S-shape, placed one inside the other.

The coat of arms reflects prominent points of the village, on the one hand the church and on the other hand the horses, which outnumber the inhabitants. The horseshoe arrangement as S comes from the first letter of the village name.
