= BFY =

BFY may refer to:

- Bremenfly (ICAO code BFY), a German charter airline
- Bengbu Tenghu Airport (IATA code BFY), an airport in China
- Bagheli language (ISO 639-3 code bfy), a Hindi language of the Baghelkhand region of central India
- BFY Brands, American snack company that was acquired by PepsiCo in 2019
