= Schönefeld (bei Berlin) station =

Railway station in Germany

Schönefeld (b Berlin)
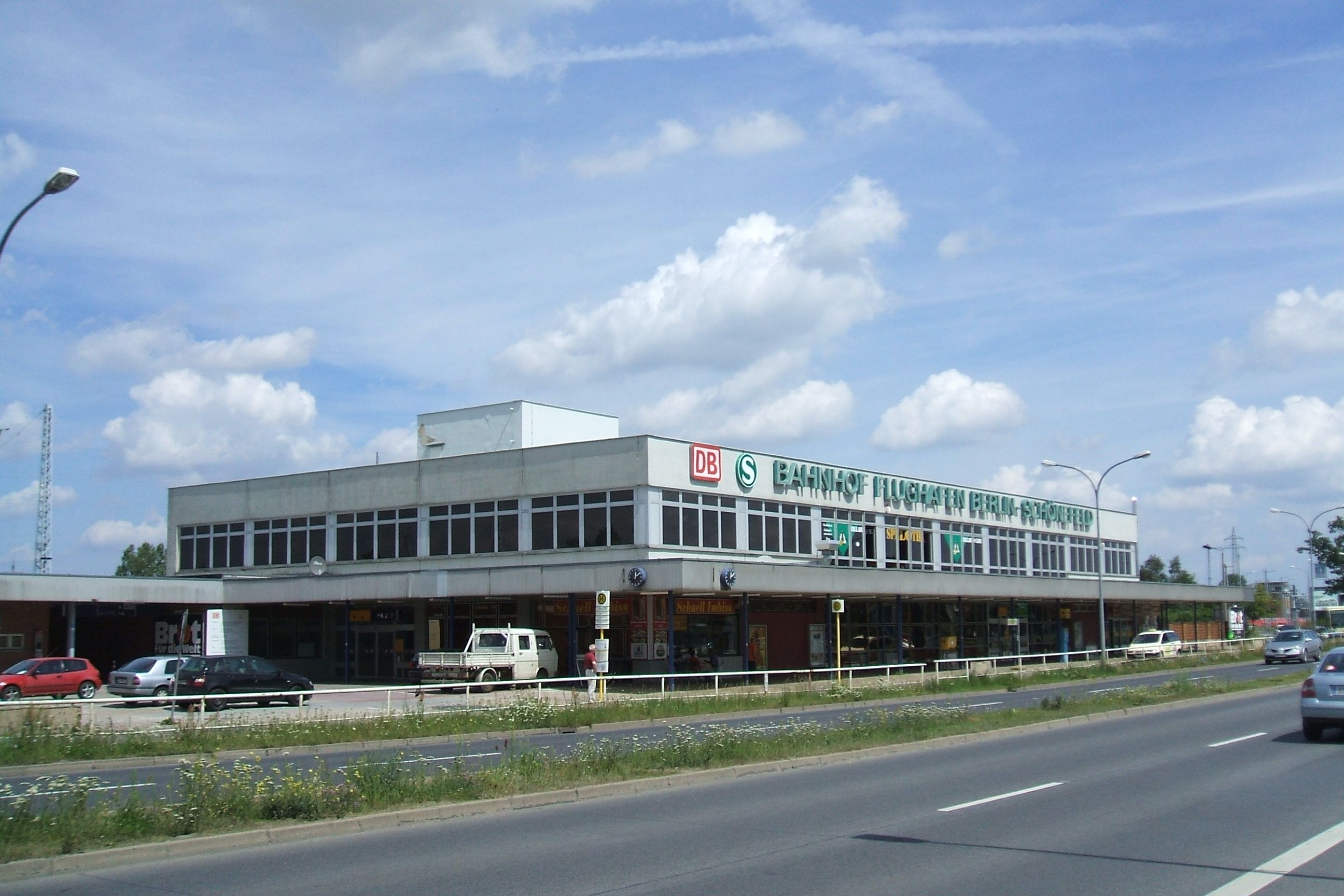

General information
- Location: Schönefeld, Brandenburg; Germany
- Coordinates: 52°23′29″N 13°30′46″E
- Owner: DB InfraGO
- Lines: Berlin Outer Ring (KBS 207, 209.22); Grünau Cross–Berlin Brandenburg Airport (KBS 200.45, 200.9)
- Platforms: 3 (long distance); 2 (S-Bahn)

Construction
- Accessible: Yes

Other information
- Station code: 1821
- DS100 code: BTL
- IBNR: 8010109
- Category: 3
- Fare zone: : Berlin C/5957
- Website: www.bahnhof.de

History
- Opened: 10 July 1951; 75 years ago
- Electrified: 27 February 1962; 64 years ago, 750 V DC system (3rd rail); main line: 29 May 1983; 43 years ago, 15 kV AC system (overhead)
- Former names: Schönefeld (b. Berlin) (1951–1962); Zentralflughafen Schönefeld (1962); Zentralflughafen Berlin-Schönefeld (1962–1976); Berlin-Schönefeld Flughafen (1976–2020); BER Airport – Terminal 5 (2020–December 2023)

Passengers
- < 10,000 per day

Services
Preceding station	Berlin S-Bahn	Following station
Waßmannsdorf towards BER Airport	S45	Grünbergallee towards Südkreuz
Waßmannsdorf towards BER Airport	S9	Grünbergallee towards Spandau
Preceding station	DB Regio Nordost	Following station
Terminus	Flughafen-Express Limited service	Berlin Ostkreuz towards Berlin-Charlottenburg
Location

Schönefeld (bei Berlin) station (German: Bahnhof Schönefeld (bei Berlin)) (formerly named Berlin Schönefeld Airport station and BER Airport – Terminal 5 station) is railway station in Schönefeld next to the former Berlin Schönefeld Airport (briefly renamed as Terminal 5 and now defunct), just outside Berlin. The station is on the Grünau Cross–Berlin Brandenburg Airport railway and is served by S-Bahn lines S9 and S45.

== History ==
=== Schönefeld Airport ===
Berlin-Schönefeld railway station was built within 150 days and opened for the public on 10 July 1951 as part of the Berliner Außenring. On 26 February 1962, an additional platform was added and Schönefeld was connected to the Berlin S-Bahn.

=== Berlin Brandenburg Airport ===
From May to October 2020, Intercity 17 (Dresden-Berlin-Rostock/Warnemünde) stopped in Schönefeld. Since the opening of BER, it serves BER Airport station instead.

On 25 October 2020, the station was renamed to "Flughafen BER – Terminal 5" to reflect the re-development of Schönefeld Airport into an operational terminal of Berlin Brandenburg Airport. A few days later all train services except the S-Bahn switched to the new Terminal 1 station.

Despite the shutdown of Terminal 5 in early 2021, the station continues to be served to the same extent as during Terminal 5's existence as a part of BER, as the Terminal then hosted a vaccination center for the administration of COVID-19 vaccines.

Due to the indefinite closure of Terminal 5, this station was renamed Schönefeld (bei Berlin) station in December 2023, reflecting it is no longer an airport station.

== Train services ==
The station is served by the following S-Bahn services:

Line	Route	Interval
S9	Flughafen BER – Schönefeld – Schöneweide – Warschauer Straße – Ostbahnhof – Alexanderplatz – Friedrichstraße – Hauptbahnhof – Zoologischer Garten – Charlottenburg – Westkreuz – Spandau	20 min
S85	Flughafen BER – Schönefeld – Schöneweide – Ostkreuz – Bornholmer Straße – Pankow – Frohnau	20 min

== Gallery ==
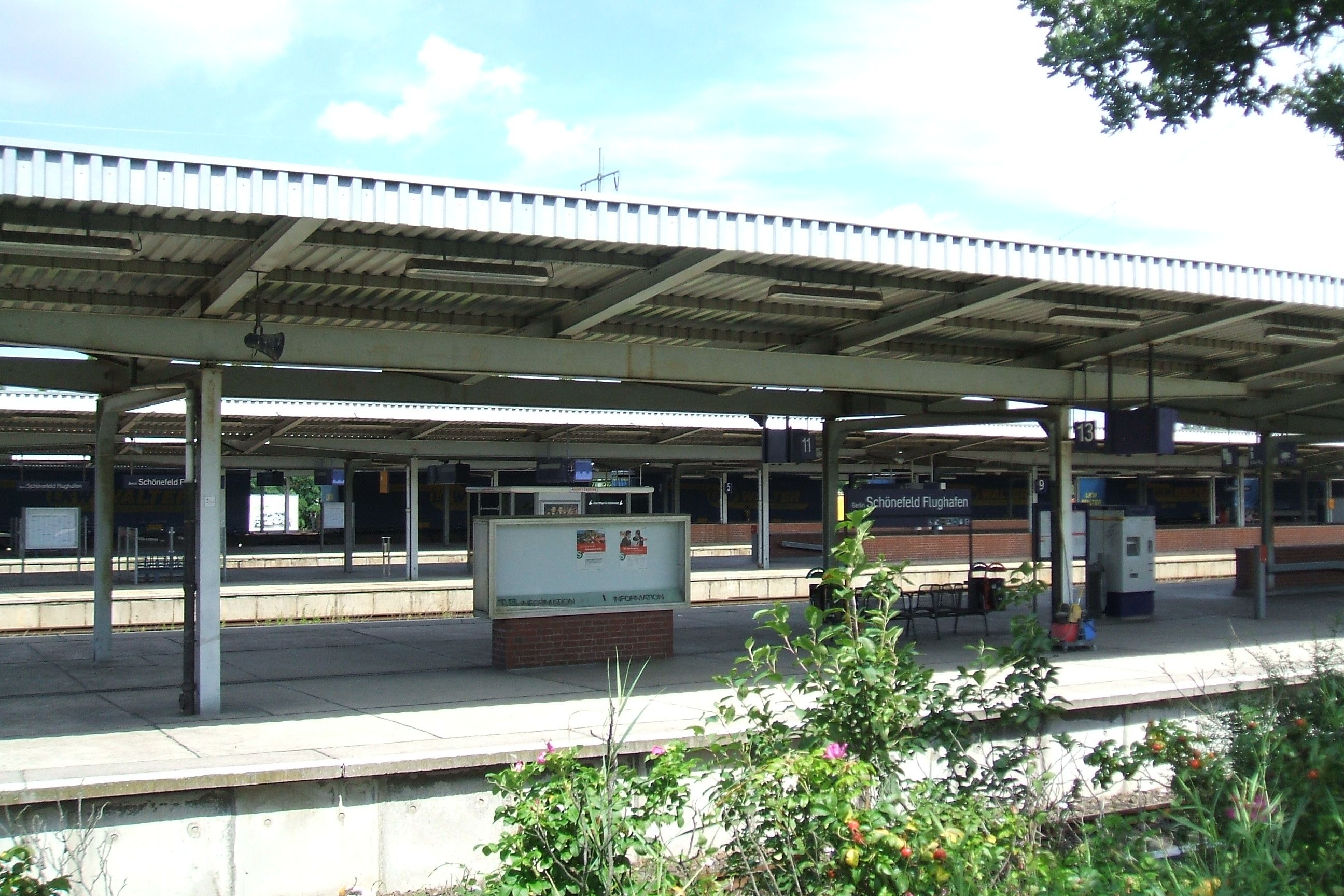
Platform

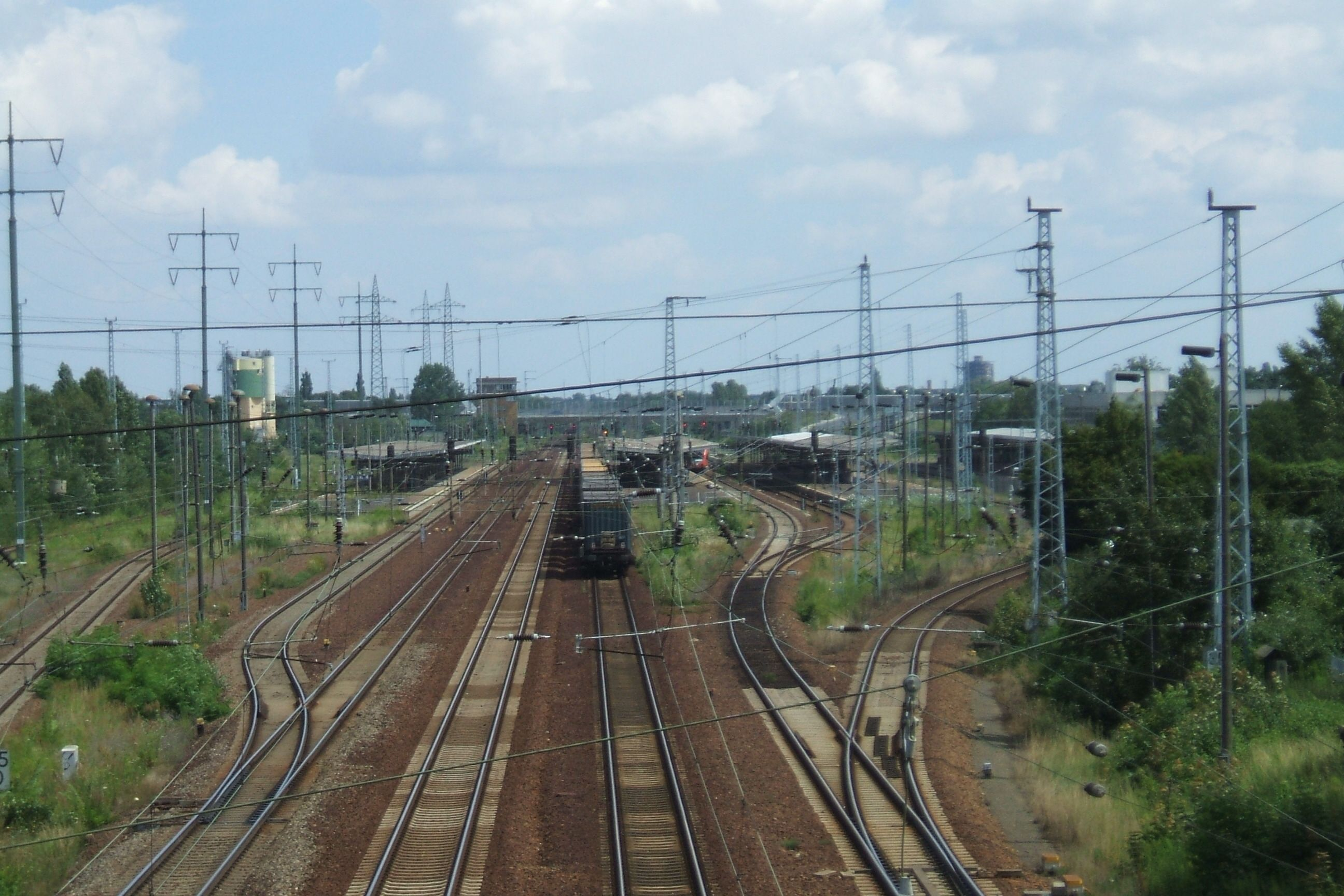
View from western overpass

== See also ==
- BER Airport station
