= Grünbergallee station =

Railway station in Berlin, Germany

Coordinates: 52.3992°N 13.5416°E

Grünbergallee
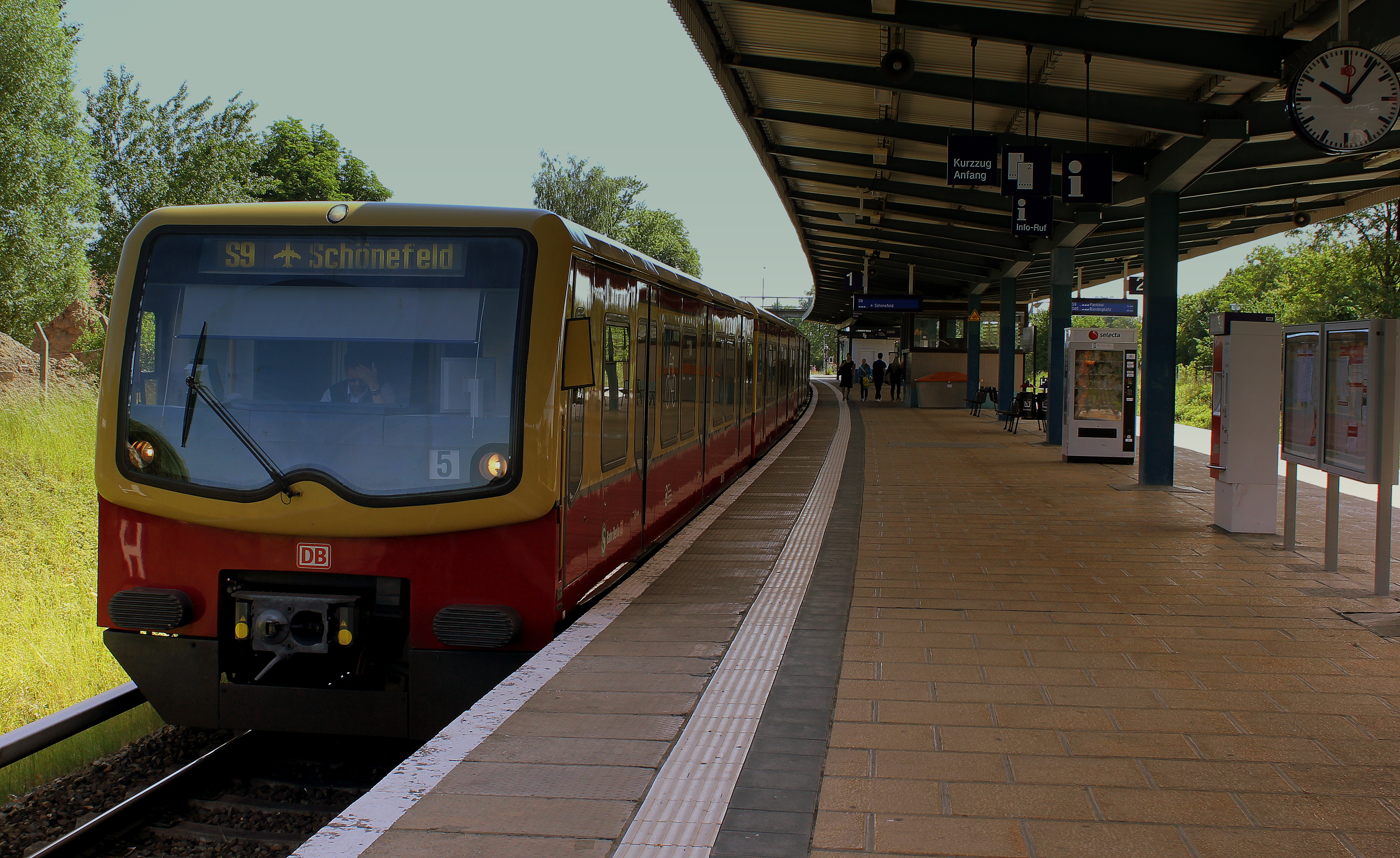
- 2013

General information
- Location: Treptow-Köpenick; Germany
- Owner: DB Netz
- Operator: DB Station&Service
- Line: Grünau Cross–Berlin Brandenburg Airport railway
- Platforms: 2
- Tracks: 2
- Train operators: S-Bahn Berlin
- Connections: S85 S9

Other information
- Fare zone: VBB: Berlin B/5656
- Website: www.bahnhof.de

History
- Opened: 27 May 1962; 64 years ago

Services
Preceding station	Berlin S-Bahn	Following station
Altglienicke towards Waidmannslust	S85	Schönefeld (bei Berlin) towards Grünau
Altglienicke towards Spandau	S9	Schönefeld (bei Berlin) towards BER Airport
Location

Grünbergallee is a railway station on the Grünau Cross–Berlin Brandenburg Airport railway in the Treptow-Köpenick district of Berlin. It is served by the S-Bahn line S85 and S9.

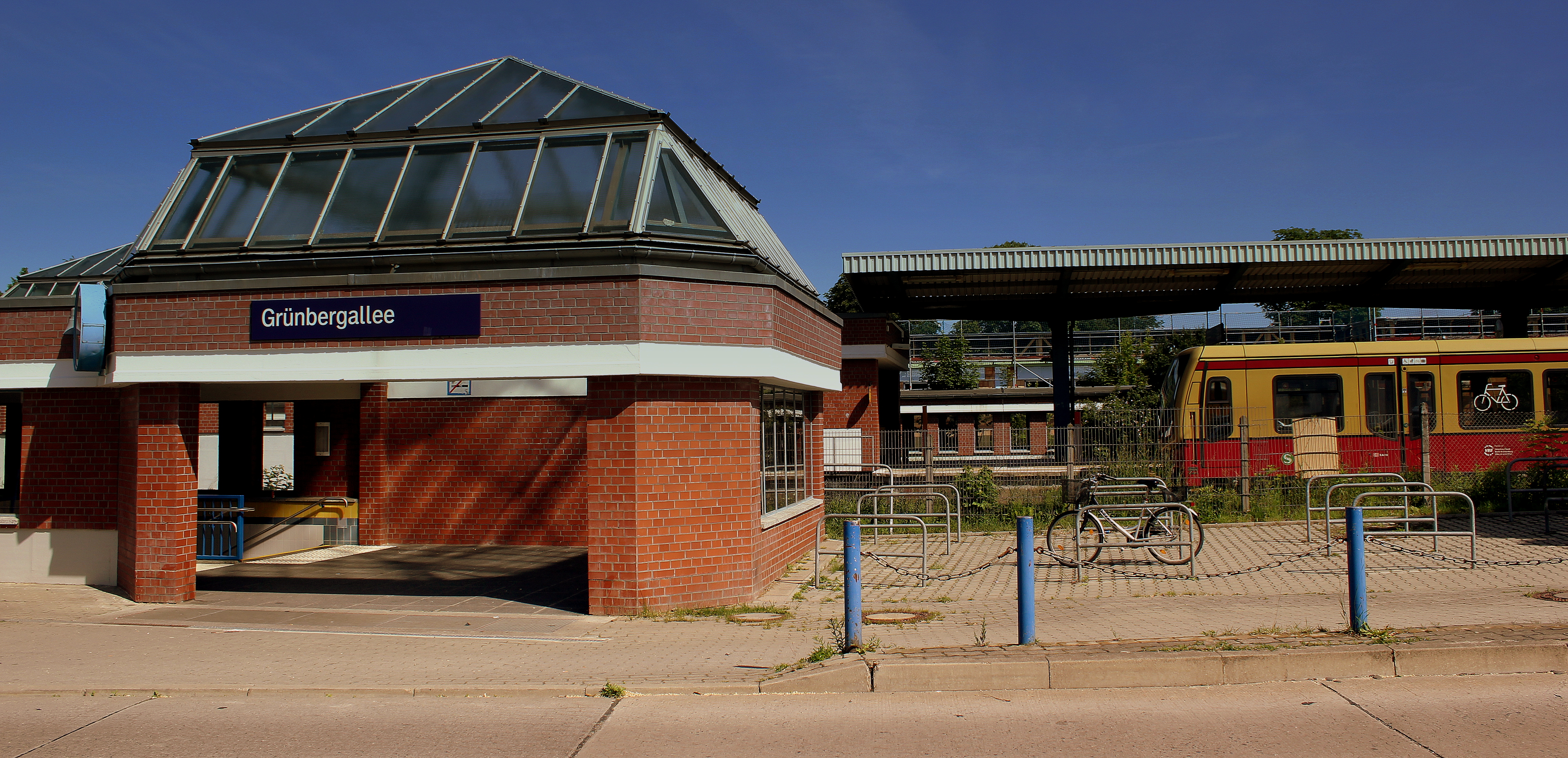
Station building in 2013
