= Waßmannsdorf station =

Station of the S-Bahn Berlin, Germany

Waßmannsdorf
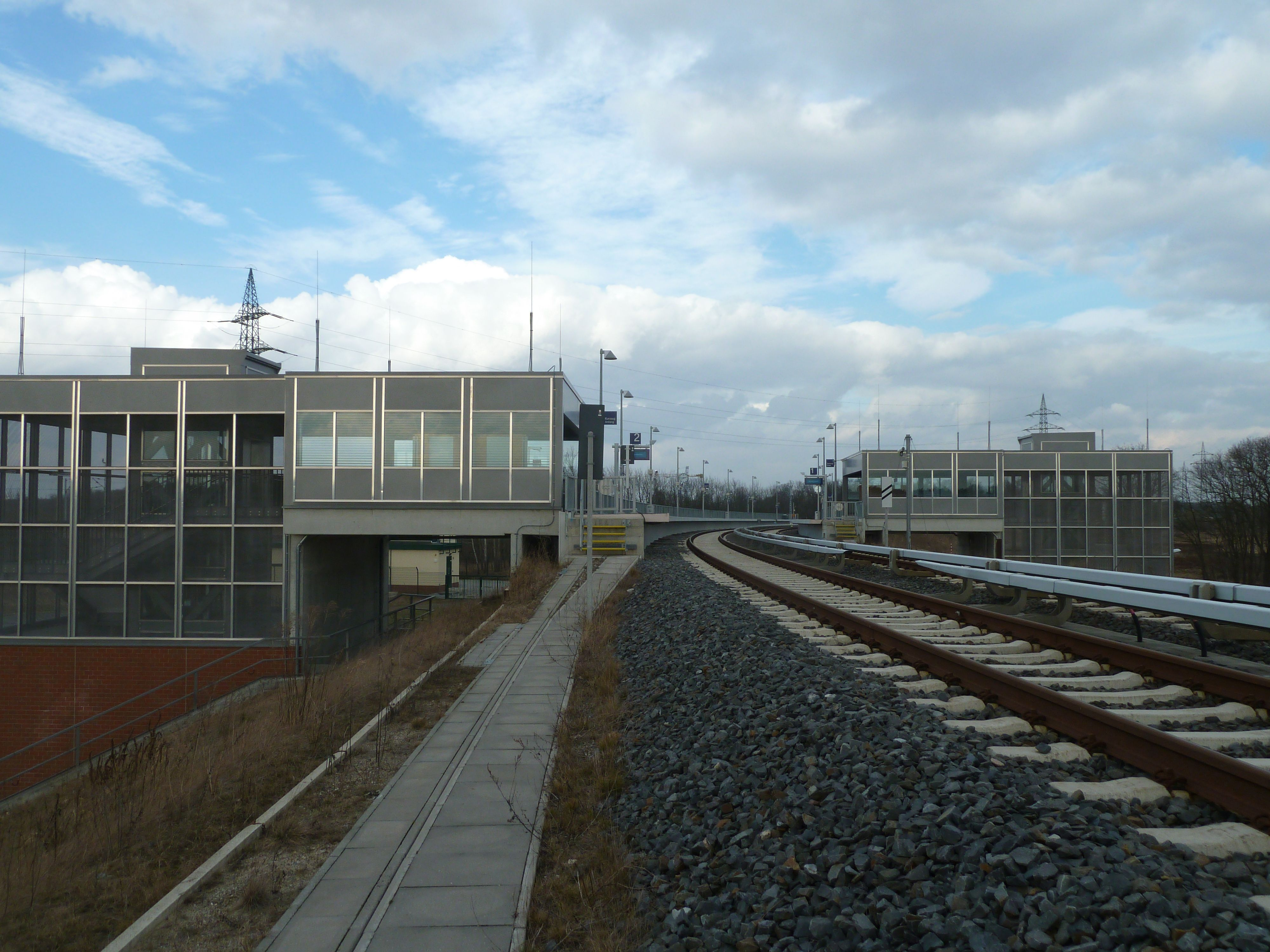
- View of the two buildings and platforms

General information
- Location: Albert-Kiekebusch-Straße; 12259 Waßmannsdorf; Brandenburg; Germany
- Coordinates: 52°22′6.13″N 13°27′49.2″E
- Owner: Deutsche Bahn
- Operator: DB Netz; DB Station&Service
- Lines: Grünauer Kreuz–Berlin Brandenburg Airport (lines S45 and S9)
- Platforms: 2 side platforms
- Tracks: 2
- Connections: 600 720 742 743

Construction
- Accessible: yes

Other information
- Station code: 8214
- DS100 code: BWAF
- IBNR: 8013241
- Category: 5
- Fare zone: Verkehrsverbund Berlin-Brandenburg (VBB)

History
- Opened: 26 October 2020; 5 years ago
Services
Preceding station	Berlin S-Bahn	Following station
Schönefeld (bei Berlin) towards Südkreuz	S45	BER Airport Terminus
Schönefeld (bei Berlin) towards Spandau	S9	BER Airport Terminus
Location

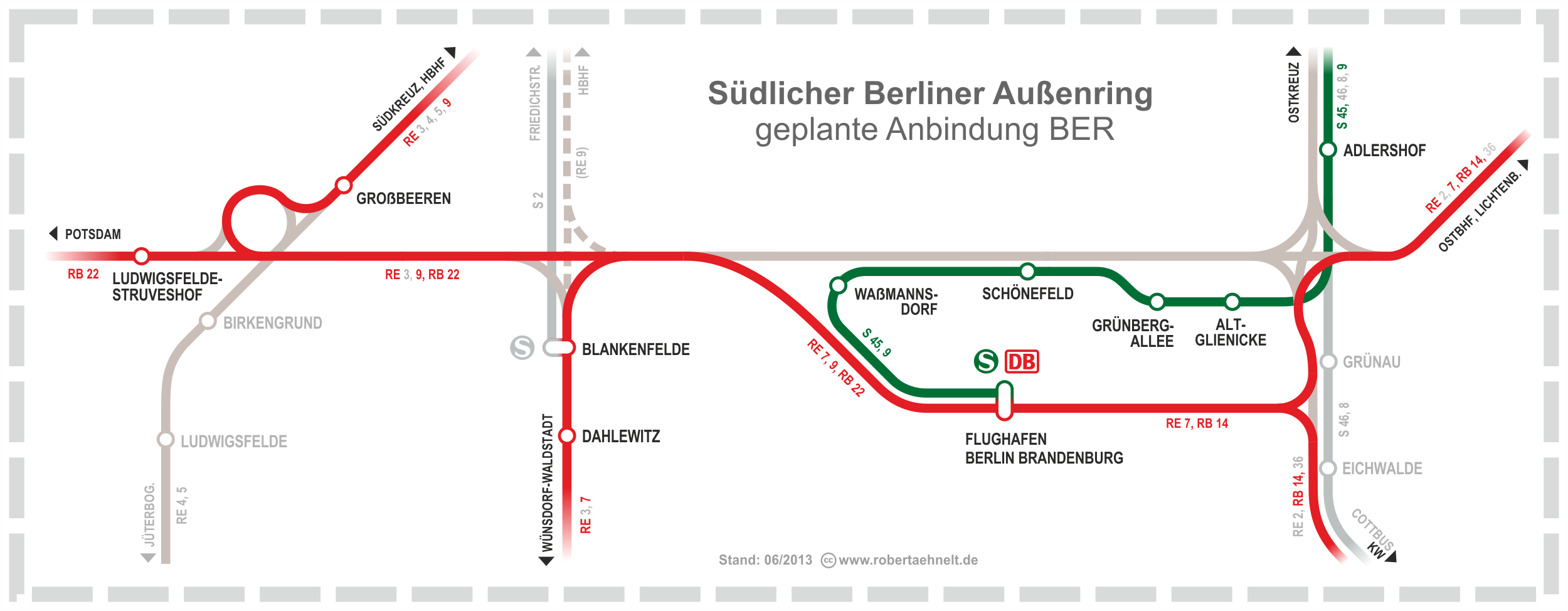
Map showing the new connections in the area (Waßmannsdorf is shown in the middle)

The Waßmannsdorf station is a stop of the Berlin S-Bahn in Waßmannsdorf in the municipality of Schönefeld on the Grünau Cross–Berlin Brandenburg Airport railway. It was completed in October 2011 and opened on 26 October 2020, five days before Berlin Brandenburg Airport (BER) opened on 31 October 2020. A railway station already existed in the village from 1951 to 1982. It was not located at the same place and was exclusively a depot (Betriebsbahnhof) on the Berlin outer ring.

== Location ==
The station is located about 800 m (2,600 ft) southwest of the center of Waßmannsdorf. The former Berlin Schönefeld Airport (SXF) is about four kilometres (2.5 mi) away, the new Flughafen Berlin Brandenburg (BER) about one and a half kilometres (0.93 mi). The station is located between the village and the Bundesstraße 96a. It belongs to the Berlin C tariff zone of the Verkehrsverbund Berlin-Brandenburg (VBB).

== Old station ==
On 10 July 1951 a station called Waßmannsdorf was already opened on the Berlin outer ring. It was located about four kilometres (2.5 mi) west of Schönefeld Airport and was on a railroad embankment west of the Dorfstraße. It served only operational purposes and was not open for passenger traffic. The plans from 1951 initially provided for four platforms and three freight tracks. In 1958, an 840 m (2,760 ft) long, northbound passing track was added to the two continuous main tracks. In the course of the three- and four-track expansion of the Berlin outer ring, the site was abandoned on 7 May 1982.

== New stop ==
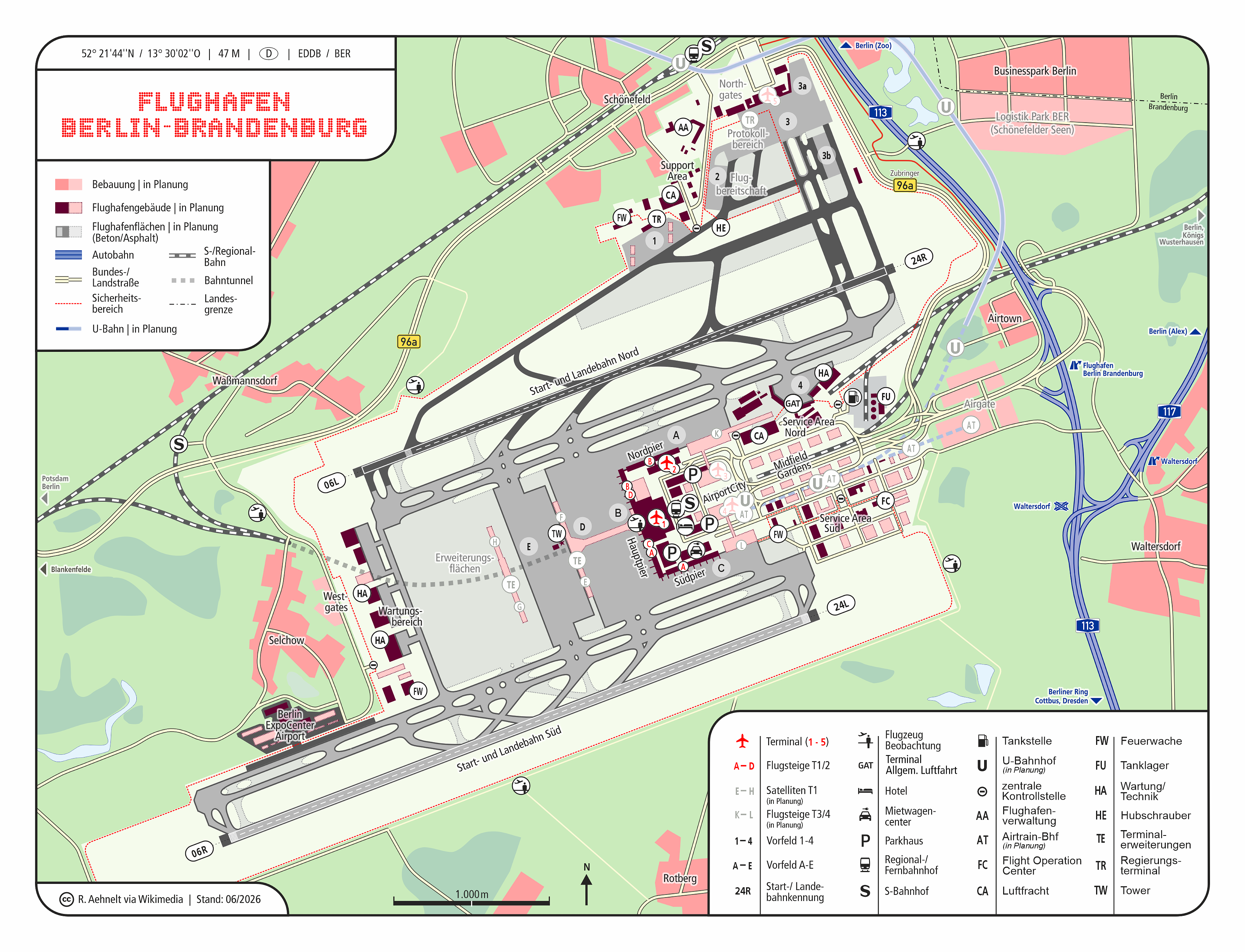
Location of Waßmannsdorf station northwest of Berlin Brandenburg Airport (BER)

The new stop was completed on 30 October 2011. Officially, the station has been in existence since 17 June 2011 and is located on the route from Grünauer Kreuz to Berlin Brandenburg Airport. The cost of this project amounted to about seven million euros (as of January 2014), which was financed by the municipality of Schönefeld itself. After the opening of the new airport (BER) was initially delayed even further, 3 June 2012 was set as the opening date for the airport and the stop, which could not be met. The stop in Waßmannsdorf was opened when the airport started operating in 2020.

From the municipality of Schönefeld the wish arose that the S-Bahn Berlin would serve Waßmannsdorf even before the opening of the BER. The S-Bahn Berlin GmbH examined different possibilities, whereby a shuttle train service was considered. On 17 June 2011 Deutsche Bahn announced that it would have trains stop in Waßmannsdorf in 2012. Trains regularly passed through to ventilate the tunnel station of the BER.

== Installations ==
The station is located on a dam in otherwise open fields, south of the village of Waßmannsdorf. There is no direct road connection to the village, because the tracks of the Berlin outer ring lie to the west. Therefore, the only road connection to the station is from the east. The station has two outer platforms, each of which can be reached from the surrounding area via an access structure with stairs and elevators.

The section between Waßmannsdorf and the airport railway station is connected via an electronic interlocking in Selchow, with train handling being controlled by a remote monitoring system from BER Airport station. In the event of a camera failure, trains cannot stop at Waßmannsdorf in the direction of BER Terminal 1-2 without local supervision, because the narrow curve does not allow self-handling by the train driver.

In the direction of Schönefeld (bei Berlin) (the old Schönefeld station) the driver can handle the train alone, because the platform is located on the inside of the track curve.

Park and ride facilities, and a bus stop, are provided at the forecourt.

== ILA ==
After the ILA Berlin Air Show 2012 had to relocate to the southwest side of the future Berlin Brandenburg Airport, it was initially planned that a large part of the visitor traffic on the public days would be handled by the Waßmannsdorf station, which is located near the new exhibition grounds. However, the Federal Police prohibited its use shortly before the exhibition began, because the station was too small for the expected stream of visitors. There was particular criticism that the platforms were too narrow and that there was only one elevator and one staircase per platform. When planning the station, possible visitor traffic for the ILA had not been taken into account. The station was financed exclusively by the municipality of Schönefeld and was designed only to meet its needs, i.e. the site itself, a future industrial estate and airport employees. Messe Berlin had convinced the Bundesverband der Deutschen Luft- und Raumfahrtindustrie (BDLI) to continue the ILA in Schönefeld, partly because of the favourable transport links via the S-Bahn, but did not get involved in the planning of the station. A provisional extension of the station would have cost €400,000, which nobody wanted to raise. In addition, the operational management would have been complicated: Since there are no turnouts in Waßmannsdorf, the trains from Waßmannsdorf would have had to travel empty to BER airport and back from there. Public transport for the ILA 2012 and also 2014 was therefore only possible with shuttle buses and cabs.

== Gallery ==
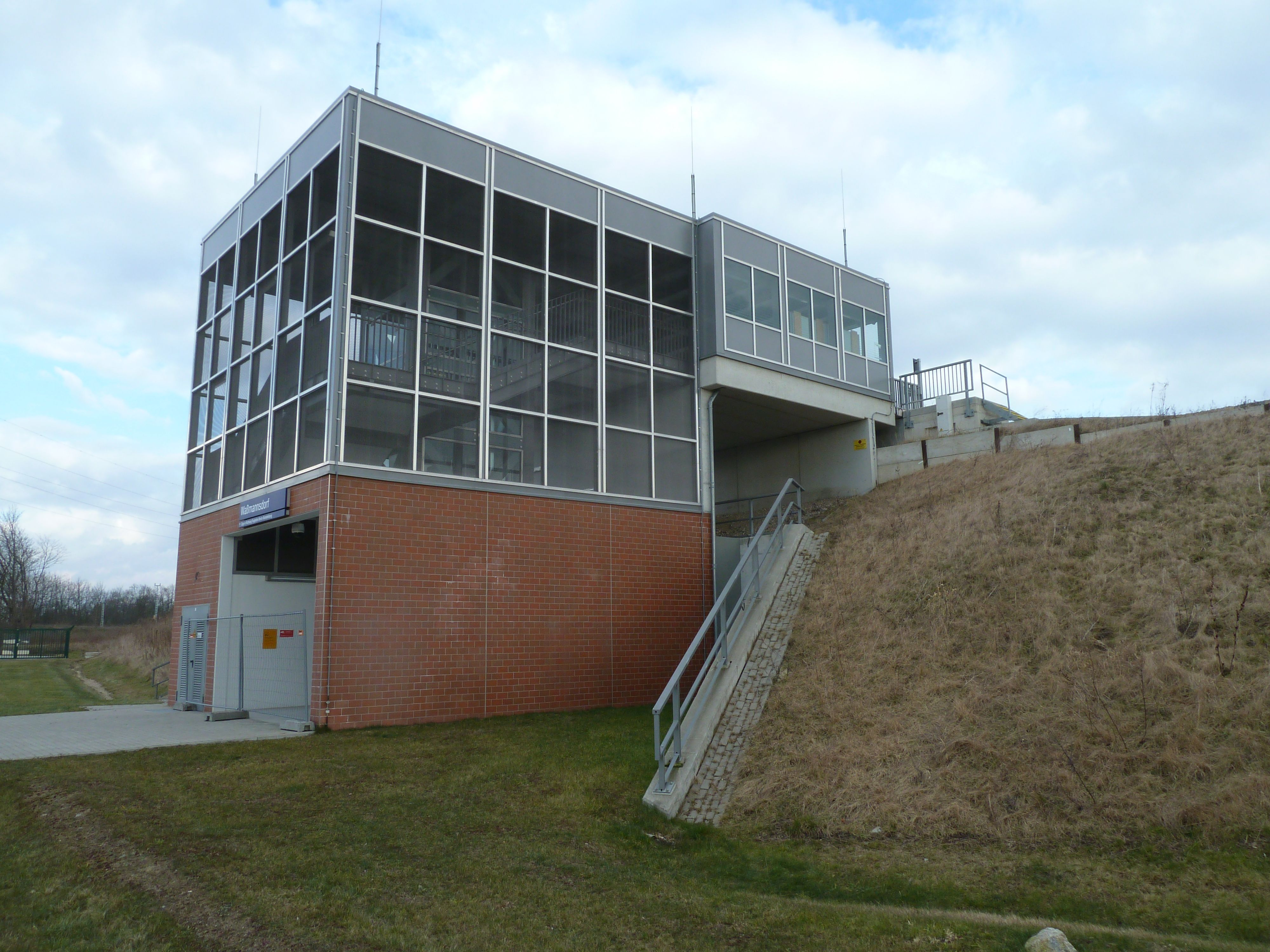
Western access building

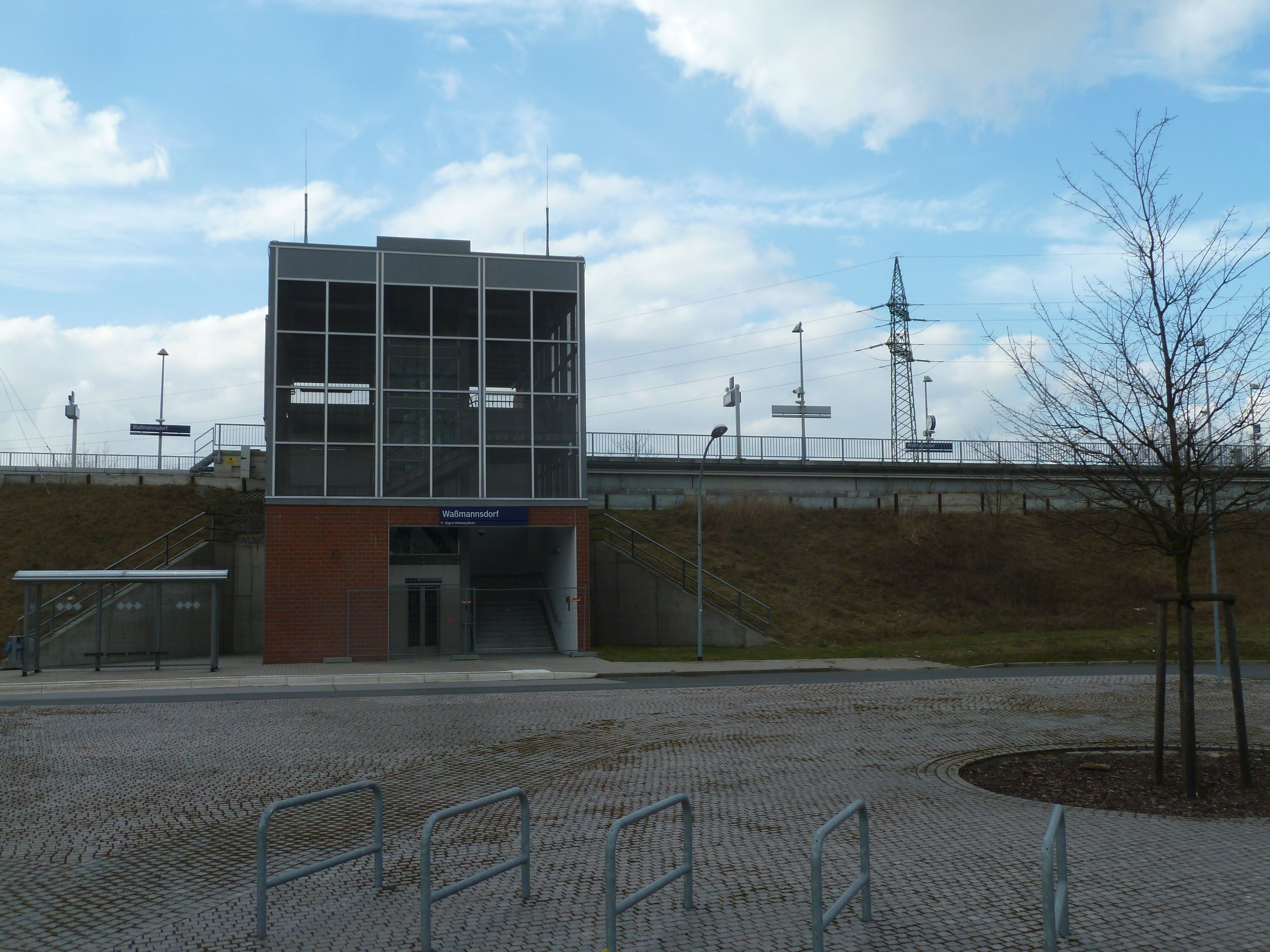
Eastern access building

== See also ==
- List of railway stations in the Berlin area
