= Bremenfly =

German charter airline

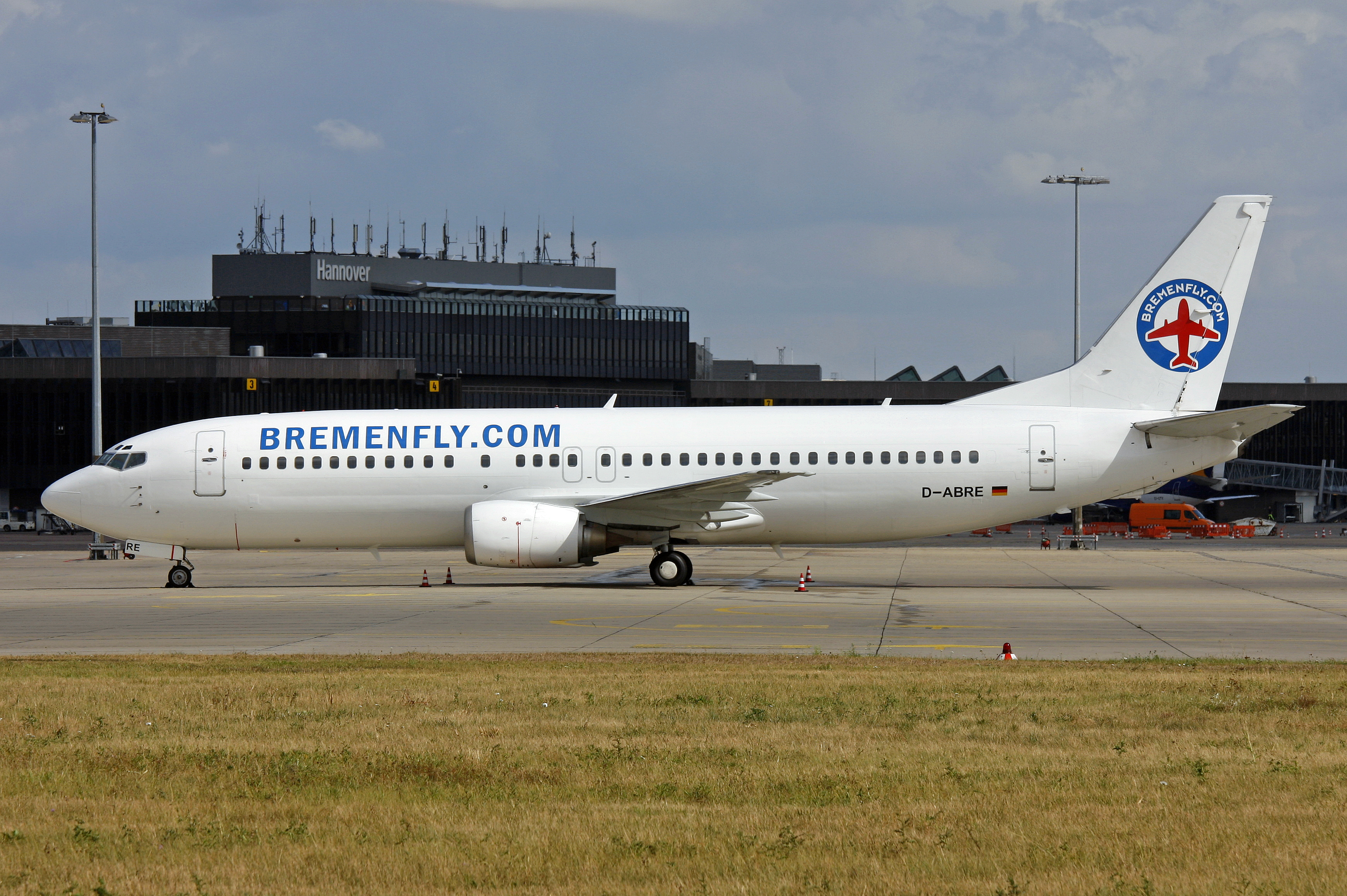
- Boeing 737-400
IATA	ICAO	Call sign
8B	BFY	BORGWARDT
- Founded: 2008
- Commenced operations: May 20, 2009
- Ceased operations: February 201011
- Operating bases: Berlin Schönefeld Airport
- Fleet size: 2 (at closure)
- Headquarters: Schönefeld, Germany
- Website: bremenfly.com

Bremenfly GmbH was a German charter airline based at Berlin Schönefeld Airport.

== History ==
The company was funded by Jordanian KH Group,, owners of both Alexandria Airlines and Jordan Aviation. Bremenfly was founded in 2008, received its AOC on 15 April 2009 and started operations on 20 May of the same year, originally from Bremen Airport. Bremenfly thus initially offered charter flights to Beirut and Amman out of several German airports.

In 2010 the Bremenfly headquarters were moved from Bremen to Berlin. On 3 November 2010, the airline returned its operating licence. Due to financial constraints, plans for a relaunch of operations could not be realized.

== Destinations ==
As of July 2010, Bremenfly operated charter flights from Berlin Schönefeld Airport, Düsseldorf Airport and Munich Airport to destinations in Turkey and Israel.

== Fleet ==
The Bremenfly fleet consisted of two Boeing 737-400 aircraft, which were equipped with 168 passenger seats in an all-economy class cabin layout.
