= Bundesautobahn 117 =

Federal motorway in Germany

Coordinates: 52°23′03″N 13°33′48″E

A 117
- Bundesautobahn 117

Route information
- Length: 4.8 km (3.0 mi)
- Existed: 23 May 2008–present

Major junctions
- North end: Altglienicke (Treptow-Köpenick, Berlin)
- South end: Waltersdorf (Schönefeld, Brandenburg)

Location
- Country: Germany
- States: Berlin, Brandenburg

Highway system
- Roads in Germany; Autobahns; List; Federal; List; State; E-roads
← A 115	→ A 143

Bundesautobahn 117 (translates from German as Federal Motorway 117, short form Autobahn 117, abbreviated as BAB 117 or A 117) is an autobahn in Germany. The road that would become the A 117 was opened on 6 October 1962 as the A 113, intended as a connection from the A 10-A 13 junction in Schönefeld to the Berlin neighborhood of Adlershof. This road's path was similar to all of the A 117's present-day route, then the A 113's route south to the beginning of the A 13.

Soon after reunification, a junction was built along the A 113 at Waltersdorf (present-day A 117 junction 2). In 1997, construction began in Neukölln on a new section of autobahn, which was to begin at the A 100 and connect the inner city to Adlershof and the already-existing section of the A 113. The new section was completed in 2008 and received the A 113 designation. The stub that was left, from Waltersdorf into Treptow, was renumbered A 117.

During construction of the A 113 extension, a new three-way interchange had to be built at the point where the extension meets the existing roadway. The existing autobahn also had to be slightly rerouted, as the town's cemetery was isolated from the rest of its area by the road. The only way to resolve this problem and retain both the new junction and the existing junction was to combine the two junctions, although to this day they are still numbered separately.

When the A 113-A 117 project was completed, the portion of the B 179 that ran into Berlin was downgraded to L 400, a fact that still has not been noted by most maps.

== Exit list ==
Intersection	(1)	Treptow B 96a
		Bahnbrücke 50 m
		Hubertus (under construction)
		Tankstelle Waldeck
	(2)	Waltersdorf
	(3)	Waltersdorfer Dreieck A 113
