= Glasow (Blankenfelde-Mahlow) =

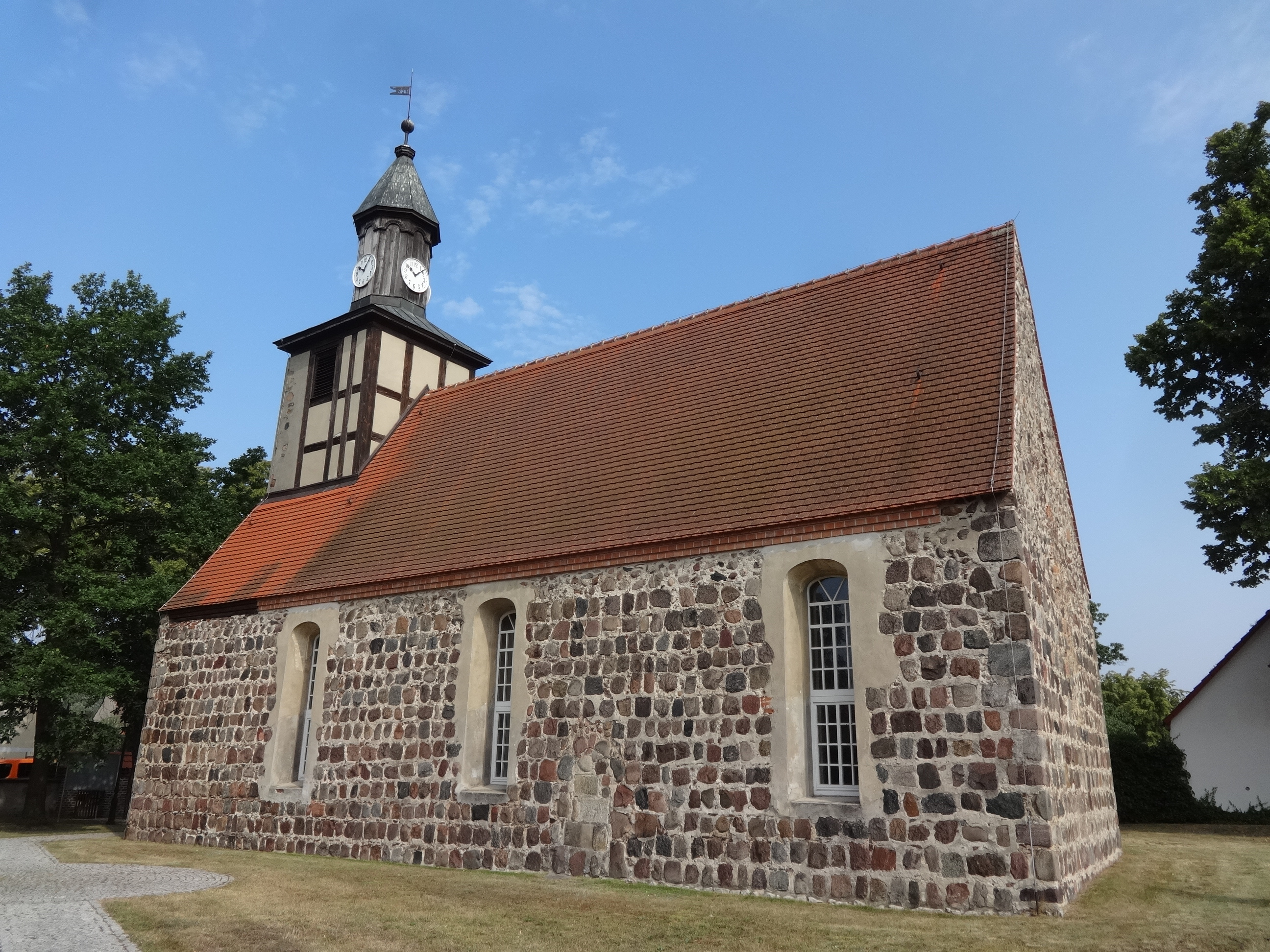
- Glasow village church
- Interactive map of Glasow
- Coordinates: 52°20′42″N 13°26′07″E

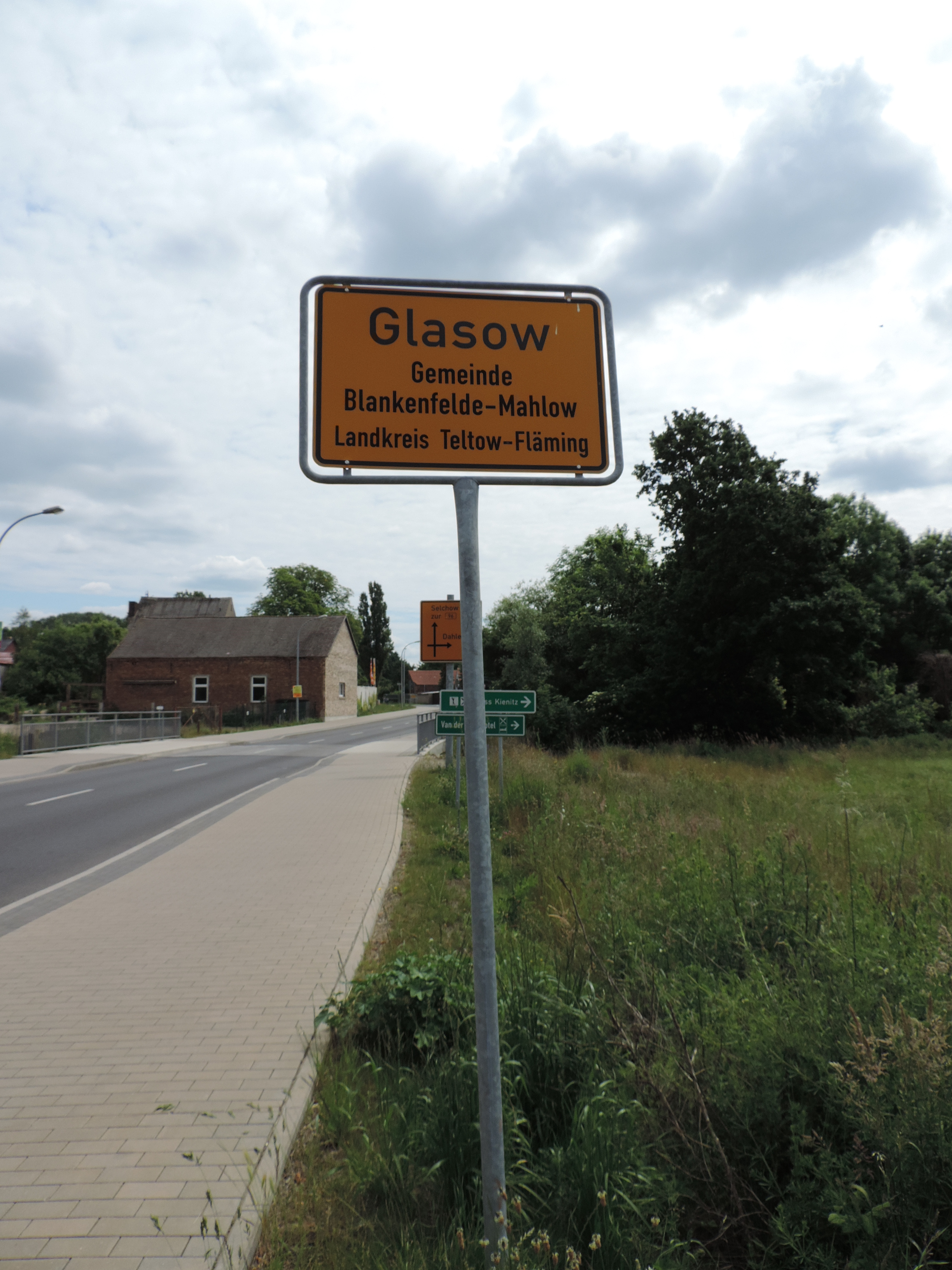
Glasow area sign

Glasow is an inhabited part of the Mahlow district of the municipality of Blankenfelde-Mahlow in the district of Teltow-Fläming in the state of Brandenburg, Germany. It is on the Bundesautobahn 49.
