= Waßmannsdorf =

- Ortsteil of Schönefeld
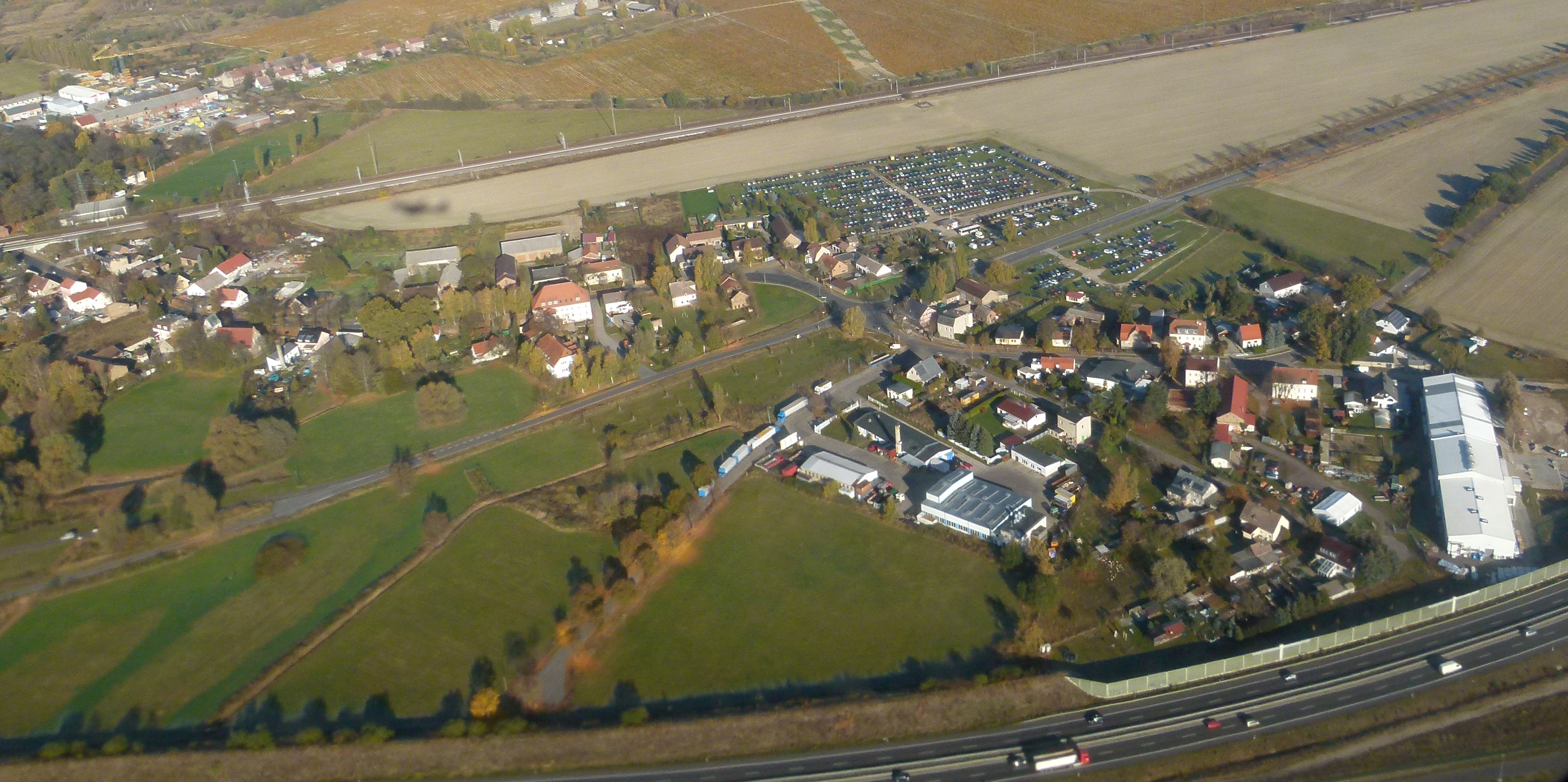
- Aerial view

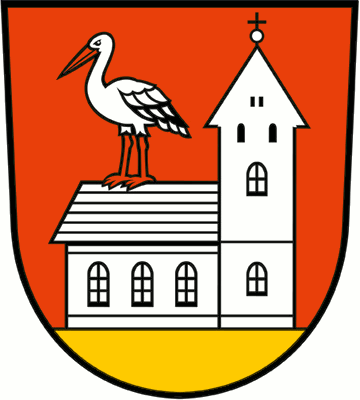
- Coat of arms
- Interactive map of Waßmannsdorf
- Location within Germany Location within Brandenburg
- Coordinates: 52°22′18″N 13°28′29″E
- Country: Germany
- State: Brandenburg
- District: Dahme-Spreewald
- Municipality: Schönefeld

Area
  - Total: 7.84 km^{2} (3.03 sq mi)
- Elevation: 40 m (130 ft)

Population (2015)
  - Total: 784
  - Density: 100/km^{2} (259/sq mi)
- Time zone: UTC+01:00 (CET)
  - Summer (DST): UTC+02:00 (CEST)
- Postal codes: 12529
- Dialling codes: 03379
- Vehicle registration: LDS

Waßmannsdorf is a village and a civil parish (Ortsteil) of the German town of Schönefeld, located in the district of Dahme-Spreewald in Brandenburg. As of 2007 its population was of around 1,000.

== History ==
First mentioned in 1350 as Wasmanstorp, the village was an autonomous municipality until 2003, when it merged into Schönefeld. From 1961 to 1989 its municipal borders with West Berlin were crossed by the Berlin Wall.

== Geography ==
Waßmannsdorf is located in the southeastern suburb of Berlin, near the districts of Tempelhof-Schöneberg, Neukölln and Treptow-Köpenick; and bordering with the quarter of Rudow. The nearest places are Großziethen, Selchow, Schönefeld and Blankenfelde-Mahlow. The village is 20 km far from Königs Wusterhausen, 28 from Ludwigsfelde and 34 from Potsdam.

== Transport ==
Waßmannsdorf is situated close to the runway of the new Berlin Brandenburg Airport. Crossed by the Berlin outer ring, it is served by a new railway station on the S-Bahn extension to the new airport (lines S45 and S9). The village is also interested by the Expressway Potsdam-Schönefeld projects.

== Gallery ==
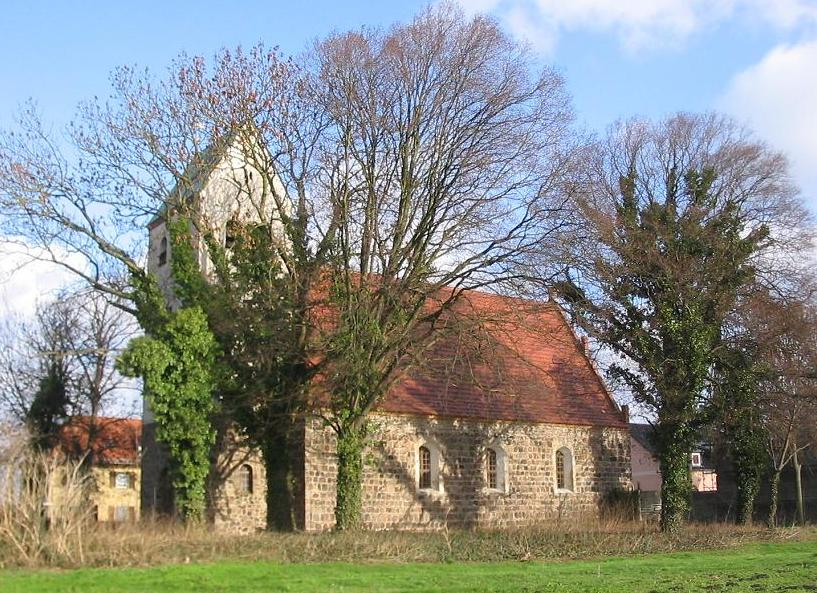
Village church

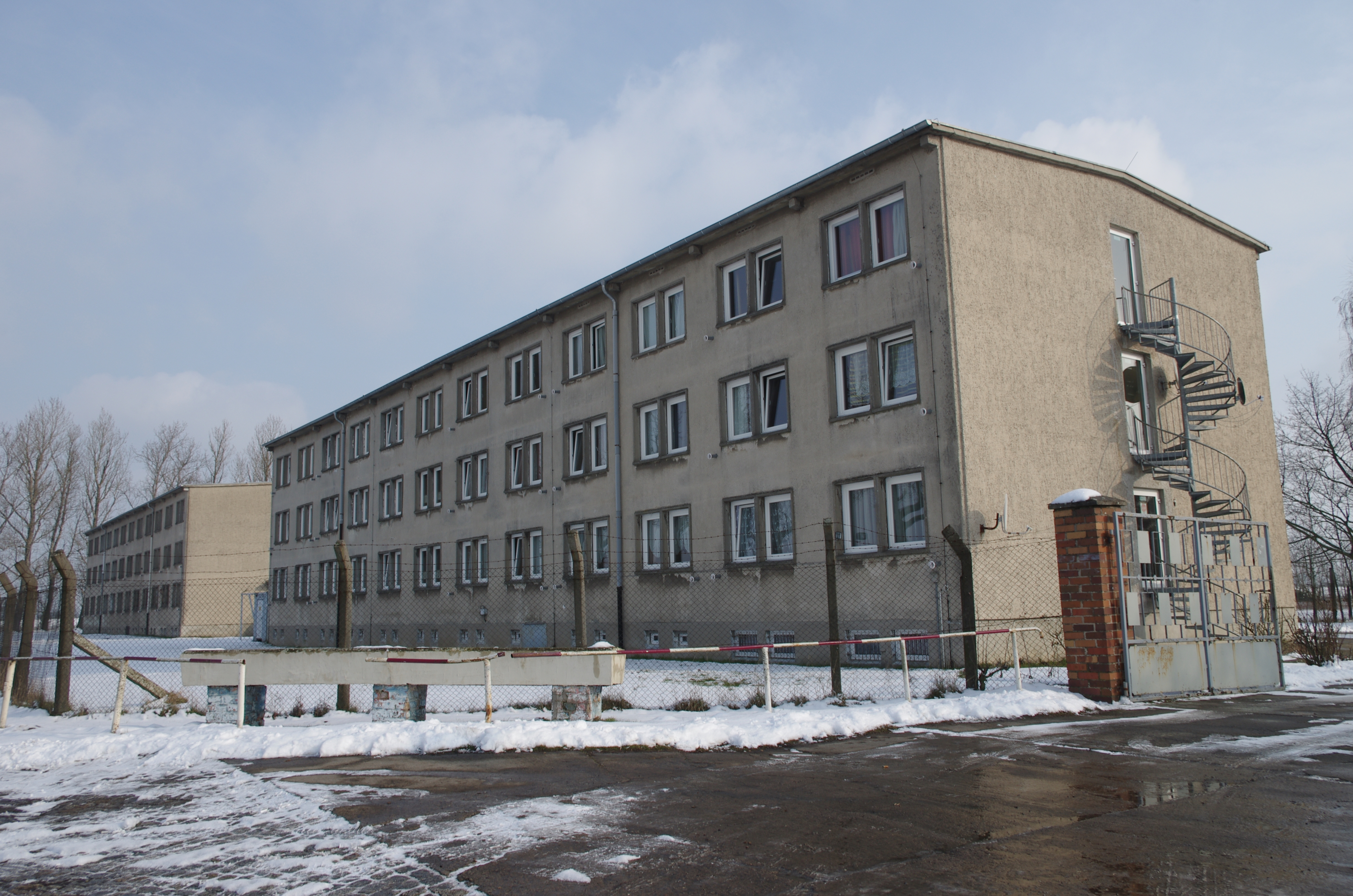
Former barracks
