= Schönefeld =

- Municipality
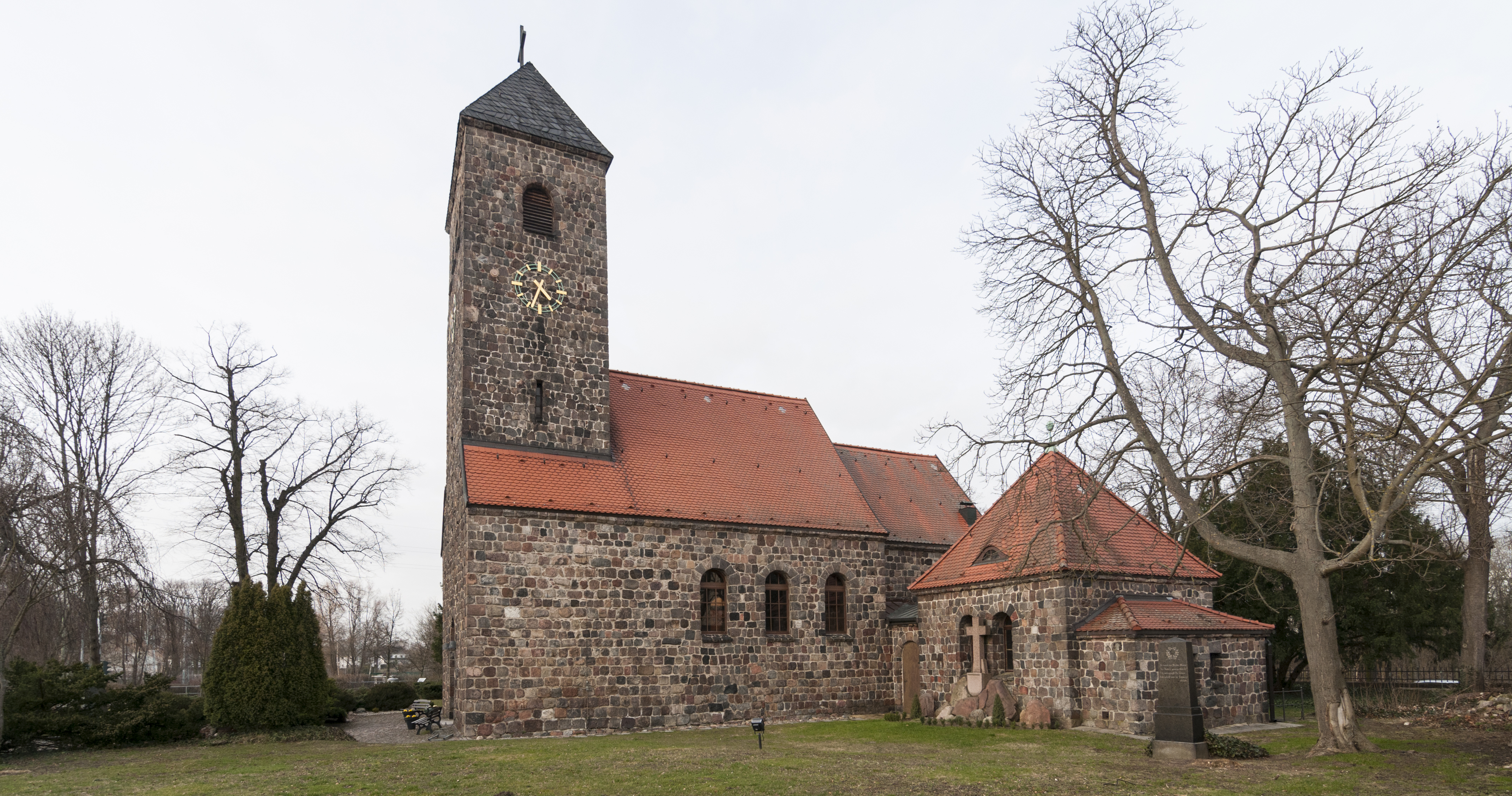
- Schönefeld village church

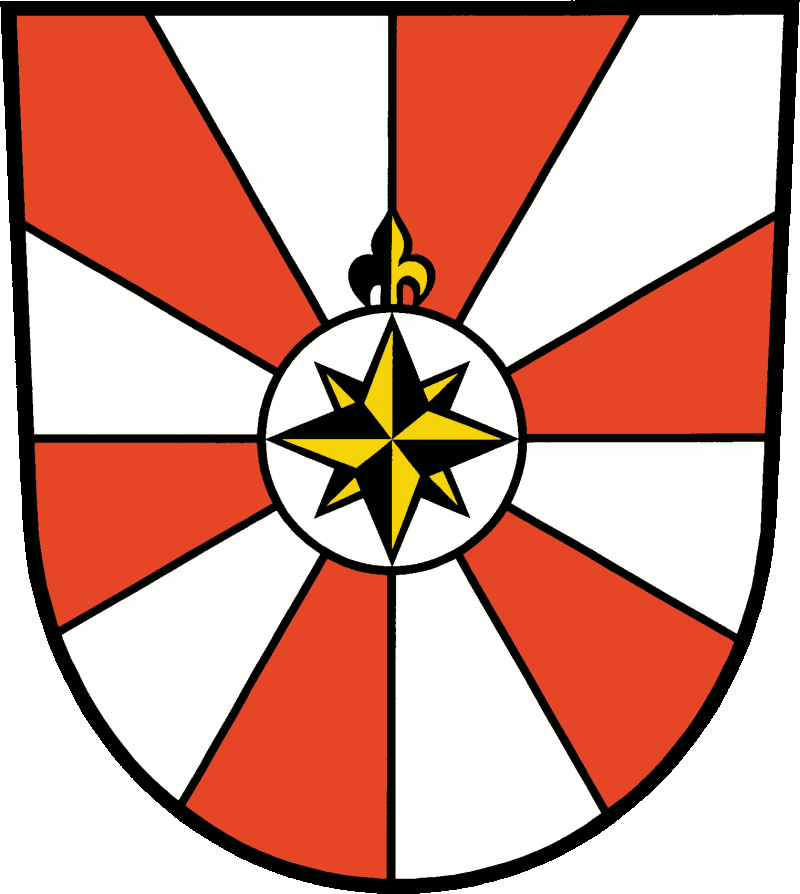
- Coat of arms

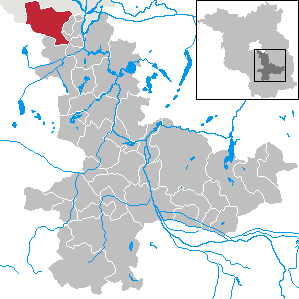
- Location of Schönefeld within Dahme-Spreewald district
- Interactive map of Schönefeld
- Location within Germany Location within Brandenburg
- Coordinates: 52°23′18″N 13°30′17″E
- Country: Germany
- State: Brandenburg
- District: Dahme-Spreewald
- Subdivisions: 6 Ortsteile

Government
  - Mayor (2019–27): Christian Hentschel

Area
  - Total: 81.62 km^{2} (31.51 sq mi)
- Elevation: 44 m (144 ft)

Population (2025-12-31)
  - Total: 19,351
  - Density: 237.1/km^{2} (614.1/sq mi)
- Time zone: UTC+01:00 (CET)
  - Summer (DST): UTC+02:00 (CEST)
- Postal codes: 12529
- Dialling codes: 030, 03379, 033762
- Vehicle registration: LDS
- Website: Official website

Schönefeld (German pronunciation: [ˈʃøːnəfɛlt], meaning beautiful field) is a suburban municipality in the Dahme-Spreewald district, Brandenburg, Germany. It borders the southeastern districts of Berlin. The municipal area encompasses the old Berlin Schönefeld Airport (SXF) and the new Berlin Brandenburg Airport (BER).

== Geography ==
It is located about 22 km (14 mi) southeast of the Berlin city centre, next to Berlin's only airport, Berlin Brandenburg Airport (BER).

In the north, Schönefeld adjoins to the Berlin boroughs of Tempelhof-Schöneberg, Neukölln, and Treptow-Köpenick with the localities of Lichtenrade, Gropiusstadt, Buckow, Rudow, Altglienicke, and Bohnsdorf. In the south, it borders Mittenwalde, in the west, Blankenfelde-Mahlow and in the east, Schulzendorf and Zeuthen.

=== Civil parishes ===
The Schönefeld municipal area comprises six districts (Ortsteile), former municipalities in their own right which were incorporated in 2003:

- Schönefeld proper
- Großziethen
- Selchow
- Kiekebusch
- Waltersdorf
- Waßmannsdorf

The settlement of Kienberg, part of Waltersdorf, was cleared of residents to permit expansion of the Berlin Brandenburg Airport and is to be developed as a commercial area.

== History and monuments ==
The first preserved mention of Schönefeld in the Mittelmark territory dates back to 1242. Sconenfelde, then a possession held by the Lords of Selchow, is documented in the 1375 Landbuch (domesday book) of Emperor Charles IV, when he also ruled as Elector of Brandenburg. The village church, rebuilt in 1904/05 according to plans designed by Franz Heinrich Schwechten, includes a large Baroque altar. Waltersdorf and Waßmannsdorf also have village churches dating to the first half of the 13th century.

From 1933 onwards, the Henschel aircraft company moved from Johannisthal Air Field to Schönefeld and had three runways laid out next to the village. More than 14,000 warplanes were built at the site until 1945, when the premises were occupied by the Red Army. In the Großziethen cemetery is a memorial to 200 prisoners of war and forced laborers who died during World War II. The Soviet Air Forces used the air field from 1946, one year later the Soviet Military Administration ordered the buildup of a civil air service supplying East Berlin.

Before German reunification, Schönefeld shared its borders partly with boroughs of former West Berlin (present-day Neukölln and Tempelhof-Schöneberg), and so from 1961 to 1990 it was separated from it by the Berlin Wall.

== Demography ==
Development of the population since 1875 within the current boundaries (blue line: population; dotted line: comparison to the population development of Brandenburg; grey background: time of Nazi rule; red background: time of communist rule)

Recent population development and projections (population development before the 2011 census (blue line); recent population development according to the census in Germany in 2011 (blue bordered line); official projections for 2005–2030 (yellow line); for 2020–2030 (green line); for 2017–2030 (scarlet line)

Schönefeld: Population development
within the current boundaries (2017)

Year	Pop.	±% p.a.
1875	2,903	—
1890	3,415	+1.09%
1910	3,613	+0.28%
1925	3,918	+0.54%
1933	4,278	+1.10%
1939	5,811	+5.24%
1946	6,397	+1.38%
1950	6,446	+0.19%
1964	6,117	−0.37%
1971	5,605	−1.24%
1981	6,068	+0.80%
1985	5,857	−0.88%
1989	5,449	−1.79%
1990	5,312	−2.51%
1991	5,128	−3.46%

Year	Pop.	±% p.a.
1992	5,450	+6.28%
1993	6,023	+10.51%
1994	6,456	+7.19%
1995	7,619	+18.01%
1996	8,772	+15.13%
1997	9,752	+11.17%
1998	10,496	+7.63%
1999	11,059	+5.36%
2000	11,218	+1.44%
2001	11,405	+1.67%
2002	11,667	+2.30%
2003	11,843	+1.51%
2004	11,993	+1.27%
2005	12,274	+2.34%
2006	12,354	+0.65%

Year	Pop.	±% p.a.
2007	12,462	+0.87%
2008	12,831	+2.96%
2009	13,060	+1.78%
2010	13,256	+1.50%
2011	13,317	+0.46%
2012	13,453	+1.02%
2013	13,760	+2.28%
2014	13,895	+0.98%
2015	14,190	+2.12%
2016	14,423	+1.64%
2017	14,625	+1.40%
2018	15,472	+5.79%
2019	16,270	+5.16%
2020	17,017	+4.59%
2022	18,461	+4.16%

== Economy and infrastructure ==
=== Transport ===
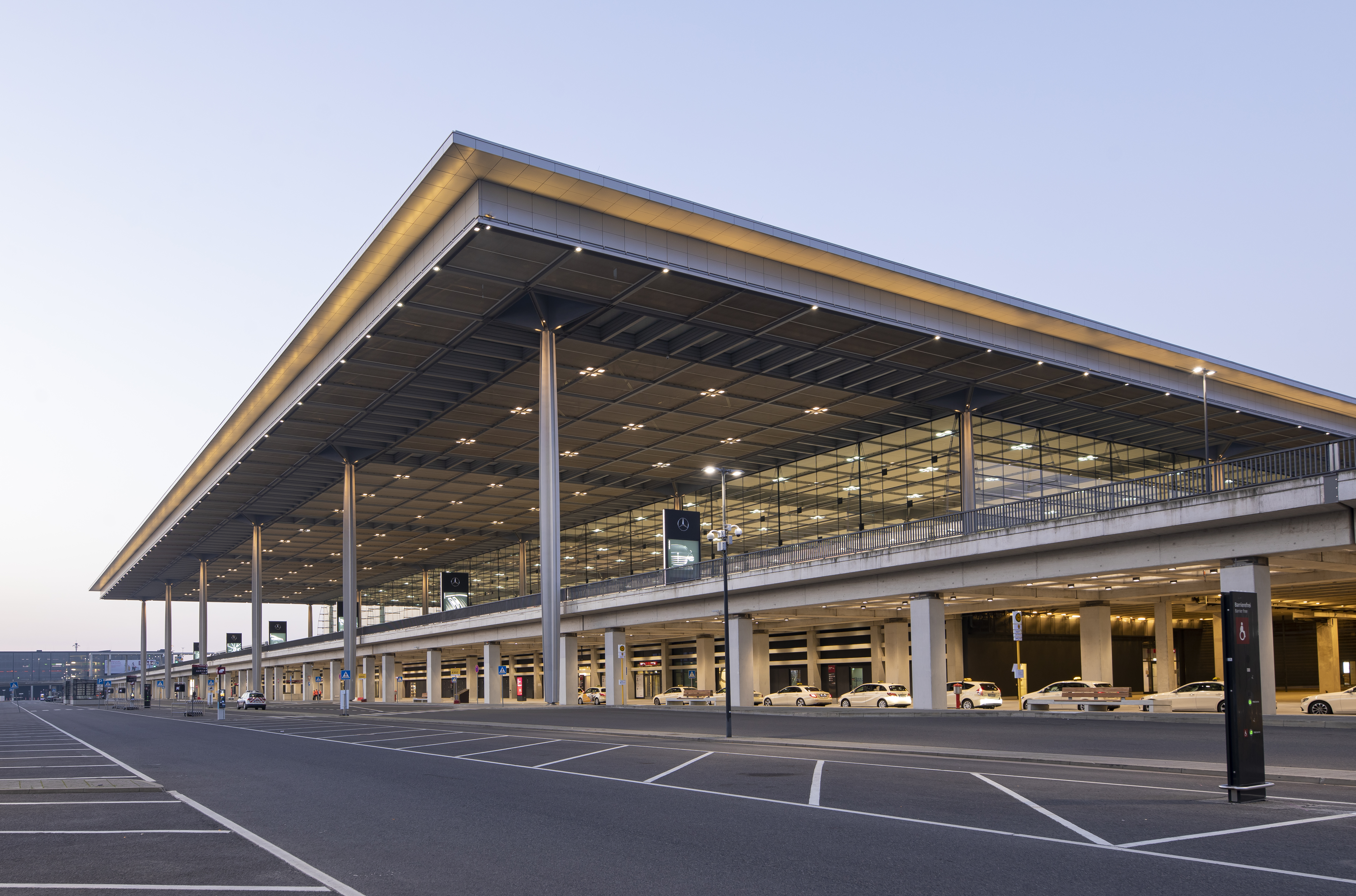
Berlin Brandenburg Airport

- Berlin Brandenburg Airport
- Schönefeld (bei Berlin) station, opened in 1951 on the Berlin outer ring, is currently served by the Berlin S-Bahn lines S45 and S9
- Berlin Brandenburg Airport railway station beneath the airport Terminal 1 served by S-Bahn, Regional Express trains, "Airport Express" (FEX) and long distance IC trains
- Waßmannsdorf station, between the airport station and the Schönefeld station served only by the S-Bahn
- There are plans to extend the U7 line to Schönefeld
- The Schönefeld interchange connects the autobahns A13, A113 with its A117 branch-off, and A10 (Berliner Ring).
- Bundesstraßen B96A and B179

=== Business ===
The Airport-Center, an industrial area in Waltersdorf, and Berlin Brandenburg Airport are important sources of revenue for Schönefeld.

The head office of Private Wings is located in the General Aviation Terminal (Allgemeine Luftfahrt) on the property of Schönefeld Airport. Before its disestablishment, the East German airline company Interflug had its head office on the grounds of the airport. Bremenfly also had its head office in Schönefeld.

== Politics ==
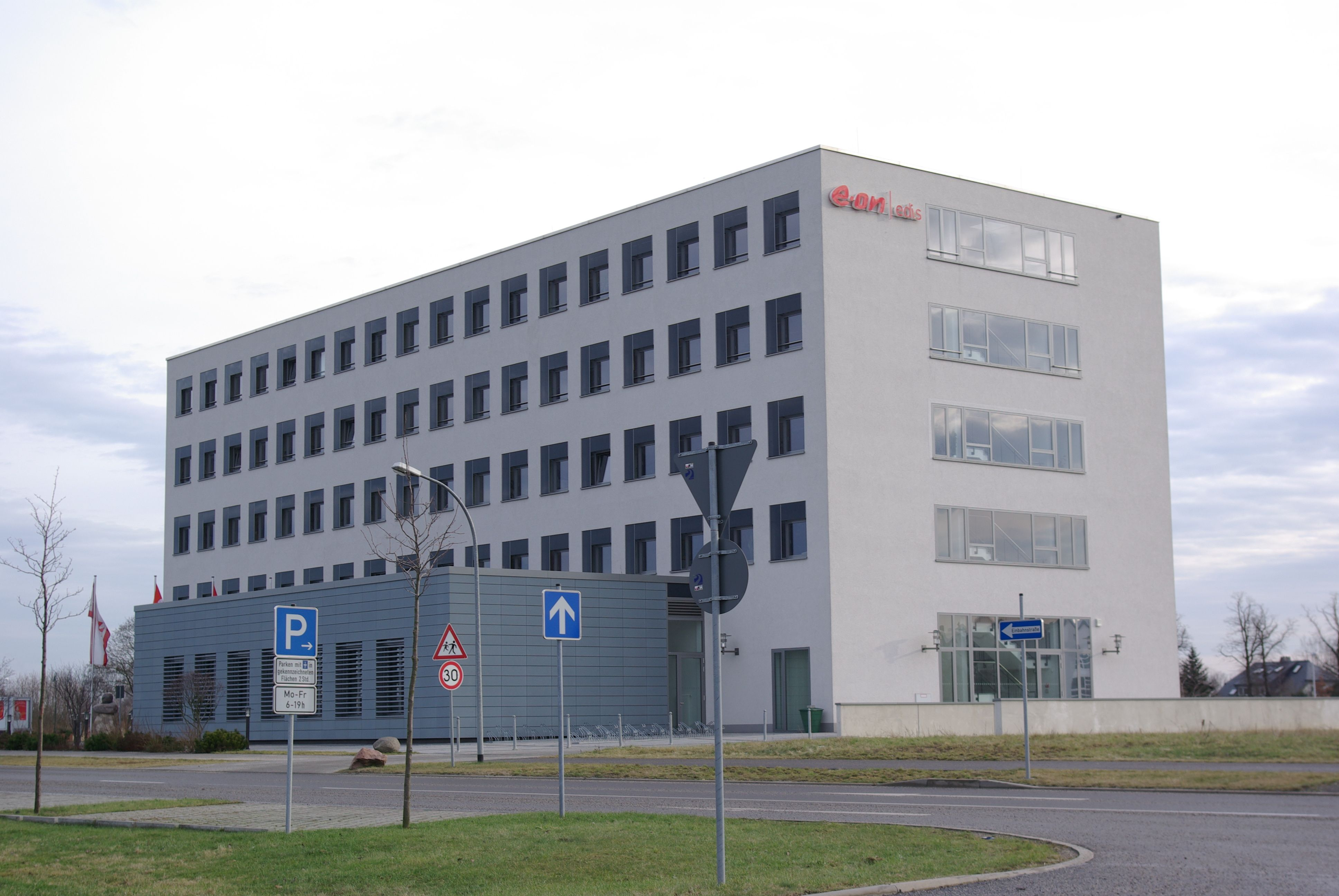
Town hall

Seats in the municipal council (Gemeinderat):

- Alle für Eine voters' association: 5
- Christian Democratic Union (CDU): 7
- Social Democratic Party of Germany (SPD): 3
- The Left: 2
- Schönefeld citizens' initiative (BIS): 1
- Pro Schönefeld citizens' association: 4

=== Twin towns — Sister cities ===
Schönefeld is twinned with (Mongolia) Bayangol, a district of Ulaanbaatar, since 1999.

== Education ==
Primary schools in the municipality:

- Astrid-Lindgren-Grundschule Schönefeld
- Paul-Maar-Grundschule Großziethen

There is a private secondary school, Evangelische Schule Schönefeld.

== Notable people ==
- Rosemarie Clausen, theatrical photographer, born in Großziethen in 1907
- Rudi Dutschke, prominent spokesperson of the German student movement of the 1960s

== See also ==
- Berlin-Schönefeld Airport
- Schönefeld (bei Berlin) station
- Berlin Brandenburg Airport
- BER Airport station

== Sources ==
- Bernd Kuhlmann. Schönefeld bei Berlin – 1 Amt, 1 Flughafen und 11 Bahnhöfe. Berlin: Gesellschaft für Verkehrspolitik und Eisenbahnwesen, 1996. ISBN 3-89218-038-5 (in German)
