= Brandenburg (disambiguation) =

Brandenburg is one of Germany's sixteen Bundesländer (federal states).

Brandenburg may also refer to:

== Places ==
- Brandenburg an der Havel, a town in Brandenburg, Germany
- Brandenburg Euthanasia Centre, a Nazi killing facility located in the aforementioned town
- Brandenburg-Görden Prison, a prison located nearby the aforementioned town
- Margraviate of Brandenburg, a medieval German principality (1157–1806), with spinoffs
  - Principality of Ansbach or margraviate of Brandenburg-Ansbach (1398–1791)
  - Principality of Bayreuth or margraviate of Brandenburg-Kulmbach (1398–1791)
  - Margraviate of Brandenburg-Küstrin (1535–1571)
  - Brandenburg-Schwedt, a dependency of Brandenburg (1689–1788)
- Brandenburg-Prussia (1618–1701), a historical state consisting of the Margraviate of Brandenburg and the Duchy of Prussia
- Province of Brandenburg (1815–1947), a province of Prussia, Germany
- Brandenburg (1945–1952), a subdivision of the Soviet occupation zone and state of East Germany
- Neubrandenburg (New Brandenburg), a town in Mecklenburg-Western Pomerania, Germany
- Brandenburg, Kentucky, a city in the United States
- Brandenburg (Frisches Haff), former name of Ushakovo in Kaliningrad Oblast, Russia

== Transportation ==
- Brandenburg-class battleship, a class of battleships built by Germany in the 1890s
  - SMS Brandenburg, the lead ship of the class
- Brandenburg-class frigate, a class of frigates operated by the German Navy
  - German frigate Brandenburg (F215), the lead ship of the class
- USS Brandenburg (1901)
- Berlin Brandenburg Airport (BER/EDDB)

== Other uses ==
- Brandenburg (ballet), a 1997 ballet by Jerome Robbins
- Brandenburg (surname)
- Brandenburg concertos, a collection of instrumental works by Johann Sebastian Bach
- Brandenburg v. Ohio, a United States Supreme Court case
- Brandenburg, a 2005 book by journalist Henry Porter
- Brandenburg, a 1994 novel by Glenn Meade
- Brandenburgers, a German commando unit during World War II

== See also ==
- Brandenburg Gate (disambiguation)
- List of rulers of Brandenburg
- List of places in Brandenburg
- Berlin-Brandenburg (disambiguation)
- Brandenbourg, a village in Luxembourg
