= Flughafen Berlin Brandenburg =

Flughafen Berlin Brandenburg may refer to

- Berlin Brandenburg Airport (BER, an airport opened in October 2020)
- Flughafen Berlin Brandenburg GmbH, the owner and operator of this airport

== See also ==
- Berlin-Brandenburg (disambiguation)
