= Berlin-Brandenburg (disambiguation) =

Berlin-Brandenburg (Berlin/Brandenburg Metropolitan Region) is one of eleven metropolitan regions of Germany.

Berlin-Brandenburg may also refer to:

== Transportation ==
- Berlin Brandenburg Airport (BER/EDDB), Berlin, Germany
  - Berlin Brandenburg Airport railway station (disambiguation)
- Flughafen Berlin Brandenburg GmbH (FBB), Berlin-Brandenburg Airports; airport authority of Berlin, Germany
- Verkehrsverbund Berlin-Brandenburg (VBB), Berlin-Brandenburg Transport; public transit authority of the state of Berlin and state of Brandenburg in Germany

== Organisations ==
- Rundfunk Berlin-Brandenburg (rbb), Berlin-Brandenburg Broadcasting
- Berlin Brandenburg International School, Potsdam, Germany
- Berlin-Brandenburg Academy of Sciences and Humanities
  - Berlin-Brandenburg Academy Award

== Sport ==
- Berlin Brandenburg Trophy, of horseracing
- Verbandsliga Berlin-Brandenburg, the Berlin-Brandeburg league
  - Gauliga Berlin-Brandenburg (1933–1945), a soccer league
  - Oberliga Berlin-Brandenburg (1923–1933), a soccer league

== See also ==
- Brandenburg Gate, in Berlin, Germany
- Flughafen Berlin Brandenburg (disambiguation)
- Berlin (disambiguation)
- Brandenburg (disambiguation)
- Fusion of Berlin and Brandenburg
