= Brandenburg (surname) =

Brandenburg is a surname. Notable people with the surname include:

- Alain Erlande-Brandenburg (1937–2020), French art historian and specialist on Gothic and Romanesque art
- Bryan Brandenburg (born 1959), American writer and video game designer
- Chet Brandenburg (1897–1974), American actor
- Daan Brandenburg (born 1987), Dutch chess grandmaster
- Ed Brandenburg (1893–1968), American actor
- Erich Brandenburg (1868–1946), German historian
- Hubertus Brandenburg (1923–2009), German-born Swedish Roman Catholic bishop
- Jacob Brandenburg (1899–1981), Polish-born Israeli sculptor
- Jens Brandenburg (born 1986), German politician
- Jim Brandenburg (basketball) (1935–2023), American college basketball coach
- Jim Brandenburg (photographer) (1945–2025), American environmentalist and wildlife photographer
- Johannes Brandenburg (1910–1942), German Luftwaffe pilot
- John N. Brandenburg (1929–2020), United States Army General
- Karlheinz Brandenburg (born 1954), German audio engineer and inventor
- Mario Brandenburg (born 1983), German politician
- Mark Brandenburg (baseball) (born 1970), American baseball pitcher
- Mark Brandenburg (politician) (born 1955), American politician
- Otto Brandenburg (1934–2007), Danish musician, singer, actor and film score composer
- Rick Brandenburg (born 1955), American entomologist
- William H. Brandenburg, United States Army Major General
