= Brandenburg Gate (disambiguation) =

Brandenburg Gate is a world-famous gate on the Pariser Platz in Berlin, Germany.

Brandenburg Gate may also refer to:

- Brandenburg Gate (Kaliningrad), a gate on Bagration street in Kaliningrad, Russia (formerly known as Königsberg)
- Brandenburg Gate (Potsdam), a gate on the Brandenburger Straße in Potsdam, Germany
- "Brandenburg Gate", the third episode of The Motorola Television Hour, a 1953 US drama anthology television series
- "Brandenburg Gate", a composition by the Dave Brubeck Quartet from the 1958 album Jazz Impressions of Eurasia
- Brandenburg Gate: Revisited, a 1963 album by the Dave Brubeck Quartet
- "Brandenburger Tor" (song), a song for the Eurovision Song Contest 1990 by Ketil Stokkan
- "Brandenburg Gate", a song from the Metallica and Lou Reed album, Lulu
- "Brandenburg Gate," a song by the band Anti-Flag on its American Spring album
- Brandenburg Gate, former name for the Harbour Gate in Szczecin, Poland
