= USS Brandenburg =

History

United States
- Name: USS Brandenburg
- Builder: Breme Vulkan Aktiengesellschaft
- Completed: 1901
- Commissioned: 9 May 1919
- Decommissioned: 20 May 1919
- Stricken: 1867 (est.)
- Fate: Broken for scrap, December 1924

General characteristics
- Displacement: 7,540 long tons (7,660 t)
- Length: 430 ft (130 m)
- Beam: 54 ft 3 in (16.54 m)
- Depth of hold: 39 ft 6 in (12.04 m)
- Propulsion: Steam
- Complement: 626 officers and enlisted
- Armament: none

USS Brandenburg was only briefly in the United States Navy.

Brandenburg was a twin-screw, steel-hulled steamship completed in 1901 by Bremer Vulkan Aktiengesellschaft of Bremen-Vegesack, Germany, for the Norddeutscher Lloyd Line, of Bremen. She was allocated to the United States when the Allied powers parceled out Germany’s merchant marine after World War I, and was commissioned at Southend-on-Sea, England, on 9 May 1919.

Sailing for Plymouth, England, on 10 May, Brandenburg arrived at her destination on the morning of the 11th, where she provisioned and coaled. Within a week of her arrival, dispatches concerning the ship indicated that the Allied Maritime Transport Council executive had allocated Brandenburg for “trooping between England and Northern Russia” and that repairs to fit her out for that service were estimated to take from three to four weeks. A shortage of enlisted men in the United States, however, prompted Vice Admiral Harry S. Knapp, Commander, U. S. Naval Forces in European Waters, to arrange for the British government take over the ship for the transport duty since the “trooping” would probably last through the summer. Accordingly, Brandenburg sailed for Liverpool on the afternoon of 17 May and arrived there on the afternoon of the 10th. At 1300 on 20 May 1919, Brandenburg was decommissioned and turned over to the Alfred Holt Steamship Company, accredited representatives of the British Admiralty. Brandenburg's former American crew then sailed for the United States in the transport Louisville.

Contemporary British mercantile lists carry Brandenburg as being operated by the Holt firm under government auspices at the outset. She remained in the hands of the Holt conglomerate, which included the Ocean Steamship Company (or, more colloquially, the Blue Funnel Line) through 1923. She was renamed Hecuba in 1923 and was broken up for scrap in Italy in December 1924.
