= John N. Brandenburg =

American lieutenant general (1929–2020)

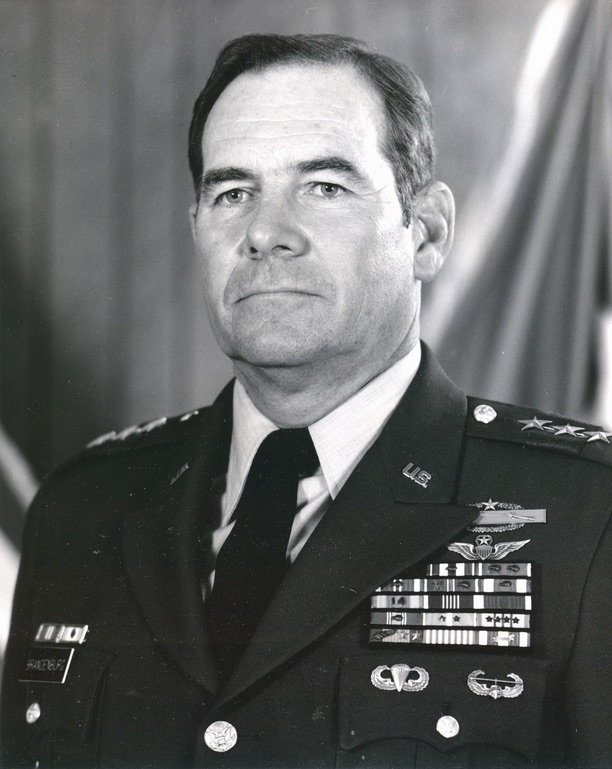
- Born: April 29, 1929; Enid, Oklahoma, U.S.
- Died: January 14, 2020 (aged 90); Canton, Georgia, U.S.
- Military career
- Allegiance: United States
- Branch: United States Army
- Service years: 1951–1984
- Rank: Lieutenant General
- Commands: I Corps; 101st Airborne Division
- Conflicts: Korean War; Vietnam War
- Awards: Army Distinguished Service Medal; Silver Star (2); Legion of Merit (3); Distinguished Flying Cross (2); Bronze Star Medal (2)

John Nelson Brandenburg (April 29, 1929 – January 14, 2020) was a lieutenant general in the United States Army. He was commander of I Corps at Fort Lewis from 1981 to 1984. He was also a commander of the 101st Airborne Division (1978–1980).

Brandenburg died at his home in Canton, Georgia, on January 14, 2020. He was 90.
