= Flughafen Berlin Brandenburg GmbH =

German airport operator

- Type: GmbH
- Industry: Transport
- Founded: 1991
- Headquarters: Berlin Brandenburg Airport, Schönefeld, Germany
- Key people: Engelbert Lütke Daldrup (CEO); Rainer Bretschneider (chairman of the supervisory board)
- Services: Airport operation
- Revenue: EUR 263.2 million
- Number of employees: 1,436
- Website: berlin-airport.de

Flughafen Berlin Brandenburg GmbH, commonly abbreviated FBB, is a German airport operator. It operates Berlin Brandenburg Airport (BER) and previously operated Tegel and Schönefeld airports prior to their 2020 closures.

FBB is owned by the German states of Berlin and Brandenburg (37 percent each), with the remaining shares being held by the Federal Republic of Germany (represented by the ministries of Transport and Finance).

== History ==
When plans for a new Berlin Airport were made following German reunification, Berlin Brandenburg Flughafen Holding GmbH (BBF) was founded on 2 May 1991. In a privatisation attempt, Hochtief was considered a suitable future owner and operator of the proposed airport and in 1998 negotiations commenced about the conditions under which Hochtief would acquire BBF. In 2003, it was decided to have the airport come under public ownership instead. BBF was renamed Berlin Brandenburg Flughafen GmbH (FBB) and serves as owner of the new airport since construction started in 2006.

Due to the construction and opening delays at the new airport, Rainer Schwarz, the CEO of FBB, was dismissed from his post on 16 January 2013. He was succeeded by Hartmut Mehdorn, the previous CEO of Air Berlin, who took the office on 8 March 2013. Klaus Wowereit, the Berlin mayor who had served as chairman of the FBB supervisory board since 2001, also stepped down from his post and was subsequently replaced by Matthias Platzeck, the Minister-President of Brandenburg.

During his tenure Hartmut Mehdorn appointed Jochen Grossmann as technical head, who was subsequently found guilty of corruption and fraud in June 2014 after demanding payment from potential contractors. Mehdorn announced a new opening date of "end of 2016" on 12 December 2014, only to quit as CEO three days later on 15 December and was replaced by Karsten Mühlenfeld in March 2015. Mühlenfeld himself was later forced to terminate his contract early after the BER project was hit by delay after delay. One of his last acts as CEO was to announce a new opening date of 2018 for a project that began in 2006 and was initially supposed to open in 2011. He was replaced in March 2017 by Berlin's Secretary for Housing and Construction Engelbert Lütke Daldrup.

After numerous further delays, BER opened for commercial airline traffic on 31 October 2020.

== COVID-19 ==
In January 2021, it was reported that FBB had lost 90% of its traffic-related income. The company is expecting a shortfall of 83 million passengers until 2025. Pessimists suspect lower passenger numbers until 2027. In any case, the board has decided it needs an additional 660 million euros to keep operating in 2021. A board member commented that "it can't work if the shareholders do not assume a part of the debt".
