= Berlin Brandenburg Airport =

International airport in Germany

Berlin Brandenburg Airport Flughafen Berlin Brandenburg

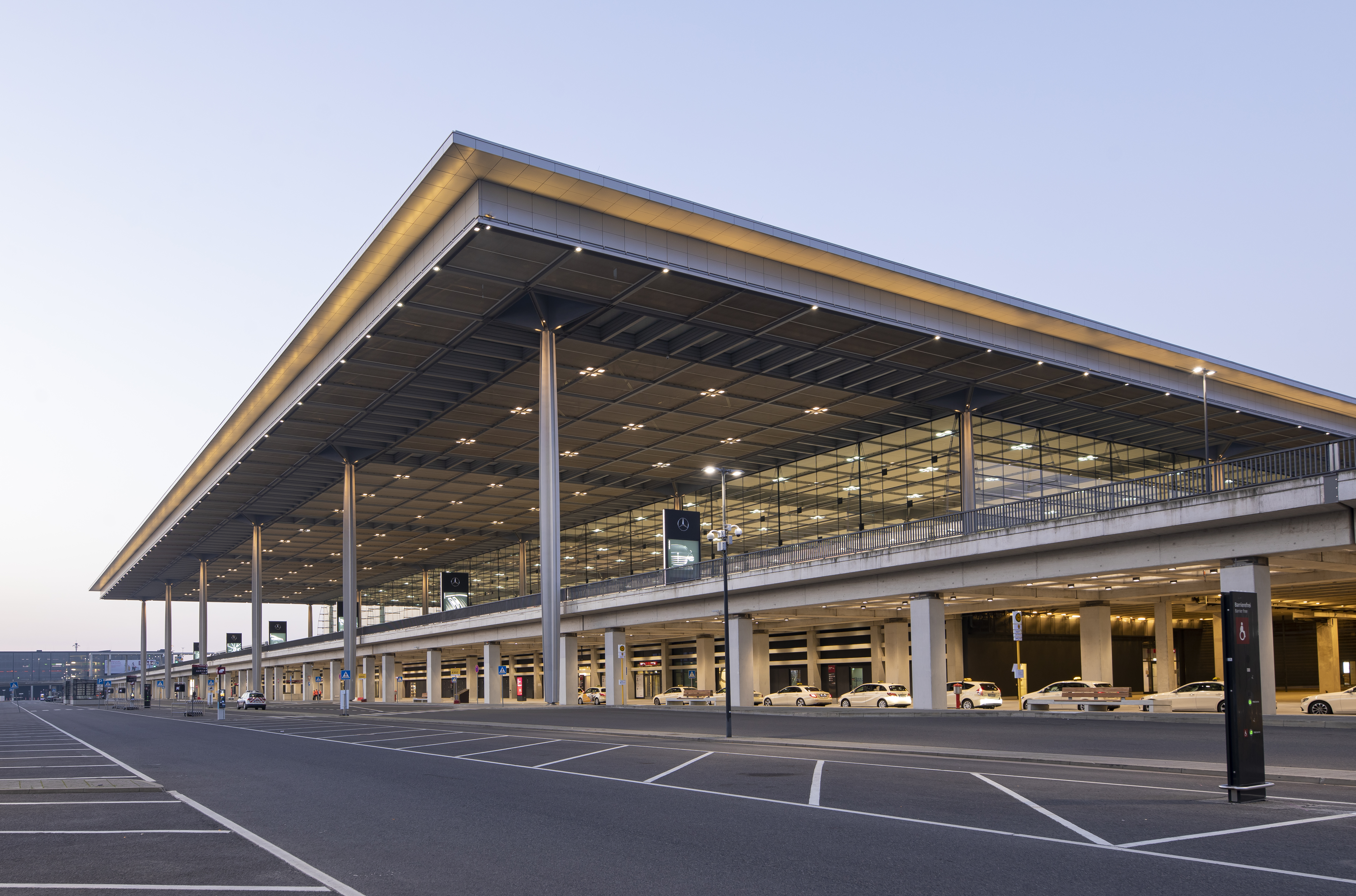
- IATA: BER; ICAO: EDDB; WMO: 10385

Summary
- Airport type: Public
- Owner/Operator: Flughafen Berlin Brandenburg GmbH
- Serves: Berlin/Brandenburg Metropolitan Region
- Location: Schönefeld, Brandenburg
- Opened: 31 October 2020; 6 years ago
- Operating base for: Condor; easyJet; Eurowings; Sundair
- Elevation AMSL: 157 ft (48 m)
- Coordinates: 52°22′00″N 013°30′12″E
- Website: ber.berlin-airport.de

Maps
- Location at the Berlin-Brandenburg border BER/EDDB (Europe)
- Interactive map of Berlin Brandenburg Airport

Runways
| Direction | Length | | Surface |
| Direction | m | ft | Surface |
|---|---|---|---|
| 06L/24R | 3,600 | 11,811 | Asphalt |
| 06R/24L | 4,000 | 13,123 | Concrete |

Statistics (2025)
- Passenger volume: 26,050,880 ▲ +2.3%
- Aircraft movements: 193,042 ▲ +0.7%
- Cargo (metric tons): 52,293 ▲ +14.4%

Berlin Brandenburg Airport (German: Flughafen Berlin Brandenburg „Willy Brandt“; IATA: BER, ICAO: EDDB; German pronunciation: [beːʔeːˈʔɛɐ̯]) is an international airport in Schönefeld, just south of the German capital and state of Berlin, in the state of Brandenburg. It is located 18 kilometres (11 mi) south-east of the city centre and serves as a base for Condor, easyJet, Eurowings and Sundair. It mostly has flights to European metropolitan and leisure destinations as well as a number of intercontinental services.

The new airport replaced Tempelhof, Schönefeld, and Tegel airports (with the first already closed in 2008, followed by the last two in 2020), and has since become the only commercial airport serving Berlin and the surrounding State of Brandenburg, an area with 6 million inhabitants; however, much of Schönefeld's underlying infrastructure, including a runway, has been re-used by the new airport, and some of Berlin Brandenburg's new infrastructure, such as the control tower, was used by Schönefeld's operations in the lead-up to BER's proper opening. With projected annual passenger numbers of around 34 million, Berlin Brandenburg Airport has become the third busiest airport in Germany, surpassing Düsseldorf Airport and making it the twenty-fourth busiest in Europe.

At the time of opening, the airport had a theoretical capacity of 46 million passengers per year. Terminal 1 accounts for 28 million of this; Terminal 2, which did not open until 24 March 2022, having been delayed by the COVID-19 pandemic, accounts for 6 million; and Terminal 5, the terminal buildings of the former Berlin-Schönefeld Airport, accounts for another 12 million. Planned further expansion would bring the airport's total annual capacity to 58 million passengers by 2035.

The airport was originally planned to open in October 2011, five years after starting construction in 2006. The project encountered successive delays due to poor construction planning, execution, management, and corruption. Berlin Brandenburg Airport finally received its operational licence in May 2020, and opened for commercial traffic on 31 October 2020, 14 years after construction started and 29 years after official planning was begun. Schönefeld's refurbished passenger facilities were incorporated as Terminal 5 on 25 October 2020 while all other airlines completed the transition from Tegel to Berlin Brandenburg Airport by 8 November 2020.

== History ==
=== Plans for a new Berlin Airport ===
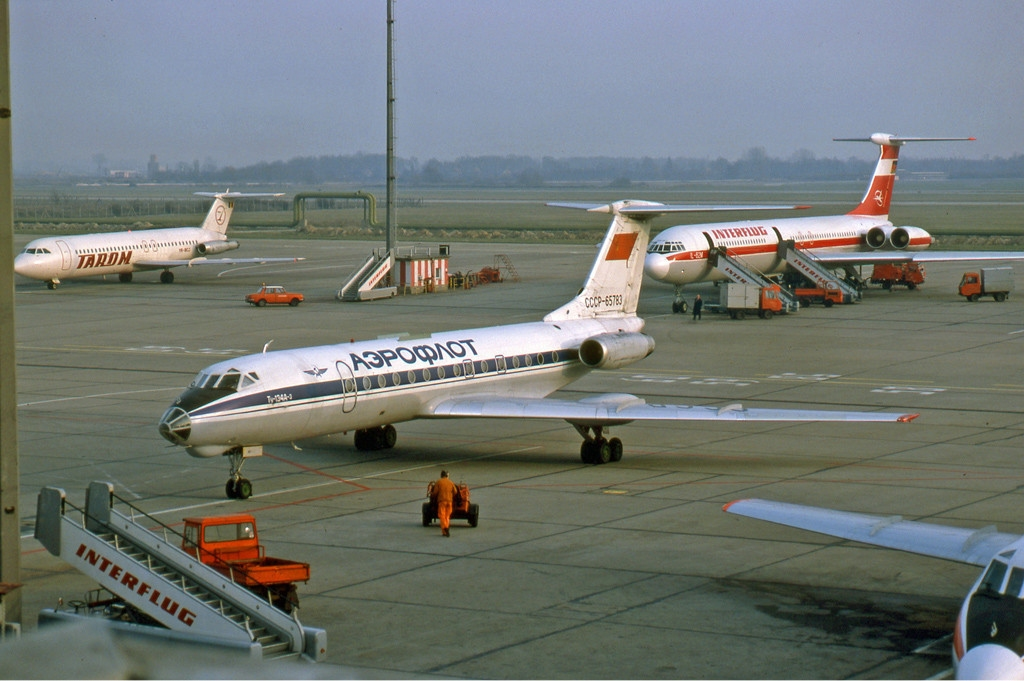
A view of the apron of Berlin Schönefeld Airport (1990)

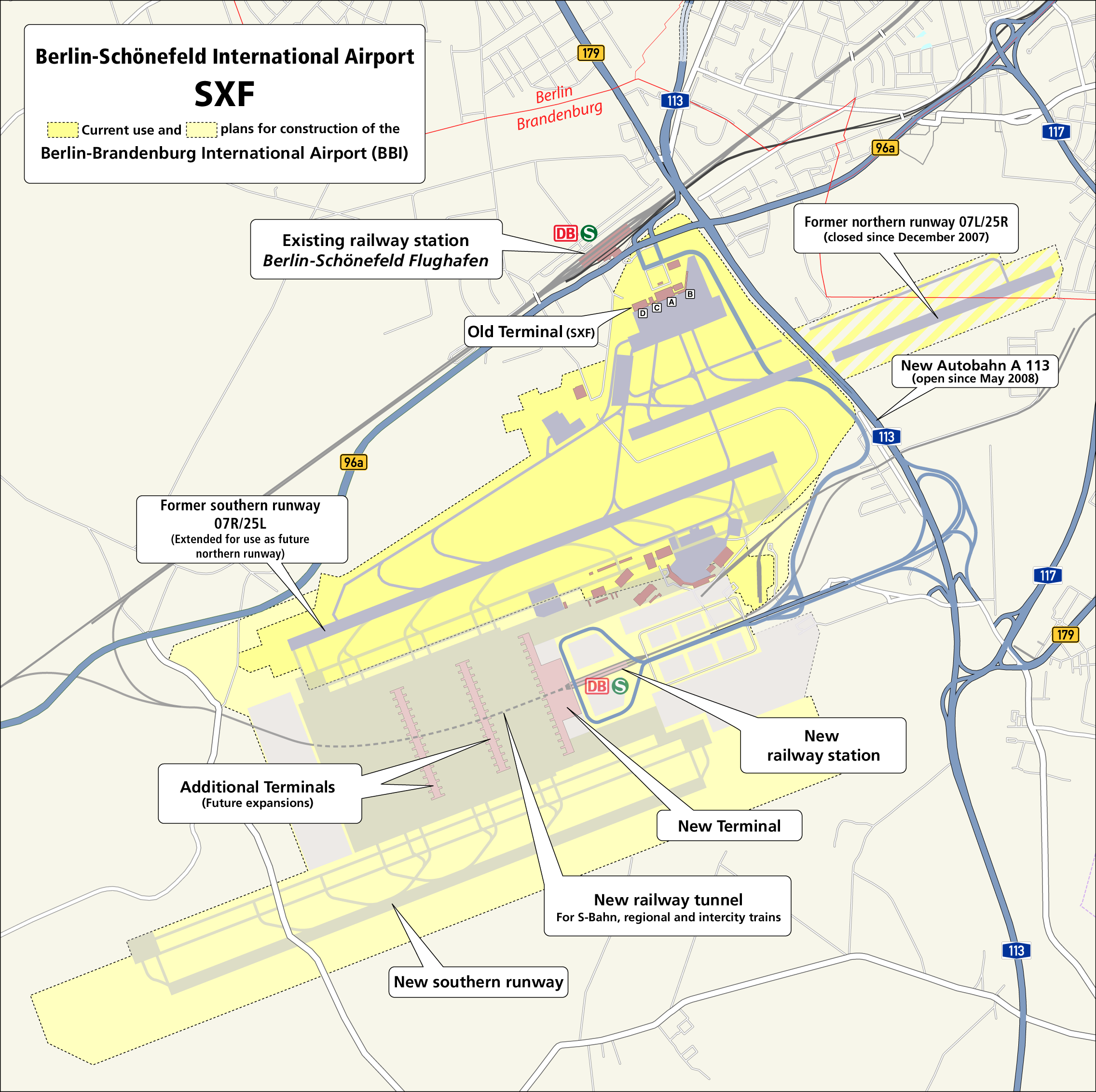
Map showing the infrastructure of the Schönefeld area and the relationship between the new and old airports

After the fall of the Berlin Wall in 1989, and following German reunification in 1990, Berlin once again became the German federal capital; leaders made plans to recognise the city's increased importance by constructing a large commercial airport. The existing airports — Tegel, Schönefeld and Tempelhof — were ageing and becoming increasingly congested with rising passenger numbers. To ensure the economic viability of the project, they pursued the single airport concept: the new airport would become the sole commercial airport for Berlin and Brandenburg. They planned to close Tegel, Schönefeld and Tempelhof upon opening the new airport, then ban commercial aviation from any other airport in Brandenburg.

On 2 May 1991, the Berlin Brandenburg Flughafen Holding GmbH (BBF) was founded, owned by the states of Berlin and Brandenburg (37% each) and the Federal Republic of Germany (the remaining 26%). Eberhard Diepgen, Mayor of Berlin, became the first chairman of the supervisory board. The holding company announced on 20 June 1993 that Sperenberg Airfield, Jüterbog Airfield and the area south of Schönefeld Airport, where the evaluation of the locations Sperenberg, Jüterbog East, Jüterbog West, Tietzow, Michelsdorf, Borkheide and Schönefeld South was carried out according to five criteria with different weighting. Each site was advocated by various factions in the ensuing political discussion. With regard to land-use planning and noise pollution, rural Sperenberg and Jüterbog were considered more suitable for construction of a large airport. Economic considerations favoured an airport located near the city centre, with existing road and rail links (as is the case with Schönefeld).

On 28 May 1996, Mayor Diepgen, Minister-President of Brandenburg Manfred Stolpe and Federal Minister for Transport Matthias Wissmann committed to Schönefeld as the site for the new airport. This so-called consensus decision was later affirmed by the respective state legislatures. The new airport would use some infrastructure, such as a runway, from the existing Schönefeld Airport.

=== Failed privatisation ===
Originally, BBF anticipated that the new airport would be owned and operated by a private investor. They called for proposals, which led to two bidding consortia emerging as serious contenders. One was led by Hochtief through its Hochtief Airport subsidiary and included ABB, Fraport and Bankengesellschaft Berlin as partners. The other consortium comprised IVG, Flughafen Wien AG, Dorsch-Consult, Commerzbank and Caisse des Dépôts. On 19 September 1998, BBF announced that the Hochtief consortium were the successful bidder. This saw them granted exclusive authority to negotiate the terms and conditions for an acquisition of the Berlin Brandenburg Airport holding and the construction and operation of the new airport for 50 years.

On 31 March 1999, BBF officially commissioned Hochtief and its partners to construct the new airport, causing IVG to file a lawsuit. The Brandenburg Oberlandesgericht acknowledged the concerns voiced by IVG. In its review, it found that in certain points the assessment of the applications had been biased towards Hochtief. This led to annulment of the contract award on 3 August of that year.

Hochtief Airport and IVG teamed up and created a plan for a joint bid on 10 November 2000 in an attempt to receive the contract to construct and operate the new airport. At the time BBF hoped that the planning approval could be completed in 2002, with the tentative opening in 2007.

When Hochtief/IVG submitted its bid in February 2002, the BBF board consisted of Manfred Stolpe, who would become Federal Minister of Transportation; Klaus Wowereit, who replaced Eberhard Diepgen as Mayor of Berlin and chair of the board; and Matthias Platzeck, who replaced Stolpe as Minister-President of Brandenburg. The board determined that the proposal would not be practical and voted 22 May 2003 to scrap the privatisation plan. Hochtief and IVG received approximately €50 million compensation for their planning effort.

=== Public ownership and construction permit ===
The new Berlin airport would be planned, owned and operated by BBF Holding. Shortly afterwards BBF Holding became Flughafen Berlin Brandenburg GmbH (FBB) and remained under the ownership of Berlin, Brandenburg and the federal government. On 13 August 2004, the Brandenburg state ministry for infrastructure and regional policy granted approval for the development of Schönefeld Airport into the new Berlin Brandenburg International Airport.

A legal battle ensued, as local residents filed lawsuits against the ministry's decision. The dispute ended 16 March 2006, when the Federal Administrative Court of Germany rejected the residents' arguments. The court imposed stipulations on flight operations at the new airport. The construction permit was granted only under the condition that once operational, the number of people living in the approach path would be lower compared to the situation surrounding the three existing airports – Tegel, Schönefeld and Tempelhof. Therefore, it was mandatory for Tegel and Schönefeld to close (Tempelhof was already decommissioned in 2008) once Berlin's air traffic was concentrated at the new airport.

=== Construction progress and issues ===
Berlin Brandenburg Airport was originally planned to open in October 2011, five years after starting construction in 2006. However, the project encountered a series of successive delays due to poor construction planning, execution, management, and corruption. The airport received its operational licence in May 2020, and opened for commercial traffic on 31 October 2020, 14 years after construction started and 29 years after official planning was begun. Schönefeld's refurbished passenger facilities were incorporated as Terminal 5 on 25 October 2020 while all other airlines completed the transition from Tegel to Berlin Brandenburg Airport by 8 November 2020.

The most significant cause for the continuing delays was the fire protection and alarm system. In the terminal building, the system was not built according to the construction permit and failed the mandatory acceptance test necessary to open the airport. FBB proposed an interim solution employing up to 700 human fire spotters, which was rejected by the building supervision department of the local Dahme-Spreewald district.

Inspectors uncovered flaws in the wiring, programming and implementation of the highly complex control system for smoke extractors and fire doors designed by Siemens and Bosch. For aesthetic reasons, designers decided that the terminal would have smoke extraction ducts in its ceiling, but that they would not exhaust to its rooftop. Instead, smoke would be pumped from the ceiling into a shaft running down and through the basement below the building's structure. This required the natural rising behaviour of hot air in the shaft to be reversed. Achieving this on the scale necessary for this airport is a unique undertaking, and so far this elaborate smoke extraction system has not worked as planned. To meet the acceptance test requirements, the fire system needed major reconstruction work. The system was to be rebuilt and divided into three areas in order to make it "manageable". The cost of this work was reported as being a nine-digit figure.

It emerged that Alfredo di Mauro, who designed the fire safety system, was not a qualified engineer. While his business cards stated he was an engineer, he was actually qualified as an engineering draughtsman. Di Mauro was dismissed by the airport company in early May 2014. In the termination notice, the company cited "serious defects" in his work and that trust in their relationship was "now finally shattered". The airport company went on to state that Di Mauro's plans would be "disposed of".

Another major factor impacting on the construction of the airport was insolvency of general planner Planungsgemeinschaft Flughafen Berlin Brandenburg International (pg bbi) and the dismissal of the Gerkan, Marg and Partners architects. Inspectors have uncovered many examples of poor workmanship due to a lack of proper supervision and documentation, most notably concerning the wiring. Reports have surfaced about cable conduits that held too many cables or held cables in incompatible combinations, such as phone lines next to high voltage wires. A total of 60 kilometres (37 mi) of cooling pipes were allegedly installed with no thermal insulation. To correct this, the demolition of numerous walls was necessary. Furthermore, exterior vents appeared to be in improper locations, which allowed rainwater from the western facade to enter them.

=== Financing ===
By 2009, the construction cost was budgeted at €2.83 billion. FBB raised the financing for the project by a credit raising of €2.4 billion, a bank deposit of €430 million by the FBB partners, and an additional €440 million of equity capital provided by FBB.

During construction, it became clear that the airport's costs would significantly increase as a result of initial underestimates, construction flaws, and increased expenses for soundproofing nearby homes. By 2012, the series of delays in opening was expected to lead to a number of lawsuits against FBB with the now defunct Air Berlin announcing its intentions of such a move.

By late 2012, expenditures for Berlin Brandenburg Airport totaled €4.3 billion, almost twice the originally anticipated figure.

It became clear in November 2015 that the financial concept of the airport was fundamentally flawed. The main purpose of the many stores planned at the airport was to serve passengers who were changing planes, assuming that Berlin would be a big international hub. It was acknowledged in 2015 that competition between the hubs was already too intense. Frankfurt Airport and London Heathrow would resist losing passenger shares without a price war and that few if any airlines would abandon their hubs for Berlin. The only remaining potential airline for operating a hub was Air Berlin, which was in financial difficulties.

German Railways Deutsche Bahn also sued for non-usage of the ghost station below the airport in 2012, with the airport having to pay damages.

In November 2015, auditors with the Brandenburg Comptroller concluded that financial control executed by Berlin, Brandenburg, and Germany over the airport as owners was insufficient and inefficient. The Comptroller published a 400-page report in February 2016 describing the flawed opening including several construction lapses. This led the BER boss to retaliate publicly against the comptroller on 27 February decrying the release of the numbers.

Soundproofing nearby homes would be €50 million more expensive because of a verdict of the main administrative courts of the states of Berlin and Brandenburg. On 5 May 2016, the Federal Administrative Court decided in favour of 25,500 plaintiffs. The key directive of the verdict was that rooms must be provided with adequate ventilation if windows are closed for noise, and the airport authority must also determine how air inside the structures can be vented. The airport avoided liability claims against Imtech and other firms involved in the construction of the fire exhaust system.

By 2015, total costs amounted to €5.4 billion. Revised plans suggest additional costs amounting to an extra €2.19 billion. On 3 June 2015, Germany applied for a €2.5 billion spending approval from the EU, to be added to the previous total of €4.3 billion, bringing total costs to €6.8 billion. Financing for the entire airport appeared headed toward bankruptcy when the EU was unwilling to approve the pending request. If the request were to be denied, the airport authority stated it would be bankrupt by August 2016. The EU would only permit an additional €2.2 billion, which it did on 3 August 2016. A €2.4 billion loan was signed on 13 February 2017 containing €1.1 billion for financing and €1.3 billion to resolve old bad loans. The German federal government and the states of Berlin and Brandenburg guaranteed the debt.

Although the airport had yet to open, officials were already planning a possible third runway for approximately €1 billion, and other new projects, such as an additional terminal, expanded baggage system and another freight facility. The total additional spending would amount to €3.2 billion. The board warned of a further rise in costs because the airport would not open before 2017: the current cost frame at that time was limited to 2016; the estimated cost of €6.9 billion was current as of May 2016. The airport company reportedly made the assurance to the European Investment Bank that the airport would open in September 2019. However, forecasts estimated the airport would not be ready to open until 2020. This would require an additional €500 million refinancing to bridge the gap between 2019 and 2020. The airport published a need for another billion euros up until 2020. Thus the three years of work from 2018 onwards would cost at least €900 million. The total cost of the airport will top €6.5 billion.

On 13 January 2018, the company requested an additional €2.8 billion for extensions until 2030. Taking that into account, the total cost came to €9.4 billion, with a total of €10.3 billion if the €900 million in overhead costs for 2019–2020 were factored in. An economical estimate determined the costs for the overhead at a conservative figure of €770 million. The airport was planning to borrow €400 million. Another issue arose when it became public that the airport head was earning an annual salary of €500,000. A new loan was granted by the German parliament on 30 June 2018 totaling €132 million. With the other two owners, the states of Brandenburg and Berlin, permitting their shares of the loan as well, the loan would total €500 million. The board postponed a decision concerning the loan until the end of August 2018, which left the entire finance planning in jeopardy. At the end of August 2018, Berlin's head of finance, Matthias Kollatz, remarked that the airport might face abrupt bankruptcy on 1 January 2019 if no immediate measures were to be taken. The financial head resigned from the holding company of Berlin's airports at the end of September 2019. According to projections the airport was in dire need of additional €508 million from 2021 onwards. Reports indicated another need for financial support from authorities for the next 2 years as of 29 April 2020 amounting to €1.8 billion. A new study claimed that the net worth of the current building was far lower than the credited €4.866 billion and would be settled at €3 billion less. The financial gap due to the COVID-19 pandemic was estimated to be €300 million for Tegel and Schönefeld combined, thus the new airport would be in need for financial support for years to come. The 2019 annual report from BER's operating firm was criticised by The Left as extremely short and not transparent. Cash flow concerns amounted to an immediate €1.5 billion by 20 June 2020.

On 13 July 2020, prosecutors filed a complaint on suspicion of falsifying the balance sheet. The financial auditors for FBB were the same as for the now insolvent Wirecard company, raising doubts about the validity of the audits. The plan to generate profits starting in 2023/2024 had been interrupted by the COVID-19 pandemic, according to airport head Engelbert Lütke-Daldrup.

The FBB announced on 9 October 2020 a need for €375 million for 2021 to cover current costs for BER. An additional €552 million were needed as a stabilization for missing passengers.

=== Naming ===
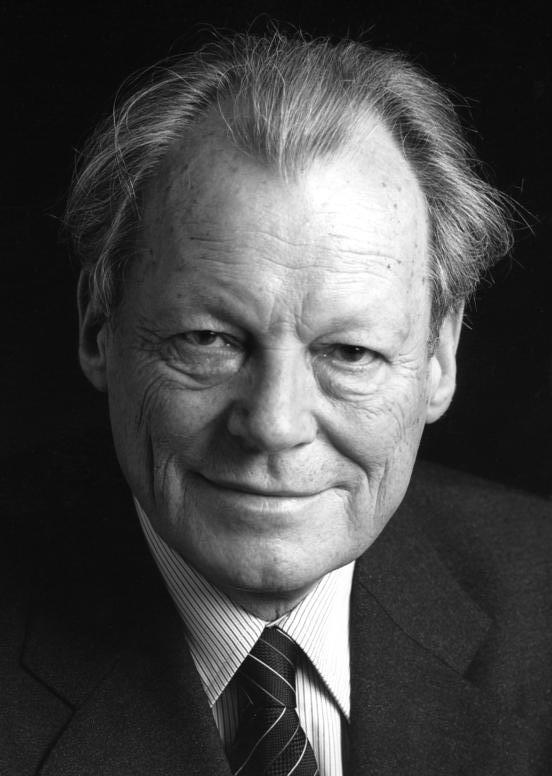
The airport is named after Nobel Peace Laureate Willy Brandt, former mayor of West Berlin and chancellor of West Germany.

During much of the planning and construction phase the new airport was known as Berlin Brandenburg International Airport, abbreviated BBI. It was then discovered that the IATA code BBI already referred to Biju Patnaik Airport (also known as Bhubaneswar Airport) in India. When the planned opening date of 2 June 2012 drew nearer, the FBB launched a marketing campaign introducing the BER branding, reflecting the new airport code.

In 2007, the FBB board decided that Berlin Brandenburg Airport would be given a second name, honouring a person with a distinctive link to the city of Berlin. On 11 December 2009, the decision was made in favour of Willy Brandt. The Nobel Peace laureate of 1971 served as mayor of West Berlin from 1957 to 1966 and as West German chancellor from 1969 to 1974. Berlin mayor Klaus Wowereit and Minister-President of Brandenburg Matthias Platzeck, both members of the SPD (which Brandt led from 1964 to 1987) led the effort to add Brandt's name to the airport.

Other suggested honorees included Claus Schenk Graf von Stauffenberg, Albert Einstein and Marlene Dietrich (suggested by members of the Christian Democratic Union), Gustav Stresemann (nominated by the Free Democratic Party), and Otto Lilienthal (advocated by the Green Party).

As a result of the construction problems affecting the airport and the continuous negative publicity it got in the German and international press, the Willy Brandt Foundation considered revoking the airport's permission to bear the former chancellor's name. This is due to concerns that an ongoing association might be considered disrespectful towards his legacy. However, no such measure has been taken up until the day of its opening.

== Terminals ==
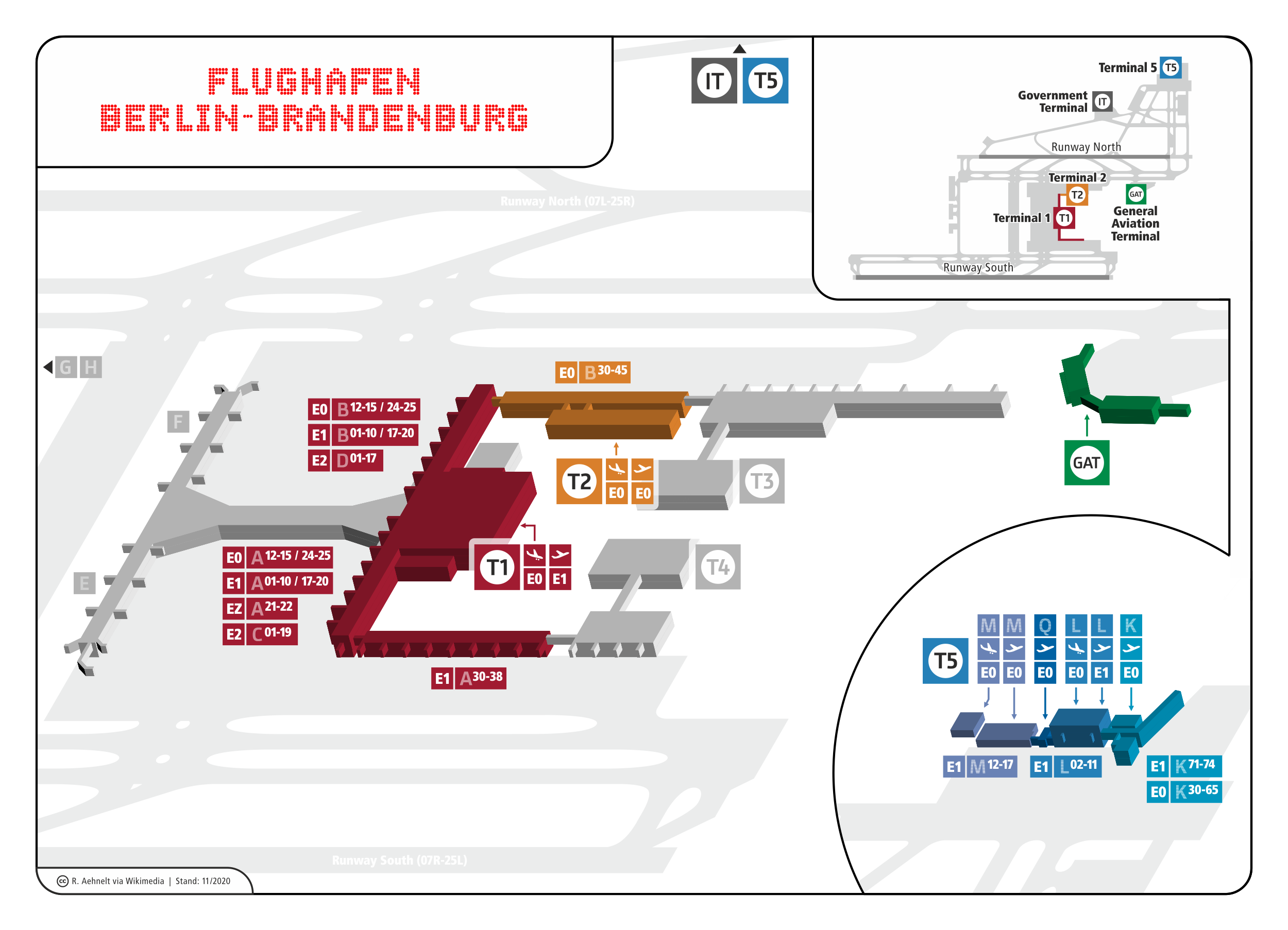
Terminal layout including Terminal 2 as well as the now closed Terminal 5, the former Schönefeld Airport

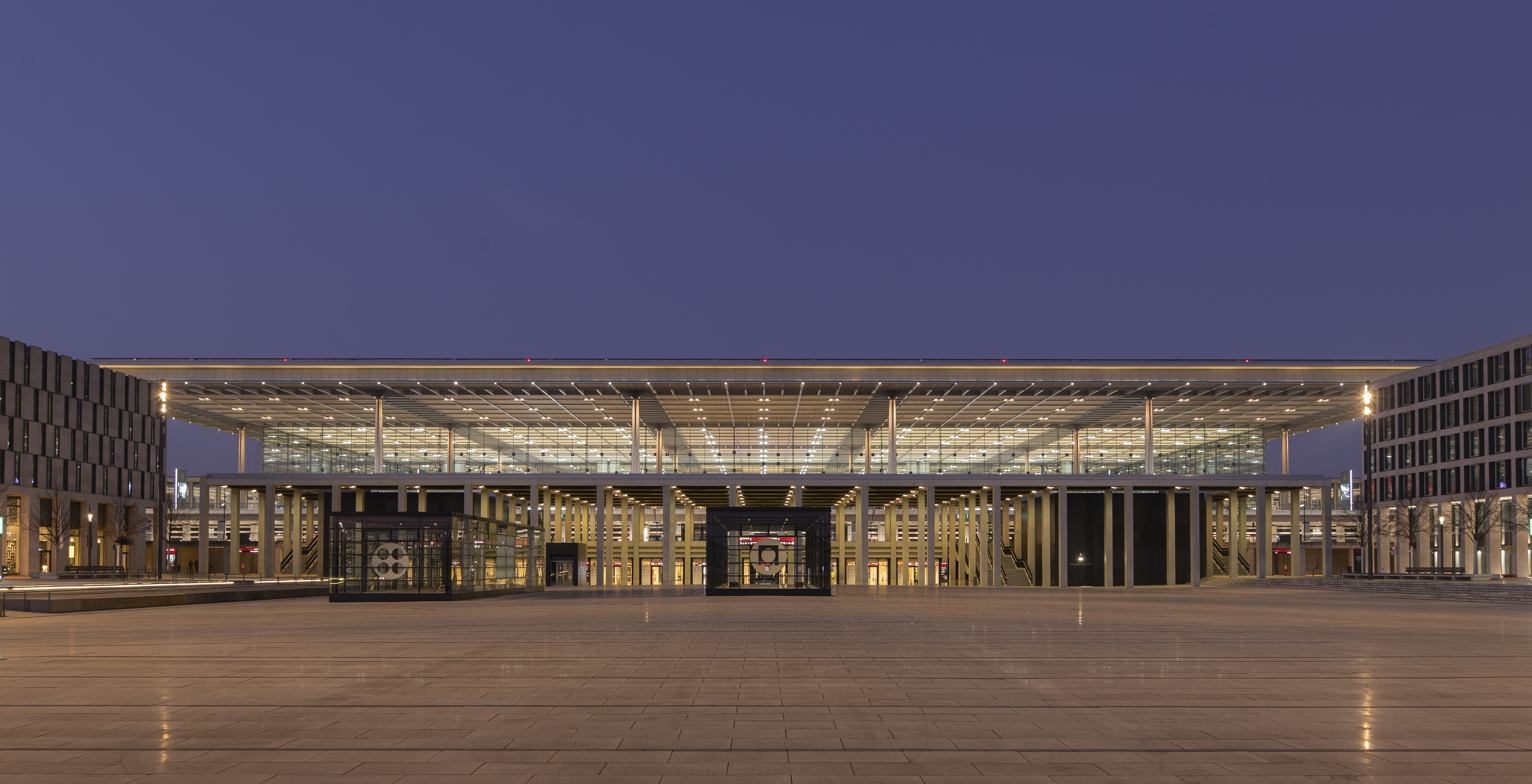
Terminal 1 exterior

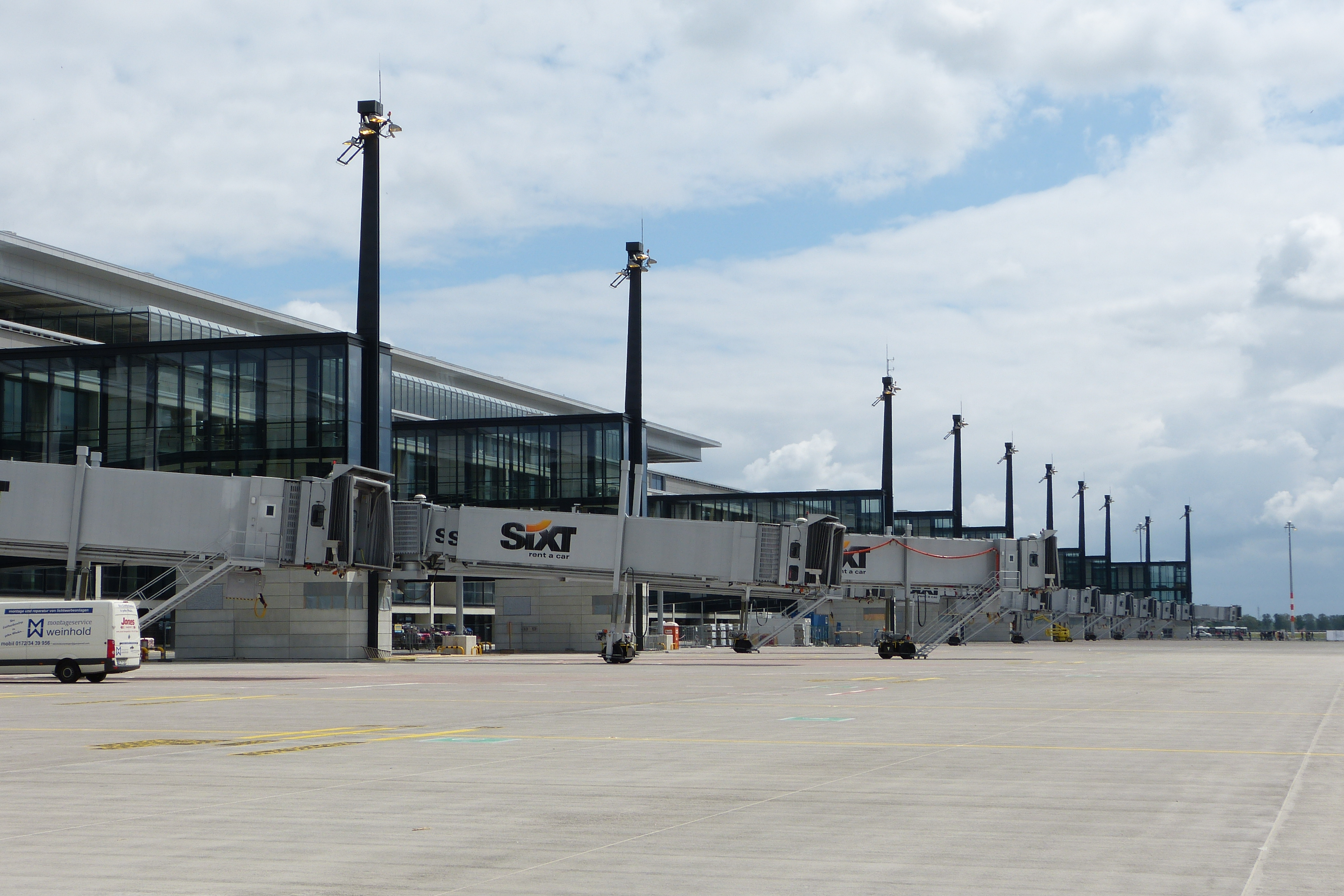
Terminal 1 exterior

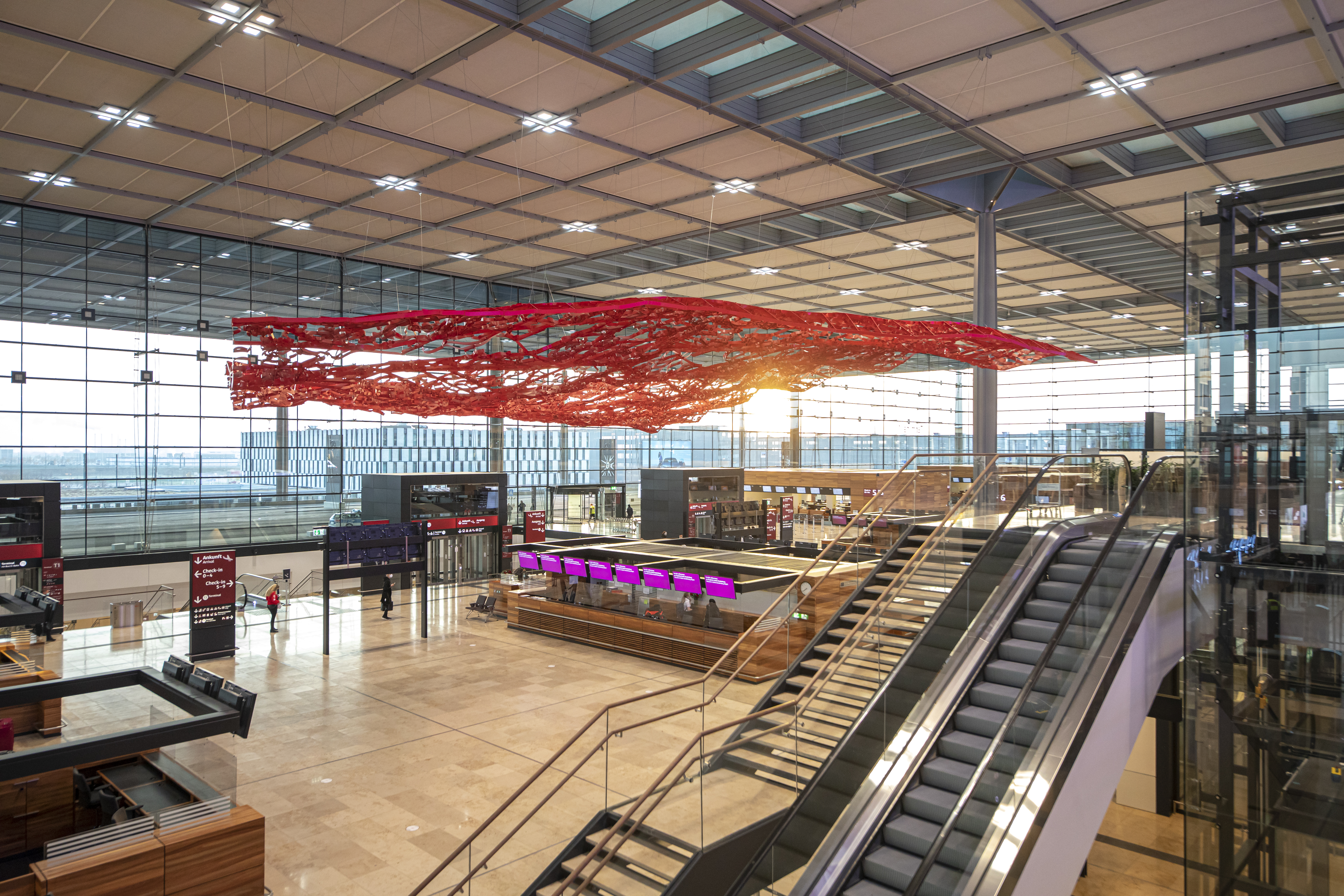
Pae White's THE Magic Carpet is suspended within Terminal 1

=== Terminal 1 ===
The U-shaped main terminal building of Berlin Brandenburg Airport, named Terminal 1 and consisting of sections A, B (01-25), C and D, was designed by gmp architects. They are the same company that designed the hexagonal Terminal A at Tegel Airport, which opened in 1974. At BER, the terminal sits between the two runways, creating a so-called midfield airport above the underground train station. The terminal has four public levels, designated 0, 1, 2 and 3.

The check-in area is located in the public area at Level 1 and houses 118 counters organised in eight clusters, called check-in aisles. Planners anticipate that a significant number of passengers will use the more than 100 self check-in machines that will be installed. Additionally, by May 2015, two extensions had been added to both sides of the main check-in area, containing 12 more check-in counters and eight security lanes each to avoid overcrowding of the main hall.

The airside area is accessible only to ticketed and screened passengers. Securitas Germany will staff the 35 screening stations. BER is equipped with 25 jet bridges with another 85 aircraft stands on the apron. The boarding and arrival areas are divided into three piers with the main pier 715 metres (2,350 ft) long, and the north and south piers at 350 metres (1,150 ft) each. The main pier contains 16 jet-bridges; all but one have two levels, thus, separating arriving and departing passengers. Level 1 is intended for Schengen Area passengers (gates A01–A20, B01–B20), while Level 2 (gates C01–C19, D01–D17) is for non-Schengen passengers. Eight of the gates can accommodate wide-body aircraft, and one gate has been designed to accommodate the Airbus A380. The apron has sufficient space to allow installation of a dual jetway allowing a quick boarding and disembarking process. A mezzanine (Level Z) at gates A21–22 and B21 allows for additional pre-boarding security checks for high-risk flights to the United States and Israel. Lufthansa operates an airport lounge at the north end of the main pier (gate B20), which will also be open for passengers of the respective alliance partners. An airport-operated lounge is located at the south end of the main pier (gate A20), which is contracted by most of the non-Star Alliance carriers operating from T1.

The south pier was reserved for near-exclusive use of defunct Air Berlin and its Oneworld partners. The south terminal contains nine single-storey jet bridges (gates A30–A38). The north pier features a more minimalist design compared to the other two piers. This is to meet the demands of low-cost carriers and has no jetbridges but boarding gates (B30–45) with direct apron access.

Major operators at Terminal 1 are easyJet, the Lufthansa Group, Condor, Aegean Airlines, Air France–KLM, British Airways, Turkish Airlines, United Airlines and Qatar Airways, amongst others.

=== Terminal 2 ===
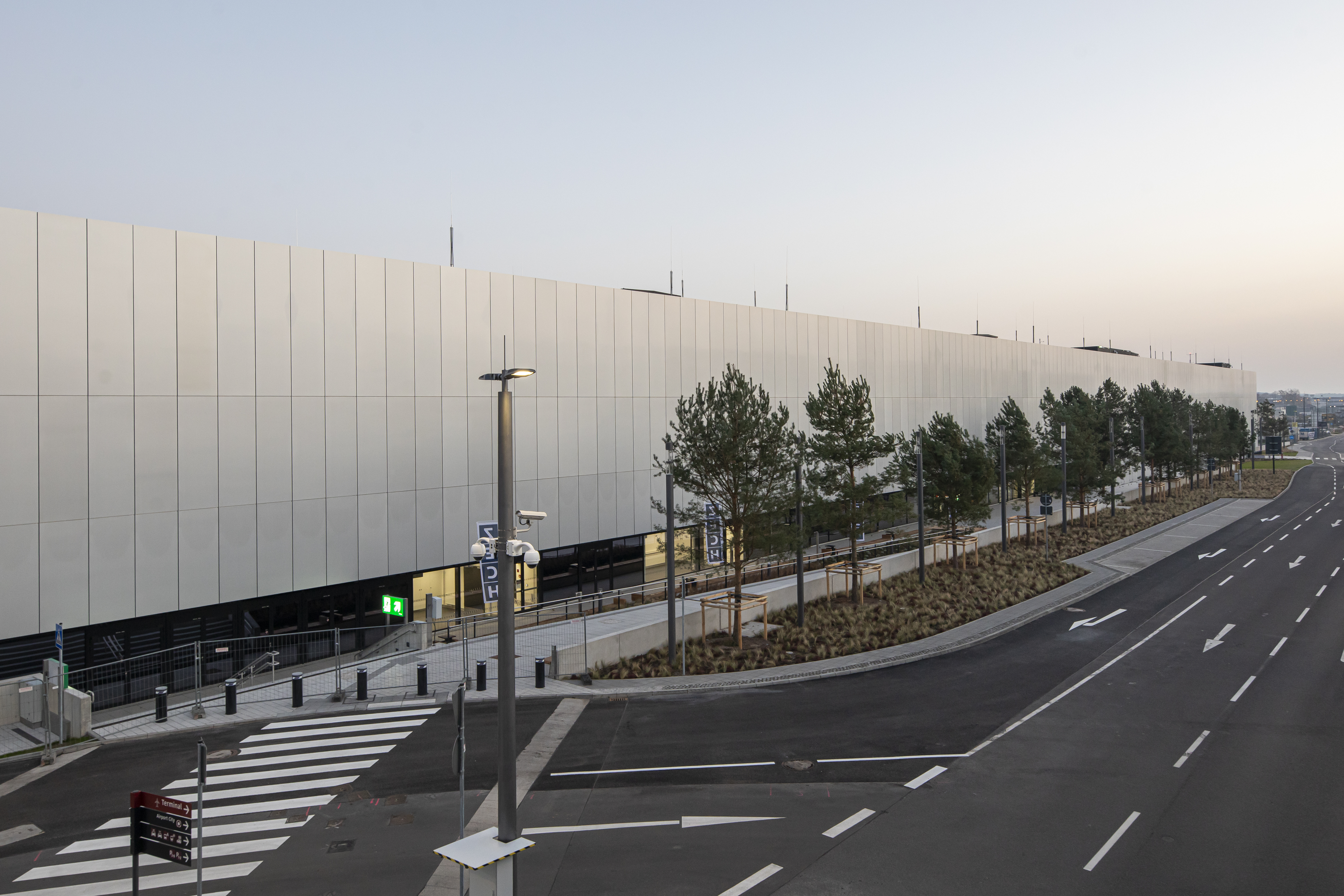
Exterior of Terminal 2

Plans for a separate low-cost airline terminal costing €200 million were released in March 2016. Construction for the now-named Terminal 2 with section B (30–45), which was originally constructed as part of Terminal 1, began in 2018 and finished in time in September 2020 to provide further capacity especially for low-cost carriers. Terminal 2 is constructed as a more basic-departures-and-arrivals facility next to the Terminal 1 main building, directly connected with its northern pier to gain more check-in capacity while sharing the same airside areas.

Originally Eurowings was supposed to operate their Berlin base out of Terminal 2. However, the COVID-19 pandemic kept the facility closed, as the capacity was not needed for the foreseeable future. Until then, all flights were handled in Terminal 1.

In November 2021 it was announced that demand for aviation had picked up so Terminal 1 had capacity issues. Therefore, Terminal 2 would open by April 2022 to offer relief. Terminal 2 was opened on 24 March 2022 with Ryanair as the primary tenant, but in November 2022, Wizz Air also moved its operations to the new terminal. The original intended user of the facility, Eurowings, remained in Terminal 1.

=== Former Terminal 5 ===
Terminal 5 was made up of the former terminal facilities of old Berlin Schönefeld Airport, which were refurbished and renamed from sections A, B, C, and D to K, L, Q, and M, respectively. In 2019, it was decided to leave the old facilities operational to provide more capacity for the expected passenger volume. The old tarmac at Schönefeld, which was refurbished and upgraded, was also used. Terminal 5, which was located on the north side of the airport, was connected with the central areas of the airport, Terminals 1 and 2, solely landside by the S-Bahn and public transit buses between the new airport station and the old station that formerly served Schönefeld Airport.

Terminal 5 was scheduled to be operated until the inauguration of the planned Terminal 3 by 2030. In November 2020, it was announced that Terminal 5 would be shut down temporarily for low passenger volume in the wake of the COVID-19 pandemic, with all flights relocating to the main Terminal 1. The terminal was closed until further notice on 22 February 2021 and was, at the time of closure, not expected to reopen again.

In January 2021, a vaccination center had opened at Terminal 5 to administer COVID-19 vaccines. The vaccination center also remained open after the closure of the terminal to flights. In March 2022, Terminal 5 was converted into a makeshift shelter to house refugees fleeing Ukraine.

In November 2022, the airport authority confirmed that Terminal 5 will remain closed permanently while airlines that previously operated from this terminal now operate from Terminal 2.

== Airport overview ==
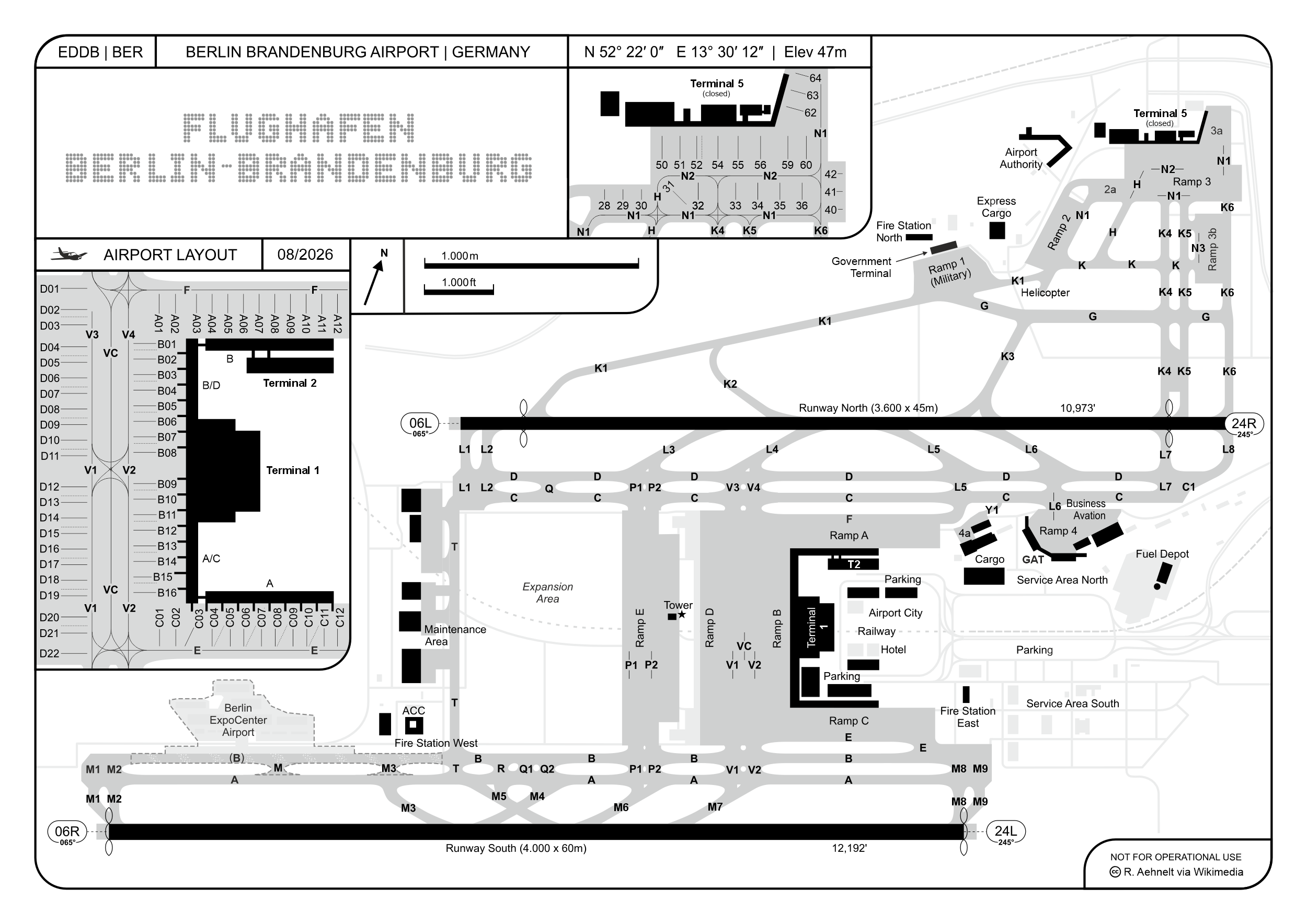
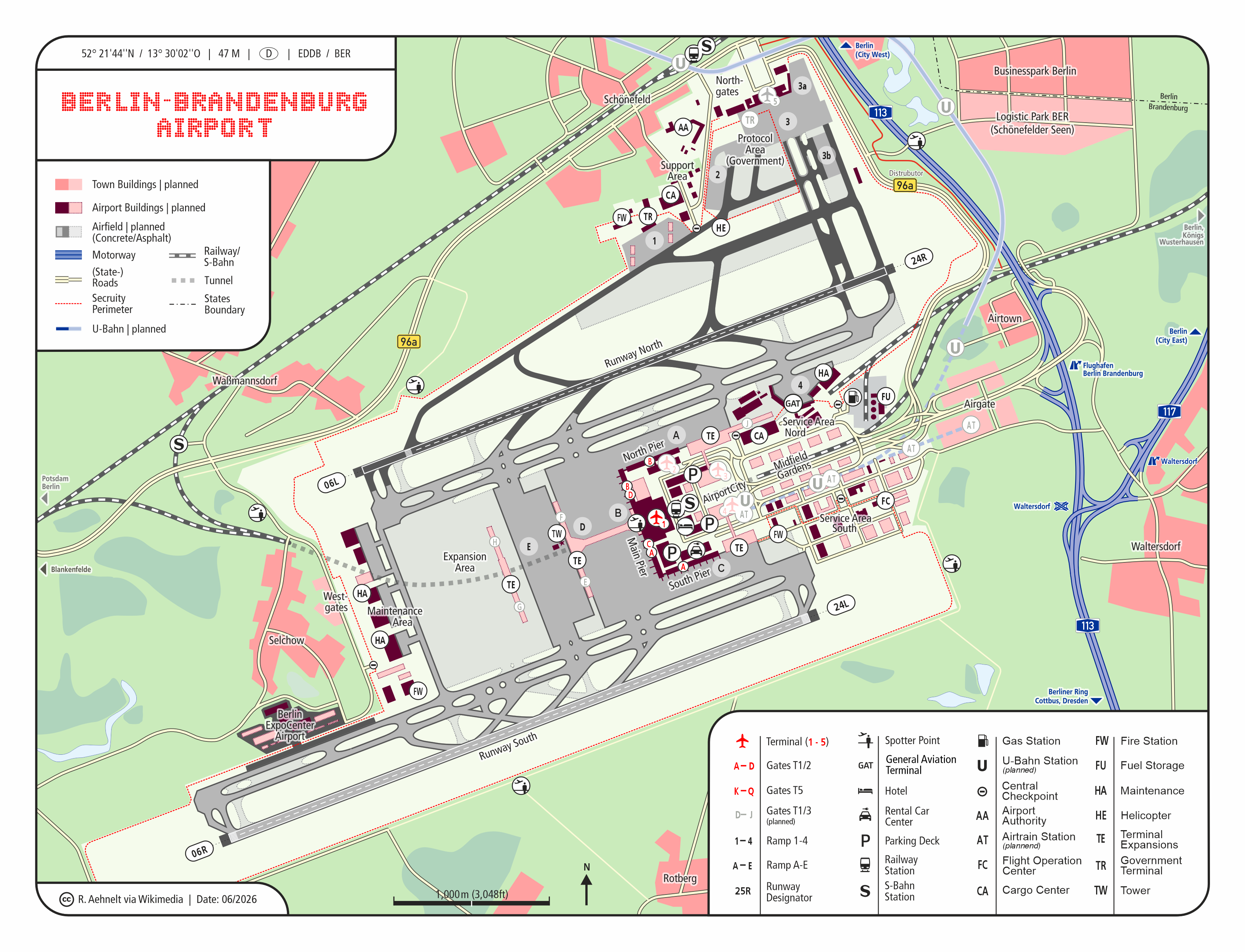
Current and planned layout of the airport, 2020

=== Runways ===
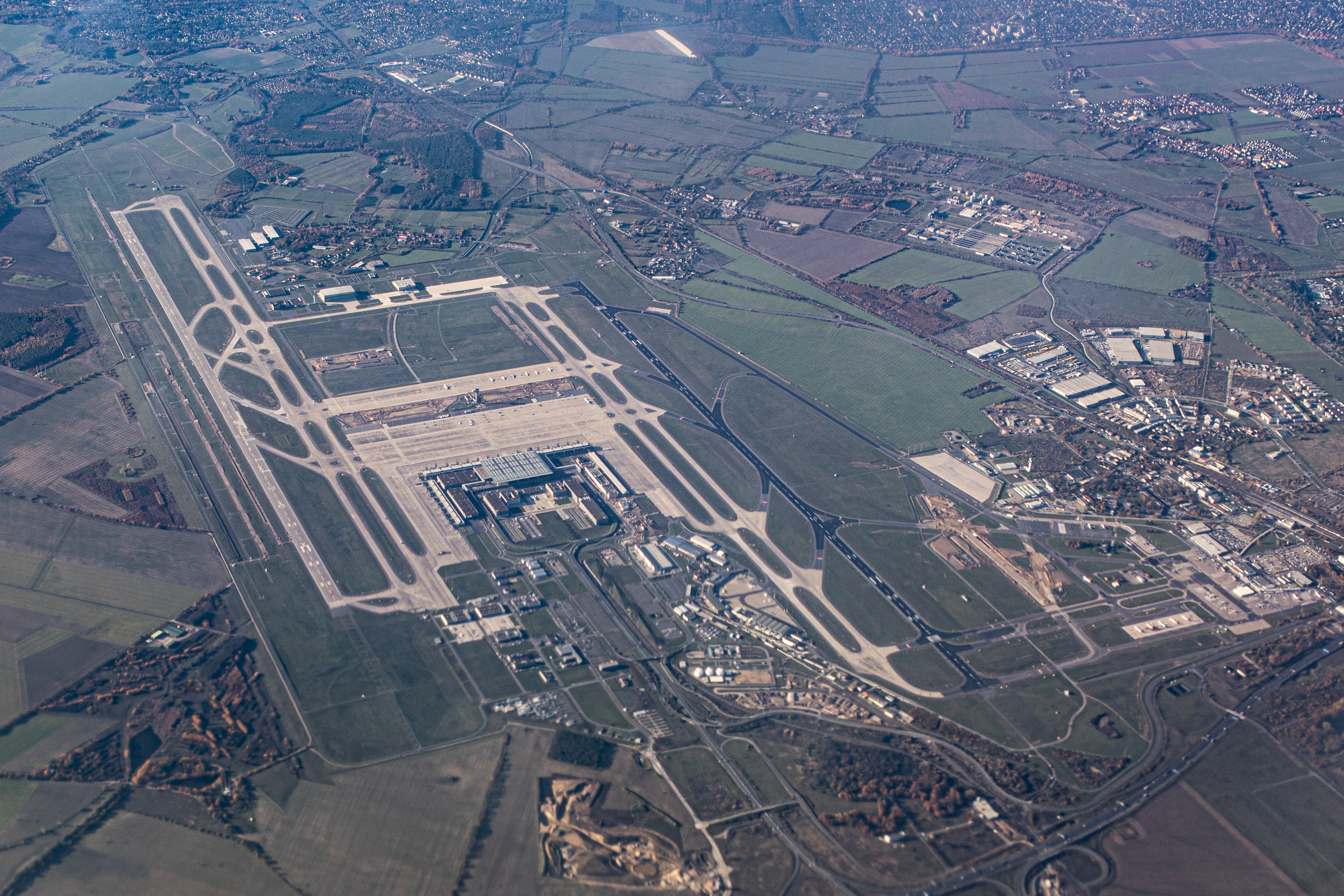
Aerial view

Berlin Brandenburg Airport has two parallel runways. With a spacing of 1,900 metres (6,200 ft), they allow simultaneous instrument approaches.

The northern runway of BER is the southern runway of the old Schönefeld Airport and has been in use since the 1960s. To adapt it for the new airport, it has been renovated and lengthened from 3,000 to 3,600 metres (9,800 to 12,000 ft). The newly built southern runway has a length of 4,000 metres (13,000 ft) and was officially commissioned on 31 May 2012. Blackouts of the runway beacon of the southern runway led to investigations concerning air traffic safety.

BER covers 1,470 hectares (3,632 acres) of land.

On 3 October 2024, the two runways received new designations due to shifts in the Earth's magnetic field. Runway 07L/25R changed to 06L/24R, runway 07R/25L to 06R/24L.

=== Air traffic control ===
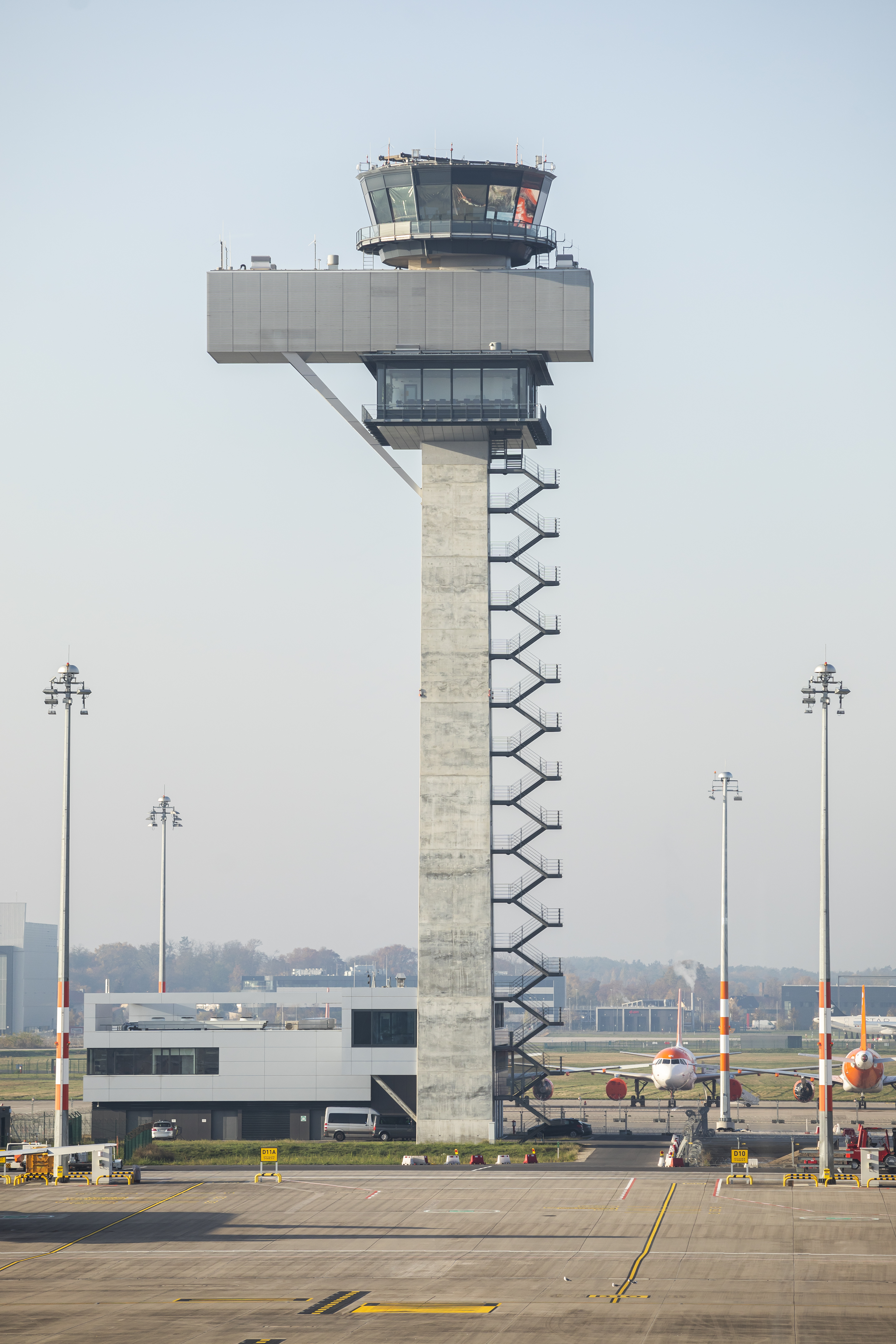
Air traffic control tower

Deutsche Flugsicherung is responsible for air traffic control and apron control at Berlin Brandenburg Airport. At 72 metres (240 ft), the control tower is the third highest in Germany (only surpassed by the control towers at Munich Airport and Düsseldorf Airport). On 25 March 2012, the new tower opened replacing the one at Schönefeld. Technical control (power supply and IT) went into operation on 16 March 2018.

=== Cargo and general aviation ===
The initial module of the midfield cargo facilities has a capacity of 60 thousand tonnes (130 million pounds) of cargo per year. With the completion of all planned expansions this could handle up to 600 thousand tonnes (1.3 billion pounds) per year. The general aviation terminal is located in the northern part of BER.

=== Airport tourism facilities ===
The Infotower was a 32-metre (105 ft) observation tower located adjacent to the northern cargo terminal that included a museum and a gift shop. It was closed and demolished in 2016. FBB also offers guided tours of the airport which have grown in popularity since the delayed opening.

=== Aircraft maintenance ===
The two large hangars at BER were to be used by Lufthansa and Air Berlin respectively. However, Air Berlin have ceased operations as of 28 October 2017. Both provide enough space for maintenance work on four to five narrow-body aircraft.

=== Government use ===
The Executive Transport Wing of the German Defence Ministry (Flugbereitschaft), responsible for government flights, will move large parts of its operations to Berlin Brandenburg Airport from its still-current base at Cologne Bonn Airport near the former West German capital Bonn. However Cologne/Bonn will remain the home base of the government fleet for the time being.

The Institute for Federal Real Estate has been planning to construct a terminal on the northern edge of the airport for use by government officials and to welcome foreign dignitaries during state visits. The former Terminal A of Schönefeld Airport was planned to serve as an interim terminal until the new building was to be finished. However, in March 2016 the management of the airport terminated the contract with the German government that guaranteed usage of Terminal A of Schönefeld Airport upon the completion of BER for the area to be used for a different purpose. The termination was disputed between airport officials and the German Federal Ministry of Transport and Digital Infrastructure.

Mühlenfeld suggested a provisional ramp area west of Schönefeld's main terminal as a replacement solution and construction site for an interim government terminal at the end of February 2016. This then supposed interim government terminal was finished at a cost of around €70 million while the permanent government terminal was planned to begin operations around 2025, at a cost of additionally around €344 million, which left its completion in doubt. In December 2019, the German government cancelled all plans to construct a more representative facility until at least 2030.

The government terminal was inaugurated and put in use on 21 October 2020.

=== Operating hours ===
Noise abatement regulations in the airport's operating licence prohibit takeoffs and landings between 00:00 and 05:00. The Federal Administrative Court of Germany rejected a lawsuit by residents to extend this night flight ban from 23:00 to 06:00 on 13 October 2011. It was also ruled that affected residents should be provided with additional noise insulation.

=== Major operators ===
Until its demise, Air Berlin had planned to move its primary hub from Tegel to Berlin Brandenburg. As a member of the Oneworld airline alliance, Air Berlin required airport facilities capable of meeting the demands of its connecting passengers that Tegel could not provide. However, Air Berlin filed for insolvency on 15 August 2017 and large parts of it were bought by Lufthansa, Germany's largest airline, ahead of its collapse on the 27th of that month. The airport leadership declared in September 2017 that the bankruptcy of Air Berlin would have had no imminent impact on the expected traffic volume at the new airport as several of Air Berlin's routes had been taken over by other airlines, e.g., easyJet.

Prior to the COVID-19 pandemic in early 2020, easyJet was due to become the overall largest airline at the airport in terms of routes served, ahead of Ryanair. In May 2019, Ryanair announced that they would not move to the new facilities, and would keep using the old building at the side of Berlin Schönefeld Airport, which has now become part of Berlin Brandenburg Airport as its Terminal 5. As of 2021, Ryanair remained in the new main building because Terminal 5 was closed for the foreseeable future. In 2022, Ryanair moved to Terminal 2.

Lufthansa does not use Berlin Brandenburg Airport as a hub. By 2011, they planned to greatly expand its presence in Berlin. At its former facilities at Tegel Airport the airline added several European destinations which have all since ceased or were turned over to Eurowings.

Furthermore, the airlines Condor and Sundair operate bases at the airport.

In summer 2020 and due to the COVID-19 pandemic, eight originally schedules destinations in the US, Asia, and the Middle East could not be served. Some routes, such as to Singapore with Scoot, have since resumed. In 2021, the airport authority sought to establish 25 long-haul routes from Berlin by 2025 including negotiations for a revised bilateral agreement to allow Emirates to serve a fifth German city. United Airlines announced its return to Berlin with a service to Newark, which already had been served from Tegel, as well as a new route to Washington, D.C., in 2023. In July 2022, Delta Air Lines announced its 2023 return to Berlin with a service to New York–Kennedy. Currently this is a seasonal connection, only in the summer flight schedule.

=== Projected passenger volume and expansion plans ===
Since German reunification, air traffic in Berlin has increased greatly. In 1991, the combined passenger volume of the city's airports was 7.9 million per year. By 2014, this number had risen to 28 million. By Berlin Brandenburg's opening, it was projected to have a capacity of 27 million passengers per year. There were concerns that the airport could have insufficient capacity upon opening and plans were already in place for expansion. It may be expanded by up to two satellite concourses, bringing the terminal capacity to 45 million with runways capable of accommodating 50 million passengers per year. The two satellites located on the apron parallel to the main pier and linked by tunnel, are included in the construction permit of Berlin Brandenburg Airport. This means they could be built at any time without further regulatory hurdles or the possibility of third-party objections. A possible third runway could be located in the south, though no such plans exist to date.

It was planned to build a Terminal 3 next to Terminal 2 by 2029. This plan was delayed because of the COVID-19 pandemic.

== Airlines and destinations ==
=== Passenger ===
The following airlines offer regular scheduled and charter flights at Berlin Brandenburg Airport:

| Airlines | Destinations |
|---|---|
| Aegean Airlines | Athens, Thessaloniki |
| Aer Lingus | Dublin |
| Air Algérie | Algiers |
| Air Cairo | Hurghada; Seasonal: Sharm El Sheikh |
| Air Canada | Seasonal: Montréal–Trudeau |
| Air France | Paris–Charles de Gaulle |
| Air Mediterranean | Athens |
| Air Serbia | Belgrade |
| Air Uniqon (operated by Avanti Air) | Friedrichshafen; Seasonal: Sylt |
| airBaltic | Riga, Tallinn, Seasonal: Kuusamo (begins 12 December 2026) |
| AJet | Ankara; Seasonal: Bodrum |
| Austrian Airlines | Vienna |
| Azerbaijan Airlines | Baku |
| BlueBird Airways | Tel Aviv |
| British Airways | London–City, London–Heathrow |
| Brussels Airlines | Brussels |
| Bulgaria Air | Sofia |
| Condor | Abu Dhabi, Frankfurt; Seasonal: Heraklion, Hurghada, Kos, Rhodes |
| Corendon Airlines | Seasonal: Antalya, Heraklion, Hurghada |
| Croatia Airlines | Zagreb; Seasonal: Split |
| DAT | Saarbrücken |
| Delta Air Lines | Seasonal: New York–JFK |
| easyJet | Agadir, Barcelona, Basel/Mulhouse, Birmingham, Bordeaux, Bristol, Catania, Copenhagen, Edinburgh, Fuerteventura, Funchal, Geneva, Gran Canaria, Larnaca, Liverpool, Ljubljana (resumes 7 April 2027), London–Gatwick, London–Southend, Lyon, Málaga, Manchester, Milan–Linate, Nantes, Nice, Palma de Mallorca, Paris–Charles de Gaulle, Pristina, Rome–Fiumicino, Tenerife–South, Thessaloniki, Valencia, Venice, Zurich; Seasonal: Antalya, Chania, Corfu, Giza, Glasgow, Heraklion, Hurghada, Kos, La Palma, Marsa Alam, Milan–Malpensa, Naples, Olbia, Pisa, Porto, Preveza/Lefkada, Pula, Rhodes, Rimini (begins 16 April 2027), Rovaniemi, Seville, Sharm El Sheikh, Split, Tivat, Tromsø |
| EgyptAir | Cairo |
| El Al | Tel Aviv |
| Eurowings | Beirut, Bologna, Cologne/Bonn, Dubai–Al Maktoum, Düsseldorf, Erbil, Faro, Gothenburg, Graz, Helsinki, Jeddah, Lisbon, Málaga, London–Heathrow, Palma de Mallorca, Porto, Rome–Fiumicino, Salzburg, Sarajevo, Stockholm–Arlanda, Stuttgart, Yerevan, Zurich; Seasonal: Abu Dhabi, Baghdad (begins 10 December 2026), Bastia, Bilbao, Corfu, Dubai–International, Dubrovnik, Fuerteventura, Heraklion, Hurghada, Ibiza, Jerez de la Frontera, Kavala, Kuusamo (begins 20 December 2026), Kittilä, Kos, Lanzarote, Larnaca, Marsa Alam, Naples, Newcastle upon Tyne, Olbia, Nice, Rhodes, Rovaniemi, Split, Tivat, Tromsø, Zakynthos |
| Finnair | Helsinki |
| FlyErbil | Erbil |
| Flynas | Jeddah |
| FlyOne | Chișinău |
| Freebird Airlines | Seasonal: Antalya |
| Georgian Airways | Tbilisi |
| Hainan Airlines | Beijing–Capital |
| Iberia | Madrid |
| Icelandair | Reykjavík–Keflavík |
| Iraqi Airways | Baghdad, Erbil |
| Israir | Tel Aviv |
| Jet2.com | Seasonal: Bristol, East Midlands, Glasgow, Leeds/Bradford, Manchester, Newcastle upon Tyne |
| KLM | Amsterdam |
| KM Malta Airlines | Malta |
| LOT Polish Airlines | Warsaw–Chopin |
| Lufthansa | Frankfurt, Munich |
| Lufthansa City Airlines | Frankfurt, Munich |
| Luxair | Luxembourg |
| Marabu | Seasonal: Hurghada |
| Middle East Airlines | Beirut |
| Norwegian Air Shuttle | Bergen, Copenhagen, Oslo, Stockholm–Arlanda; Seasonal: Tromsø |
| Nouvelair | Monastir, Tunis; Seasonal: Djerba |
| Pegasus Airlines | Istanbul–Sabiha Gökçen; Seasonal: Antalya, Adana/Mersin, Gaziantep, Samsun |
| Qatar Airways | Doha |
| Royal Jordanian | Amman–Queen Alia |
| Ryanair | Alicante, Barcelona, Bari, Bergamo, Birmingham, Bucharest–Otopeni, Budapest, Catania, Dublin, East Midlands, Edinburgh, Faro, Gran Canaria, Lisbon, London–Stansted, Madrid, Málaga, Manchester, Marrakesh, Milan–Malpensa, Palma de Mallorca, Paphos, Porto, Rome–Fiumicino, Sofia, Tenerife–South,Valencia, Seasonal: Athens, Corfu, Heraklion, Ibiza, Kos, Rhodes, Zadar |
| Scandinavian Airlines | Copenhagen, Stockholm–Arlanda; Seasonal: Oslo |
| Sky Alps | Bolzano |
| Sky Express | Athens |
| Southwind Airlines | Seasonal charter: Antalya |
| Sundair | Beirut, Damascus, Seasonal: Burgas, Gran Canaria, Heraklion, Kos, Monastir, Palma de Mallorca, Tenerife–South, Varna |
| SunExpress | Antalya, Gaziantep, Izmir; Seasonal: Adana/Mersin, Ankara, Bodrum, Dalaman, Diyarbakir Kayseri |
| Swiss International Air Lines | Geneva, Zurich |
| Syrian Airlines | Damascus |
| TAP Air Portugal | Lisbon |
| Transavia | Paris–Orly; Seasonal: Agadir, Marrakesh, Nantes |
| Turkish Airlines | Istanbul |
| United Airlines | Newark |
| Volotea | Seasonal: Florence |
| Vueling | Barcelona |
| Wizz Air | Belgrade, Bratislava, Bucharest–Otopeni, Budapest, Chișinău, Cluj-Napoca, Kutaisi, Milan-Malpensa (begins 14 December 2026), Pristina (begins 14 December 2026), Sarajevo (begins 3 December 2026), Skopje, Sofia, Suceava (begins 17 December 2026), Tirana, Tuzla (ends 8 January 2027), Varna Vilnius |

=== Cargo ===
| Airlines | Destinations |
|---|---|
| ASL Airlines France | Paris–Charles de Gaulle |
| FedEx Express | Paris–Charles de Gaulle |
| Singapore Airlines Cargo | Amsterdam, Brussels, Frankfurt, Munich |
| UPS Airlines | Cologne/Bonn, Gdańsk |

== Statistics ==
=== Annual traffic ===
In 2019, the two Berlin operational airports together served 35.6 million passengers, which sharply decreased to 9 million for 2020 in the wake of the COVID-19 pandemic. In 2021, Berlin Brandenburg Airport slightly increased that figure to 9.9 million passengers. In 2024, the airport served 25.5 million passengers.

Annual passenger traffic
| Year | Passengers | % change | Ref. |
|---|---|---|---|
| 2020 | 444,893 | — | |
| 2021 | 9,947,006 | ▲2,135.8% | |
| 2022 | 19,845,046 | ▲99.5% | |
| 2023 | 23,071,865 | ▲16.3% | |
| 2024 | 25,465,872 | ▲10.4% | |
| 2025 | 26,050,740 | ▲2% | |

=== Monthly traffic ===
Monthly passenger traffic
| Month | 2026 Pax | % | 2025 Pax | % | 2024 Pax | % | 2023 Pax | % | 2022 Pax | % | 2021 Pax | % |
|---|---|---|---|---|---|---|---|---|---|---|---|---|
| January | 1,550,880 | ▼-0.8% | 1,563,535 | ▲5.8% | 1,477,579 | ▲12.8% | 1,309,645 | ▲70.6% | 767,710 | ▲269.6% | 207,587 | ▼-90.8% |
| February | 1,631,825 | ▼-4.7% | 1,713,150 | ▲8.9% | 1,572,985 | ▲10.9% | 1,418,368 | ▲48.9% | 952,663 | ▲548.6% | 146,945 | ▼-93.6% |
| March | 1,977,367 | ▲1.2% | 1,954,301 | ▲1.7% | 1,921,062 | ▲15.0% | 1,670,091 | ▲28.3% | 1,301,449 | ▲490.8% | 220,257 | ▼-78.7% |
| April | 2,136,870 | ▼-4.1% | 2,228,016 | ▲3.5% | 2,152,146 | ▲12.6% | 1,910,670 | ▲6.8% | 1,789,655 | ▲576.0% | 264,710 | ▲859.2% |
| May | 2,339,311 | ▲0.9% | 2,317,526 | ▼ -2.2% | 2,368,531 | ▲13.2% | 2,091,691 | ▲8.4% | 1,929,380 | ▲433.2% | 362,305 | ▲596.3% |
| June | 2,284,598 | -0.2% | 2,288,933 | ▼ -2.1% | 2,338,226 | ▲11.6% | 2,095,407 | ▲7.9% | 1,941,107 | ▲197.5% | 652,194 | ▲288.5% |
| July | 2.463,234 | 4.0% | 2,367,963 | ▲0.3% | 2,362,051 | ▲7.1% | 2,205,150 | ▲11.8% | 1,973,258 | ▲57.7% | 1,251,383 | ▲78.4% |
| August | 2.451,906 | -0.4% | 2,441,769 | ▲2.2% | 2,389,611 | ▲7.7% | 2,219,669 | ▲14.7% | 1,935,183 | ▲35.0% | 1,433,612 | ▲73.0% |
| September | | | 2,500,834 | ▲1.0% | 2,477,032 | ▲9.1% | 2,269,769 | ▲9.9% | 2,066,204 | ▲41.3% | 1,462,530 | ▲110.8% |
| October | | | 2,660,484 | ▲3.8% | 2,562,551 | ▲8.6% | 2,359,832 | ▲12.3% | 2,100,789 | ▲25.6% | 1,672,009 | ▲187.6% |
| November | | | 2,009,641 | ▲5.7% | 1,901,705 | ▲8.4% | 1,754,461 | ▲12.5% | 1,559,578 | ▲28.1% | 1,217,142 | ▲472.0% |
| December | | | 2,004,588 | ▲3% | 1,942,393 | ▲9.9% | 1,767,112 | ▲15.6% | 1,529,138 | ▲44.8% | 1,056,221 | ▲298.6% |
| Year | 9,636,253 | | 26,050,740 | ▲2% | 25,465,872 | ▲10.4% | 23,071,865 | ▲16.3% | 19,845,046 | ▲99.5% | 9,947,006 | ▲2,135.8% |

Data for 2019 (pre-pandemic year; closure of Berlin Schönefeld and Berlin Tegel airports). The data is taken from the official airport website.

Passenger traffic
| Month | Last 12 months | % Change | 2019 (pre-pandemic) |
|---|---|---|---|
| May 2025 | 2,317,526 | ▼-27.6% | 3,200,803 |
| June 2025 | 2,288,933 | ▼-29.8% | 3,261,495 |
| July 2025 | 2,367,963 | ▼-29.5% | 3,358,651 |
| August 2025 | 2,441,769 | ▼-23.2% | 3,180,931 |
| September 2025 | 2,500,834 | ▼-23.4% | 3,266,592 |
| October 2025 | 2,660,484 | ▼-17.7% | 3,233,026 |
| November 2025 | 2,009,641 | ▼-21.0% | 2,544,520 |
| December 2025 | 2,004,588 | ▼-23.1% | 2,606,366 |
| January 2026 | 1,550,880 | ▼-35.9% | 2,418,966 |
| February 2026 | 1,631,825 | ▼-35.7% | 2,537,951 |
| March 2026 | 1,977,367 | ▼-32.6% | 2,933,576 |
| April 2026 | 2,136,870 | ▼-31.1% | 3,102,128 |
| Total | 25,897,176 | ▼-25.2% | 34,635,005 |

=== Busiest routes ===
Busiest domestic routes from Berlin Brandenburg Airport (2023)
| Rank | Airport | Departing passengers | Change % |
|---|---|---|---|
| 1 | Frankfurt | 1,180,261 | ▲16.3 |
| 2 | Munich | 900,468 | ▲19.7 |
| 3 | Stuttgart | 349,595 | ▲29.0 |
| 4 | Düsseldorf | 264,393 | ▲21.3 |
| 5 | Cologne-Bonn | 252,813 | ▲0.1 |

Busiest European routes from Berlin Brandenburg Airport (2023)
| Rank | Airport | Departing passengers | Change % |
|---|---|---|---|
| 1 | Amsterdam | 811,041 | ▲19.6 |
| 2 | Palma de Mallorca | 779,767 | ▼-0.9 |
| 3 | Zurich | 756,743 | ▲10.3 |
| 4 | Paris-Charles de Gaulle | 715,768 | ▲11.3 |
| 5 | Istanbul | 597,287 | ▲14.3 |
| 6 | Vienna | 595,519 | ▲18.4 |
| 7 | Barcelona-El Prat | 537,236 | ▲20.4 |
| 8 | London-Heathrow | 536,754 | ▲40.8 |
| 9 | Madrid-Barajas | 457,386 | ▲6.9 |
| 10 | Copenhagen | 434,513 | ▲20.6 |

Busiest intercontinental routes from Berlin Brandenburg Airport (2023)
| Rank | Airport | Departing passengers | Change % |
|---|---|---|---|
| 1 | Antalya | 737,881 | ▲26.1 |
| 2 | Istanbul-Sabiha Gökçen | 416,657 | ▲18.6 |
| 3 | Doha | 344,482 | ▲78.8 |
| 4 | Tel Aviv | 308,561 | ▲2.7 |
| 5 | Hurghada | 221,613 | ▲21.6 |
| 6 | Izmir | 218,859 | ▲14.0 |
| 7 | New York-JFK | 141,459 | New |
| 8 | New York-Newark | 132,253 | ▲18.2 |
| 9 | Singapore-Changi | 85,958 | ▲8.1 |
| 10 | Cairo | 77,524 | New |

== Ground transportation ==
=== Rail ===
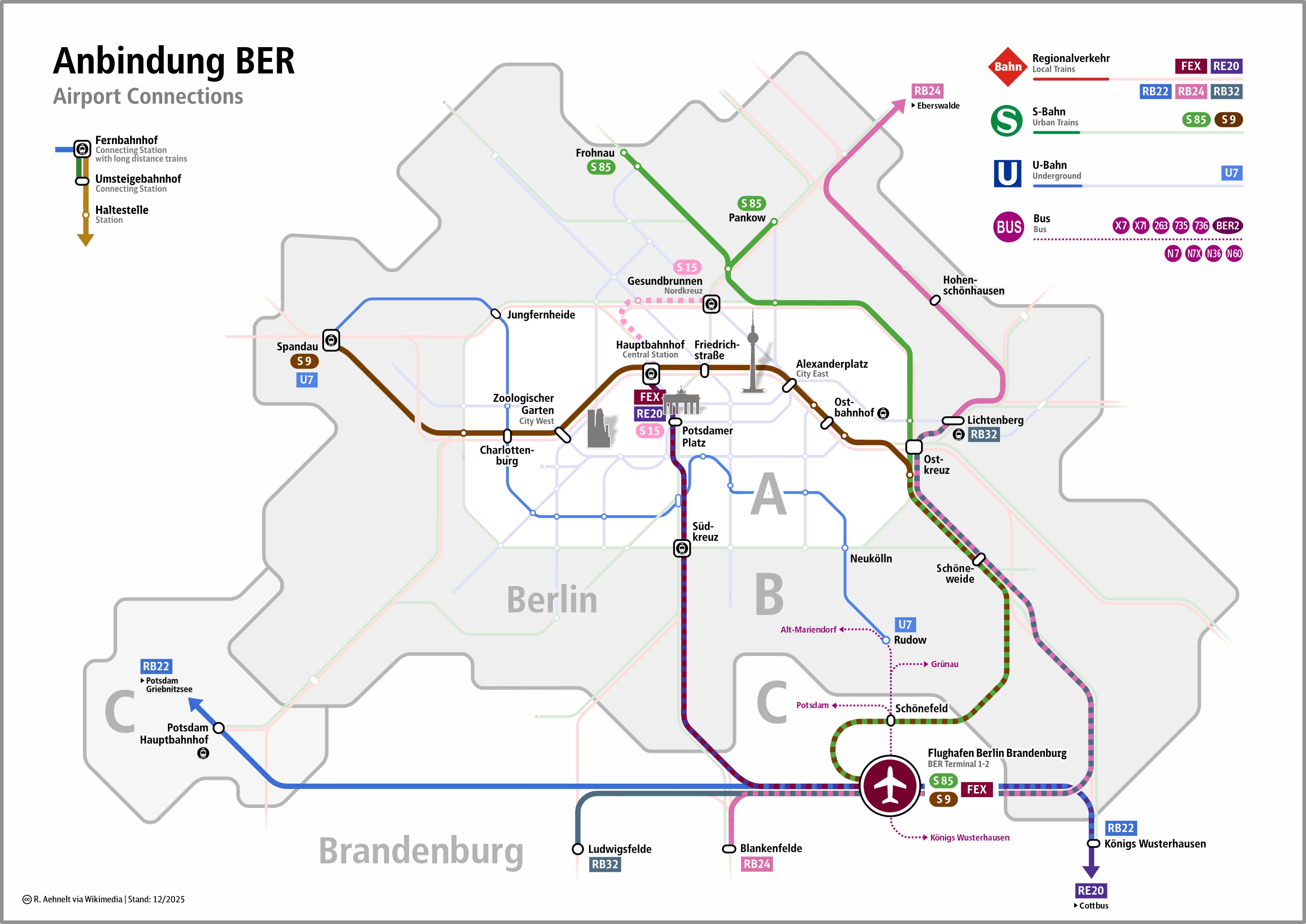
Map of railway connections at Berlin Brandenburg Airport. An express line (FEX) serves Berlin Hauptbahnhof in 22 minutes.

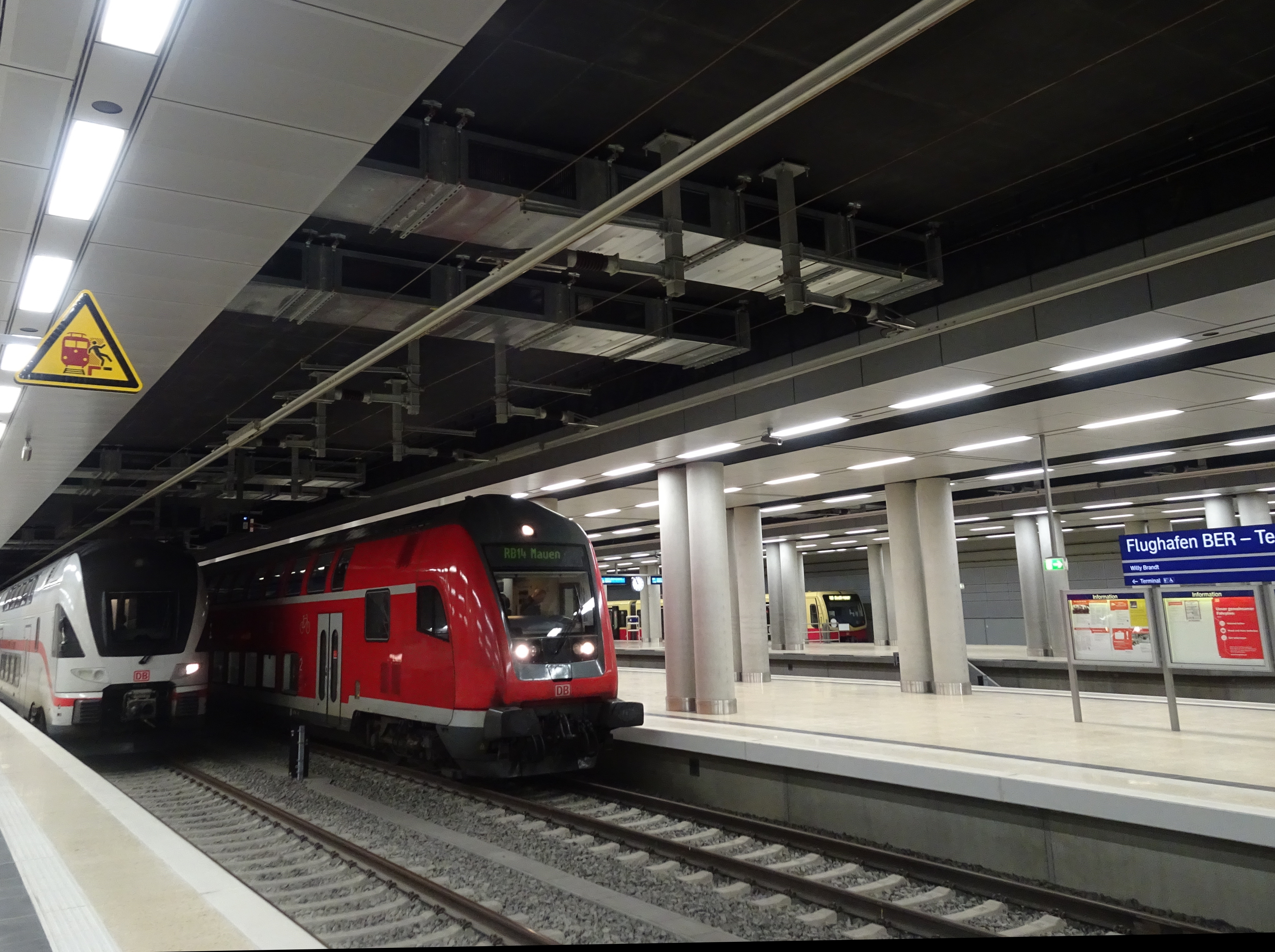
Interior of the BER Airport station

The terminal connects to a 3.1-kilometre (1.9 mi) east–west railway tunnel under the apron and the terminal complex. As the nine tunnel sections were the first structures to be built, they were constructed by conventional excavations.

BER Airport station is located directly beneath Terminal 1 and has six tracks. Two tracks are used by the S-Bahn, with lines S9 and S85 each serving the airport every 20 minutes. The remaining four tracks are used by Regional-Express and Airport Express (FEX), as well as long-distance trains, including InterCity.

InterCity trains run several times a day from the airport to Chemnitz, Dresden and Rostock via central Berlin.

More than half of passengers travel to and from BER by public transport.

The Airport Express (FEX) connects BER with Südkreuz, Potsdamer Platz and Berlin Hauptbahnhof, reaching the main station in about 23 minutes. The opening of the upgraded Berlin–Dresden railway in December 2025 has significantly shortened journey times between the airport and central Berlin.

Following the closure of Terminal 5, the airport's railway stations were renamed in December 2023, with Terminal 1-2 becoming BER Airport station and Terminal 5 becoming Schönefeld (bei Berlin) station.

==== Proposed expansions ====
===== U-Bahn =====
Line U7 terminates short of the airport (at Rudow) but there are plans to extend it towards the airport if and when funds become available. The issue is complicated by the fact that the line would have to cross the state border between Berlin and Brandenburg and it is unclear who would have to pay for which parts of construction operations and maintenance. While Berlin has many "ghost stations" built in preparation for potential future construction, there is no provision underneath the terminal building for a station.

=== Maglev ===
In 2020, the Berlin CDU proposed maglev connection to BER. The proposed system was the Transport System Bögl, developed by the Bavarian construction company Max Bögl. After they entered the Berlin state government in 2023, the use of maglev technology was considered again, with a possible connection between the airport and the International Congress Center. As of 2026, the proposed ICC–BER connection had not progressed beyond the discussion stage.

=== Road ===
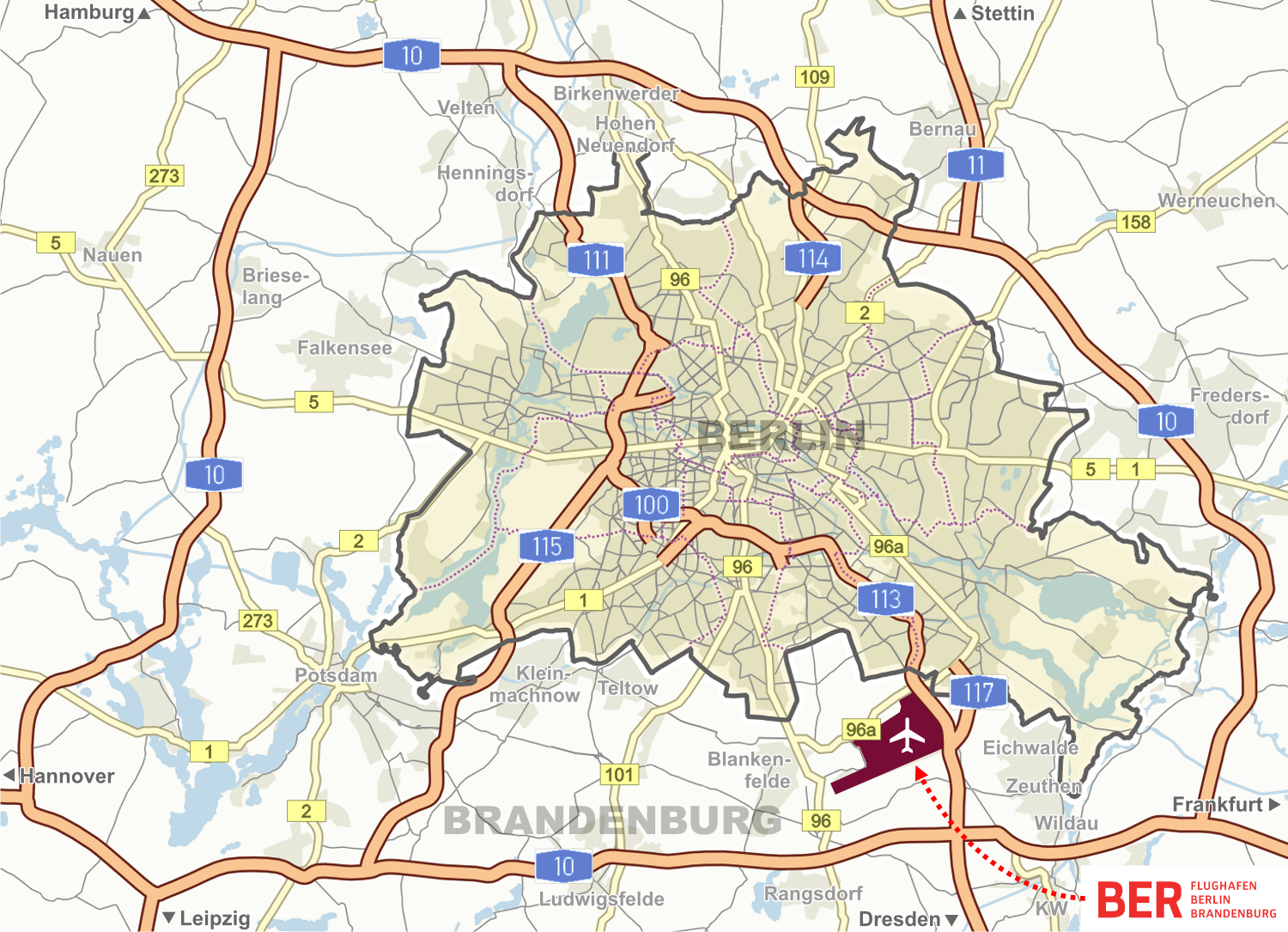
Map of motorways in Berlin

The airport is accessible by road via the A113 and the B96a. The A113 has a dedicated exit serving Terminals 1 - 2. The A113 connects the airport with central Berlin via the A100 and with the A10 Berlin ring, from which the A13 continues south towards Dresden.

More than 10,000 parking spaces are available in multi-storey and ground-level car parks. Short-stay area with around 300 spaces in front of Terminal 1 is provided for passenger pick-up and drop-off.

Dedicated car-sharing area is located at car park P4, while rental cars are collected and returned at the P2 multi-storey car park.

=== Bus ===
Public transport connections at the new airport include numerous bus services. BER is served by the express buses X7, X71 and X11. The X7 connects to the U7 subway at Rudow station. X71 connects the airport to Alt Mariendorf along the U6 via Rudow. The X11 bus continues to Lichterfelde-West and to Dahlem. There are also special express buses costing a surcharge dubbed "BER1" and "BER2" which connect the airport with Rathaus Steglitz and Potsdam main station respectively. Other bus lines also stop at a number of stations, providing connections with Berlin's public transport network and destinations in Brandenburg.

=== Bicycle ===
The access to the airport by bicycle is considered lacking by the local ADFC who demand a bicycle highway to the new airport. A reason cited for the lacking bicycle access is that the plans dating to 2006 made no such provision.

== Commercial and exposition area ==
=== Berlin Air Show (ILA) ===
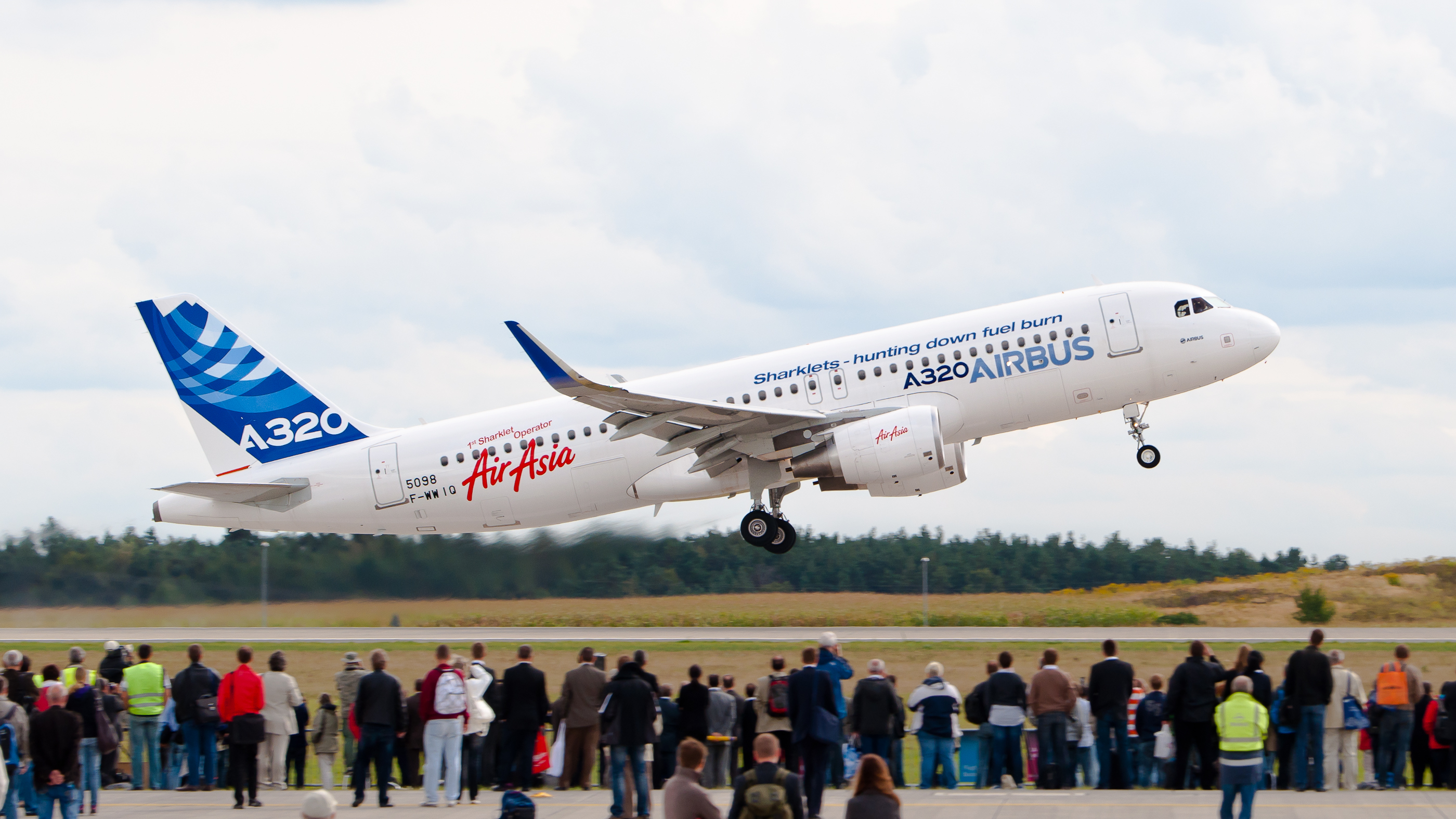
A flight display performed by an Airbus A320-200 at the Berlin Air Show

On 3 July 2012, the Berlin ExpoCenter Airport opened on the southeastern portion of the airport grounds. Messe Berlin operates the 250,000 square metres (2,700,000 sq ft) exposition facility that is primarily intended as the site of the biennial ILA Berlin Air Show.

=== Airport Information Centre ===
Coinciding with groundbreaking for construction of the new airport, an information and public relations centre called airportworld opened near the old Schönefeld Airport. On 14 November 2007, the Infotower, a 32-metre-high (105 ft) public viewing tower containing an exhibition about the new airport opened on the BER construction site.

=== Business park ===
The area surrounding BER is zoned as a commercial district. Plans call for the construction of shopping centres and parking structures as well as industrial, commercial and office spaces. Situated at the terminal complex will be the BER Airport City with an area of 16 hectares (40 acres). Marketing of the real estate began in autumn 2006 and beginning in 2009 offices, hotels, car rentals, four car parks with a capacity of 10,000, restaurants and retail spaces were built here.

To the north is the BER Business Park Berlin with a planned area of 109 hectares (270 acres) for industrial and commercial use as well as congress centers. A further Business Park North was proposed as a future use of the area of the old Schönefeld terminal. However, those plans were put on hold in view of the decision to incorporate the terminal into the new airport.

== Controversies ==
In September 2010, Deutsche Flugsicherung published aircraft arrival and departure routes for Berlin Brandenburg Airport which significantly differ from earlier ones used in the court decision for the construction permit. In the original maps, aircraft were expected to take off and land in a path parallel with the runway. The new plans saw flight paths that deviate from the runway direction by 15 degrees. Therefore, aircraft would now fly over areas in southern Berlin (Lichtenrade, Steglitz and Zehlendorf) and adjacent Brandenburg (Teltow, Stahnsdorf, Kleinmachnow and Potsdam) to the surprise of local residents. This prompted a wave of protests and a lawsuit that the courts rejected.

Both the expansion of Schönefeld Airport into BER and the quality of the connection to the railway network are the subject of public debate. The Bürgerverein Brandenburg-Berlin e.V. represents local residents who protest an expansion of air traffic to and from the south of Berlin. Also, traffic and environmental experts denounce the late completion dates for the fast connection to the Berlin Hauptbahnhof. Still, Berlin Hauptbahnhof was only a 30-minute journey with trains departing every 15 minutes after inauguration. At the time of the originally planned opening date of BER, in 2011, this was expected to be reduced to 20 minutes after reconstruction of the Berlin section of the Berlin–Dresden railway, which was planned to be finished by 2020. However, delays in both the BER construction and the construction of the railway meant that the travel time was 30 minutes until December 2025.

In 2015, a whistleblower alleged that Imtech, which filed for bankruptcy in 2015, had bribed airport officials to receive inflated payments for their work. Prosecutors in Brandenburg launched a probe into the allegations. In May 2016, it emerged that the whistleblower had been poisoned with a "deadly substance" but survived after a three-month period of illness.

== See also ==
- List of airports in Germany
- List of the busiest airports in Germany
- List of transport megaprojects
- Megaproject
- Transport in Germany
