= Battle of Langensalza (1075) =

Victory of Henry IV over Saxon nobles

- Part of the Saxon rebellion
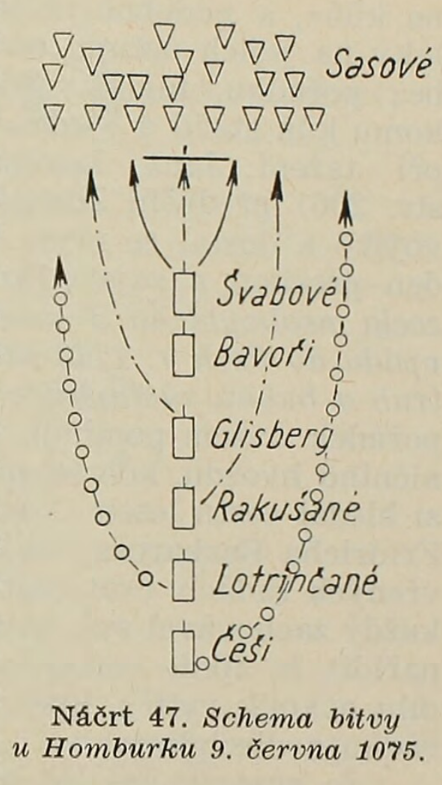
- Plan of the attack during the battle of Langensalza (made by Czech military historian Otakar Frankenberger, c. 1938)
Date	9 June 1075
Location	Homburg an der Unstrut, Langensalza, Thuringia
Result	Imperial victory

Belligerents
Holy Roman Empire	Duchy of Saxony

Commanders and leaders
Henry IV of Germany; Rudolf of Rheinfelden; Vratislaus II of Bohemia; Ernst of Austria †; Theodoric II of Lorraine; Godfrey IV of Lower Lorraine	Otto of Nordheim; Burchard II of Halberstadt; Magnus of Saxony; Lothair Udo II of the Nordmark

Strength
25,000	7,000

Casualties and losses
2,765	5,860

The First Battle of Langensalza was fought on 9 June 1075 between forces of King Henry IV of Germany and several rebellious Saxon noblemen on the River Unstrut near Langensalza in Thuringia. The battle was a complete success for Henry, resulting in the subjugation of the Saxons shortly before the Investiture Controversy commenced. In Germany the battle is known as the Schlacht bei Homburg an der Unstrut, after a nearby Kaiserpfalz and monastery.

== Background ==
The Salian king Henry IV had inherited the quarrels with the Saxons from his father Emperor Henry III, whose long and costly sojournments at the Imperial Palace of Goslar had annoyed the local nobles. From the start of his reign in 1065, 15-year-old Henry IV suffered numerous setbacks enforcing his Imperial authority in Saxony after the regency of his mother Agnes of Poitou. Attempts to restore the rights over the Harz forests were not received well by the Saxon freedmen, and efforts to extend the crownlands in general as well as the increased demands laid upon the fisc were opposed. A policy of building castles and supplying them with loyal, mainly Swabian officials, continued from the time of his father, fostered resentment among multiple groups. In particular, the large Harzburg became a symbol of Imperial tyranny and was seen as impeding on traditional Saxon rights. Like his father, Henry desired to set Goslar as the fixed capital of the German Kingdom.

In 1070/71 Henry had already picked a quarrel with the Saxon count Otto of Nordheim, then Duke of Bavaria, and Magnus Billung, son of Duke Ordulf of Saxony. The king seized Otto's title and property and kept Magnus prisoner at Harzburg Castle, even after the latter succeeded his father to the Saxon duchy in 1072. This heightened tensions between the Imperial court and the Saxons; Magnus' subsequent release in exchange for seventy Swabians captured in Lüneburg did little to encourage a thaw in relations. In anger, the king rejected several Saxon petitions for redress.

In 1073 several bishops and princes organized a resistance. Several castles were besieged, and the King was forced to escape from the Harzburg to Hessewech. In February 1074 he proceeded to Gerstungen, where the insurrection, numbering twice the size of his forces, met him; he agreed to several concessions, reasoning that the Saxons would break their end of the deal eventually. The freedmen, who felt betrayed by the nobles due to the peace treaty, sacked the Harzburg in a frenzy, destroyed the castle, and committed such acts of sacrilege (tossing the bones of members of the royal family, along with those of an abbot and St. Anastasius) that they shocked the local population and the religious authorities. Henry used the destruction as a pretext for renewed hostilities. He gained the support of several bishops, the lower feudality and city burghers. While Henry was conducting a campaign against the Magyars on the one hand, papal legates were attempting to create support for the Saxon rebels on the other. In 1075 Otto of Nordheim, together with the count palatine in Saxony and Bishop Burckhard II of Halberstadt openly declared their hostility, using Henry's violations of the Treaty of Gerstungen as an excuse. They gained many Saxon and Thuringian freedmen, but many nobles and peasants did not join.

The King made camp in Bredingen, and managed to gain the defections of some lower Saxon nobles with promises to listen to their grievances. In June, he moved to Langensalza.

== Battle ==
Henry's move to Langensalza put him closer to the Saxon encampment. The two sides met for battle at Homburg on 9 June.

The Saxon army contained several thousand men, but in typical Saxon tradition, most of them were on foot. Their ranks consisted of nobles and their vassals, along with freedmen and some serfs. Many of them were poorly trained, described by their opponent as "an inept rabble accustomed to agriculture rather than military service, who, compelled not by a military spirit but by fear of their leaders, had entered battle contrary to their customs and traditions.".

Henry IV's army advanced in five ranks, despite the open terrain south of the River Unstrut. The Saxons rushed out of their castle at Homburg all on horseback, apparently leaving their foot soldiery behind in their haste.

The engagement that followed was less of a battle than a rout. A charge by the Swabians under Duke Rudolf almost instantly destroyed the Saxon centre. The Saxon leaders took to their horses and fled, but the foot soldiers were slaughtered. It was reported that several thousand died when they drowned in the Unstrut. Many spoils were gained by Henry's army.

== Aftermath ==
The defeat was stunning. It shocked the Saxons, and the supporters of the rebellion became frantic. The Archbishop of Mainz threatened excommunication against the Thuringians in order to gain funds to finance the insurrection. Unfortunately, Henry and his army ravaged the Saxon and Thuringian countryside, bringing starvation. The Archbishop of Magdeburg eventually conceded and requested the terms to which the King would hold the rebels. Henry demanded a short imprisonment for all the leaders, as well as confiscation of their fiefs and their redistribution among loyal Imperial partisans. As harsh as the terms were, the complete victory Henry gained at Langensalza convinced them to accept. In a humiliating gesture, the rebel bishops, nobles and peasants walked barefoot between the ranks of the King's army and submitted to him. The King then convened a meeting of princes at Goslar on Christmas to determine the future of Saxony; he ended up freeing Otto of Nordheim and making him his viceroy to Saxony. Henry considered the Saxon question settled, but the Investiture conflict would quickly undo the peace.

== Sources ==
Haverkamp, Alfred. Medieval Germany 1056-1273 (Oxford University Press, 1988)

Thompson, James (1928). Feudal Germany. ISBN 0-404-18601-7
