= Harzburg =

Imperial castle in Lower Saxony, Germany

- Große Harzburg
- Bad Harzburg, Lower Saxony
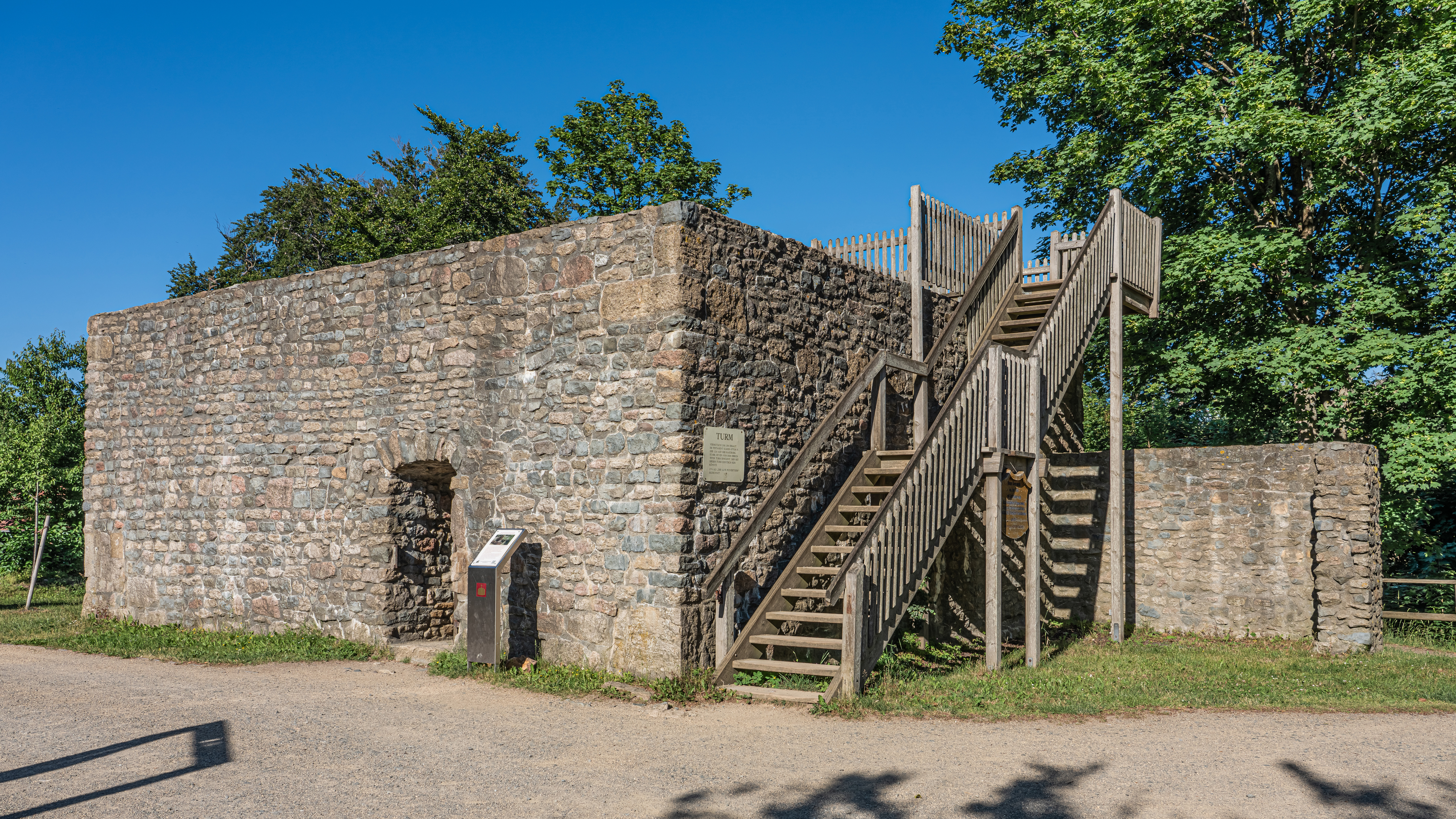
- Reconstruction of foundation walls of a tower

Site information
- Type: Hilltop castle
- Code: DE-NI
- Condition: Wall remnants, ditch

Location
- Coordinates: 51.87139°N 10.5675°E
- Height: 482 m above sea level (NN)

Site history
- Built: 1065 to 1068

Garrison information
- Occupants: King, emperor

The Harzburg, also called Große Harzburg ("Great Harz Castle"), is a former imperial castle, situated on the northwestern edge of the Harz mountain range overlooking the spa resort of Bad Harzburg in Goslar District in the state of Lower Saxony, Germany. It was erected from 1065 to 1068 at the behest of King Henry IV of Germany, slighted during the Saxon Rebellion in 1073-75, and a century later rebuilt under Emperor Frederick Barbarossa and his Welf successor Otto IV, who died here in 1218.

Later used as a robber baron's lair, the hill castle crumbled into ruins over the centuries. Today it has almost completely disappeared; only fragments of the foundation walls and the towers together with the castle well are preserved.

== Etymology ==
Mentioned as Hartesburg in a 1071 deed, the name of the castle (German: Burg) is derived from the Harz mountain range, called Hart in Middle Low German, and is probably affiliated with hardt meaning "mountain forest". Therefore, Harzburg can be translated as "Harz Castle".

== Location ==
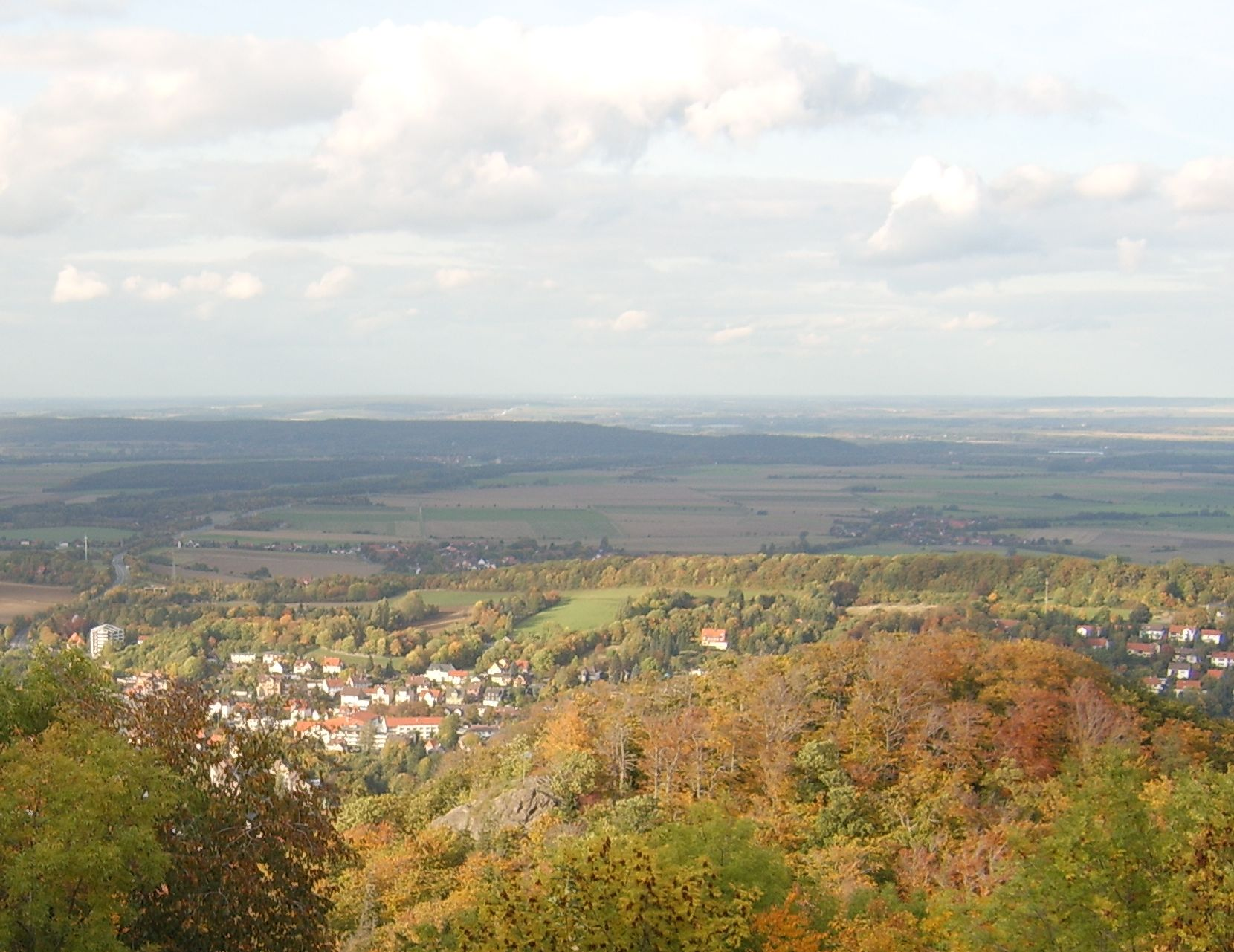
View from the Großer Burgberg

The ruins of the Große Harzburg are located above the spa town and the Radau valley, on the top of the Großer Burgberg hill at a height of 482.80 metres (1,584.0 ft). The summit can be reached by the Burgberg Cable Car and has an outstanding view past the neighbouring summit of Kleiner Burgberg (436.50 m (1,432.1 ft)) in the northwest over the northern Harz Foreland with the Harly hill range and far into the North German Plain. Southwards, the view goes over the densely forested mountains of the Harz National Park up to the Brocken massif.

The remains of the walls on the Großer Burgberg summit are open to the public. The layout of the castle and its remnants are explained on information boards at the site. It had two different bergfrieds; the square one has been partially rebuilt in modern times (see photo). One interesting feature is the wide moat driven through the rock that separates the castle complex into an east and a west wing, linked by a modern stone bridge. The castle well drew drinking water from the nearby Sachsenbrunnen, an enclosed spring in the woods. In medieval times, the water was transferred over several hundred metres in wooden pipes.

The viewpoint on the northern edge of the castle plateau is marked by the 19 m (62 ft) high Canossa Column, erected in 1877 during the German Kulturkampf conflict in honour of Chancellor Otto von Bismarck on the 800th anniversary of King Henry's Walk to Canossa. In addition, the former castle grounds comprise the more than two-hundred-year-old Bismarck Elm, a Harz folktales memorial hall erected from 1928 to 1932, a modern statue of the alleged pagan god Krodo, as well as a restaurant.

To the north, on the nearby hill of Kleiner Burgberg, are the remains of the so-called Kleine Harzburg ("Little Harz Castle") outlook, and to the east on the nearby Sachsenberg are the traces of a rampart, possibly constructed by the rebellious Saxons to besiege the Große Harzburg (see below).

== History ==
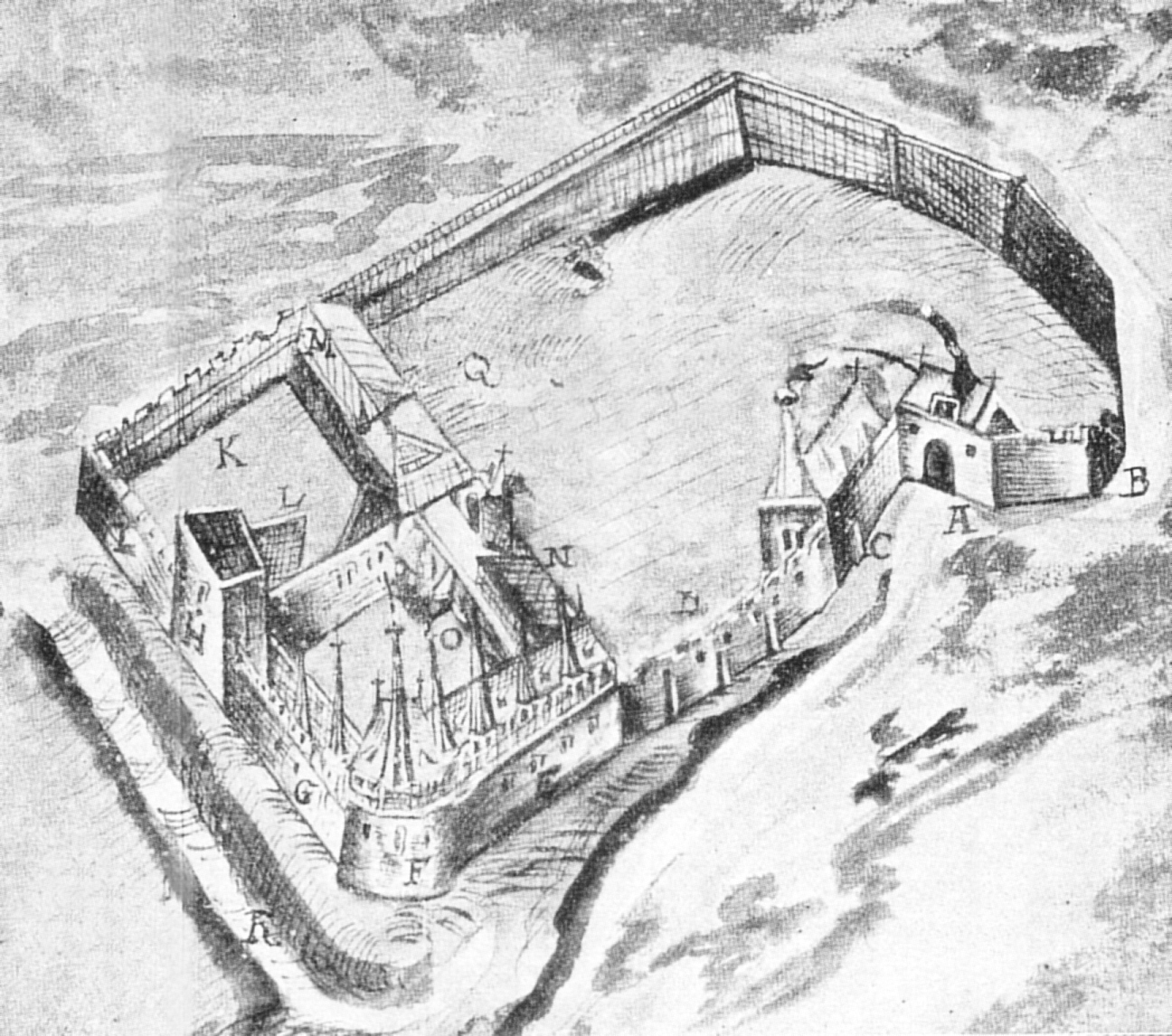
1574 drawing of the castle. Key: A = entrance, B = sharp angle, C = chapel, E = residence, F = outer ward, G = house on the Harnisch Chamber, H = old powder tower, I, K, L = walls, M = old brewery, N = offices, P = old kitchen, Q = Krodo Holl, R = moat

Already in 924/926 King Henry the Fowler had reached an armistice with the Hungarian invaders at nearby Werla Castle. In the 11th century, the Salian emperor Henry III had made the Imperial Palace of Goslar one of his favourite residences. He did, however, arouse the disfavour of the local Saxon nobility and the Billung dukes, not only by his Franconian descendance, but also due to the expensive maintaining of his Imperial court. Henry III died in 1056 at Bodfeld Castle and when his son King Henry IV, came of age in 1065, he soon renewed the Saxon conflict laying claim to several domains around the Harz mountains.

=== Henry IV ===
During Henry's minority and the regency of his mother Agnes of Poitou, the Saxon nobles had strengthened their position. The local count Otto of Nordheim, Duke of Bavaria since 1061, had even been involved in Henry's abduction during the 1062 Coup of Kaiserswerth. In turn, the Große Harzburg (Hartesburg) was erected during a large-scale castle building programme in the Duchy of Saxony from 1065 to 1068. Intended as a demonstration of power in the Saxon mainland, the extended complex was strategically sited by King Henry's architect Bishop Benno II of Osnabrück providing protection for the nearby Goslar imperial palace and the mines of Rammelsberg. Its walls extend right up to the steep face of the conical hilltop. At the time it was built the castle was impregnable.

Despite its defensive strength, the castle was also especially palatial. For example, it contained, amongst other things, unusually large, three-roomed great hall and collegiate church, to which Henry had many relics transferred. He even had a sort of family vault built, in which he laid the mortal remains of his brother, Duke Conrad II of Bavaria and his son, Henry, both of whom died young.

According to the chronicler Lambert of Hersfeld, the Saxon Rebellion broke out when on 29 June 1073 several nobles marched against the king residing in the Imperial Palace of Goslar. Henry had to flee along with the Imperial Regalia into the walls of the Harzburg. The besieging forces led by Otto of Nordheim and Bishop Burchard II of Halberstadt allegedly numbered 60,000 whilst his garrison only had 300 men. The king finally fled to Franconia in the night to 10 August, according to legend, through the well of the besieged castle and a secret passage.

The king initially did not gain much support by the German princes and in the 1074 Treaty of Gerstungen he was forced to agree to slight his castles, including the Harzburg. He hesitated, however, and only had the walls and towers demolished, whilst the buildings themselves remained. But in the spring of 1074 the Harzburg was plundered by annoyed peasants and completely destroyed. The collegiate church was not spared and the royal family tomb was desecrated. This incident prompted widespread indignation and gave Henry cause to advance with all his might against the rebellious Saxons again and so, on 9 June 1075, the rebels were defeated at the Battle of Langensalza.

Henry IV never returned to the Harzburg. Pope Gregory VII, who would become a bitter enemy during the Investiture Controversy, imposed a ban on the devastated site. In January 1077, the king had to make the Walk to Canossa to obtain the revocation of his excommunication.

=== Hohenstaufens and Welfs ===
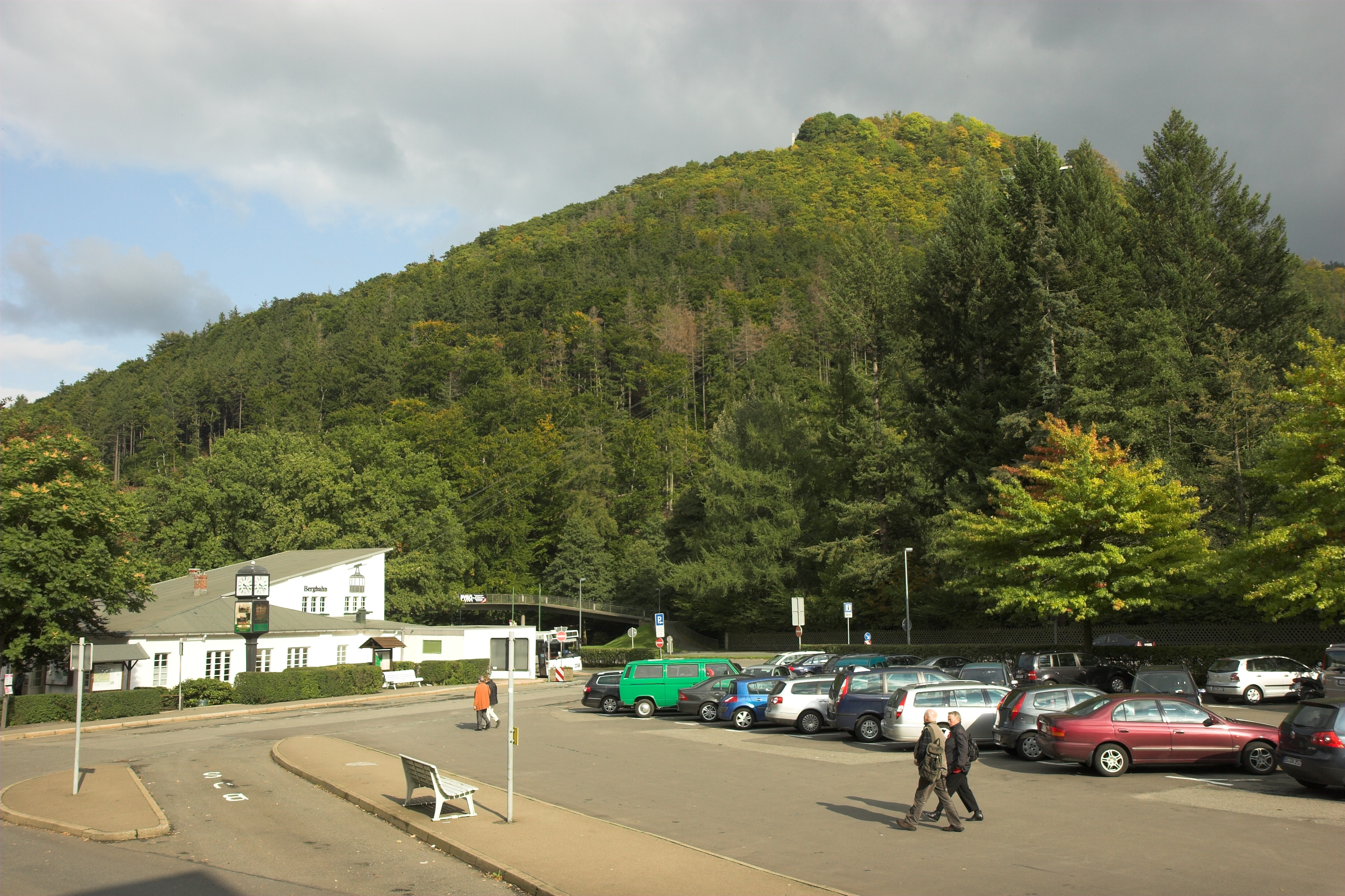
The Burgberg hill and Burgberg Cable Car

During the conflict of the Hohenstaufen emperor Frederick I with the Welf duke Henry the Lion, the rebuilding work on the castle continued until 1180. In January 1076 Henry had claimed the enfeoffment with Goslar and the Rammelsberg mines in turn for his support against the rebellious Italian cities of the Lombard League. The duke was deposed in 1180, yet Frederick felt it was necessary to protect Goslar against Henry's forces.

The complex was completed by Henry's son Emperor Otto IV, sole King of the Romans upon his rival Philip of Swabia in 1208. He was crowned Holy Roman Emperor by Pope Innocent III the next year, however, the two fell out soon after. Banned by the pope, he had to witness the election of the Hohenstaufen scion Frederick II in September 1211. Defeated by King Philip II of France in the 1214 Battle of Bouvines, he retired to his Saxon homelands and died at the Harzburg on 19 May 1218. The fortress lost its immediate function as an imperial castle as Otto's brother Henry of Brunswick had to surrender the Imperial Regalia to the Hohenstaufen dynasty.

In 1222 the Harzburg was awarded the title of castrum imperiale again. Relying on the existing imperial enfeoffment of the Harzburg seat, the character of the castle as an imperial fortress remained largely intact up to the time the Hohenstaufen dynasty became extinct and the castle was pledged to the Counts of Wernigerode in 1269.

=== Later history ===
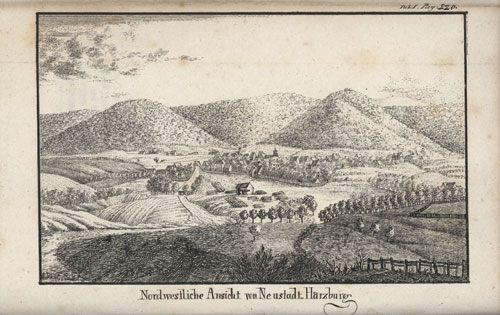
Northwestern view of Neustadt Harzburg, 1825

The following centuries were characterized by frequent changes of ownership. About 1370 it was occupied by the Welf duke Otto of Brunswick-Göttingen during the War of the Lüneburg Succession and entrusted to his ministerialis Hans von Schwicheldt, against fierce protest raised by the Wernigerode counts. In the early 15th century the Harzburg was pledged as a fief to the three sons of Hans von Schwicheldt, who turned it into a robber baron castle and ravaged the surrounding Brunswick, Hildesheim and Halberstadt lands.

The importance of the fortress decreased steadily, resulting in its slow decline. A rebuilding of the castle in the 16th century was never carried out due to the high cost. During the Thirty Years' War, the castle changed hands several times, although its garrison remained intact. Since this type of fortification had become insignificant due to the changed nature of warfare, demolition of the remaining elements of the ruin began in 1650. Since then the castle has amounted to little more than its foundation ruins and well. The urban settlement of Neustadt at the foot of the Großer Burgberg adopted the castle's name in 1892.

== Gallery ==
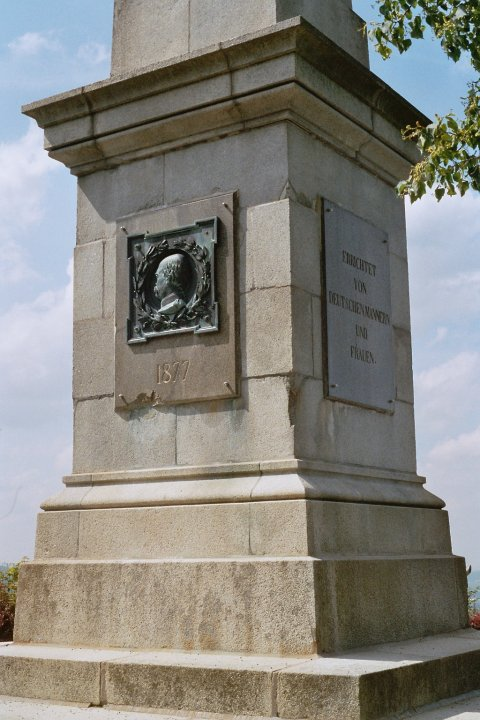
Bismarck on the Canossa Column

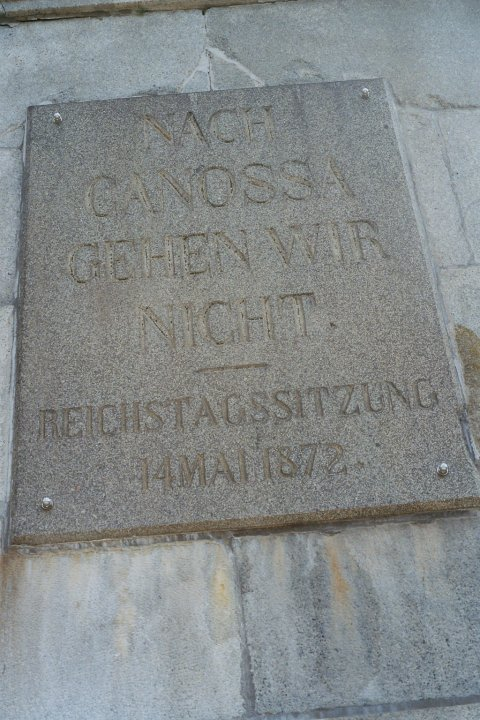
1872 quotation on the Canossa Column

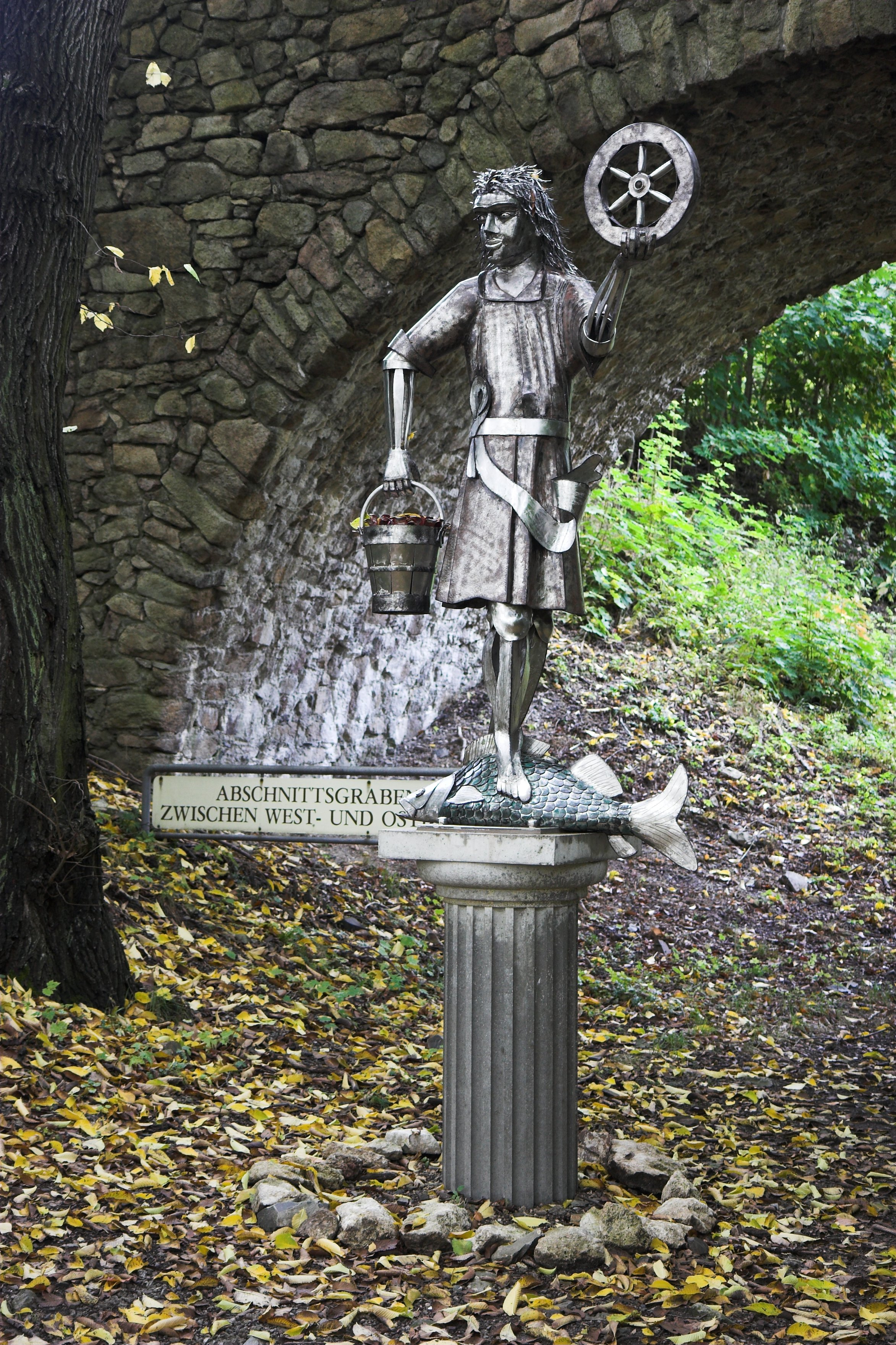
Krodo-Statue on the Harzburg

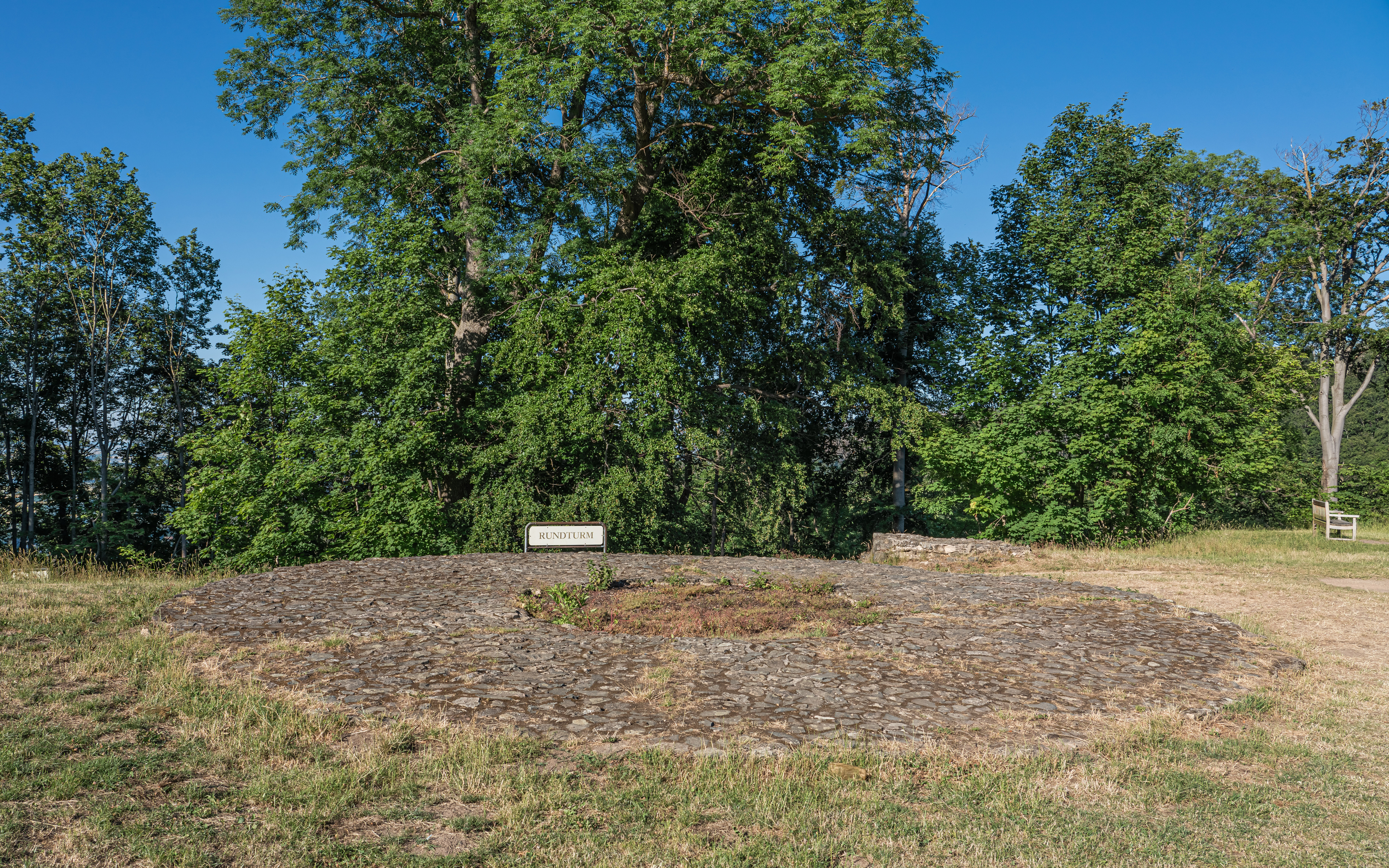
Foundation of the round tower

== Sources ==
- Ernst Andreas Friedrich (1992), Wenn Steine reden könnten (in German), vol. 2, Hannover: Landbuch-Verlag, ISBN 3-7842-0479-1
- Jan Habermann (2008), Die Grafen von Wernigerode (in German) (1. ed.), Norderstedt: Books on Demand, ISBN 978-3-8370-2820-1
- E. J. G. Leonhard (1825), Die Harzburg und ihre Geschichte (in German), Helmstedt: Fleckeisensche Buchhandlung
- Wolfgang Petke (1971), "Die Grafen von Wöltingerode-Wohldenberg", Veröffentlichungen des Instituts für Historische Landesforschung der Universität Gottingen (in German) (4), Hildesheim: Lax
- Wolf-Dieter Steinmetz (2001), Geschichte und Archäologie der Harzburg unter Saliern, Staufern und Welfen 1065–1254 (in German), Bad Harzburg
- Friedrich Stolberg (1968), Befestigungsanlagen im und am Harz von der Frühgeschichte bis zur Neuzeit (in German), Hildesheim: Lax
- Heinrich Spier (1985), Die Geschichte der Harzburg (in German), Bad Harzburg: Harzburger Altertums- und Geschichtsverein
- Joachim Lehrmann (2007), Raubritter zwischen Heide, Harz und Weser (in German), Lehrte
