= Johannes Alberti (bishop) =

German Roman Catholic prelate

Most Reverend Johannes Alberti
- Auxiliary Bishop of Halberstadt; Titular Bishop of Tripolis in Phoenicia
- Church: Catholic Church
- Diocese: Diocese of Halberstadt
- In office: 1550–?
- Predecessor: Johannes Mensing

Johannes Alberti, O.P. was a Roman Catholic prelate who served as Auxiliary Bishop of Halberstadt (1550–?).

== Biography ==
Johannes Alberti was ordained a priest in the Order of Preachers. On 27 Jun 1550, he was appointed during the papacy of Pope Julius III as Auxiliary Bishop of Halberstadt and Titular Bishop of Tripolis in Phoenicia. It is uncertain how long he served.

== See also ==
- Catholic Church in Germany
