= Burchard II =

Burchard II may refer to:

- Burchard II, Duke of Swabia (883/884–926)
- Burchard II (Bishop of Halberstadt) (c. 1028–1088)
