= Herrand (bishop of Halberstadt) =

German prelate

Herrand (died 23/24 October 1102) was a German prelate who served as abbot of Ilsenburg (c. 1070–1090) and bishop of Halberstadt (1090–1102).

== Life ==
Herrand was probably born in Swabia around 1040. He belonged to a prominent family that produced several leading churchmen. One of his predecessors, Burchard II of Halberstadt, was his uncle and the Archbishops Anno II of Cologne and Werner of Magdeburg were his great uncles on his father's side.

Herrand was originally a monk of Gorze Abbey. He was sent to reform Saint Burchard's in Würzburg. His uncle appointed him schoolmaster of Halberstadt Cathedral and by 1070 he was abbot of Ilsenburg. He reformed the monastery and helped to re-establish the monastery of Huysburg in 1076. After Burchard's death in 1088, he was elected bishop.

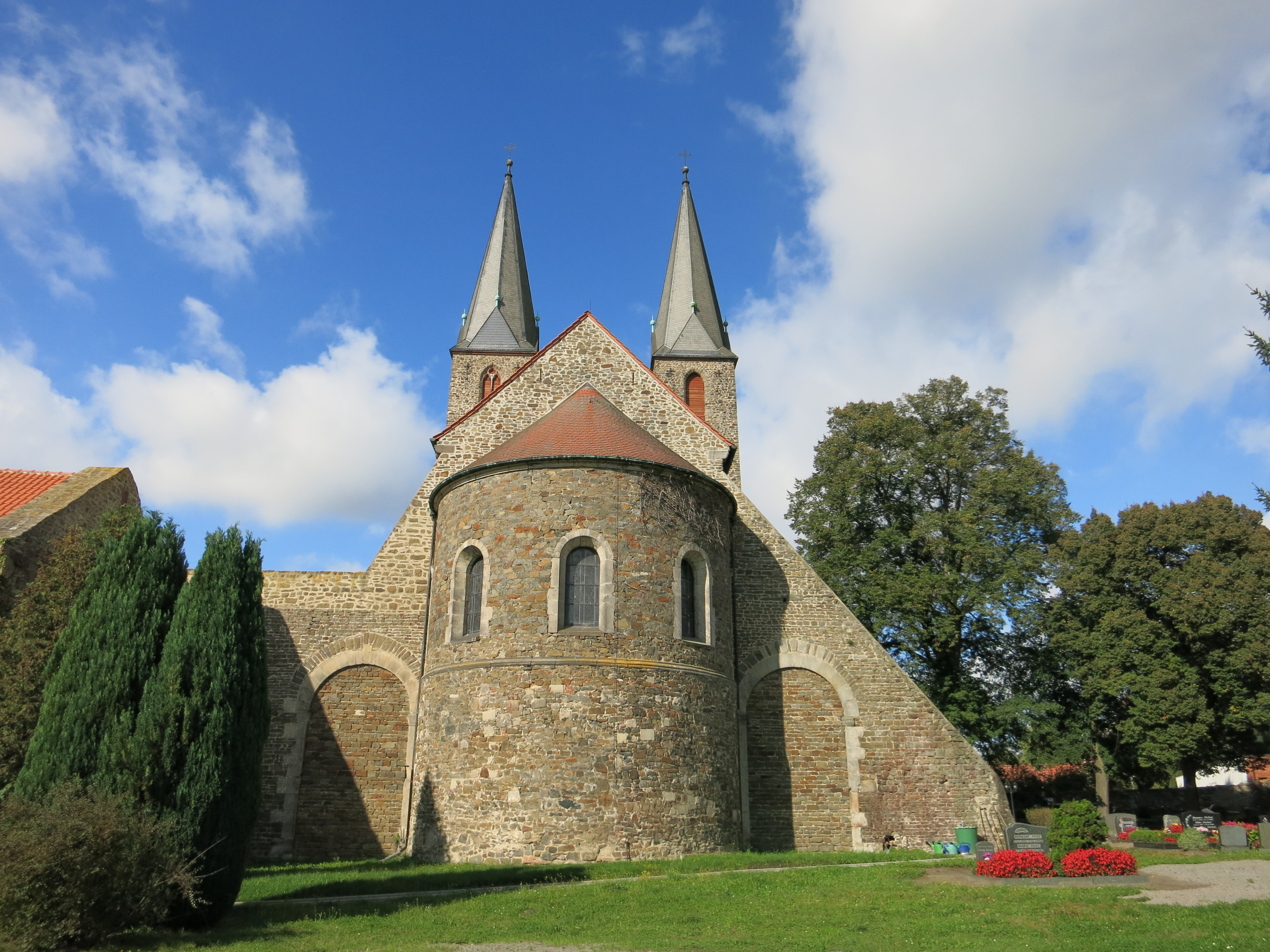
Hillersleben, made a provostry of Ilsenburg by Herrand in 1096

Owing to the Investiture Contest, Herrand was unable even to enter the city, which was controlled by partisans of the Emperor Henry IV. He was consecrated by Pope Urban II in Rome on 19 January 1094 and took the name Stephen. In 1096, he established a provostry at Hillersleben subject to Ilsenburg Abbey. Around 1100, he arranged for the monks of Ilsenburg to be moved to Harsefeld Abbey when they came under threat. He himself took refuge in Magdeburg and later lived as a monk in Reinhardsbrunn Abbey, where he died.

== Works ==
The reformed monastic customs which Herrand pioneered in Saxony, based on those of Gorze and the Cluniac Reform, are known as the Ordo Ilseneburgensis. Beyond the houses which Herrand reformed directly, their influence was felt at Reinhardsbrunn (from 1084), Admont (1091) and Lippoldsberg (c. 1100).

Herrand wrote several works which are lost or fragmentary. During his time in Ilsenburg, he kept yearbooks which were used as sources by the Saxon Annalist, Helmold of Bosau and the compilers of the Annals of Pöhlde, the Annals of Harsefeld, the Annals of Magdeburg and the Annals of Nienburg. His Passio Burchardi, an account of the death of Burchard II, is excerpted by the Saxon Annalist. It otherwise survives only in a fragmentary copy of the 17th century. Herrand also wrote a sermon on Burchard and a treatise "on hope", De spera, both now lost. A letter he wrote to Bishop Walram of Naumburg survives in a 12th-century manuscript. In 1094 or 1095, Walram, who belonged to Henry IV's party, wrote to persuade Count Louis the Springer to change sides. At Louis's request, Herrand penned a response, the Epistola de causa Heinrici regis ("Letter on the Case of King Henry").
