= Herrand =

Herrand (Latin Herrandus) is a masculine given name that may refer to:

- Herrand, abbot of Tegernsee Abbey in 1042–1046
- Herrand (bishop of Strasbourg), died 1065
- Herrand (bishop of Halberstadt), died 1102
- Herrand I of Wildon, nobleman, died 1222
- Herrand II of Wildon, poet, died 1278
- Marcel Herrand (1897–1953), French actor
