= Gardolf of Hertbeke =

Gardolf of Hertbeke (died 21 August 1201) was the bishop of Halberstadt from 1193 until his death.

Gardolf was from a noble family of Hertbeke. In two charters, he describes himself as "a blood relative" (Latin consanguineus) of Conrad of Krosigk. The Deeds of the Bishops of Halberstadt states that he was a blood relative of Conrad of Querfurt also. He was probably related to Conrad of Krosigk's mother, Adelheid of Hertbeke. By May 1184 both he and Conrad were subdeacons of Halberstadt Cathedral.

By 1193 Gardolf had become dean and vicedominus of the cathedral. According to the Deeds of the Bishops, he served as a chaplain at the court of King Henry VI of Germany. When Bishop Dietrich of Krosigk died on 10 August 1193, Gardolf was elected to succeed him. Henry VI immediately confirmed the election and was personally present for Gardolf's priestly ordination and episcopal consecration. Gardolf committed to Henry VI's German Crusade, which did not set out until after Henry's death on 28 September 1197. He was absent from his diocese for two years in the Holy Land (1197–1198).

In 1198 there was a double election and civil war over the succession to Henry VI. Gardolf and his diocese remained loyal to the Staufer dynasty and favoured Duke Philip of Swabia, while Pope Innocent III favoured Count Otto of Poitou. In early 1202, Innocent sent Cardinal Guy Paré to Germany as his legate to bring the German church over to Otto's side. The arrival of the legate greatly distressed Gardolf. According to the Deeds of the Bishops, however, he was so esteemed in Germany than even bishops who favoured Otto sent him letters of support. Gardolf received permission from the legate to take his case to Rome in person, which would cause him to miss the cardinal's upcoming synod at Corbie. On 21 August 1201, he died of a fever at the house of Augustinian canons in Kaltenborn shortly after setting out for Rome. Conrad of Krosigk, his kinsman, led the funeral cortege from Kaltenborn to the cathedral, where he was interred.

== Bibliography ==
- Andrea, A. J. (1987). "Conrad of Krosigk, Bishop of Halberstadt, Crusader and Monk of Sittichenbach: His Ecclesiastical Career, 1184–1225". Analecta Cisterciensia. 43: 11–91.
- Schmidt, Gustav (1874). "Zur Chronologie der Halberstadter Bischöfe. I. Gardolf, 1193–1201". Zeitschrift des Harz-Vereins für Geschichte und Alterthumskunde. 7: 51–58.
