= Hildegrim =

Hildegrim may refer to:

- Hildegrim of Châlons (died 827), bishop of Châlons, abbot of Werden
- Hildegrim II (died 886), abbot of Werden
