= Conrad of Krosigk =

German prelate, crusader and monk

Conrad of Krosigk (c. 1162 – 21 June 1225) was a German prelate, crusader and monk. He served as the bishop of Halberstadt from 1201 until 1208 and took part in the Fourth Crusade in 1202–1204. He resigned his see to become a Cistercian monk at Sittichenbach Abbey. In his retirement, he undertook frequent Papal missions.

Born to a minor noble family, Conrad rose through the ranks of the diocese of Halberstadt. By 1193 he was chief provost, shouldering major responsibility during Bishop Gardolf's absence on the Crusade of 1197–1198. He supported Duke Philip of Swabia over Count Otto of Poitou in the German succession war that began in 1198. For this reason, he was excommunicated shortly after his election as bishop and joined the Fourth Crusade. He was with the army at the sack of Constantinople. Afterwards he fulfilled his vow to go to the Holy Land and exercised episcopal authority in the see of Tyre during the archbishop's six-month absence. He later served as vicar of the see of Naumburg for over a year in 1217–1218.

Upon his return to Europe after the crusade, Conrad made peace with Otto. He resigned his bishopric and took monastic vows against the orders of Pope Innocent III. Nonetheless, he received papal commissions fifteen times in the last fourteen years of his life. In 1209, he commissioned the extension of the Deeds of the Bishops of Halberstadt down to the end of his own pontificate, including an important account of the Fourth Crusade based in part on his eyewitness testimony.

== Early life ==
=== Family ===
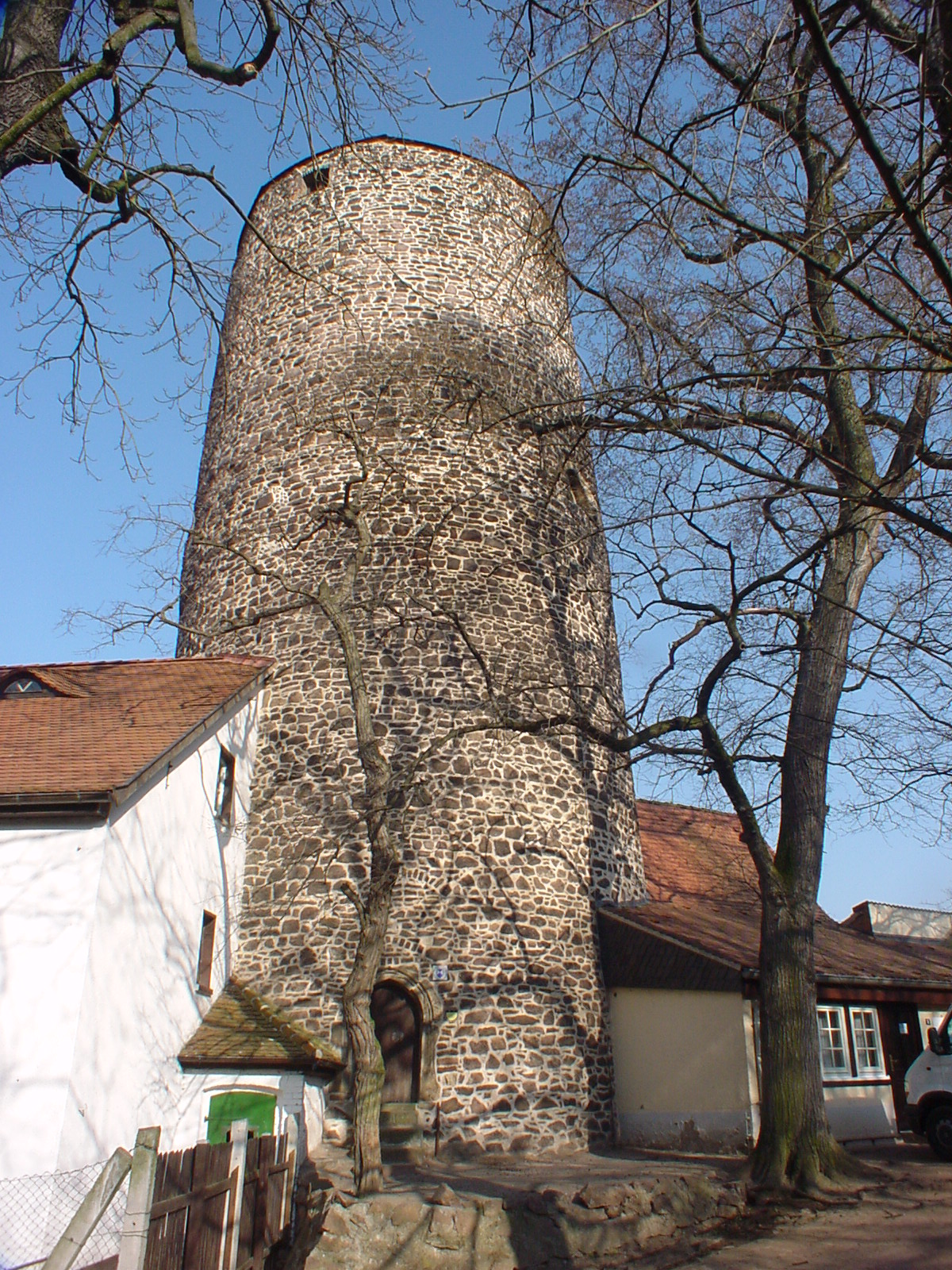
Tower from the castle of Krosigk.

Conrad was a nobleman, the son of Dedo II of Krosigk and Adelheid of Hertbeke. Their two families had been intermarrying since the mid-11th century. Conrad had two brothers, Gunzelin and Frederick, and a sister, Bertradis, who became abbess of Quedlinburg. His paternal uncle, Dietrich, was the bishop of Halberstadt between 1180 and 1193. A maternal relative, Gardolf of Hertbeke, was his immediate predecessor as bishop from 1193 to 1201. Gardolf was a relative of Conrad of Querfurt, bishop of Hildesheim, and so too perhaps was Conrad of Krosigk.

According to the Deeds of the Bishops, Conrad "was imbued from an early age with liberal studies".

=== Canon of Halberstadt ===
Through the patronage of relatives, Conrad rose rapidly in the church. His earliest appearance in any document dates to 1184, when a Cunradus de Crozuch is mentioned as a canon of Halberstadt Cathedral. He may have been a canon since 1180, but no document earlier than 1184 clearly identifies him. He and Garold of Hertbeke were both subdeacons in 1184.

By April 1185, Conrad had been made provost of the church of the Blessed Virgin while retaining his subdiaconate. By April 1186 he had been promoted to full deacon. He continued as provost of the Blessed Virgin until his election as bishop. From June 1189 at the latest he also held the provostry of Saint Paul's, probably on a temporary basis. In 1191, Bishop Dietrich had to intervene to settle a difference of opinion between Conrad and the canons of Saint Paul's over the election of new canons. Later that year, but before September, Conrad relinquished the post. In 1193, he succeeded Anselm as chief provost of the diocese, i.e. provost of the cathedral.

In 1193, Gardolf was elected bishop. His election highlights the close relationship between the diocese of Halberstadt, the Krosigk and Hertbeke families and the reigning Staufer dynasty. Gardolf had previously served as a chaplain to the Emperor Henry VI and the emperor attended his ordination and consecration in person. Gardolf joined the German Crusade being organized by Henry VI and was away on crusade from 1197 to 1198. During his absence, Conrad's duties would have become correspondingly greater. Gardolf died in August 1201 and Conrad escorted his body back from Kaltenborn for burial in the cathedral.

== Bishop ==
=== Election and excommunication ===
In 1198, a disputed royal election led to civil war. Gardolf and the diocese of Halberstad sided with Henry VI's younger brother, Duke Philip of Swabia. The pope, however, backed his rival, Count Otto of Poitou. In this situation, Ludolf of Kroppenstedt, archbishop of Magdeburg, came to Halberstadt to oversee the election and perhaps to assure the selection of a pro-Philip candidate. Conrad was elected. He was invested with the regalia (the secular jurisdiction associated with the bishopric) by King Philip at Halle, probably before 8 September. He was then ordained a priest by Ludolf and consecrated as bishop on 1 January 1202 by bishops Hartwich of Eichstätt, Norbert of Brandenburg and Helmbert of Havelberg.

Conrad's pontificate was a difficult one. Shortly after his consecration, some of the diocese's vassals, mostly knights who favoured Otto's claim over Philips, rebelled. Conrad quashed the rebellion, capturing the castle of Schwanebeck in the process. He was then ordered to appear before the cardinal-legate Guy Paré at Cologne within seven days, a summons impossible to meet. When he failed to appear, as Guy expected, the cardinal excommunicated him. At about the same time, Conrad appealed Guy's summons to the pope. If his appeal had been launched before his excommunication, the latter would have been invalid, but as it was Pope Innocent III upheld Guy's actions. His excommunication greatly distressed Conrad, as can be seen in a latter of April or May 1202 confirming some donations to the monastery of Schöningen.

=== Fourth Crusade ===
Still excommunicated, Conrad joined the Fourth Crusade on Palm Sunday, 7 April 1202, publicising his vow in a sermon he gave at his sister's abbey of Quedlinburg. Conrad gained two immediate practical benefits from this act: Papal protection of his property and the right of essoin (the suspension of judicial proceedings against him). It did not lift his excommunication, but it appears that his status was not widely known within the crusader army. While on crusade, he was treated like the other bishops.

Conrad received a gift of 500 marks from Albert, dean of Magdeburg Cathedral, to help defray the costs of his expedition. He departed on 1 May and passed through Bohemia, Austria, Salzburg and Aquileia before joining the army at Venice. He arrived after a deal had been struck between the crusaders and Venice whereby the latter would provide the ships if the former attacked Zara, a Christian city held by Venice's rival, Hungary. Disturbed, Conrad sought out the Papal legate, Peter of Capua, but was ordered not to leave the army.

On the question of the diversion of the crusade to Constantinople, Conrad was one of those in favour. He was probably part of the group of western prelates summoned to a meeting with the Greek archbishop of Corfu, whereat the archbishop mocked the notion of Roman primacy. According to Robert de Cléry, the bishop of Halberstadt (li veskes de Havestait) exhorted the men during the assault of 9 April 1204. He was one of the electors who chose Baldwin of Flanders as emperor on 9 May and with the other bishops took part in his coronation on 16 May.

=== Vicar of Tyre ===
Conrad left Constantinople loaded with relics on 17 August 1204 to complete his vow to pilgrimage in the Holy Land. He disembarked in Tyre on 7 October and stayed in the Holy Land six months. From Tyre he proceeded to Acre, where Peter of Capua and the legate Soffredo were residing. There he convinced them to lift his excommunication by promising to go to Rome to swear an oath of obedience in person.

During his sojourn in the Holy Land, he acted as the vicar of the absent archbishop of Tyre, Clarembald. He moved into the bishop's palace. He ordained and consecrated a new bishop of Sidon. He oversaw the reconstruction of a part of the city wall damaged in the earthquake of 1202. He also liberally distributed alms, probably mostly his own money, both the gift of Albert of Magdeburg and booty acquired in Constantinople. He contracted quartan fever on a visit to the city of Tortosa and was cured after visiting the Cathedral of Our Lady. According to the Deeds of the Bishops, after his recovery he visited a "certain philosopher" in Tyre, in fact a fortune teller, who revealed to him his future.

=== Trip to Rome ===
In March 1205, his financial resources spent, Conrad prepared to go to Rome to fulfill his promise to the legates. He received a royal send-off from King Aimery of Jerusalem when he embarked for Italy on 30 March. Abbot Martin of Pairis seems to have been in the same convoy. He traveled by way of Crete, survived severe storms on 6–10 April and landed in Venice on 28 May. There he was met by the deacon of Halberstadt, Burchard, and an envoy of King Philip. In addition, he had an audience with Doge Enrico Dandolo. He participated in the Venetian Pentecost festivities the following day and left most of his baggage with Burchard before going on to Rome.

In Rome, Conrad presented a letter he had drafted in Constantinople and signed by King Aimery in Acre, which reads in part:

Surely among our venerable pontiffs, Lord Halberstadt seemed deservedly praiseworthy as one who had both practical advice and extraordinary solicitude in these matters. Of benefit to our army by word and example throughout everything, he openly showed by action the reverence for the Apostolic See which he bore in his heart.

Despite Innocent III's insistence, Conrad refused to abandon his support for Philip, which would have broken his oath to the king. He was probably forced, however, to take a special oath of obedience to the Holy See, since Innocent in a letter of July or August 1208 demanded that he give his support to Otto after Philip's death "bound as [he was] by oath". On 26 June 1205, Innocent addressed a Papal bull to the people and clergy of Halberstadt informing them that Conrad had been formally readmitted to communion. On 29 June, Conrad took part in a public mass alongside the pope.

=== Return to Halberstadt ===
Conrad returned to Halberstadt by way of Bologna, where he paid for the return trips of several students from Halberstadt studying at the University of Bologna. As he approached Halberstadt, Duke Bernard III of Saxony and a large crowd came out to greet him. On 16 August 1205, Conrad deposited the relics he had brought in Halberstadt Cathedral. In 1208, he declared an annual festival every 16 August to commemorate the transfer of the relics to Halberstadt. He had brought back a purported trace of the blood of Christ, a purported strand of the Virgin Mary's hair and purported pieces of the True Cross, the Holy Sepulchre, the Crown of Thorns, Christ's burial shroud, the veil of Veronica, Christ's purple robe, the Holy Sponge and Reed, Christ's sandals and Mary's clothes. He also had relics attributed to John the Baptist, Peter, Paul, Andrew, Simon, Philip, Barnabas, James the Just, Stephen, Clement, Lawrence, Cosmas and Damian. Besides relics, Conrad gifted to his cathedral church several expensive items acquired in Constantinople. All these objects were presumably looted.

After his return, Conrad took back the castle of Oschersleben, which Ludolf of Magdeburg had seized from a ministerialis of the see of Halberstadt. He led a military campaign against the castle of Eilsleben, which had been constructed by supporters of Otto. After capturing the fortress, he razed it.

In 1205, Conrad completed an unfinished work that Bishop Gardolf begun in 1199 when he set up some Cistercian nuns in the hospice and church of Saint Jacob in the city. By 1207, he was showing distinct favouritism to the Cistercian Order, particularly the monasteries of Mariental (where his mother was buried) and Riddagshausen. In charters favouring the Cistercians, Conrad could say that "although by the debt of our office we are obliged to bear the burden of the care of all churches suffragan to us in the Lord, yet most of all we are constrained to provide for the benefit of the Cistercians." In 1208, he arranged to exchange the church of Saint Jacob for the Templar church of Saint Burchard and thus moved the Cistercian sisters outside the walls.

Following the death of King Philip in 1208, Conrad pledged fealty to Otto, even giving him 800 marks as a token of submission. Shortly after, probably between 16 August and 22 September 1208, Conrad resigned the episcopal office. According to the Deeds of the Bishops, this was to fulfill a secret "vow which he had for so long borne in his heart, even though it was forbidden him by apostolic authority". He retired to the Cistercian monastery of Sittichenbach (Sichem).

=== Relics and history ===
After leaving his see, Conrad commissioned the addition of an account his and Gardolf's reigns to the Deeds of the Bishops of Halberstadt. This he may have done as early as late 1208, but it was not completed until after the election of his successor and his absolution by the pope in early 1209. It was written by a single anonymous author and is an apologia for Conrad's pontificate, especially his actions on crusade. Although not unbiased, it "largely [tells] a factually correct story."

The Deeds presents Conrad's relics as having miraculously brought peace to Germany. Conrad declared the date of the deposition of the relics in the cathedral, 16 August, a diocesan feast day. Any person living in the vicinity of Halberstadt who venerated the relics on that day would receive an indulgence of forty days those who travelled from further afield sixty days. Conrad gave the church a new altar to support the cult of the relics. When he retired to Sittichenbach, however, he brought the relics with him. These included one or two holy thorns, a lock of the Virgin Mary's hair, the finger of St Nicholas and relics of the apostles Bartholomew, Simon, Thomas and Paul.

== Monk ==
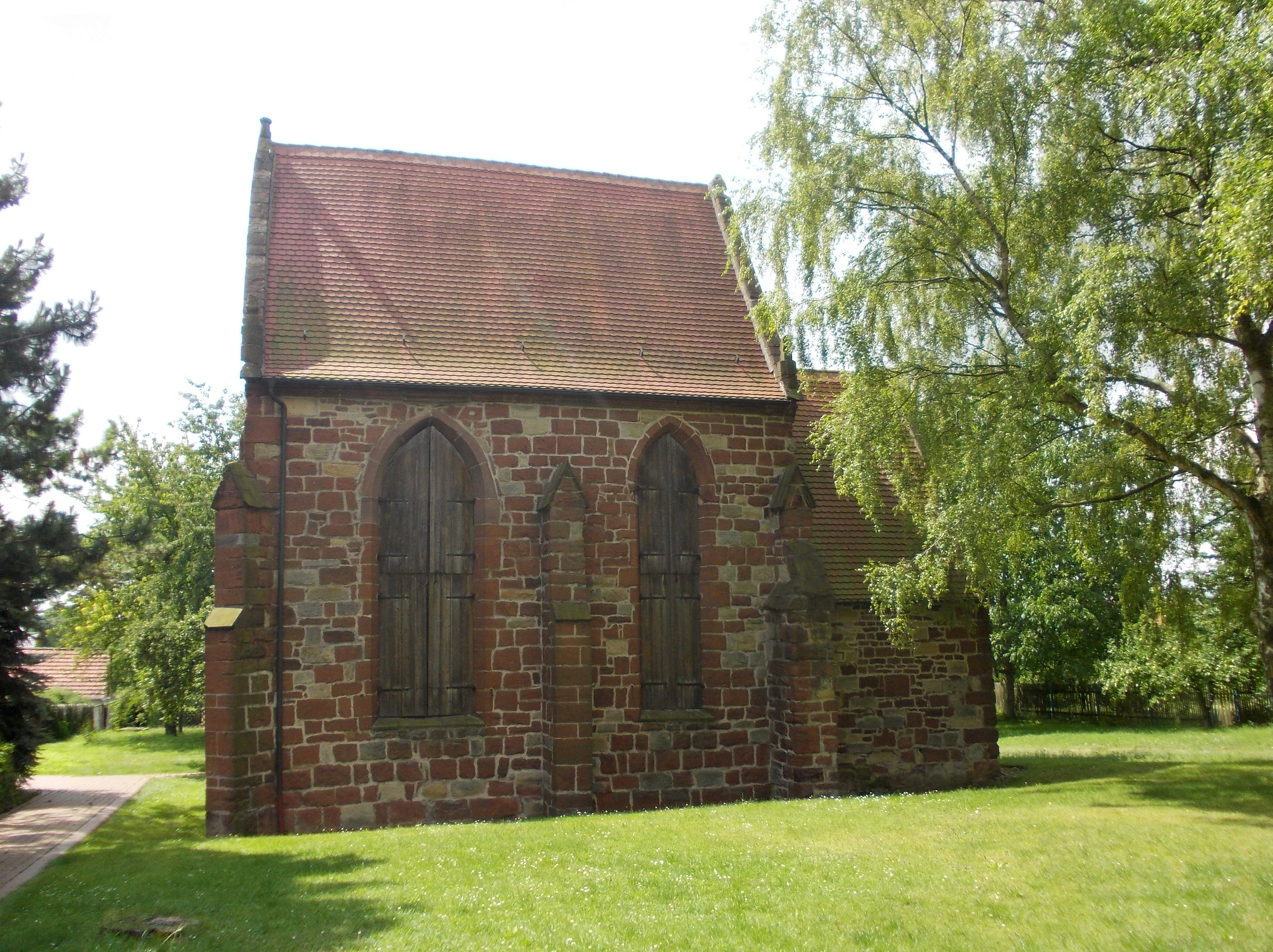
The abbot's chapel, one of the few remaining building's from Sittichenbach in Conrad's time.

=== Solitude and penance ===
For defying apostolic authority and retiring to a monastery, Conrad went to Rome to seek the pope's absolution in person. Accompanied by his abbot, he travelled to Rome and back probably between early spring and late summer 1209. The final months of 1208 and 1209 and the first months of 1210 were the only extended periods of solitude Conrad enjoyed as a monk. He may have undergone a novitiate. Between 1211 and 1225, he received fifteen Papal commissions, which required him to regularly leave his monastery and involve himself again in contemporary politics.

Having resigned his diocese, Conrad remained a bishop in rank and prerogative even while also a monk. Contemporary documents often refer to him as the "[lord] [brother] bishop [and monk] of Sichem", or "in Sichem". In Papal documents he is referred to as the "former bishop of Halberstadt" (episcopus quondam Halberstadensis), although he was always addressed by the pope as "brother" (as protocol demanded for a bishop) and not as "son" (as it would for a monk). When on Papal commission, he was ranked below the diocesan bishops but above the abbots (even his own).

In the 19th century, Julius Otto Opel identified the "my dear [old] hermit" (mîn guoter [alter] klôsenaere) who is mentioned in three anti-Papal songs of the poet Walther von der Vogelweide with the retired Conrad. While the poet and bishop almost certainly knew each other, the context of the songs suggests that, if the unnamed hermit was a historical person, it was someone other than Conrad.

=== Papal judge delegate ===
Conrad undertook two missions as papal judge delegate to Poland. On 21 April 1211, the pope sent Conrad and the abbot of Sittichenbach to Duke Władysław Spindleshanks of Greater Poland, who had seized the treasure of the archdiocese of Gniezno. Their mission was at least a partial success and Władysław moderated his position. In 1213, Conrad mediated a dispute over tithes between Duke Henry the Bearded of Silesia and Bishop Wawrzyniec of Wrocław. The bishop shortly after granted some tithes to the Cistercian house of Lubiąż, probably out of gratitude to Conrad.

Between 1212 and 1222, Conrad was involved on three occasions in the drawn-out dispute involving Nienburg Abbey. In 1212, Abbot Gernot charged Duke Albert I of Saxony and the abbey's own advocate, Count Henry I of Anhalt, with damages to abbatial properties and animals. Innocent III first sent Bishop Dietrich of Merseburg to deal with it, but after his failure he sent Conrad to order the parties to send procurators to Rome. Henry refused to comply and the dispute remained open on 9 March 1218, when Honorius authorized Conrad and two co-delegates (Abbot William of Cella and Master Conrad of Marburg) to resolve the dispute if they could, otherwise to summon procurators to appear in Rome and if the defendants failed to comply to issue a default judgement in favour of Nienburg. After all this, Henry refused to yield and Conrad and his co-delegates excommunicated him. This brought them into dispute with Archbishop Albert of Magdeburg, who lifted the excommunication. The delegates' actions were upheld by the pope in 1220. In 1222, Conrad was again brought in as part of a three-judge panel to hear a suit by Gernot against Henry. The following year case was resolved, although the exact resolution and Conrad's role in it are not known.

On 17 June 1220, Pope Honorius III sent Conrad along with Bishops Engelhard of Naumburg and Eckard of Merseburg to investigate the claim of the abbey of Gandersheim to the land on which the castle of Asseburg had been built.

As a judge delegate, Conrad was involved three disputed ecclesiastical elections. The first, in 1221, involved the right of the canons of the church of Soest to elect their own provost. The case was actually heard and decided by Cardinal Raniero Capocci, but Conrad was charged with holding the Stift (church property) in the interim. In 1223, Conrad was part of the panel that confirmed Master Oliver's election as bishop of Paderborn, a judgement upheld on papal appeal in 1225. The most contentious dispute he was involved in was that of Quedlinburg. A faction had deposed the Abbess Sophia and elected Conrad's sister Bertradis in her place. Conrad's refusal to recuse himself angered Pope Honorius, who several times referred to the ex-bishops "rashness". Bertradis election was ultimately confirmed, but only after Conrad's death.

=== Preaching the crusades ===
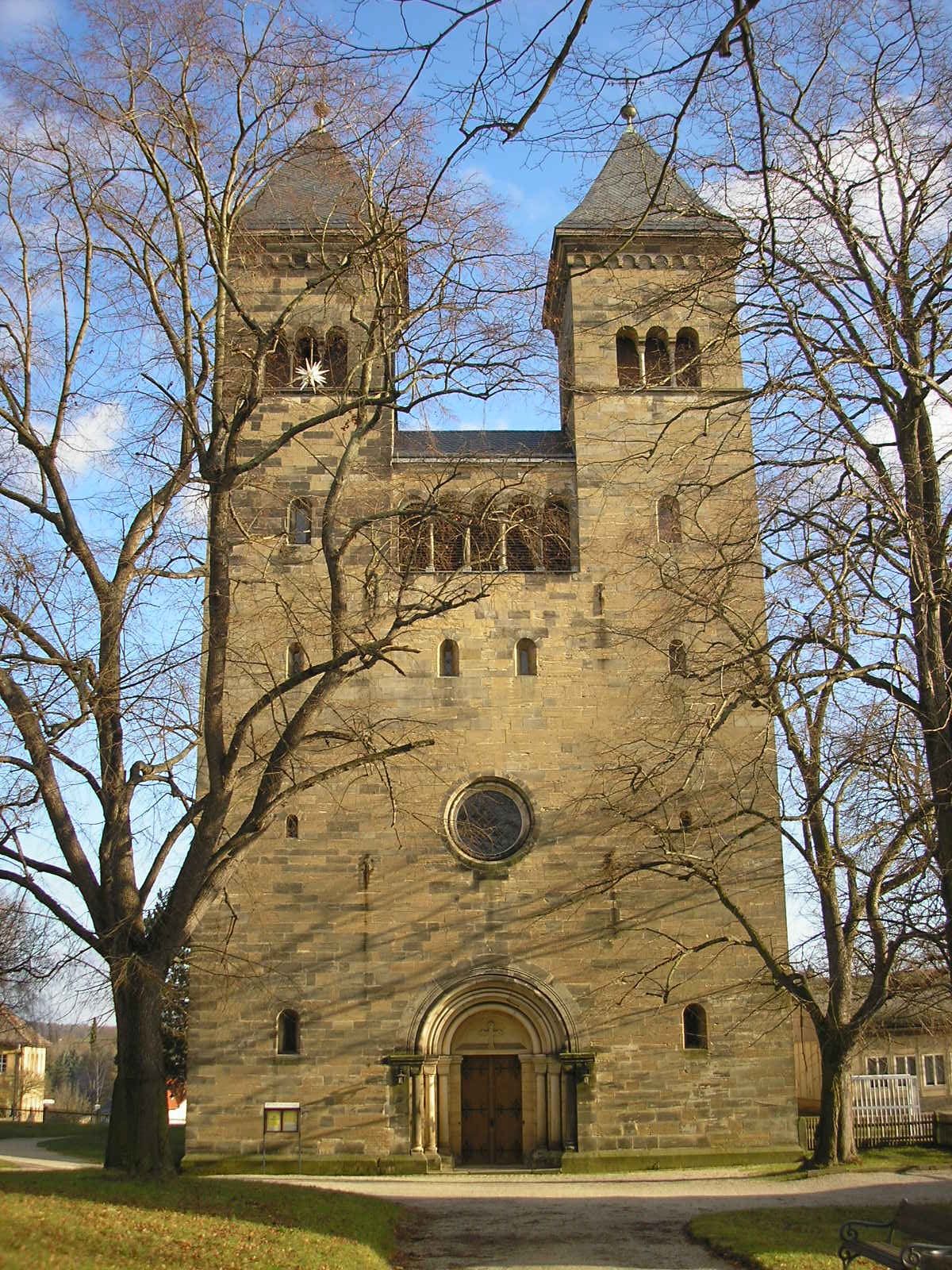
Conrad dedicated an altar in Lausnitz during his vicarship in Naumburg in 1217.

In 1213, Conrad was charged with preaching what became the Fifth Crusade in the archdioceses of Magdeburg and Bremen. In 1214, according to the Chronica Montis Sereni, a picture of a crucifix in the market church at Halle was claimed by a local priest named Peter to have healing powers. While the chronicler regarded the entire affair, which generated money for the church, as a fraud, he notes that Conrad testified to the authenticity of the miracles in his public preaching. In 1216, along with Conrad of Marburg and John of Xanten, Conrad of Krosigk was named a delegate of the crusade in the province of Bremen. This gave him the authority to preach, to collect pledges (by force if necessary) and to spend monies in furtherance of the crusade.

Between March 1217 and the summer of 1218, Conrad served as vicar of Naumburg on behalf of Bishop Engelhard, who was absent on the crusade. During this time, the title he used was "by the grace of God, bishop and monk in Sichem and legate of the Holy Cross", indicating that his vicariate was an extension of legatine crusade mission. On 4 May 1217, as vicar, Conrad dedicated a new altar in Lausnitz Abbey. On 9 October, he presided over a diocesan synod. On 8 November, he witnessed a charter of the Emperor Frederick II when the latter visited Altenburg Abbey. In early 1218, he confirmed the foundation of a hospital in the diocese by the daughter, Mechtild, of the burgrave of Meissen, Meinher.

On 7 March 1224, Honorius III commissioned Conrad once again to preach the crusade (the eventual Sixth Crusade) in the province of Magdeburg.

== Death ==
Conrad died on 21 June 1225. His death opened up disputes between the cathedral and the monastery concerning the bequest of some of Conrad's relics. Cardinal Conrad of Urach settled the dispute by dividing the relics between the two churches.

== Bibliography ==
- Andrea, A. J. (1987). "Conrad of Krosigk, Bishop of Halberstadt, Crusader and Monk of Sittichenbach: His Ecclesiastical Career, 1184–1225". Analecta Cisterciensia. 43: 11–91.
- Andrea, A. J. (1996). "The Anonymous Chronicler of Halberstadt's Account of the Fourth Crusade: Popular Religiosity in the Early Thirteenth Century". Historical Reflections. 22 (2): 447–455, 457–477. JSTOR 41299068.
- Longnon, J. (1978). Les compagnons de Villehardouin: Recherches sur les croisés de la quatrième croisade (in French). Librairie Droz. OCLC 4171535.
