= Deeds of the Bishops of Halberstadt =

The Deeds of the Bishops of Halberstadt (Latin: Gesta episcoporum Halberstadensium) is an anonymous Latin chronicle of the diocese of Halberstadt from its foundation in 780 down to 1209.

The Deeds was the work of several authors over two centuries. The earliest part was written towards the end of the episcopate of Hildeward (968–995). It may have initially been no more than a list of bishops. Eventually historical information on the bishops' acts and events in the Holy Roman Empire were added. The final addition to the chronicle was made around 1209.

The last section of the Deeds, covering the pontificates of Gardolf (1193–1201) and Conrad of Krosigk (1201–1208), ends with the election of Conrad's successor, Frederick of Kirchberg. It is conventionally attributed the Anonymous of Halberstadt (Latin: Anonymus Halberstadensis). He must have used Bishop Conrad, a participant in the Fourth Crusade, as a source. He may even have been directed or supervised by Conrad, since his work reads like an apologia for the bishop's actions on crusade. His addition to the Deeds is a distinct work in itself. In the 19th century, Paul Riant took the part of this account beginning with the rubric "The Pilgrimage to Greece" to be a separate standalone work, which he titled De peregrinatione in Greciam et adventu reliqiuarum de Grecia libellus (Little Book on the Pilgrimage to Greece and the Arrival of Relics from Greece) in his edition. Alfred Andrea disputes Riant's hypothesis that the crusade account can be separated from the rest of the account of Conrad's episcopate.

The Deeds survives only in two late manuscript copies, one from 1423 and another from the 17th century.

== Editions ==
- Ludwig Weiland (ed.), Gesta episcoporum Halberstadensium, Monumenta Germaniae Historica, Scriptores, Vol. 23 (Hanover, 1874), pp. 73–123.
- Paul Riant (ed.), De peregrinatione in Greciam et adventu reliqiuarum de Grecia libellus, Exuviae sacrae Constantinopolitanae, Vol. 1 (Geneva, 1876), pp. 10–21.
