= Roman Catholic Diocese of Halberstadt =

Suppressed Roman Catholic Diocese

Diocese of Halberstadt
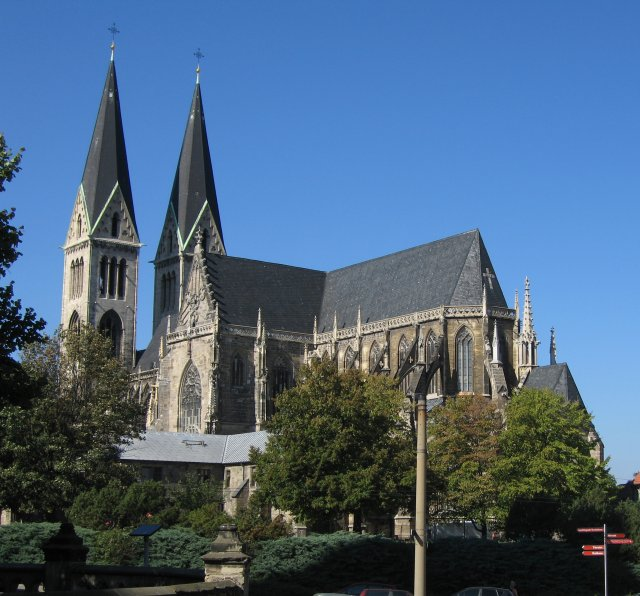
- Halberstadt Cathedral

Information
- First holder: Hildegrim of Châlons
- Established: 804
- Dissolved: 1648

The Diocese of Halberstadt was a Catholic diocese (German: Bistum Halberstadt) from 804 until 1648. From 1180, the bishops or administrators of Halberstadt ruled a state within the Holy Roman Empire, the prince-bishopric of Halberstadt (German Hochstift Halberstadt). The diocesan seat and secular capital was Halberstadt in present-day Saxony-Anhalt.

== History ==
=== Early history ===
In the aftermath of the Saxon Wars, Emperor Charlemagne in 804 established a missionary diocese at Osterwieck (then called Seligenstadt) in Eastphalia, in the course of the Christianisation of the pagan Saxons and Polabian Slavs. Under its (supposed) first bishop Hildegrim of Châlons the capital was moved to Halberstadt, confirmed by Charles' son Louis the Pious in an 814 deed. The bishopric's boundaries originally reached the Elbe and Saale rivers in the east, nevertheless, when Emperor Otto I founded the Archbishopric of Magdeburg in 968, Halberstadt lost the eastern half of its district to it. Halberstadt diocese was a suffragan of the Archdiocese of Mainz.

The Halberstadt bishops rivalled with Magdeburg to gain political influence in the days of the Ottonian and Salian dynasty. Under the rule of Emperor Henry III they were vested with further territorial rights and in 1062 Bishop Burchard II was sent to Rome as an Imperial mediator in the conflict between Pope Alexander II and Antipope Honorius II. However the former favourite of Dowager Empress Agnes of Poitou and her son Henry IV in 1073 allied with Pope Gregory VII in the Investiture Controversy and became one of the leading figures of the Great Saxon Revolt.

The history of the diocese down to 1208 is found in the Gesta episcoporum Halberstadensium.

=== Prince-bishopric ===
After the deposition of the Saxon duke Henry the Lion the episcopal and capitular temporalities forming the Stift of Halberstadt evolved to an Imperial State, the prince-bishopric. The political entity of the prince-bishopric only comprised parts of the ecclesiastical entity of the diocese, which also included neighbouring political entities of other rulers.

On the death of Henry VI in 1197, the prince-bishopric supported the unsuccessful claim of Philip of Swabia against Otto of Brunswick to be Holy Roman Emperor. When Pope Innocent III disagreed, Prince-Bishop Conrad of Halberstadt (Conrad of Krosigk before his elevation) was excommunicated. To evade the penalties of excommunication, Conrad joined the catastrophic Fourth Crusade. Taking full part in the diversion of the Crusade from its mission and the atrocious subsequent sack of Constantinople, Conrad enriched the Prince-Bishopric with many relics and other booty personally looted from the churches, convents, and monasteries of the Roman Imperial capital. In 1315 the prince-bishop acquired the former Principality of Aschersleben for the prince-bishopric.

=== Sede vacante ===
In 1479 the Saxon prince-elector Ernest of Wettin pushed the election of his 13-year-old son Ernest II, Archbishop of Magdeburg since 1476, as administrator in place of the resigned Prince-Bishop Gebhard von Hoym. In 1513 Albert of Hohenzollern, younger brother of Elector Joachim I Nestor of Brandenburg, succeeded him and the Magdeburg archbishops from the House of Hohenzollern remained administrators, while in 1540 the Halberstadt territories became Lutheran during the Reformation. In 1566 two-year-old Henry Julius of Brunswick-Wolfenbüttel became the first Lutheran administrator, after which Halberstadt's see was held by sons of the Princes of Wolfenbüttel, a line of the Welf Brunswick and Lunenburg ducal family, until in 1623 Henry Julius' son Christian, the "Mad Halberstadter", resigned during the Thirty Years' War. He was succeeded by Christian William of Brandenburg, son of Elector Joachim III Frederick of Brandenburg.

In political respect the prince-bishopric was secularised as the Principality of Halberstadt by the Peace of Westphalia of 1648, and finally given to the Hohenzollern rulers of Brandenburg-Prussia. After the 1815 Congress of Vienna, its territory was incorporated into the Prussian Province of Saxony.

In ecclesiastic respect the diocese, sede vacante since 1480, since represented by administrators only, who were even Protestants between 1552 and 1628, became defunct in 1648 too. So in 1669 the tiny remaining Catholic diaspora in the diocesan area of Halberstadt was put under the new jurisdiction of the Vicariate Apostolic of the Northern Missions. Between 1709 and 1780 the area of the former diocese of Halberstadt formed part of the Vicariate Apostolic of Upper and Lower Saxony, but afterwards returning to the Northern Missions. In 1821 the area of the former diocese of Halberstadt was merged into the Diocese of Paderborn, and forms part of the modern Diocese of Magdeburg since 1994.

== Geography ==
After the foundation of the ancient Archbishopric of Magdeburg, the Diocese of Halberstadt covered the following Saxon Gau counties: Balsamgau, Derlingau, the western part of the Nordthüringgau, Harzgau, Schwabengau, and Hassegau. Thus, it stretched from the Oker river near Hornburg in the west, where it bordered on the Bishopric of Hildesheim, to the Saale in the east. The city of Brunswick, located on both sides of the Oker, was originally split between Halberstadt and Hildesheim until it passed to Duke Henry the Lion in 1142, who made it his residence.

== Bishops of Halberstadt ==
Name	From	To
Hildegrim of Châlons	804	827
Thiatgrim	827	840
Haymo	840	853
Hildegrim II	853	886
Agiulf	886	894
Sigismund	894	923
Bernard	926	968
Hildeward	968	996
Arnulf	996	1023
Branthog	1023	1036
Burchard I	1036	1059
Burchard II	1059	1088
Hamezo (antibishop)	1085	1085
Dietmar	1089	1089
Herrand	1090	1102
Frederick I (antibishop)	1090	1106
Reinhard of Blankenburg	1107	1123
Otto von Kuditz	1123	1135
Rudolf	1136	1149
Ulrich	1149	1160
Gero von Schowitz	1160	1177
Ulrich	1177	1181
Dietrich von Krosigk	1181	1193
Gardolf von Harbke	1193	1201
Konrad von Krosigk	1201	1209
Frederick II of Kirchberg	1209	1236
Ludolf von Schladen	1236	1241
Meinard von Kranichfeld	1241	1252
Ludolf II von Schladen (not acknowledged by the pope)	1253	1255
Volrad von Kranichfeld	1254	1295
Hermann von Blankenburg	1296	1304
Albert I of Anhalt	1304	1324
Albert II of Brunswick-Lüneburg, son of Duke Albert the Fat	1324	1358
Giselbrecht von Holstein (antibishop)	1324	1343
Albrecht von Mansfeld (antibishop)	1346	1356
Louis of Meissen, son of Margrave Frederick II	1357	1366
Albert III of Saxony	1366	1390
Ernest I von Hohnstein	1391	1399
Rudolf of Anhalt	1401	1406
Heinrich von Warberg	1407	1411
Albert IV, son of Konrad IV, Count of Wernigerode	1411	1419
Johannes von Hoym	1419	1437
Buchard von Warberg	1437	1458
Gebhard von Hoym	1458	1479
Administrated by the Archbishops of Magdeburg		
Ernest II of Saxony	1480	1513
Albert of Mainz	1513	1545
Johann Albrecht of Brandenburg-Ansbach son of Margrave Frederick I	1545	1550
Frederick III of Brandenburg, son of Elector Joachim II Hector	1550	1552
Sigismund of Brandenburg, half-brother of Frederick III	1552	1566
Protestant administrators		
Henry Julius of Brunswick-Wolfenbüttel	1566	1613
Henry Charles of Brunswick	1613	1615
Rudolf of Brunswick	1615	1616
Christian of Brunswick-Wolfenbüttel	1616	1623
Christian William of Brandenburg, son of Elector Joachim Frederick	1624	1628
Catholic administrator		
Archduke Leopold Wilhelm of Austria (Catholic administrator due to lacking canonical qualification)	1628	1648

== Auxiliary bishops ==
- Johann Schedemeker, O.S.A. (1438–1452)
- Johannes Sartoris, O.F.M. (1459–1466)
- Hermann Molitoris, O.P. (1471–1483)
- Levinus Brunstorp, O.P. (1478–1487)
- Matthias Kanuti, O.S.B. (1492–1506)
- Heinrich Lenchker, O.P. (1514–1538)
- Michael Vehe, O.P. (1539)
- Johannes Mensing, O.P. (1539–1547)
- Johannes Alberti (bishop), O.P. (1550)

== See also ==
- Principality of Halberstadt
- List of Imperial Diet participants (1792)
- Buko von Halberstadt (folk song)
