= Walram (bishop of Naumburg) =

Walram or Galeran (died 12 April 1111) was the bishop of Naumburg from 1090 or 1091 until his death. He was involved in the Investiture Contest. He initially supported the emperor, but switched to the pope's side by 1105. He corresponded with Anselm of Canterbury on theological questions and wrote some hagiography.

== Life ==
Prior to becoming bishop, Walram was a canon of Bamberg Cathedral known for his scholarship.

On the death of Bishop Gunther in 1090, the canons of Naumburg Cathedral elected Abbot Frederick of Goseck as bishop. Since the election did not take place in his presence, the Emperor Henry IV quashed it. A delegation from Naumburg argued their case before the emperor on 30 November. On 25 December it was learned that the abbey of Hersfeld had fallen vacant. After Frederick accepted Hersfeld as compensation, Henry appointed Walram as bishop and invested him with the temporalities of his see.

During the Investiture Contest, Walram was initially a staunch supporter of Henry. He was still an imperialist when Archbishop Anselm of Canterbury addressed the first of two letters to him. By the summer of 1105, he, like all the other bishops in Saxony, had gone over to the side of Henry's rebellious son, Henry V. Walram announced his support for Pope Paschal II in a letter to Anselm in 1106. In February of that year, he was visiting the shrine church of Saint-Léonard-de-Noblat when Prince Bohemond of Taranto arrived as a pilgrim.

Around 1109, Walram had some forest near Taucha belonging to Zeitz Cathedral cleared and there founded and settled a village bearing the Slavic name Nuslize.

Walram died on 12 April 1111, as recorded in a Bamberg necrology.

== Works ==
All of Walram's surviving writings are either letters or hagiography.

In 1094 or 1095, Walram wrote a letter in defence of Henry IV, Epistola de causa Heinrici, addressed to Count Louis the Springer. Louis, in turn, asked Herrand of Halberstadt to write a reply. The correspondence is preserved in a 12th-century manuscript.

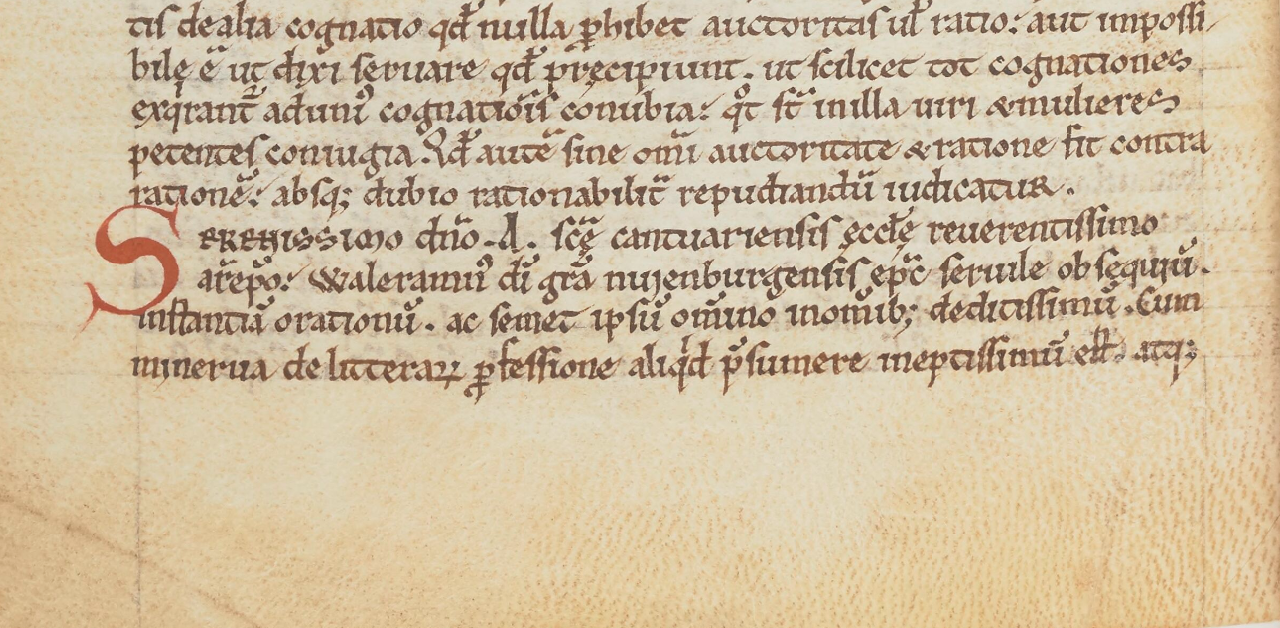
The rubricated initial S indicates the start of Walram's surviving letter to Anselm. His name (in the form Waleramni) is in the third line from the bottom.

The chronology of Walram's correspondence with Anselm—of which three letter's survive, two by Anselm and one of Walram's—is a matter of debate. Walram initiated the correspondence by asking him about the differences between Greek and Latin practices. As part of his response, Epistola de sacrificio azimo et fermentatis, Anselm sent Walram a copy of his treatise De processione Spiritus Sancti. He also answered questions about the azymite dispute and different rules on matrimony. His address to Walram, however, is cool, because he cannot be "sure Your Wisdom did not favour the successor of Julius Caesar and of Nero and of Julian the Apostate over the successor and Vicar of the Apostle Peter."

Walram's response to Anselm's first letter, Epistola Waleramni episcopi ad Anselmum, was preserved with Anselm's letters and circulated with them. Today, it is Epistle 416 in Anselm's collected correspondence. He asks four questions about the different means of administering the eucharist, the different blessings used, communion in one kind and the azymite dispute. His overriding concern is the unity of the global church, for "Palestine believes one thing about the sacraments of the Church, Armenia another, and our Rome and three-part Gaul still another." In Anselm's second letter, he briefly addresses these issues while also congratulating Walram for having changed sides in the investiture dispute.

Walram also wrote to his former cathedral in Bamberg about an unnamed excommunicate.

After his political change of sides, Walram wrote an account of the life and miracles of Leonard of Noblat, probably for Gertrude of Brunswick. It is preserved a single 12th-century manuscript, now in Trier, Bistumsarchiv, Abt. 95, Nr. 62. It is entitled Scriptum Galeranni episcopi de miraculo Boimundi ('Letter of Bishop Walram on the miracle of Bohemond'), but is also known as the Vita et miracula sancti Leonardi ('Life and miracles of Saint Leonard'). It is notable for including a contemporary account of Bohemond of Taranto's visit to Leonard's shrine at Noblat in 1106. Walram attributes to Bohemond a strongly worded critique of the Emperor Alexios I Komnenos.

Walram has been proposed as the author of two anonymous pro-imperial tracts, Liber de unitate ecclesiae conservanda ('Book on conserving the unity of the church') and De investitura episcoporum ('On episcopal investiture'). Neither attribution is generally accepted, and the latter is now attributed to Sigebert of Gembloux.

== Bibliography ==
- Fröhlich, Walter (1994). The Letters of Saint Anselm of Canterbury. Vol. 3. Cistercian Publications.
- Hopkins, Jasper; Richardson, Herbert, eds. (1976). Anselm of Canterbury. Vol. 3. Edwin Mellen Press.
- Melve, Leidulf (2007). Inventing the Public Sphere: The Public Debate During the Investiture Contest (c. 1030–1122). Brill.
- Müller, Reinhard (2017) [2007]. "Walram von Naumburg". Deutsches Literatur-Lexikon Online. De Gruyter.
- Rady, Martyn (1999). "The German Settlement in Central and Eastern Europe during the High Middle Ages". In Roger Bartlett; Karen Schönwälder (eds.). The German Lands and Eastern Europe: Essays on the History of their Social, Cultural and Political Relations. Macmillan. pp. 11–47. doi:10.1007/978-1-349-27094-1. ISBN 978-1-349-27096-5.
- Richardson, J. N. (2015). "Between the Limousin and the Holy Land: Prisoners, Performance, and the Portal of San Leonardo at Siponto". Gesta. 54 (2): 165–194. doi:10.1086/681953.
- Robinson, I. S. (2004) [1999]. Henry IV of Germany, 1056–1106. Cambridge University Press.
- Rubenstein, Jay (2019). Nebuchadnezzar's Dream: The Crusades, Apocalyptic Prophecy, and the End of History. Oxford University Press.
- Russo, Luigi (2005). "Il viaggio di Boemondo d'Altavilla in Francia (1106): un riesame". Archivio Storico Italiano. 163 (1): 3–42. JSTOR 26231377.
- Sharpe, Richard (2009). "Anselm as Author: Publishing in the Late Eleventh Century". The Journal of Medieval Latin. 19: 1–87. doi:10.1484/J.JML.1.100545. JSTOR 45020122.
- Stone, Gerald (2016). Slav Outposts in Central European History: The Wends, Sorbs and Kashubs. Bloomsbury.
- Theotokis, Georgios (2020). Bohemond of Taranto: Crusader and Conqueror. Pen & Sword Military.
- Vaughn, Sally N. (2012). Archbishop Anselm, 1093–1109: Bec Missionary, Canterbury Primate, Patriarch of Another World. Ashgate.
