= Wiegenlied (Des Knaben Wunderhorn) =

German folksong

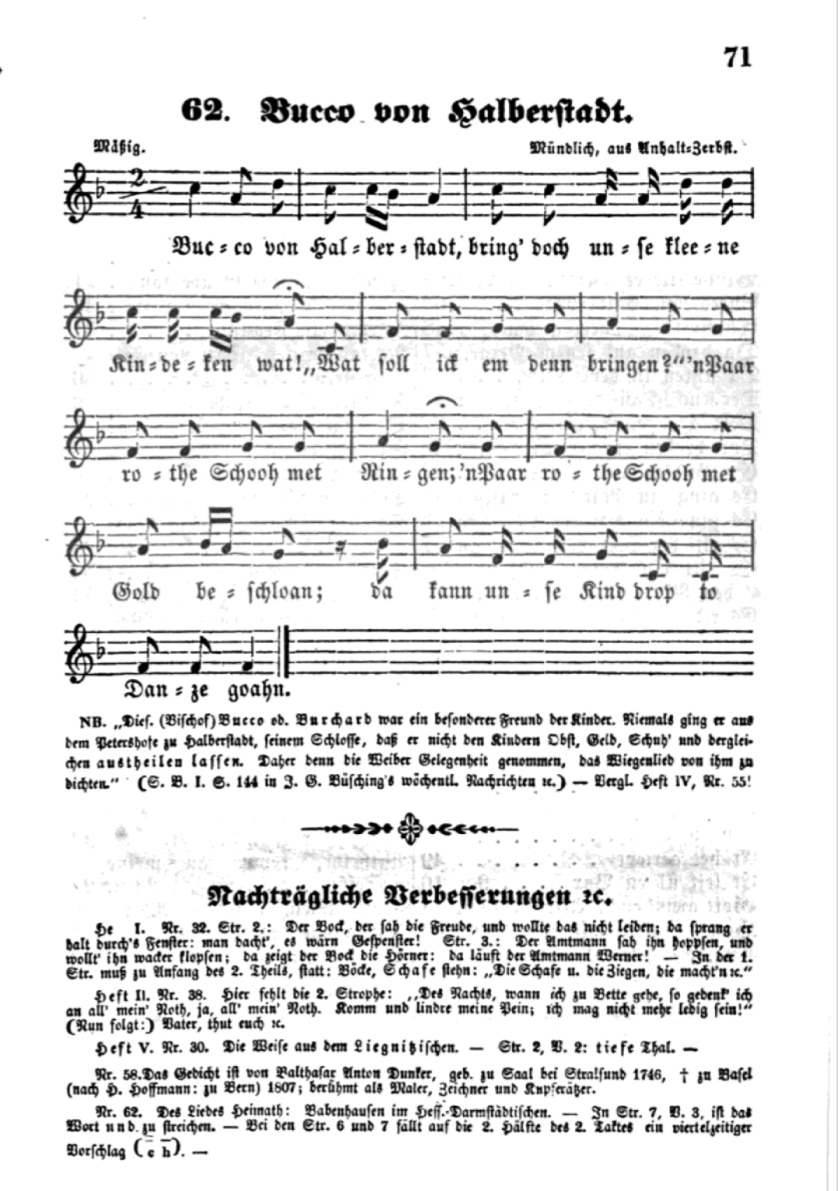
- Text and melody, published in 1843

Song
- Language: German
- English title: A Lullaby
- Published: not later than 1732
- Genre: Folk
- Songwriter(s): Traditional

"Wiegenlied" (German for 'lullaby') is a cradle song from the collection of German folkloric poems Des Knaben Wunderhorn.

According to a number of sources, the song features Burchard (Bishop of Halberstadt) (c. 1028–1088) under the name of "Buko von Halberstadt", who was a "friend of children" and never left his castle without some gifts for his young parishioners. Other authors call him "one of the most popular people of his time" (German: vielleicht der populärste seiner Zeit).

The poem about Buko of Halberstadt became widely known in the Saxon lands. One of the researchers notes that the work was first published in 1732 in the "Collection of some old chronicles" (Sammlung etlicher alter Chronicken) by Johann Winnigstedt.

== Words ==
Over the years and across regions, different texts have been used for the song. This is the text from Des Knaben Wunderhorn.

Buko von Halberstadt,
bring doch meinem Kinde was.
Was soll ich ihm bringen?
Rote Schuh mit Ringen,
schöne Schuh mit Gold beschlagen,
die soll unser Kindchen tragen.

Hurraso, Burra fort,
Wagen und schön Schuh sind fort,
stecken tief im Sumpfe,
Pferde sind ertrunken,
hurra, schrei nicht Reitersknecht,
warum fährst du auch so schlecht!

Buko von Halberstadt,
bring please something for my child.
What shall I bring him?
Red shoes with rings,
Beautiful shoes with golden hobnails,
that should our child wear.

Hurraso, Burra away,
carriage and beuatiful shoes are gone,
they are stuck deep in the swamp,
horses have drowned,
hurrah, scream not, horseman's servant,
why do you drive so badly?
