= Krodo =

Saxon God

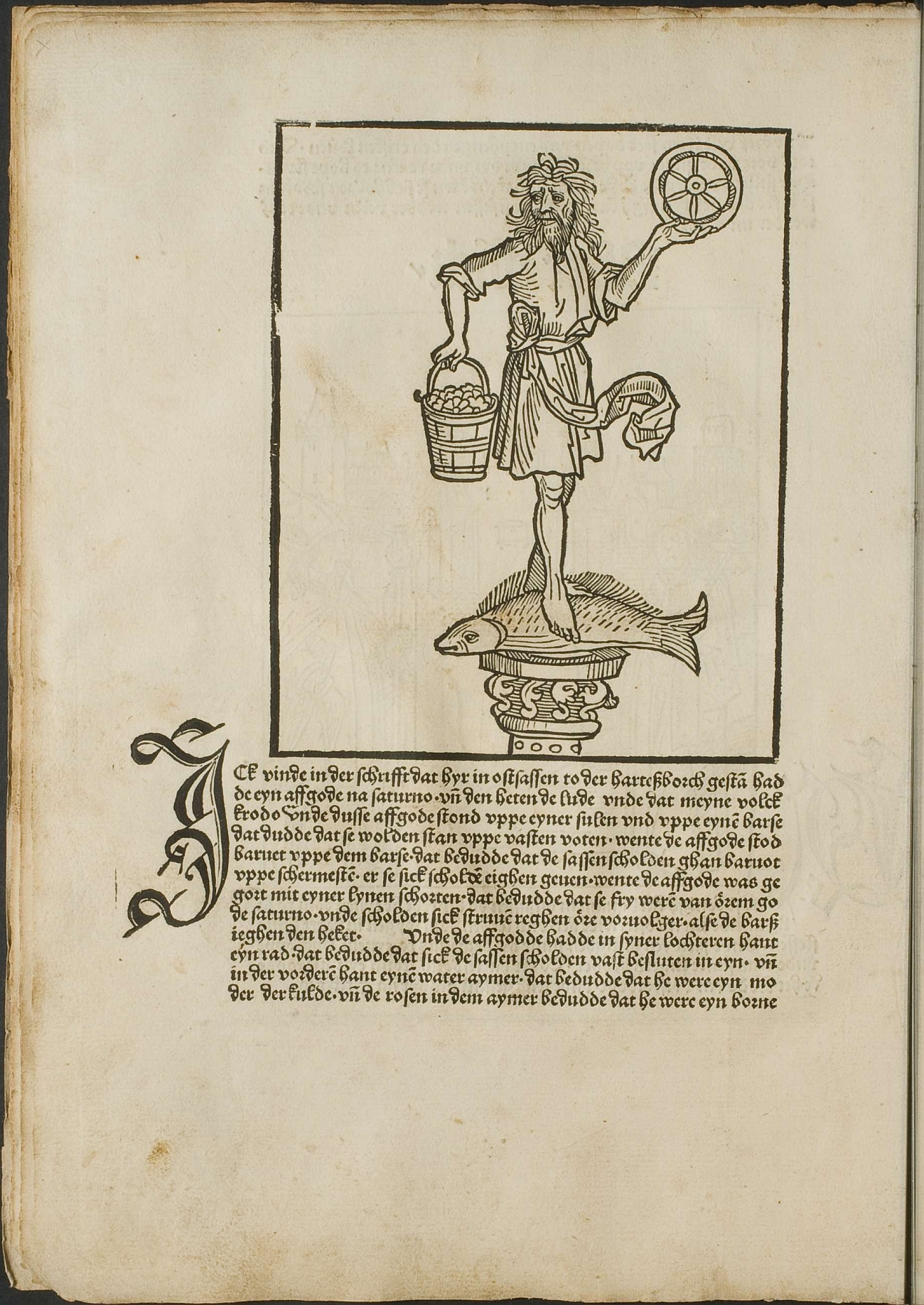
Illustration, Saxon Chronicle, 1492

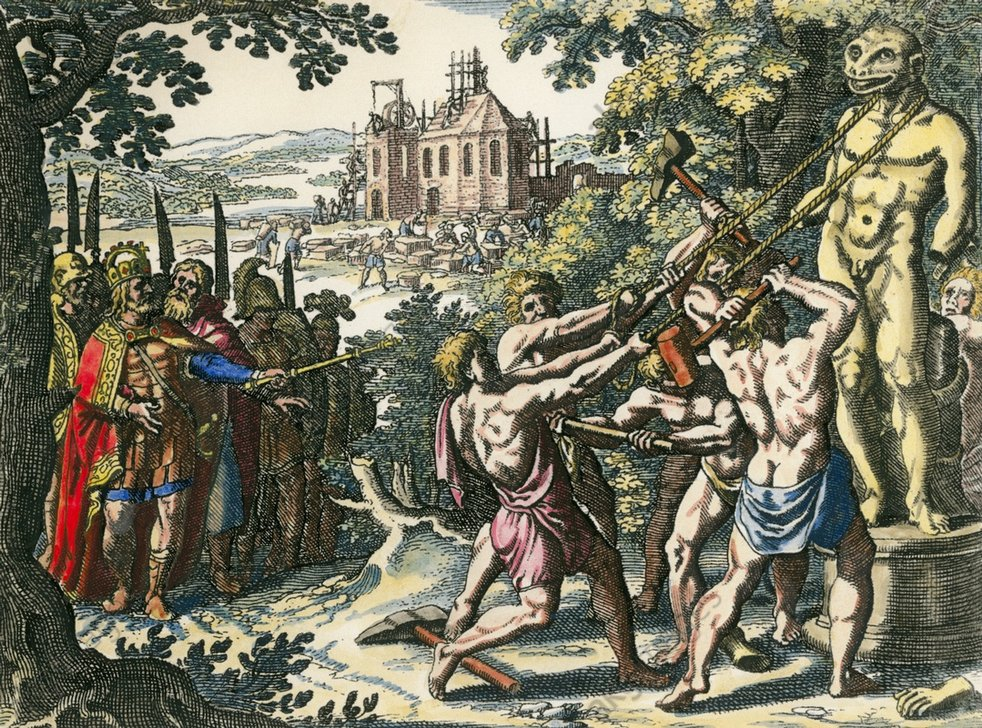
17th-century engraving depicting Charlemagne ordering a statue of Krodo destroyed

Krodo was a purported Germanic god of the Saxons, according to the 1492 Saxon Chronicle incunable probably written by the Brunswick goldsmith Conrad Bothe (c. 1475 – c. 1501) and printed in the studio of Peter Schöffer at Mainz. He is supposed to have been similar to the Roman god Saturn. Modern historians characterize the figure of Krodo as a fake (Janzen 2017).

== Description ==
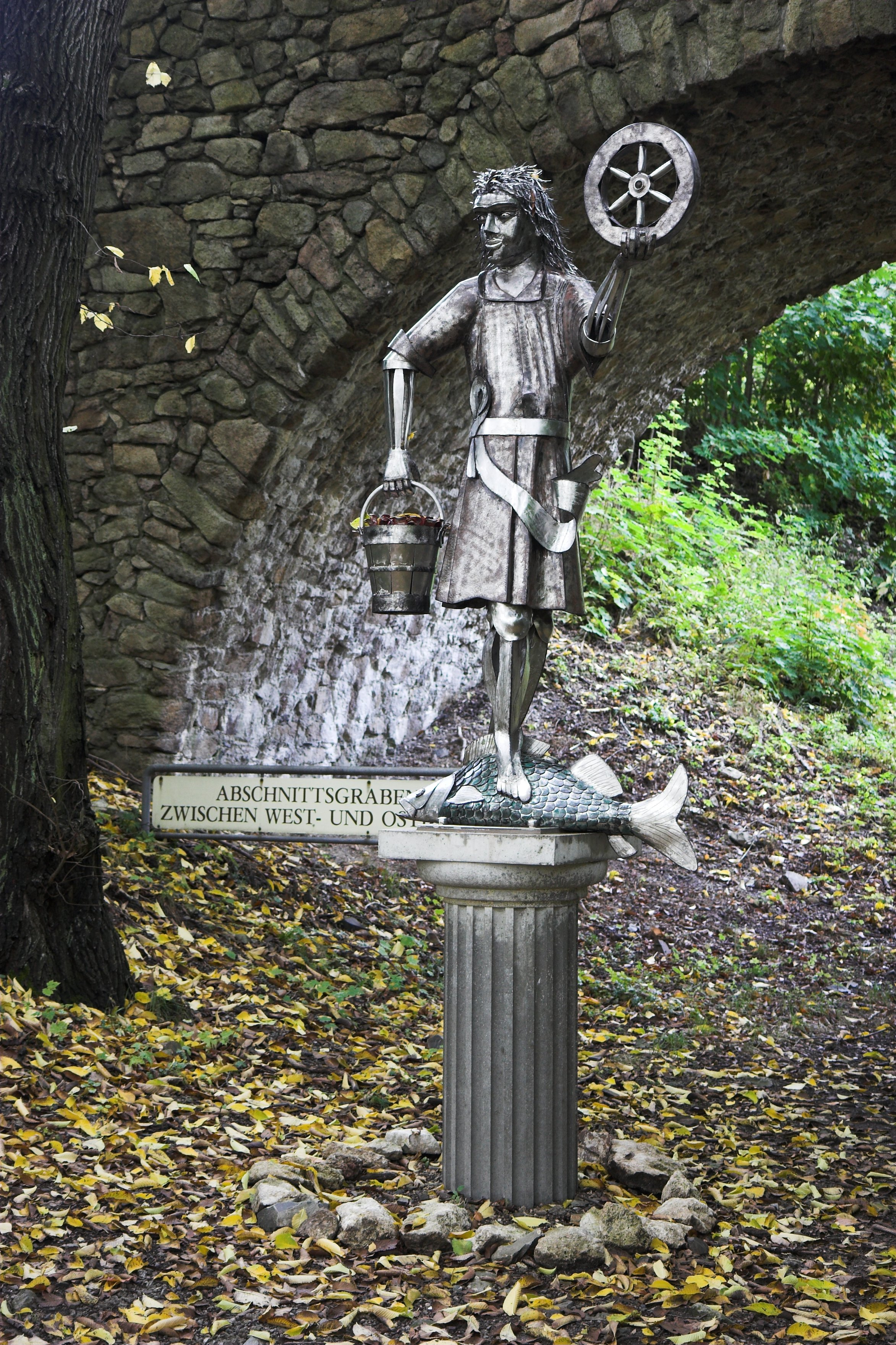
Rebuilt Krodo statue at Harzburg Castle

The Saxon Chronicle (written in Middle Low German: Cronecken der Sassen) contains a fanciful illustration of Krodo as a man clad in a linen garment with a wafting belt, who is standing on a large fish (a bass or perch) holding a bucket of roses in his right hand and an upright wheel in his left. The symbols possibly refer to the ancient four elements, though numerous further attempts at an interpretation have been given. According to Bothe, Julius Caesar during the conquests of Magna Germania ordered the erection of several fortresses crowned by statues of Roman deities; one of them was dedicated to Saturn–named Krodo by the local population–and stood at the site of later Harzburg Castle. When in 780, during the Saxon Wars, the Frankish king Charlemagne occupied the region he allegedly had the pagan statue destroyed in the course of the Christianization of the Saxon people.

Bothe's account was already rejected as a fable by contemporary scholars such as Albert Krantz (c. 1450 – 1517). As the 15th century Saxon Chronicle is the first and only source, the existence of Krodo today is generally considered doubtful along with other supposed Germanic gods, such as Stuffo. Although his annals are obviously based on earlier chronicles like the Sächsische Weltchronik, Bothe himself renders no references or sources of his assumption. Nevertheless the nearby Goslar collegiate church contained the so-called Krodo Altar, which probably dates back to the 11th century and may have been transferred from Harzburg Castle by Emperor Henry III to his Imperial Palace of Goslar about 1047. In German folklore the tales of the pagan Krodo idol (Götze Crodo) were passed down apparently as a subject in the region of the villages of Götzenthal and Grotenleide near the Upper Saxon town of Meerane.

In the spa resort of Bad Harzburg several streets and public institutions are named after Krodo. The town advertises itself today using the figure as a mascot. A replica statue was erected at Harzburg Castle in 2007.

== Sources ==
- Vollmer, Wilhelm: Wörterbuch der Mythologie. Stuttgart 1874, p. 302.
- J.A.E. Köhler: Das Sagenbuch des Erzgebirges, 1886
