= Sachsenbrunnen =

Coordinates: 51.868724°N 10.578488°E

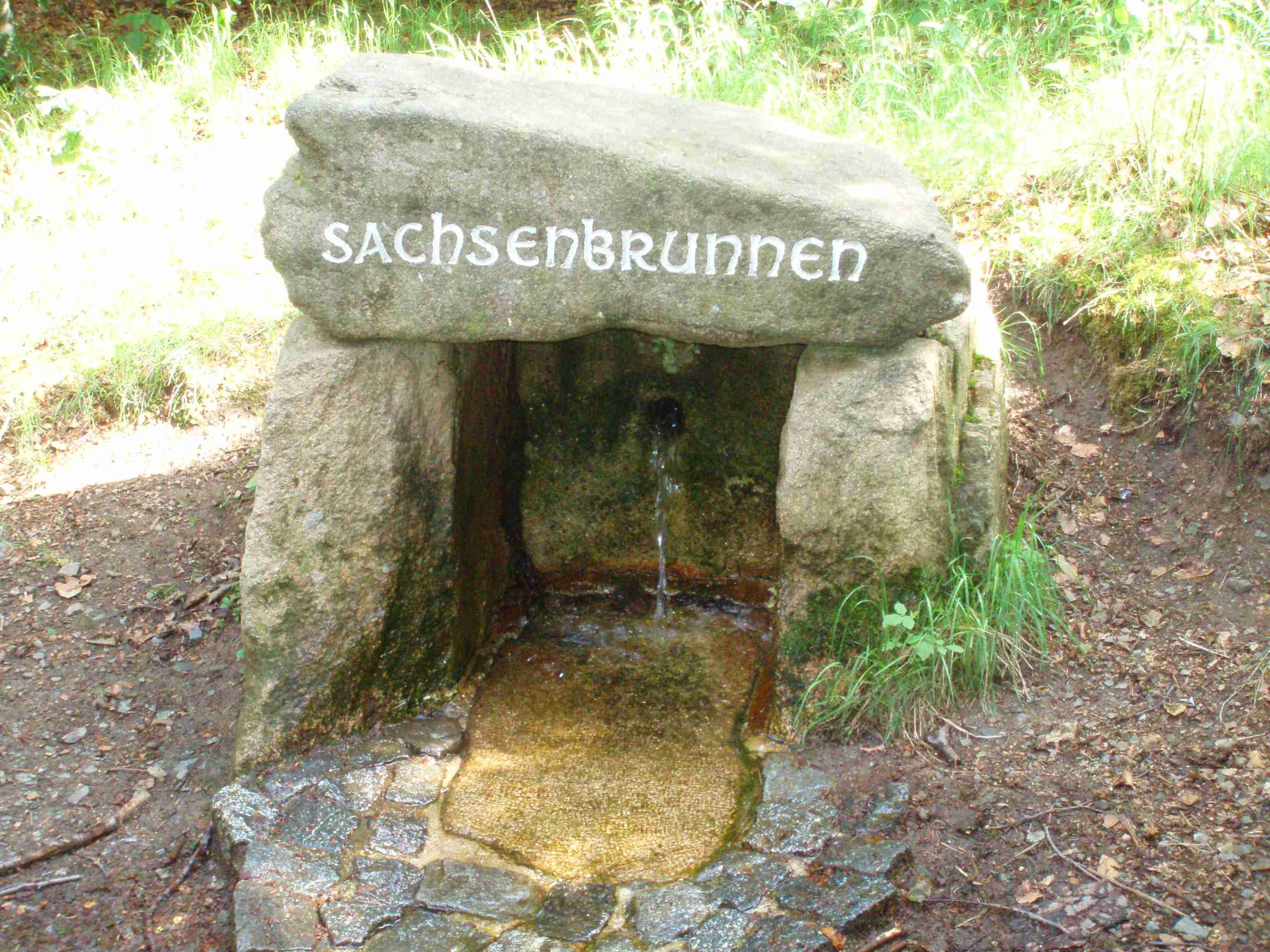
The Sachsenbrunnen

The Sachsenbrunnen is an enclosed spring at the Säperstelle near Bad Harzburg in the Harz Mountains of Germany. It is located on the Emperor Way (Kaiserweg) south of the spa town. From here drinking water was piped to castle of Harzburg over several hundred metres of clay tubes in the Middle Ages and Early Modern Period.

The Säperstelle is checkpoint no. 121 in the Harzer Wandernadel hiking network.
