= Louis the Springer =

Count in Thuringia

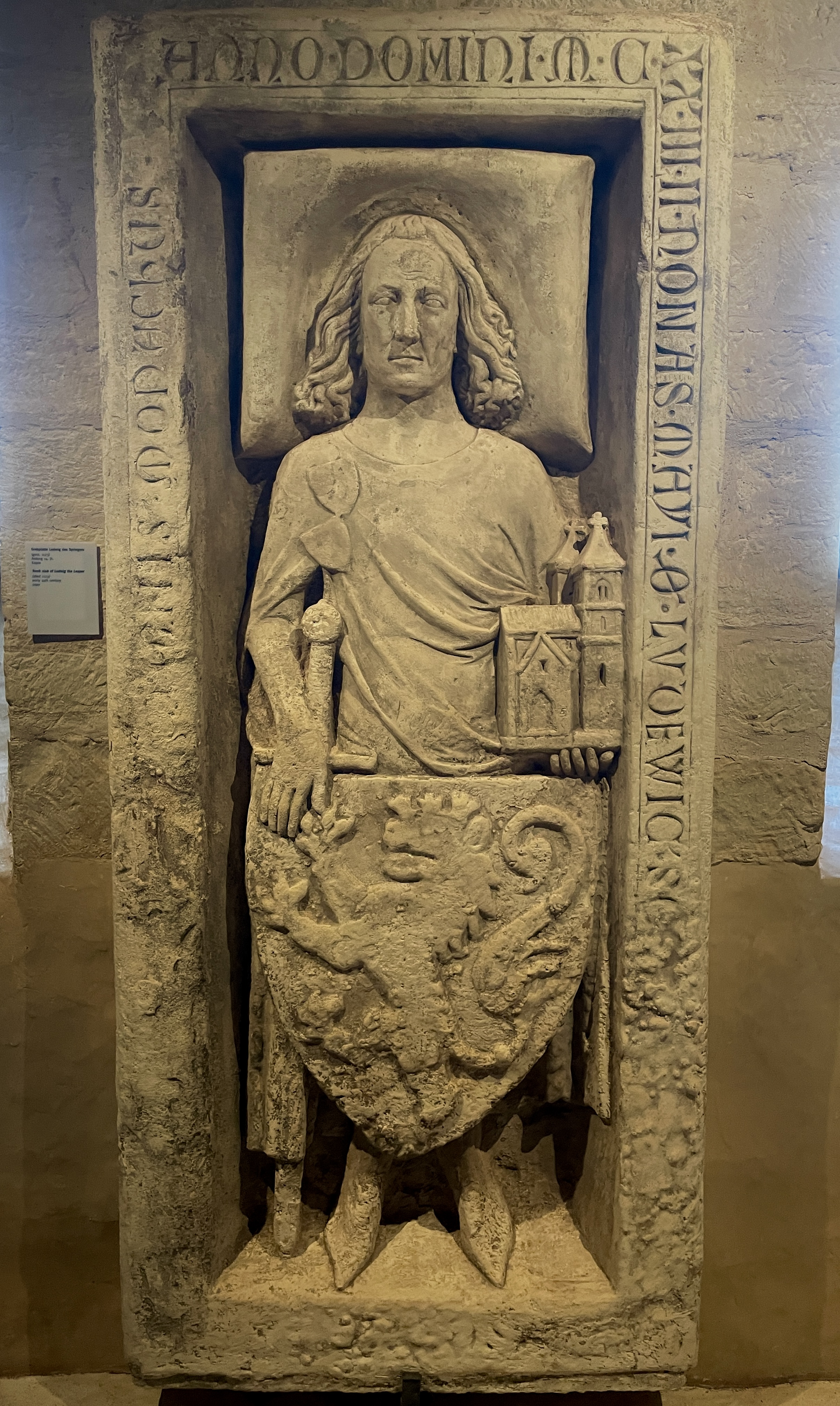
- Louis' grave stone in the Wartburg
- Born: c. 1042
- Died: 1123
- Buried: Wartburg
- Noble family: Ludovingians
- Spouse: Adelheid of Stade
- Issue Detail: Louis I, Landgrave of Thuringia
- Father: Louis the Bearded
- Mother: Cecily of Sangerhausen

Louis the Springer (German: Ludwig der Springer), sometimes called Louis the Jumper or Louis the Leaper, was a German nobleman and count in Thuringia from the death of his father until his own death on 8 May 1123. Little is known about him, although he is mentioned in many legends. He was a prominent opponent of the Salian emperors Henry IV and Henry V during the Investiture Controversy.

== Life ==
Louis was a son of Louis the Bearded and a member of the Franconian noble Ludowingians dynasty. He was baptized in the parish church in Altenbergen (today part of Leinatal). Around 1080, Louis and his brother Beringe founded the Schönrain Priory. In a document dated 1100, the two brothers are called "of Schauenburg", after a castle which their father had built near Friedrichroda.

Louis continued the policy of his father of expanding his influence into the Thuringian Basin by founding castles and monasteries. His marriage to Adelheid of Stade, widow of the Saxon count palatine Frederick III, brought him into the highest levels of the German aristocracy. Louis built the castles of Wartburg, which became the nucleus of the Landgraviate of Thuringia, around 1080 and Neuenburg around 1100. Louis himself did not use the title of landgrave; his son Louis I was the first member of the dynasty to use that title.

During the Great Saxon Revolt, Louis first sided with Emperor Henry IV, who probably made him a count in 1080. Later, he supported the future archbishop Ruthard of Mainz against the king. In 1085, he founded the monastery of Reinhardsbrunn with monks from Hirsau Abbey. In 1092, Pope Urban II confirmed him as advocatus of the monastery and exempted the monastery of episcopal jurisdiction, making it subject only to the Holy See. In 1094, Urban granted it the right to freely elect its abbot.

In 1094 or 1095, Bishop Walram of Naumburg wrote to Louis to persuade him to return to the emperor's side, but Louis had Bishop Herrand of Halberstadt give a reply to the learned bishop on his behalf.

Wolfgang Hartmann has proposed the hypothesis that, considering his hostile stance towards the Salians, among the statues of famous church founders in the Naumburg Cathedral there must be statues of Louis and his wife.

== Legend ==
According to legend, Louis received his nickname "the Jumper" when he boldly leaped into a river. He was attempting to take possession of the County Palatine of Saxony, that is, the area west of the river Saale and north of the Unstrut. To this end, he stabbed the ruling Count Palatine, Frederick III. He was arrested and incarcerated in Giebichenstein Castle in Halle. After three years in captivity, he expected to be executed. He escaped by leaping from the castle tower into the river Saale, where a servant was waiting for him with a boat and his favourite horse, a snow-white horse named Swan. As atonement for murdering Frederick, he built the St. Ulrici church in Sangerhausen and later he founded Reinhardsbrunn Abbey.

Another legend relates how he came to build the Wartburg. He found the location in 1067, while he was hunting in the area. He saw the mountain and exclaimed: Wait, mountain, thou shalt bear me a castle!. However, this mountain was outside his territory. To circumvent this problem, he had his men carry dirt from his own territory and dump it on the mountain. He then had twelve of his most loyal knights stand on that spot, stick their swords in the ground and swear that the soil they were standing on, rightfully belonged to Louis.

== Marriage and issue ==
Louis married Adelheid of Stade, the widow of Frederick III of Goseck, Count Palatine of Saxony and daughter of Lothair Udo II. Together, they had the following children:

- Herman
- Louis I (d. 1140)
- Henry Raspe I (d. 1130)
- Udo I, bishop of Naumburg (d. 1148)
- Kunigunde
- Cicilia (d. 1141), married Count Gerlach I of Veldenz
- Adelaide, married Ulric II, Margrave of Carniola
- Conrad

== Bibliography ==
- Wilfried Warsitzka: Die Thüringer Landgrafen, Verlag Dr. Bussert & Stadeler, 2002, ISBN 3932906225
- Wolfgang Hartmann: Vom Main zur Burg Trifels — vom Kloster Hirsau zum Naumburger Dom. Auf hochmittelalterlichen Spuren des fränkischen Adelsgeschlechts der Reginbodonen, in the series Veröffentlichungen des Geschichts- und Kunstvereins Aschaffenburg e.V., vol. 52, Aschaffenburg, 2004.
- Karl Robert Wenck (1884). "Ludwig der Springer" . Allgemeine Deutsche Biographie (in German). Vol. 19. Leipzig: Duncker & Humblot. pp. 589–590.
