= Hildegrim of Châlons =

Hildegrim (c. 750 – 19 June 827) was Bishop of Châlons from 804 to 810 and the second abbot of Werden Abbey, after his elder brother Ludger, from 809 until his death.

== Life ==
Like his brother Ludger, Hildegrim was of Christian Frisian noble descent. He presumably stayed at the Benedictine abbey of Monte Cassino and received a thorough liberal arts education at the Utrecht Cathedral School, founded by Bishop Gregory, and in York under Alcuin. Mentioned as deacon in 793, he was ordained a priest three years later.

About 804 he became Bishop of Châlons. Upon Ludger's death in 809, he succeeded him as Abbot of Werden and Helmstedt in 809.

He is also traditionally named as the first Bishop of Halberstadt, a position now discounted by scholars; nevertheless, Hildegrim is known to have been active in spreading Christianity as a missionary into the Osterwieck and Halberstadt region after the Saxon Wars of Charlemagne.

Hildegrim is buried in the crypt of Werden Abbey church. He is a Catholic and Orthodox saint, remembered on June 19.
