= Burchard II (bishop of Halberstadt) =

German cleric and Bishop of Halberstadt (c.1028–1088)

Buchard II
- Bishop of Halberstadt
- Appointed: 1059
- Term ended: 7 April 1088
- Predecessor: Burchard I
- Successor: Hamezo
- Other post: Provost of Collegiate Church of St. Simon and St. Jude

Personal details
- Died: 7 April 1088
- Denomination: Roman Catholic

Burchard of Veltheim (also Burckhardt, Bucco, or Buko; c. 1028 – 7 April 1088) was a German cleric and Bishop of Halberstadt (as Burchard II) from 1059 until his death.

A member of the Veltheim noble family, possibly of Swabian origin, Burchard was a maternal nephew of the archbishops Anno II of Cologne and Werner of Magdeburg. In 1057, he became provost of the Collegiate Church of St. Simon and St. Jude at the Imperial Palace of Goslar. In 1059, through the intervention of his uncle, Archbishop Anno, he succeeded Bishop Burchard I in the diocese of Halberstadt.

In October 1062, it was the decision of a German-Italian synod held at Augsburg to send Burchard, high in the favour of Empress dowager Agnes of Poitou, to Rome to mediate a disputed Papal election between the legitimate Pope Alexander II and the Antipope Honorius II. Although the German crown stood by Honorius, Burchard vowed to stand by Hildebrand, the great Papal reformer, and supported Alexander. In gratitude, Alexander bestowed on Burchard the coveted pallium.

In the dead of winter 1067–1068, Burchard, crossing frozen marshland, invaded the country of the Slavic Lutici tribes. His forces razed the pagan temple at Rethra (Radagoszcz), and the bishop returned to Saxony riding the sacred black horse.

In 1070, he founded the Benedictine abbey of Huysburg. In Halberstadt, he consecrated the rebuilt Cathedral at Pentecost 1071. King Henry IV witnessed the ceremony, at the same time he accepted the subjugation by the rebellious Saxon noble Otto of Nordheim and his followers.

However, when the Saxon Rebellion broke out two years later, Bishop Burchard sided with the rebels against Henry IV. He acted as a witness at the 1074 Treaty of Gerstungen, but on 13 July 1075, he was captured at Homburg an der Unstrut and handed over to Bishop Rupert of Bamberg. In 1076, he was banished to Hungary, but he escaped and returned to Halberstadt. In the ongoing Investiture Controversy, Bishop Burchard sided with every imperial opponent of Henry IV, including the anti-kings Rudolf of Rheinfelden and Herman of Salm. After a resolution in 1085, Emperor Henry invaded the Halberstadt territory and sought to depose Burchard at the synod of Mainz, but he was only briefly successful in removing him from his diocese. On 5 June 1087, Burchard consecrated the Ilsenburg Abbey church after nine years of work.

According to legend, Bishop Burchard was very fond of children. As late as the early twentieth century, children of the region around Halberstadt still sang Low German nursery rhymes in his memory:

Buko von Halberstadt,
Bring doch meinen Kinde wat.
"Wat sall ik em denn bringen?"
"Goldne Schoh mit Ringen."

Buko of Halberstadt,
Bring something to my child.
"What shall I bring to him?"
"Golden shoes with buckles."

Finally, Burchard entered into a fierce dispute with the Brunonid margrave Egbert II of Meissen, who sought to be elected anti-king in succession to Hermann of Salm. According to the Annalista Saxo, Egbert's troops devastated the Halberstadt lands and the bishop sought support from the Saxon nobles in Goslar. On 6 April 1088, he was mortally wounded in a skirmish and was brought to the Ilsenburg monastery, where he succumbed to his injuries the next day.

== Sources ==
- Thompson, James Westfall (1928). Feudal Germany, Volume II. New York: Frederick Ungar Publishing.

== Notes ==
Preceded by Burchard I	Bishop of Halberstadt; 1059–1088	Succeeded by Hamezo
