= Johannes Mensing =

German theologian (1477–1547)

Johannes Mensing (Mensingk) (1477–1547) was a German Dominican theologian and controversialist, an opponent of Martin Luther. He was considered formidable for his theological knowledge and command of the German language.

== Life ==
Mensing was born at Zutphen or Zwolle, Netherlands. In 1495, he entered the Dominican Order and made part of his theological studies in the studium of his province. Matriculating at the University of Wittenberg in 1515, he received there in 1517 the licentiate in theology, and the following year received in Frankfort-on-the-Oder the doctorate in theology from the hands of the general of his order. According to Quétif, he taught theology in 1514 in the monastery at Ulm;, but it is however improbable that Mensing, belonging to the province of Saxony, should act as professor in another province which had no studium generale of its own.

To prevent Lutheran doctrinal innovations from gaining a foothold in his province, Mensing entered into all the controversies. From 1522 to 1524, he occupied the pulpit in the cathedral of Magdeburg, where he also composed his first apologetic works on the Sacrifice of the Mass. He was forced to leave, and took up the invitation of the Princess Margaretha von Anhalt, who ruled during the minority of her sons; he went to Dessau to support her in her efforts against Protestants in her territory.

In 1529, he was professor in the University of Frankfort-on-the-Oder and preacher in the cathedral. The following year he attended, as theologian to the Elector Joachim von Anhalt, the Diet of Augsburg, and secured from Emperor Charles V a renewal of the letter of protection for the Dominican Order in Germany which Emperor Charles IV had granted them in 1355 and 1359.

In 1534, he was elected provincial of his own province, but before the termination of his office Pope Paul III made him suffragan Bishop of Halberstadt. In 1540 and 1541, he attended the theological conferences of Worms and Ratisbon, where with Johann Eck, the vice-chancellor of the University of Ingolstadt, and Pelargus, he took a leading part in the deliberations.

== Works ==
A complete list of his works, all of which bear a polemical tinge, is given by Streber in the Kirchenlexikon.
