= Halberstadt Cathedral =

Coordinates: 51°53′46″N 11°2′57″E

- Church of St Stephen and St Sixtus
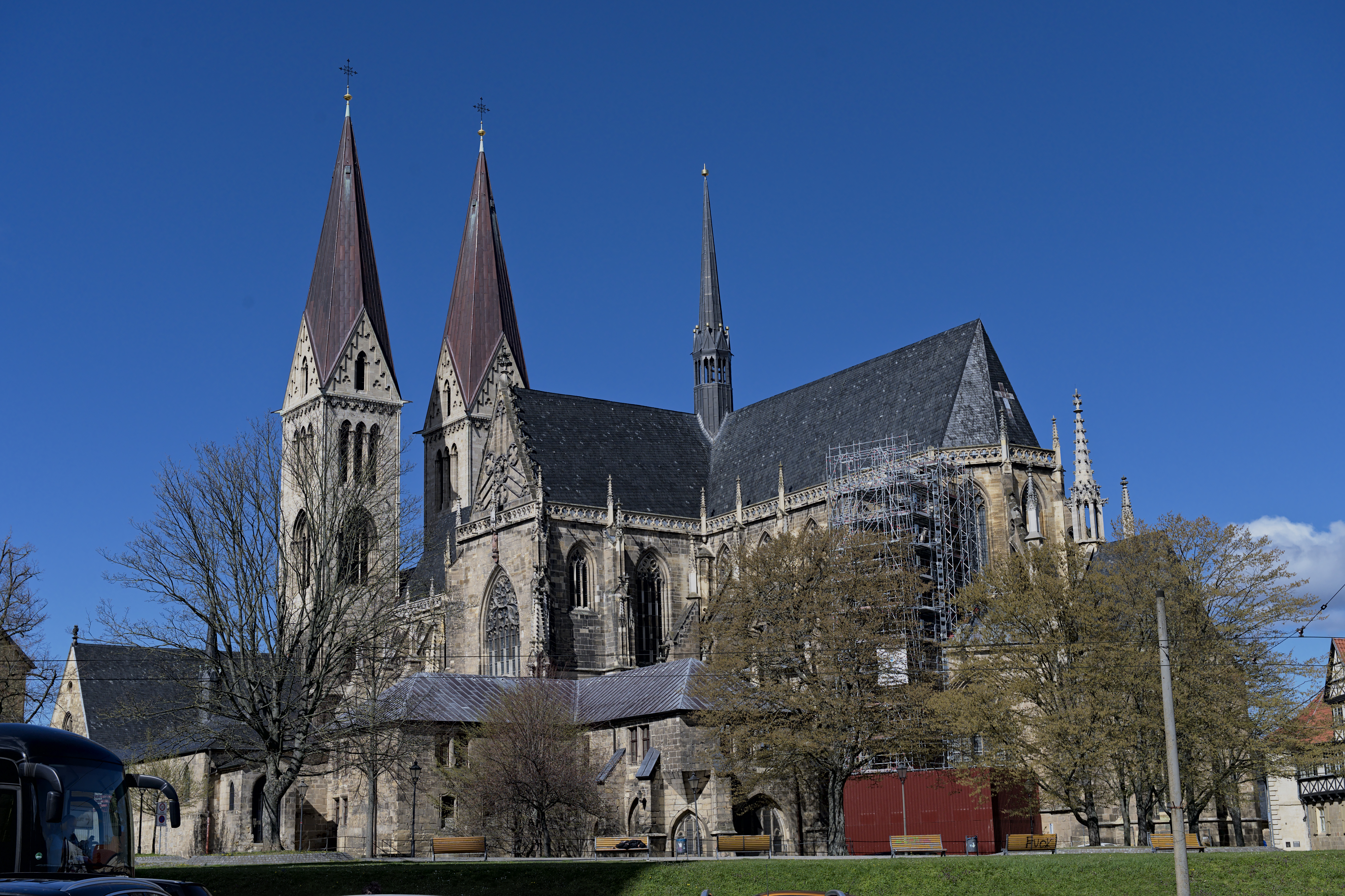
- Halberstadt Cathedral
- Halberstadt Cathedral
- Country: Germany
- Denomination: Evangelical
- Previous denomination: Roman Catholic

Architecture
- Architectural type: Gothic
- Years built: 1236 - 1491

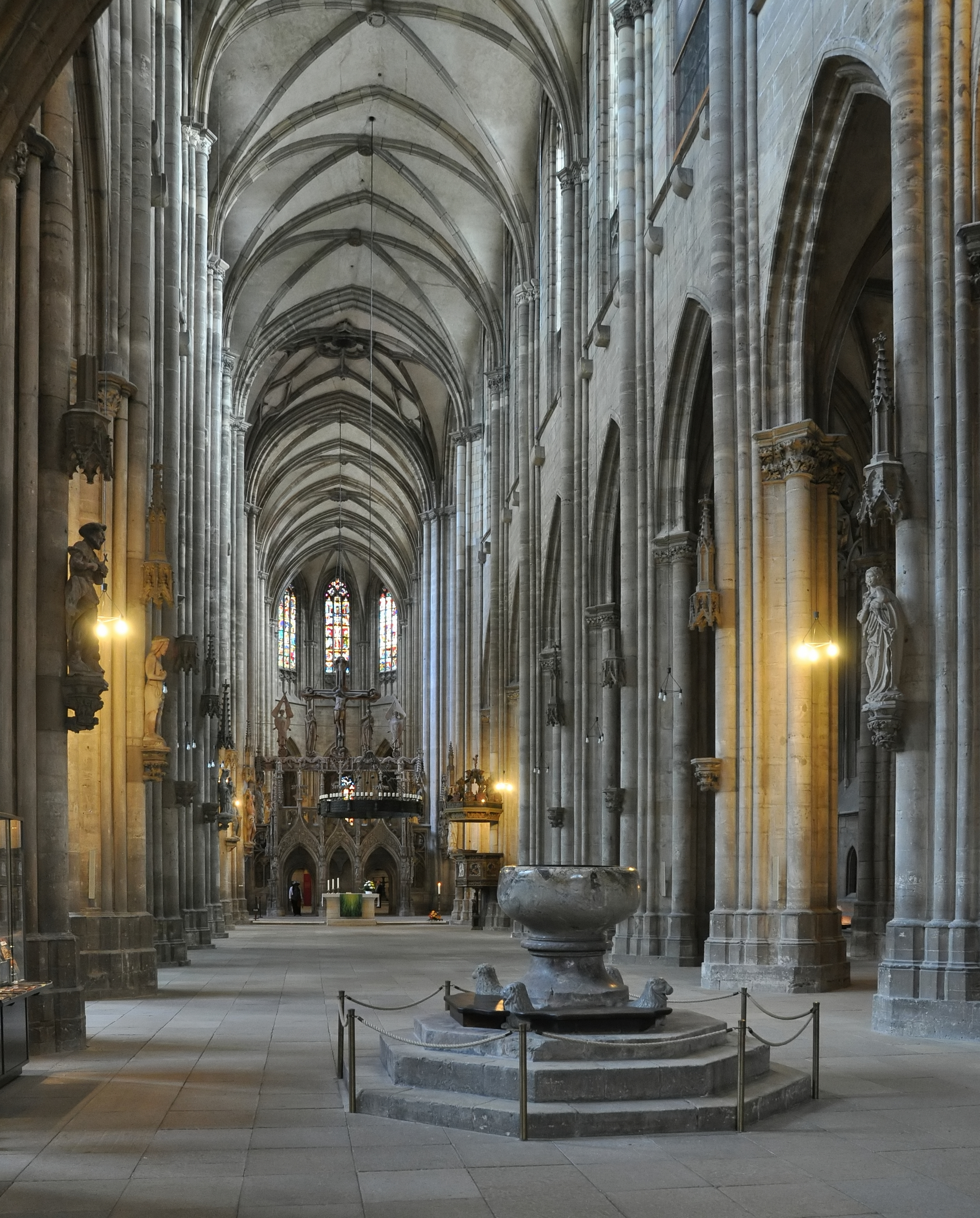
Inside view, looking east

The Halberstadt Cathedral or Church of St Stephen and St Sixtus (German: Dom zu Halberstadt) is a Gothic church in Halberstadt in Saxony-Anhalt, Germany. It was the episcopal see of the Bishopric of Halberstadt, established by Emperor Charlemagne in 804. The present-day church, which replaced an older Romanesque church, was built between 1236 and 1491 in a Gothic style, clearly inspired by the French Gothic cathedrals. In 1591 the Bishop of Halberstadt joined the Protestant Reformation, and the church has been used by the Protestant Church since. The cathedral was severely damaged in the Second World War, but has been restored in the decades after the war.

The cathedral retains much of its medieval decoration and stained glass windows. The large cathedral treasury contains over 600 objects of art, dating from the 5th to the 18th century, including a unique textiles collection. Many very valuable items are of Byzantine origin, having been brought to Halberstadt in 1205 by Bishop Konrad von Krosigk who had participated in the Fourth Crusade's sack of Constantinople.

An organ was installed in the cathedral in 1361, and is believed to be the first example of an organ with a modern chromatic keyboard. In 2000, the time elapsed since the organ's installation—639 years—was chosen to be the length of a performance of American composer John Cage's As Slow as Possible. The performance began in 2001 at the St. Burchardi church in Halberstadt, and is due to end in the year 2640.

The cathedral is currently used by the Evangelical Church in Central Germany.
