= Bettingerode =

Village in Germany

- Ortsteil of Bad Harzburg
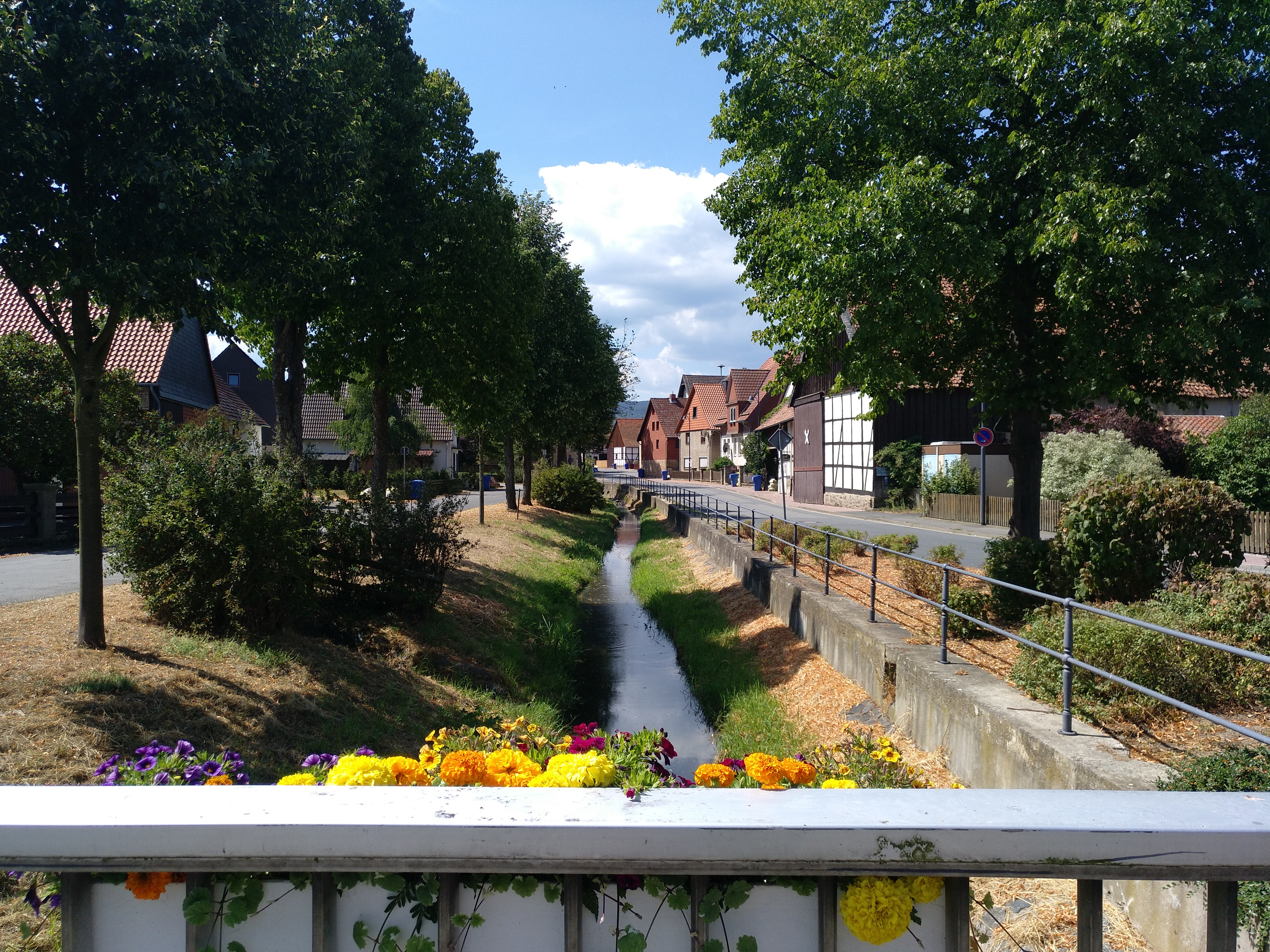
- Schamlah river in Bettingerode, 2018
- Interactive map of Bettingerode
- Location within Germany Location within Lower Saxony
- Coordinates: 51°54′47″N 10°34′20″E
- Country: Germany
- State: Lower Saxony
- District: Goslar
- Town: Bad Harzburg

Population (2020-12-31)
  - Total: 402
- Time zone: UTC+01:00 (CET)
  - Summer (DST): UTC+02:00 (CEST)
- Postal codes: 38667
- Dialling codes: 05322
- Vehicle registration: GS

Bettingerode (German pronunciation: [ˈbɛ.tɪŋə.ˌʁoːdə]) is a village that forms a municipal district of Bad Harzburg in the district of Goslar in Lower Saxony. As of 2020, Bettingerode had a population of 402.

== Geography ==
Bettingerode lies between Bad Harzburg downtown and Vienenburg, part of the community of Goslar, between 175 and 190 m above sea level (NHN), in the sparsely populated eastern half of Bad Harzburg and a few kilometers north of the Harz mountains. The village is penetrated by the Schamlah, a tributary of the Ecker.

=== Infrastructure ===
District roads connect Bettingerode to Harlingerode/Radau Estate to the west, Lochtum to the north, Eckertal to the east, and Westerode to the south. The A 369 has an exit one kilometer west of Bettingerode.

== History ==
Historical populations
Year	Pop.	±%
1798	329	—
1818	387	+17.6%
1852	506	+30.7%
1877	541	+6.9%
1910	601	+11.1%
1925	566	−5.8%
1939	529	−6.5%
1949	986	+86.4%
1965	740	−24.9%
2005	487	−34.2%
2010	453	−7.0%
2015	435	−4.0%
2017	440	+1.1%
2020	402	−8.6%
1798, 1818, 1852, 1877, 1885–1939, 1910, 1949 und 1965, thereafter.

=== Etymology ===
The name Bettingerode means "Clearing of the people of Bado". The name of the founder is based on the Germanic root *badwō "battle, fight", and cognates with Old English beadu and Old Norse bǫð. The -ingerode prefix is a common indicator for clearing between the 9th and 11th century in Eastphalia and is a usual ending for villages in this region (Göttingerode, Harlingerode, etc.).

Bettingerode was first mentioned in 1013 as Redingaroth, assumingly a misspelling of Bedingaroth. Further mentions are:

- 1018: Beddinge
- 1129: Botingeroth
- 1174-1195: Bettingeroth
- 1265: Bettingerod
- 13th/14th century: Bettingerode, Bedtingerode, Bedtingerode, Bettyngerode

=== Timeline ===
The oldest building in Bettingerode as well as in Bad Harzburg is the town church that was constructed around 1200. Between 15th and 16th century, the villages Bintingerode/Halbertingerode (before 1506) and Kulingerode (before 1468) were abandoned. Bettingerode fell victim to the flames around 1600.

After World War II, the population of the town increased dramatically owing to Flight and expulsion of Germans from 1944 to 1950, peaking at almost 1000 inhabitants around 1950. As a consequence, the shortern part of Bettingerode ("Silesian Ring") was constructed in order to provide more living space. Bettingerode was incorporated into Bad Harzburg on July 1, 1972, along with the communities Bündheim-Schlewecke, Harlingerode, and Westerode.

== Images ==
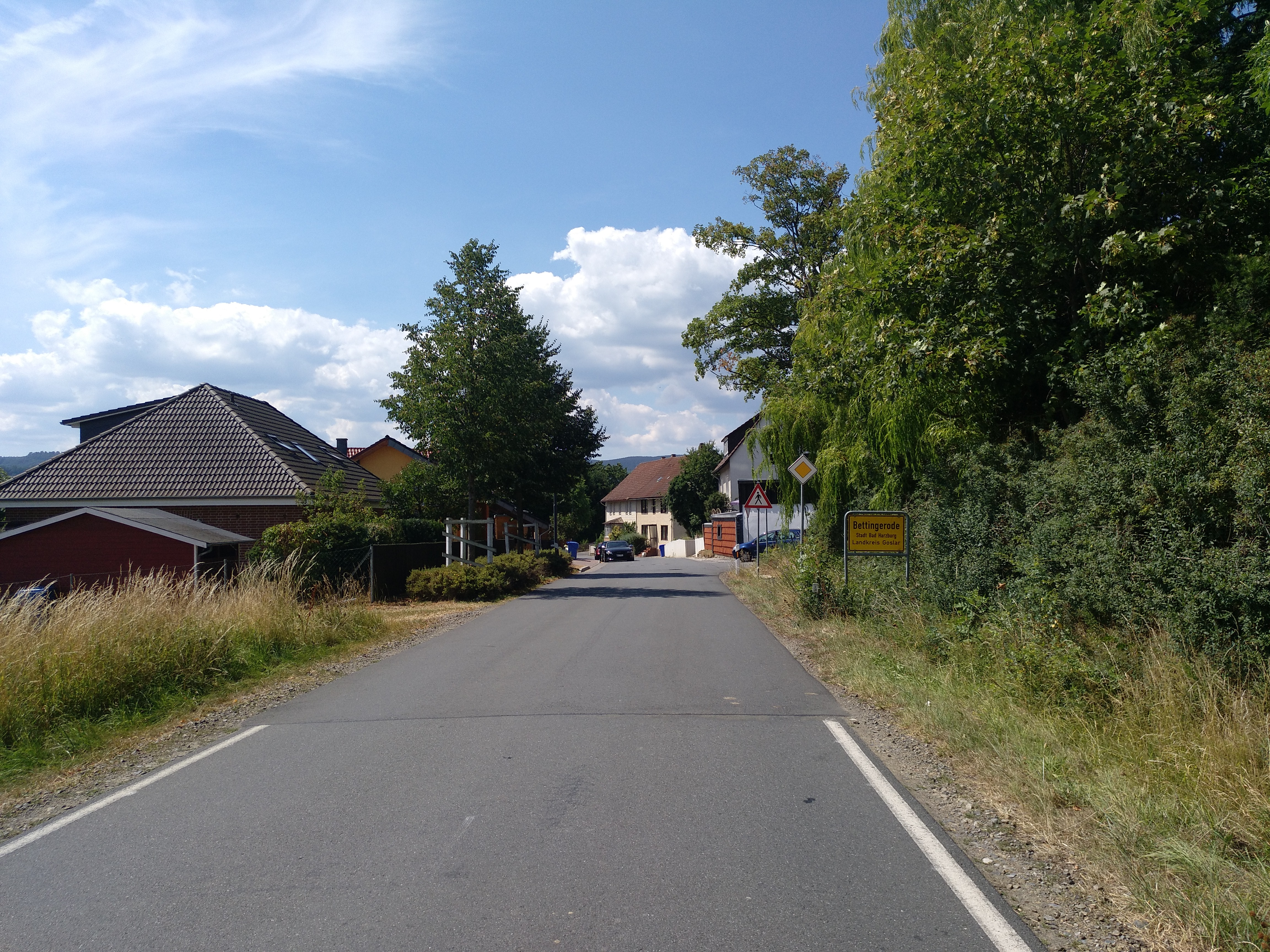
Northern entrance from Lochtum

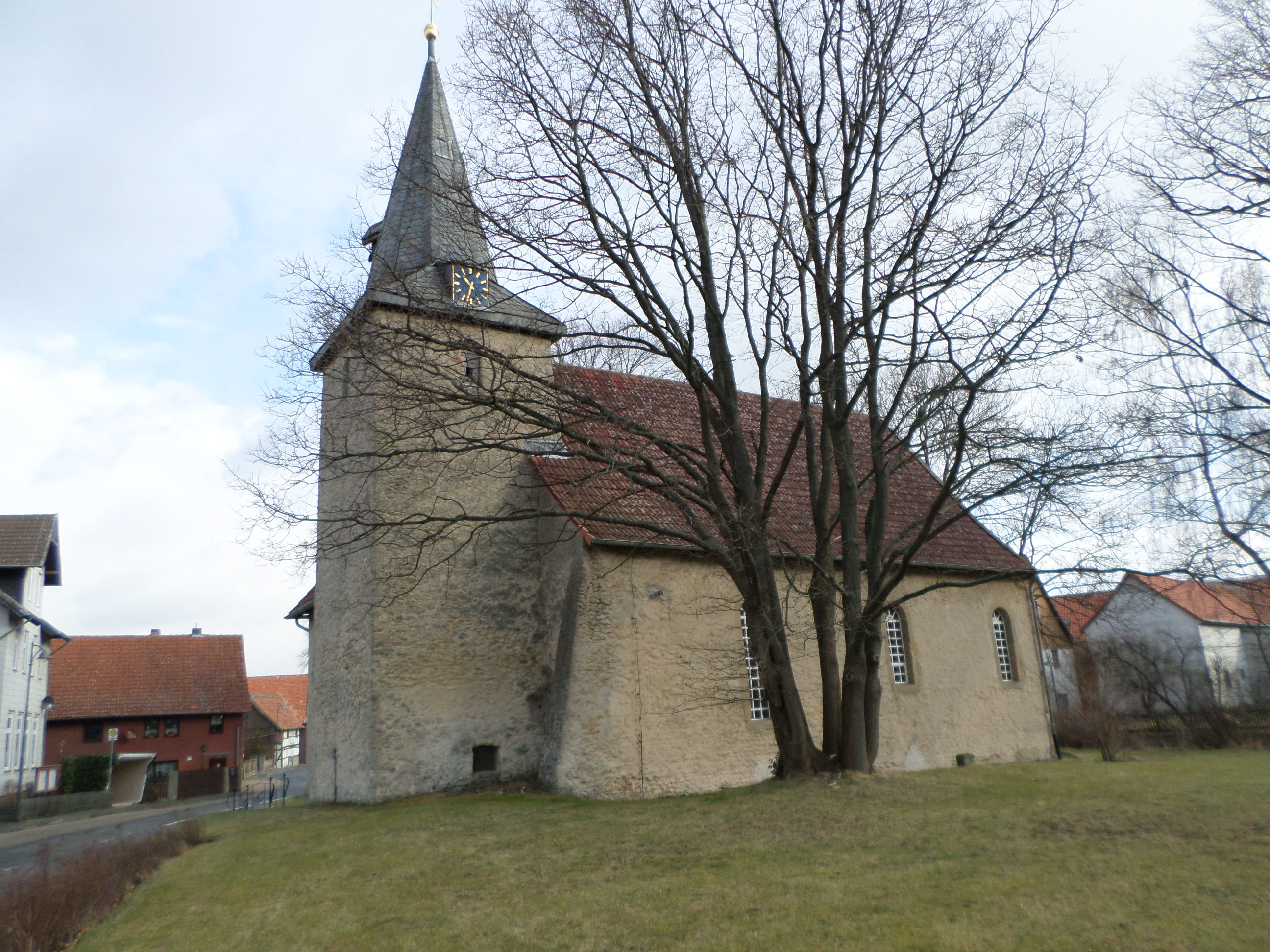
Lutheran church

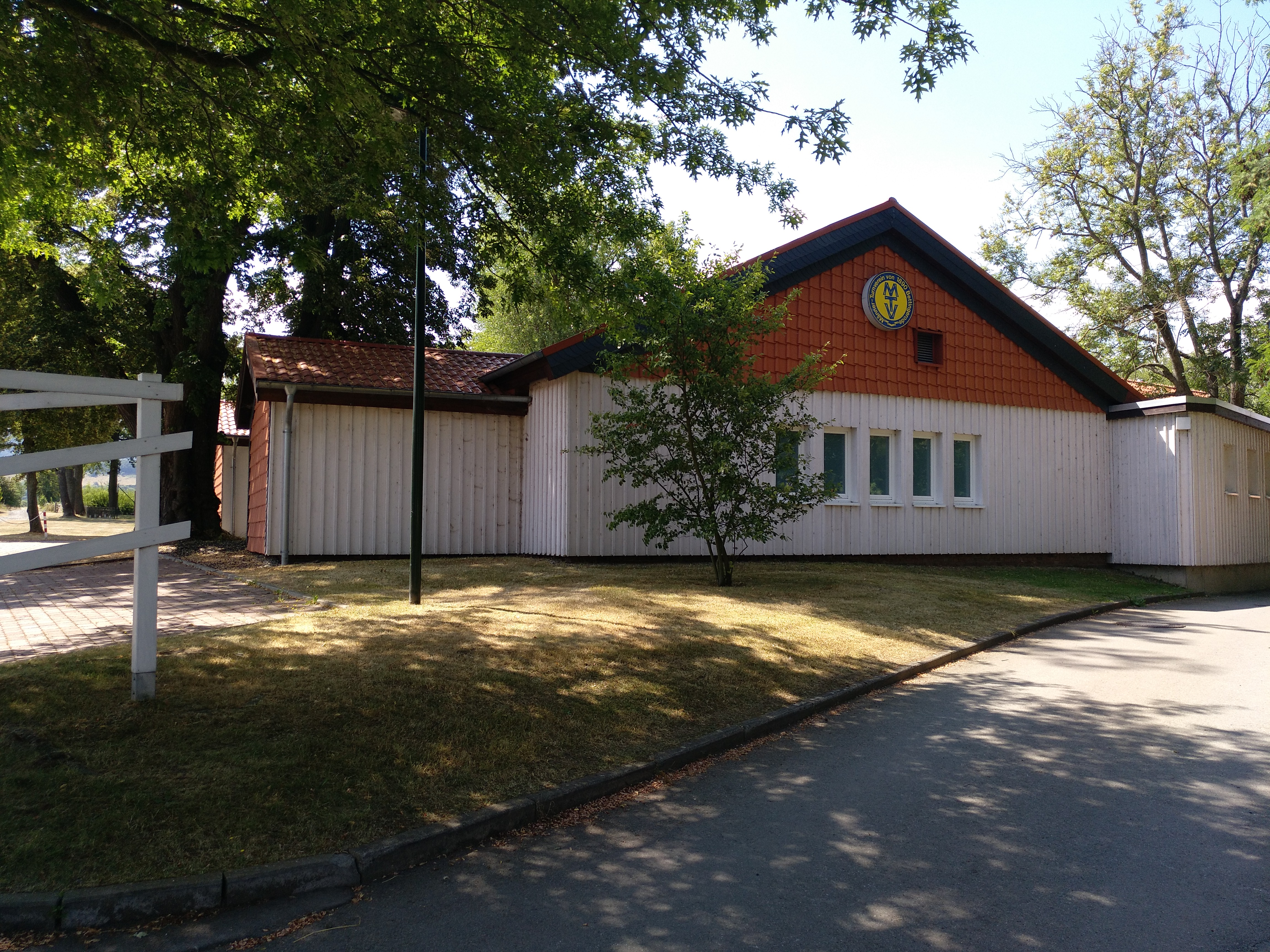
Local sports hall
