= Hansa Pit =

Former iron mine in Germany known for its paleontology

Hansa
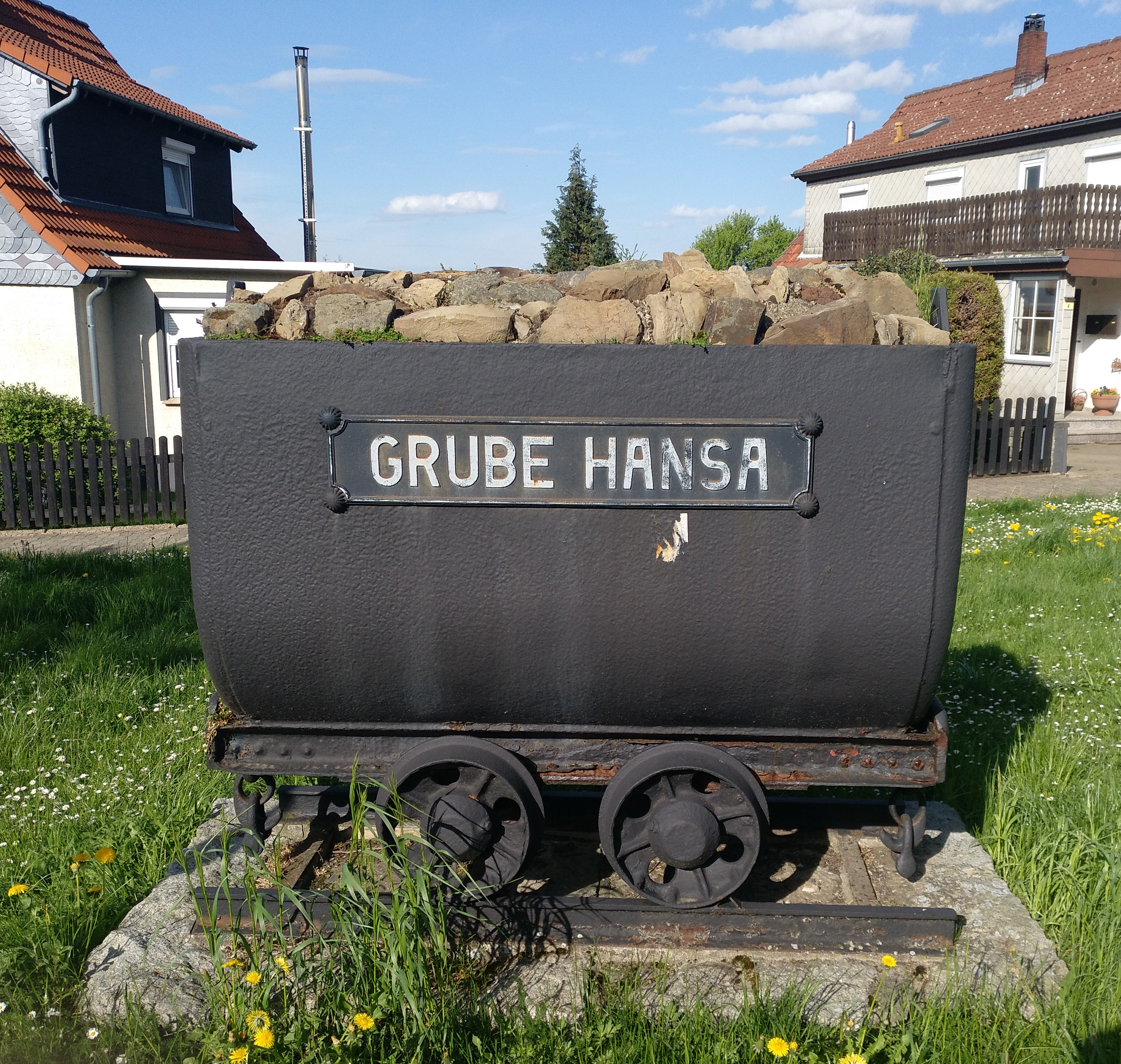
- Minecart in Göttingerode
- Interactive map of Hansa
- Location: Harlingerode, Wolfenbüttel (now Goslar), Lower Saxony, Germany; 51°54′16.5″N 10°30′50.45″E
- Products: iron ore
- Greatest depth: 273 metres (896 ft)
- Opened: June 1865
- Closed: August 1960
- Company: Harz-Lahn-Erzbergbau AG

The Hansa Pit (German: Grube Hansa) was a mine on the territory of Harlingerode in the county of Wolfenbüttel in the Free State of Brunswick and later in Lower Saxony, West Germany. It was founded on the Langenberg south of Harlingerode; however, the only remainders are located on the north side.

== Geology ==
The Langenberg, internationally known for the discovery of Europasaurus and part of the Northern Harz Boundary Fault north of the Harz, consists of Korallenoolith with layers of chalky iron ore, containing up to 25% iron. On the northern part of the Hansa pit, limonite was more predominant and fossils of Orectolobiformes indet. were found.

== History ==
=== 19th century ===
On behalf of consul Herrmann Henrich Meier, local geologist and director for mining administration Wilhelm Castendyck discovered the iron deposits beneath the Langenberg in the mid-19th century.

==== Hermann deposit ====
The earliest deposit, the Hermann deposit, was first mentioned in 1860 and established soon after that. It was located north of the Langenberg, where the remaining area around the opening hole is conserved nowadays. In order to reach the significant pyrolusite conglomerate beneath the Langenberg, a tunnel with a length of 187 metres was drilled. However, due to the strong mountain pressure and brittle rock, the tunnel needed further support and it was decided to extend the tunnel west- and eastwards instead. Due to unprofitability, the Hermann deposit was abandoned in 1867.

==== Hansa deposit ====
The relevant Hansa deposit was first documented in 1862. It was discovered as a characteristic Korallenoolith deposit in the Röseckenbach valley west of Göttingerode and southwest of the Langenberg. From here on, the seam was mined eastwards as far as to the outskirts of Schlewecke around 1.5 kilometres east.

A new area with the official name Hansa Pit was founded on June 3, 1865, west of where Göttingerode was founded later. Due to the very poor condition of roads at the location, the mine was temporarily closed in November 1865 until conditions improved.

=== 20th century ===
The aftermath of the Great Depression caused the mine to be temporarily shut down on March 15, 1932. However, due to the German Nazi Party's plans to gain more autarky with their ressources, the mine was put back into operation on November 1, 1935. In order to provide sufficient living space for the necessary workers, the Göttingerode settlement was erected south of the Langenberg and next to the Hansa pit.

In 1938–39, a connection to the Oker–Bad Harzburg railway was established by erecting a chain conveyor to the Harlingerode station.

The Hansa pit was closed on August 23, 1960, due to lack of profitability.

== Links ==
- Regionalverband Harz: Hansa Mine (English), 2022
