= Bundesautobahn 369 =

Federal motorway in Germany

A 369
- Bundesautobahn 369

Route information
- Length: 4.2 km (2.6 mi)
- Existed: 2019–present

Major junctions
- North end: A 36 in Vienenburg
- South end: B 6 in Bad Harzburg

Location
- Country: Germany
- States: Lower Saxony

Highway system
- Roads in Germany; Autobahns; List; Federal; List; State; E-roads
← A 352	→ A 391

Bundesautobahn 369 (translates from German as Federal Motorway 369, short form Autobahn 369, abbreviated as BAB 369 or A 369) is an autobahn in Germany. It was designated from a part of the B 6 on 1 January 2019.

== History ==
=== Preliminary planning ===
Its plannings began in the early 1950s, when the communities of Oker, Bündheim, and Bad Harzburg struggled with increasing traffic on their two-lane streets B 4 and B 6. A first draft from a planning office in Brunswick in April 1953 proposed the recent pathway from Vienenburg east of the Radau river through the city. A second proposal from Landkreis Wolfenbüttel included a different route over the Langenberg and east of Harlingerode, which however was rejected twice. The actual construction of the street began in 1971, when the southern part of the four-lane street in Bad Harzburg was under construction and finished on 18 December 1971. The A 369 itself was finished in 1972. Even though the anticipated name was A 369, the highway was finally dedicated as A 395 after the old plannings of the A 36 were discarded.

=== A 395 ===
Between 1982 and 1987, the four-lane Bundesstraße 6 was constructed between Goslar and the A 395, leading to the Bad Harzburg intersection being added to the highway.

After German Peaceful Revolution and reunification of Germany around 1990, the eastern part of the Bundesstraße 6 was constructed from Vienenburg to Bernburg (Saale) between 1997 and 2011. After the Vienenburg intersection was finished in 2001, the A 395 between this junction and the Bad Harzburg intersection was downgraded to a Bundesstraße in order to maintain a consistent numbering, now being a simple dual carriageway.

=== Upgrade to A 369 ===
In the context of the anticipated upgrade of the eastern part of the Bundesstraße 6 to Bundesautobahn 36 since 2017, the major of Bad Harzburg (Ralf Abrahms) as well as the Lower Saxon Minister for Environment, Energy, Building, and Climate Protection Olaf Lies requested the upgrade of the downgraded part of the A 395 as well, now under the old numbering of A 369. This demand was accepted and officially announced by the Federal Ministry of Transport and Digital Infrastructure on 10 January 2018 and performed on 1 January 2019.

Historical planning in 1976

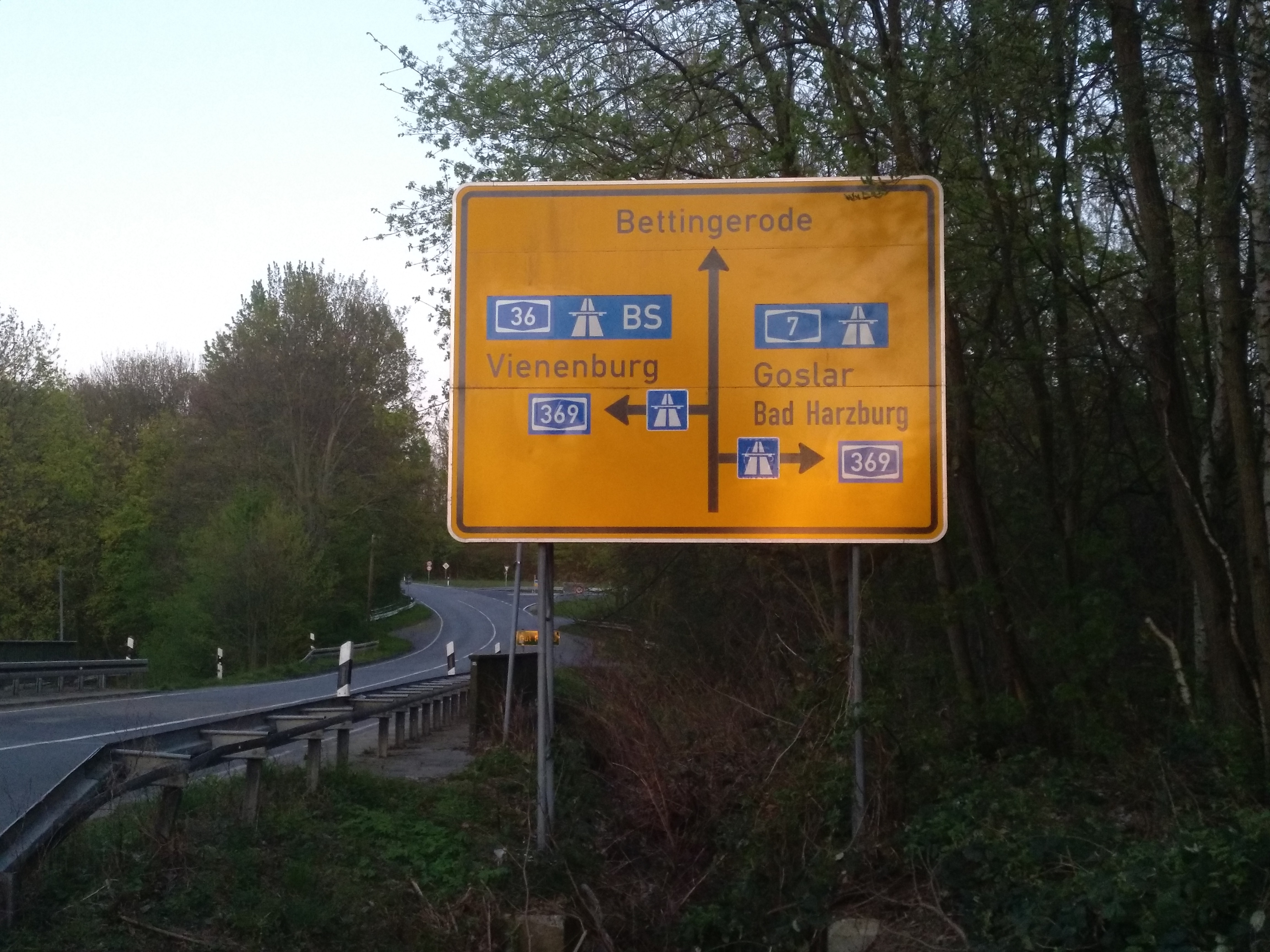
A 369 and A 36 stickers on a former Bundesstraße sign, April 2019

== Exit list ==
(1)	Vienenburg 3-way interchange A 36
(2)	Vienenburg-Süd
(3)	Harlingerode
(4)	Bad Harzburg 3-way interchange B 6

== Gallery ==
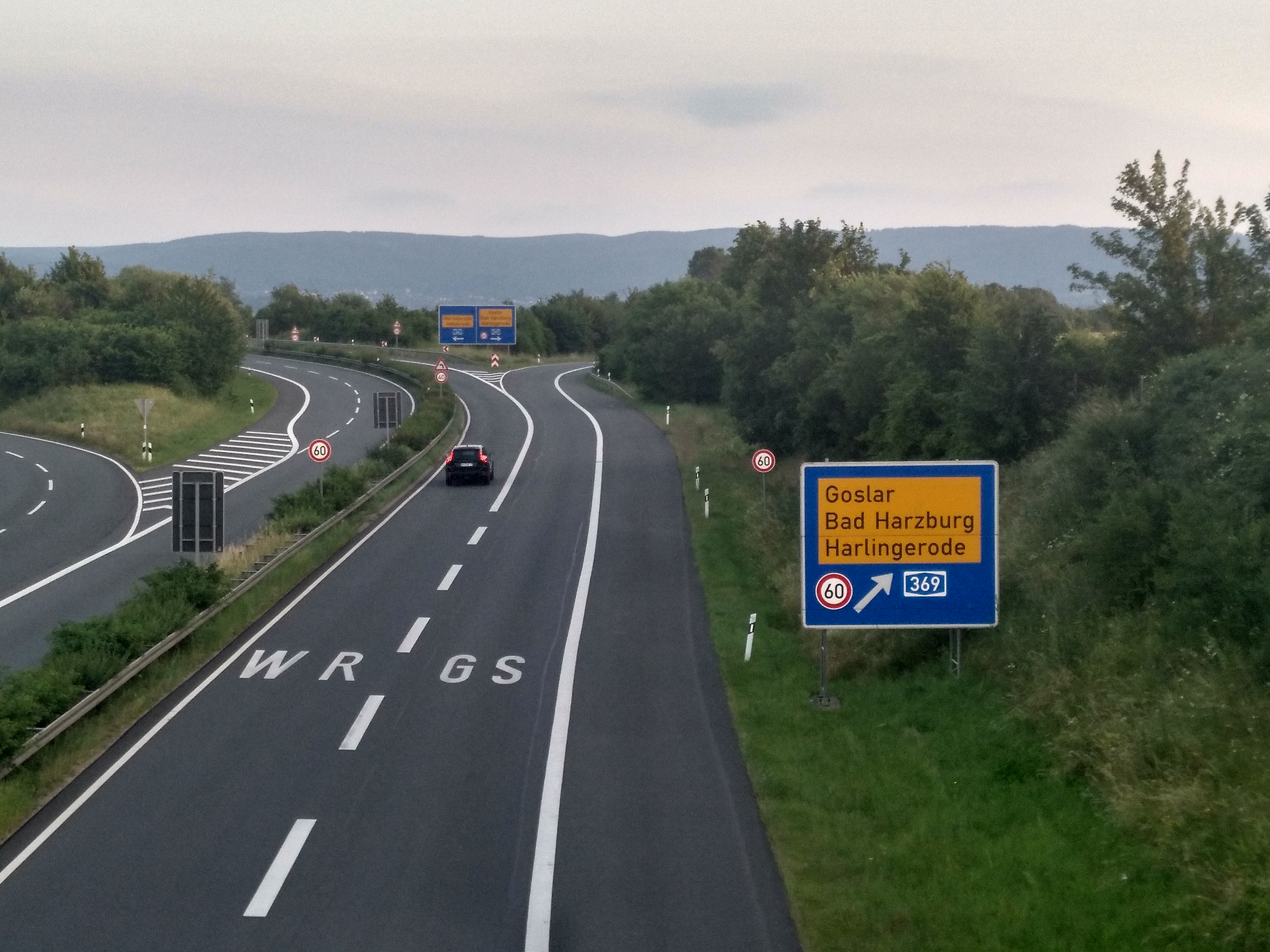
Beginning

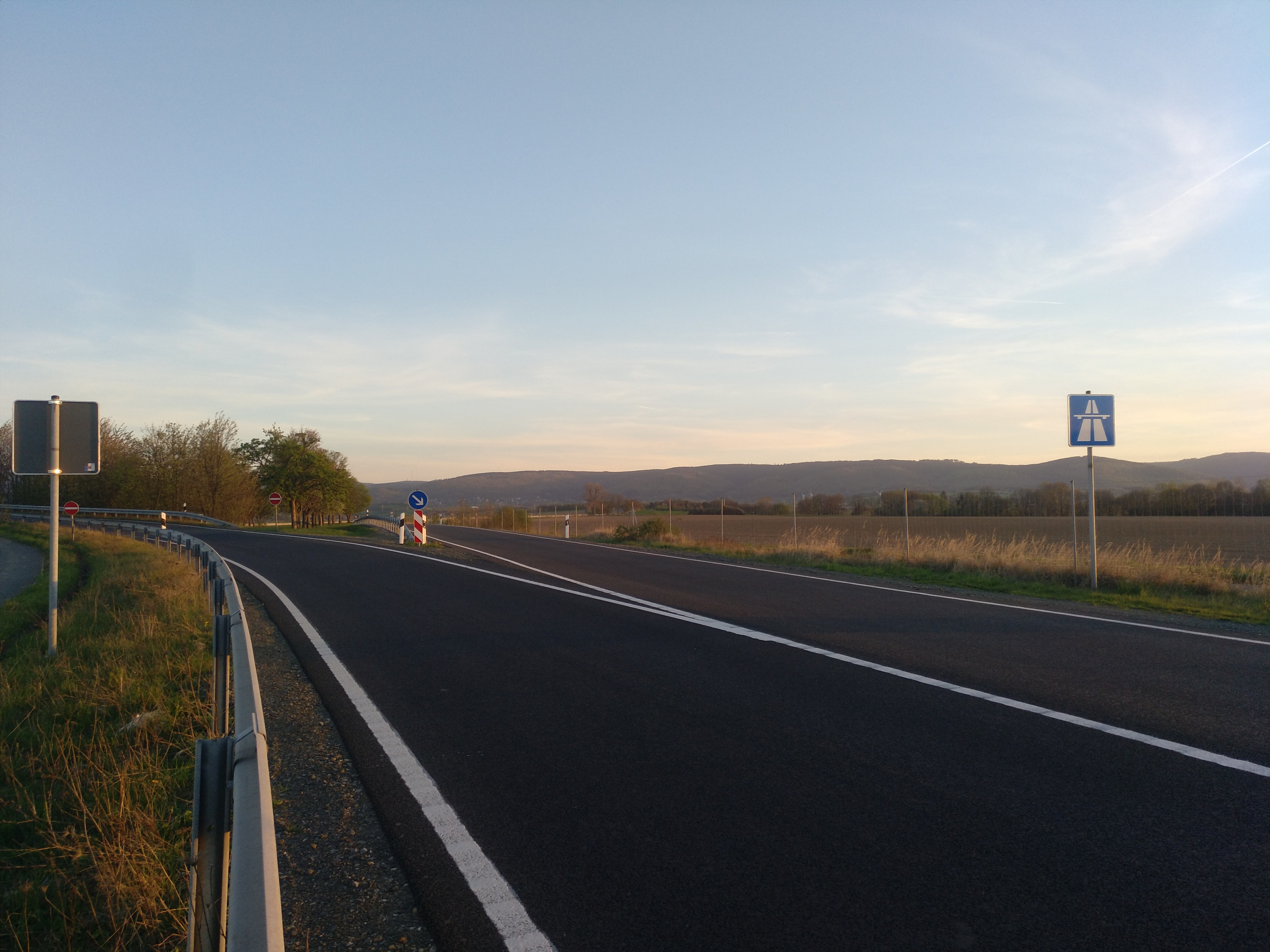
Vienenburg exit

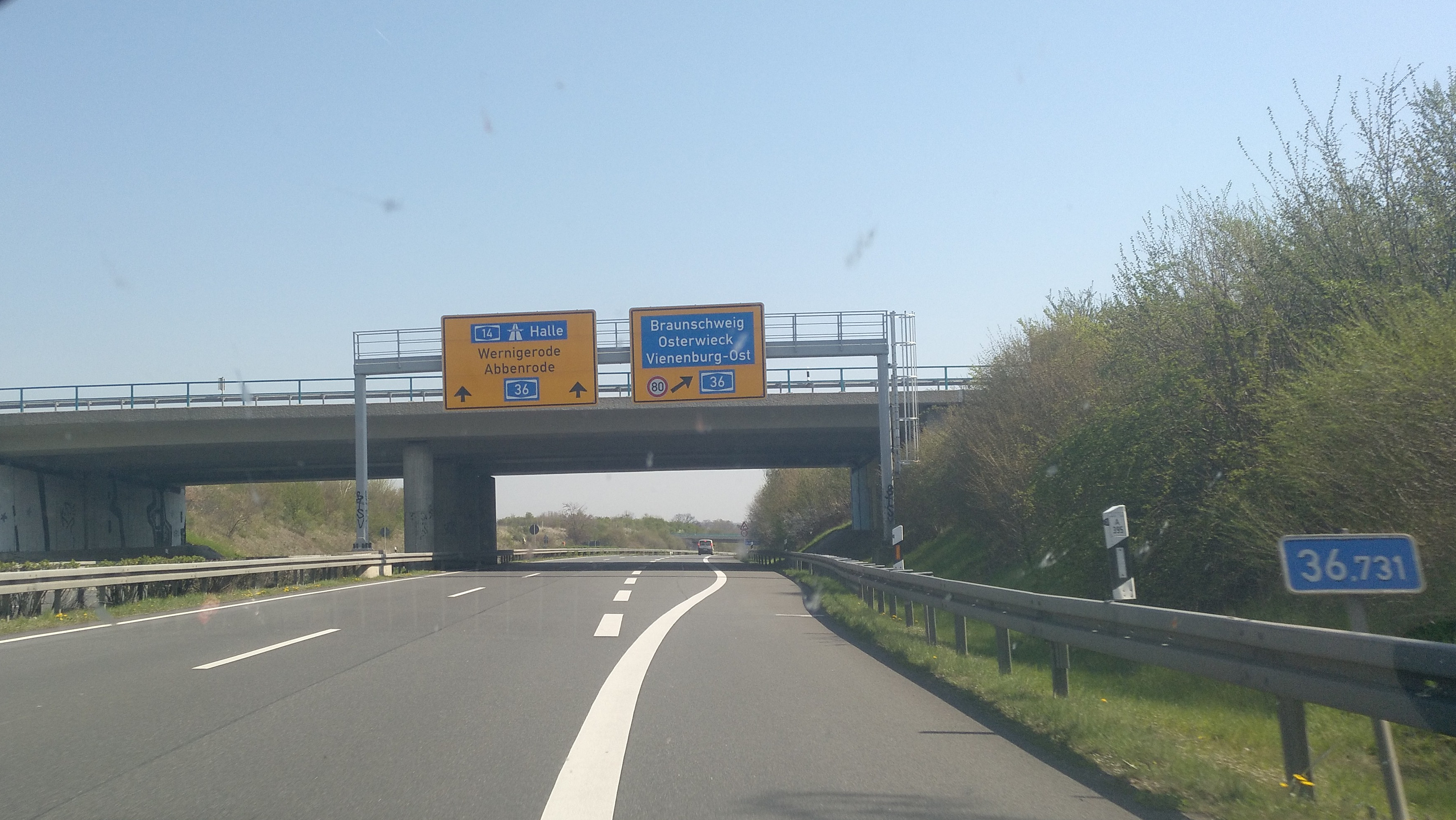
A 36 transition
