= Langenberg (Bad Harzburg) =

Mountain in the Harz, Germany

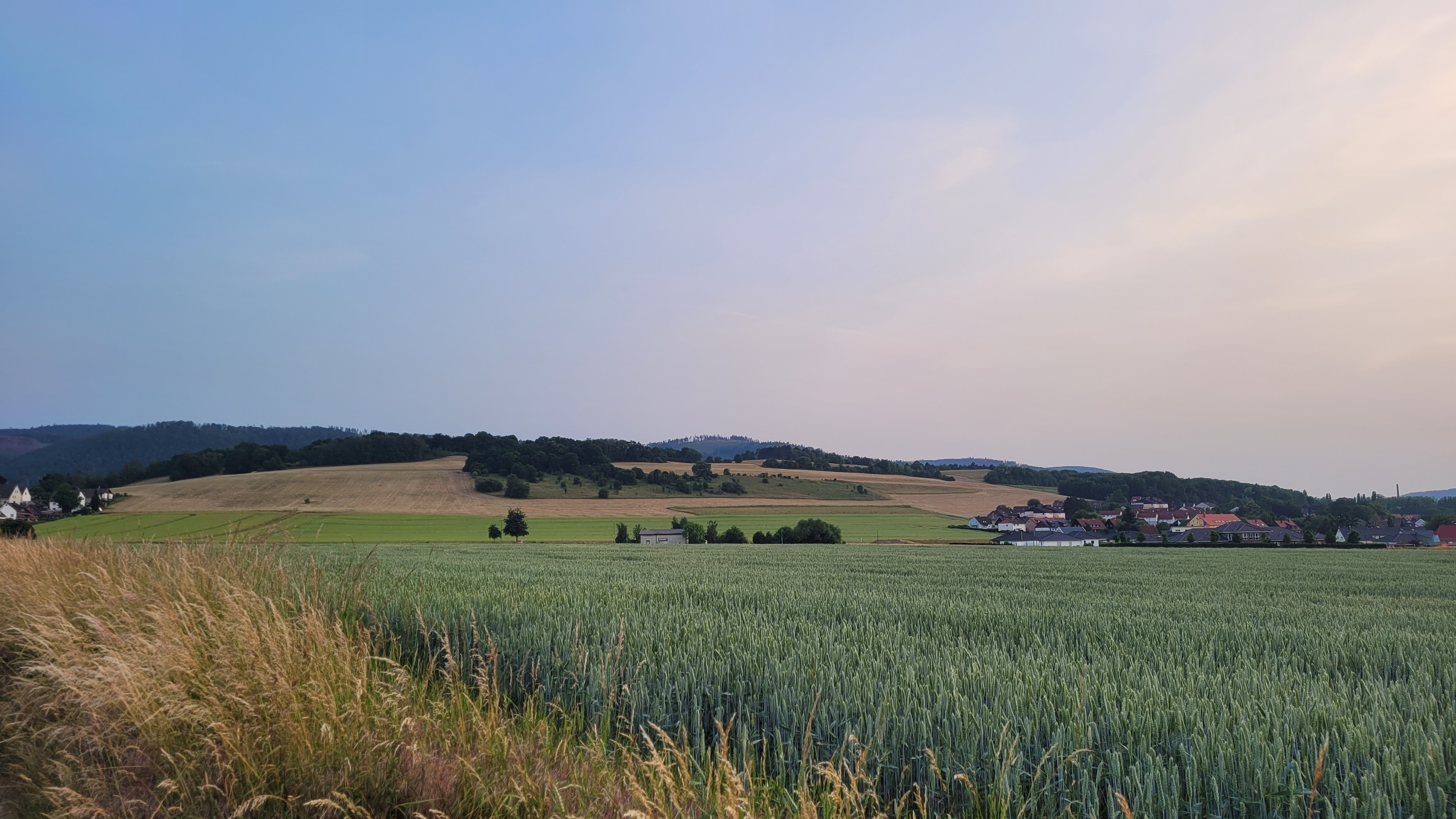
- View from north, 2022 (Schlewecke to the left, Harlingerode to the right)

Highest point
- Elevation: 304 m above sea level (NN) (997 ft)
- Coordinates: 51°53′14″N 10°34′21″E

Geography
- Location within Lower Saxony
- Location: Lower Saxony, Germany
- Parent range: Harz foothills

The Langenberg (German pronunciation: [ˈlaŋənbɛʁk]) is an elongated chalk hill north of Göttingerode and south of Harlingerode in the spa town of Bad Harzburg in Goslar district, in the German state of Lower Saxony. Due to its obvious display of the Northern Harz Boundary Fault in the Langenberg chalk quarry and the discovery of the Europasaurus in 1998 in said quarry, this mountain has gained national geological relevance.

== Geology ==
The Langenberg chalk quarry exposes a nearly continuous, 203 m (666 ft) thick succession of carbonate rocks belonging to the Süntel Formation, that ranges in age from the early Oxfordian to late Kimmeridgian stages and have been deposited in a shallow sea with a water depth of less than 30 m (98 ft). The layers exposed in the quarry are oriented nearly vertically and slightly overturned, which is a result of the ascent of the adjacent Harz mountains during the Lower Cretaceous. Widely known as a classical exposure among geologists, the quarry had been extensively studied, and visited by students of geology for decades.

== History ==
Its name simply means "long mountain" in German and was first mentioned between 1285 and 1296 as "silva Langenberg" and 1309 as "der Langenberch" as a part of the Goslar Cathedral chapter.

During the middle ages up to the early 19th century, the Langenberg was completely cleared from any forests. The Langenberg originally belonged to the villages of Schlewecke, Harlingerode, and Göttingerode. However, since Göttingerode was given up in the 15th century, a dispute between Schlewecke and Harlingerode arose over the former community land, eventually being successful for Harlingerode.

Chalk quarries can be dated back at least as early as the mid-18th century, where maps are showing little mining grounds on the eastern- and westernmost end of the hill. Additionally, the works of local geologist Wilhelm Castendyck between 1859 and 1861 revealed oolithic iron deposits, leading to the foundation of the Hansa Pit on the mountain's northern cliff in 1861. The mine stayed operational until August 23, 1960.

=== Chalk mining ===
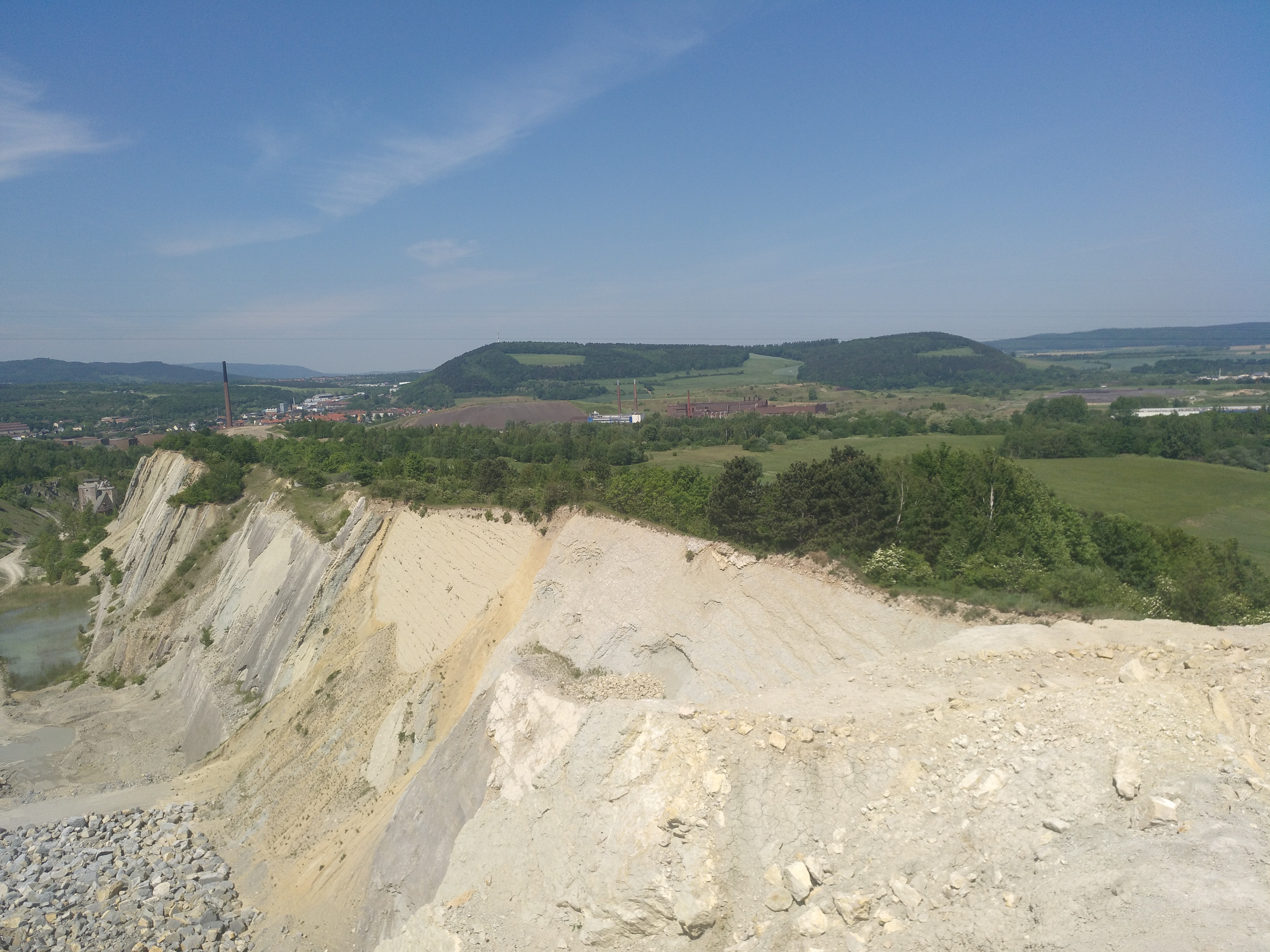
Former Langenberg chalk quarry ripping up the mountain in half, 2018

Industrial and large-scale chalk mining was introduced in 1871 by entrepreneur Adolph Willikens on the Kalkröse at the westernmost tip of the mountain ridge. However, the production did not reach a significantly geologically noticeable amount until the time after the Second World War, where the quarry was significantly extended eastwards. Lime (material) and fertilizers were produced now and shipped by rail on the Oker–Bad Harzburg railway.

By the 1980s the quarry had reached a length of more than one kilometre and a width of over 100 metres. It extended from the westernmost end of the Langenberg to the local street Göttingeröder Straße, connecting Harlingerode and Göttingerode across the mountain. The mining company originally planned to extend its mine beyond this street, which would have eaten up most of the mountain irreversibly. However, the Goslar district denied these plans on July 7, 1976, leading to a lawsuit that first ended in a win for the mining company on June 29, 1982, where the Braunschweig administrative court confirmed the operator of the mine in its right to expansion. In order to hinder these plans, the Goslar district put the eastern half of the Langenberg as Östlicher Langenberg under environmental protection (Naturschutzgebiet) on May 23, 1984. The final defeat for the mining company came as the Supreme Administrative Court of Lower Saxony in Lüneburg decided that mining the eastern half of the Langenberg is illegal. In consequence, the operator closed the quarry in December 1985.

=== Europasaurus discovery ===
In 1998, a single sauropod tooth was discovered by private fossil collector Holger Lüdtke in the now deactivated quarry. The sauropod tooth was the first specimen of a sauropod dinosaur from the Jurassic of northern Germany.

== Recreation ==
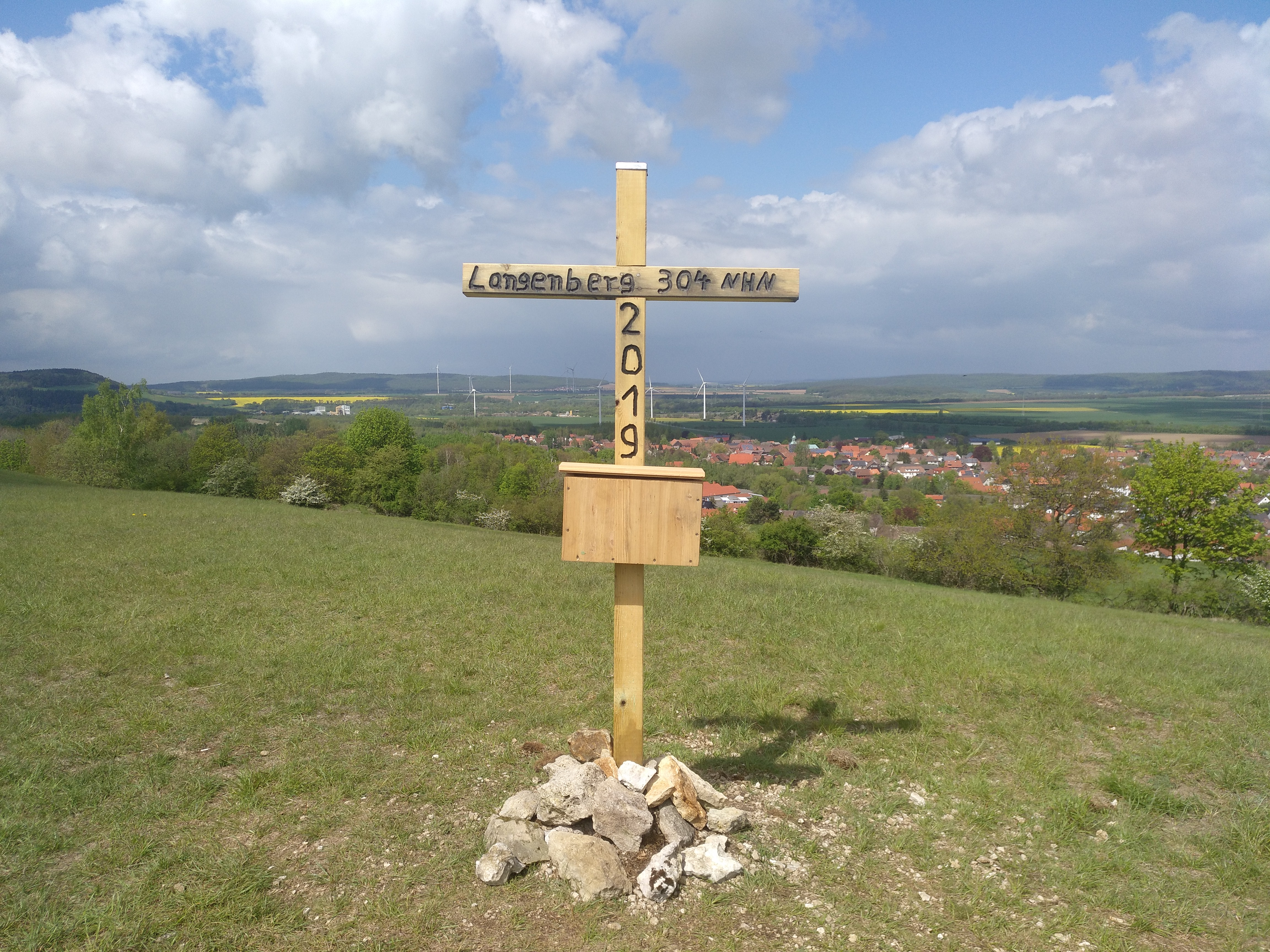
Langenberg cross from 2019

Nowadays, the Langenberg is a popular recreation center, offering many narrow hiking trails and a broad view onto both Harlingerode and the plains, villages, and hills to the north, and the Harz mountains along with the Brocken and Göttingerode to the south.

Although the quarry is still privately owned and access to the public banned due to the lethal risks of its rims stretching several tens of meters into the depth without any protection, this place is visited illegally by motocross riders.

== See also ==
- List of mountains and hills in Lower Saxony
- List of mountains in the Harz
