= Harlingerode =

- Ortsteil of Bad Harzburg
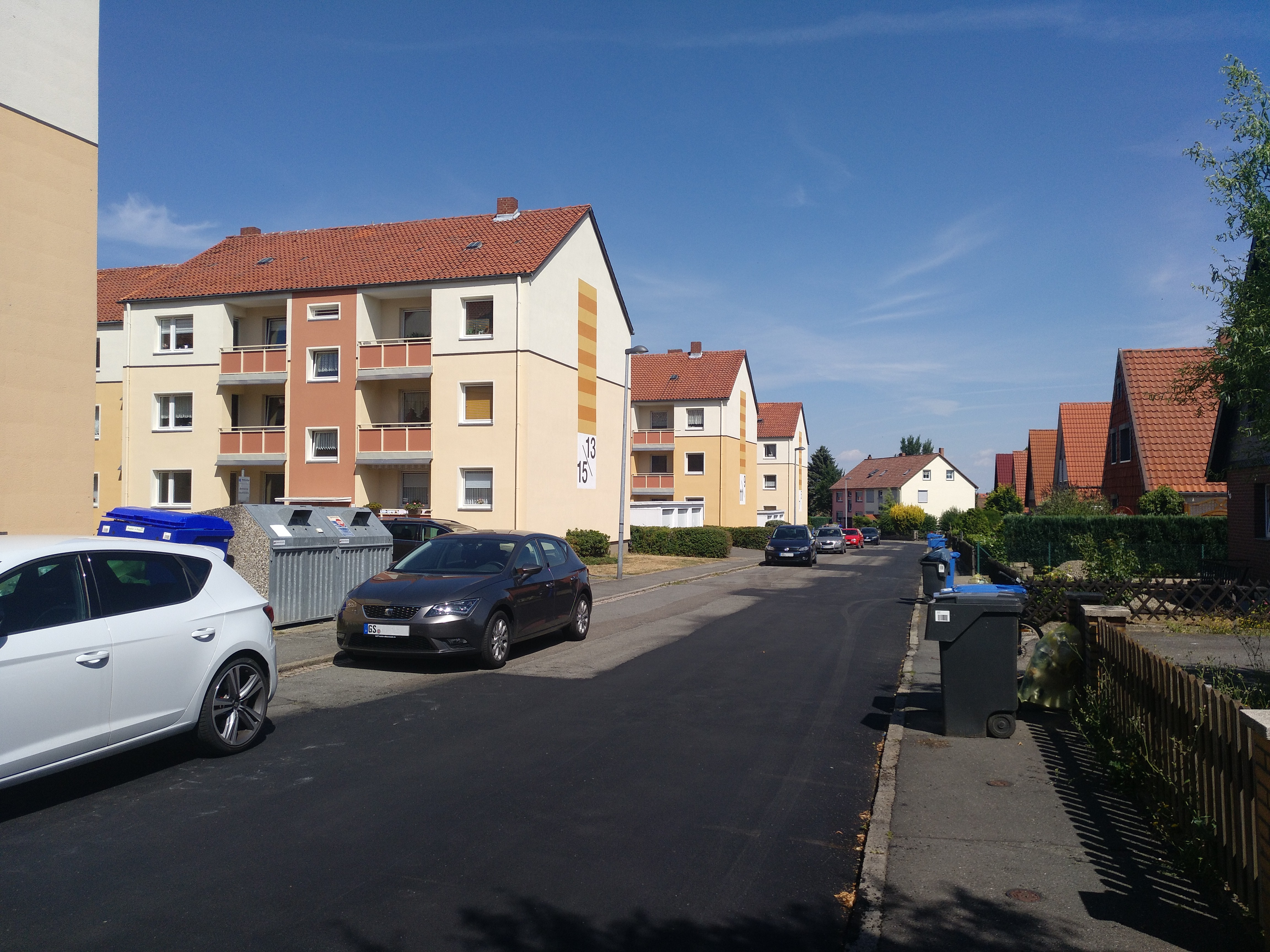
- Downtown apartments from the 1960s, 2018
- Interactive map of Harlingerode
- Location within Germany Location within Lower Saxony
- Coordinates: 51°54′33″N 10°31′13″E
- Country: Germany
- State: Lower Saxony
- District: Goslar
- Town: Bad Harzburg

Area
  - Total: 11.36 km^{2} (4.39 sq mi)

Population (2020-12-31)
  - Total: 2,916
  - Density: 256.7/km^{2} (664.8/sq mi)
- Time zone: UTC+01:00 (CET)
  - Summer (DST): UTC+02:00 (CEST)
- Postal codes: 38667
- Dialling codes: 05322
- Vehicle registration: GS

Harlingerode (German pronunciation: [ˈhaʁlɪŋəˌʁoːdə]) is a village in Germany and district of Bad Harzburg in the district of Goslar in Lower Saxony. As of 2020, Harlingerode had a population of 2,916.

== Geography ==
Harlingerode lies between 190 and 250 m above sea level (NHN), increasing in height in southern direction. The Langenberg in the south is the most dominant landmark with its height of up to 304 m. The town is impenetrated by the Hurle, a tributary of the Oker.

== History ==
Historical populations
Year	Pop.	±%
1663	312	—
1798	667	+113.8%
1885	1,396	+109.3%
1905	1,993	+42.8%
1933	2,519	+26.4%
1972	4,389	+74.2%
1990	3,638	−17.1%
1999	3,529	−3.0%
2005	3,327	−5.7%
2010	3,065	−7.9%
2015	3,043	−0.7%
2018	3,068	+0.8%
2020	2,916	−5.0%
1806, 1964, in general before 1981, since 2011.

=== Etymology ===
The stem Harl- is derived from a settlor Herilo, which is ultimately rooted in a Proto-Germanic stem *harjaz meaning "army", still visible in German "Heer" and obsolete English "here". -ingerode is a locally widespread ending around the northern Harz region that served as a generic suffix for town names derived by any personal names (compare Göttingerode, Bettingerode).

=== Timeline ===
Harlingerode was founded between the 9th and 10th century by the Saxon House of Billung. Harlingerode was first mentioned as Gut Heregeltingerode (Estate of Heregeltingerode) on June 3, 1053 in a deed of donatio by Henry III and as Herlingerode in 1181.

In June 1865, the Hansa Pit was opened south of the village on the outskirts of the Langenberg. It was under operation until August 1960, with a short shutdown between 1932 and 1935.

The village gained further importance during the 1930s when activities of mining industry were drastically increasing. The Harlingerode Zinc works was built in 1934, which made up the technologically most modern zinc mill in Germany up to the 70's. The demand of housing space owing to the immigration of mineworkers caused to rebuild the abandoned village Göttingerode south of the main town in the same year.

As an aftermath of World War II, the Harlingerode dramatically grew in population due to Flight and expulsion of Germans from 1944 to 1950, peaking at a population of 6,257 in 1950 including Göttingerode. Several construction projects were initiated to create living space from the 1950s to 1970s. Harlingerode was incorporated into the city of Bad Harzburg on July 1, 1972.

During the 1980s, the Bundesautobahn 36 was supposed to be constructed north of Harlingerode, which was later realised as the autobahn-like Bundesstraße 6. Thus, a land consolidation was executed between 1977 and 1983. The local rail station was taken out of service in 1983.

After a drastic decrease of profitability due to falling metal prices, said zinc mill dropped its main processing in 1970 and further secondary activities in 2000. Several succeeding companies of recycling and zinc oxide industry have settled down since the 1990s.

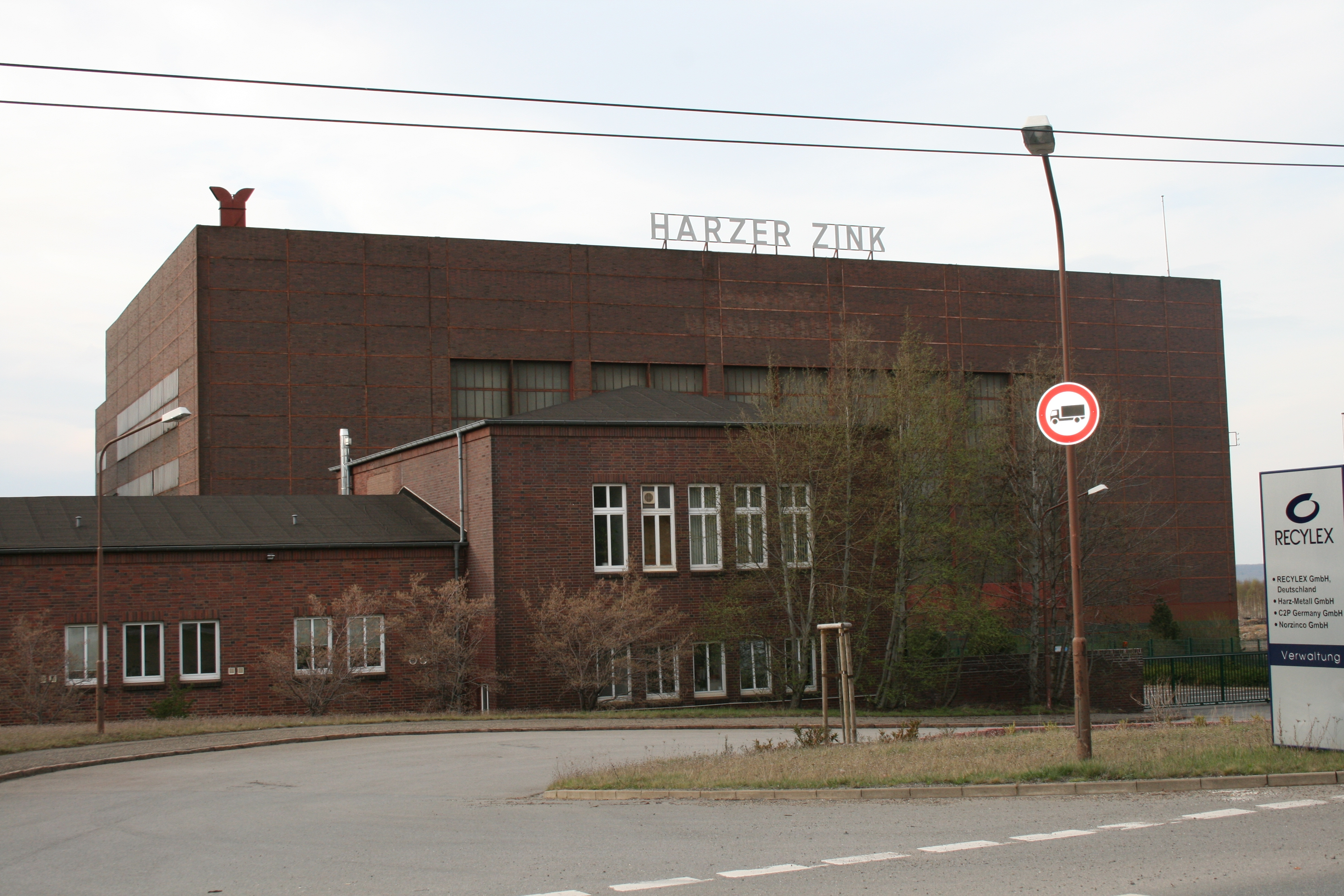
Partial building of the Harlingerode Zinc works, 2009

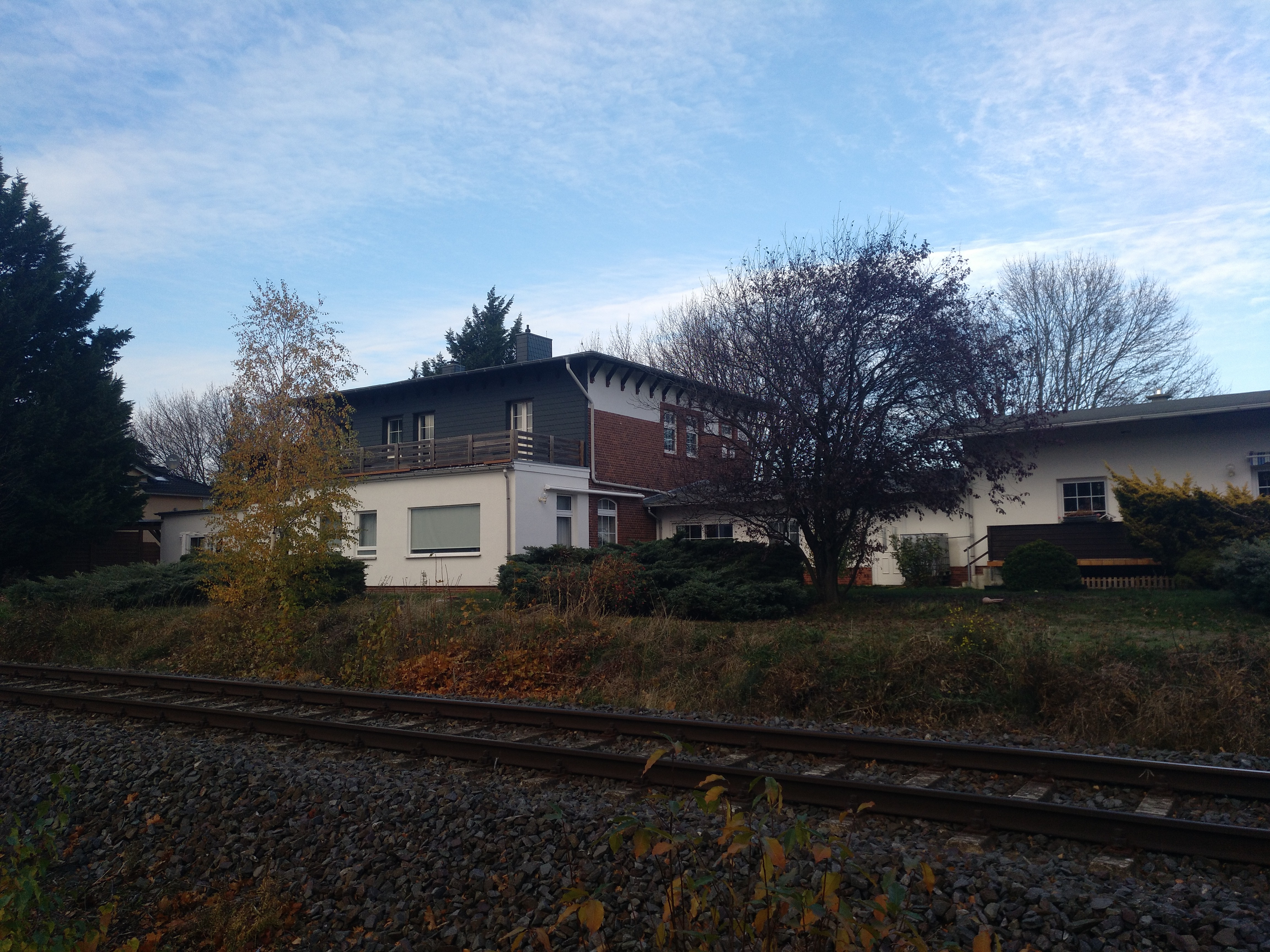
Former Harlingerode rail station, 2018

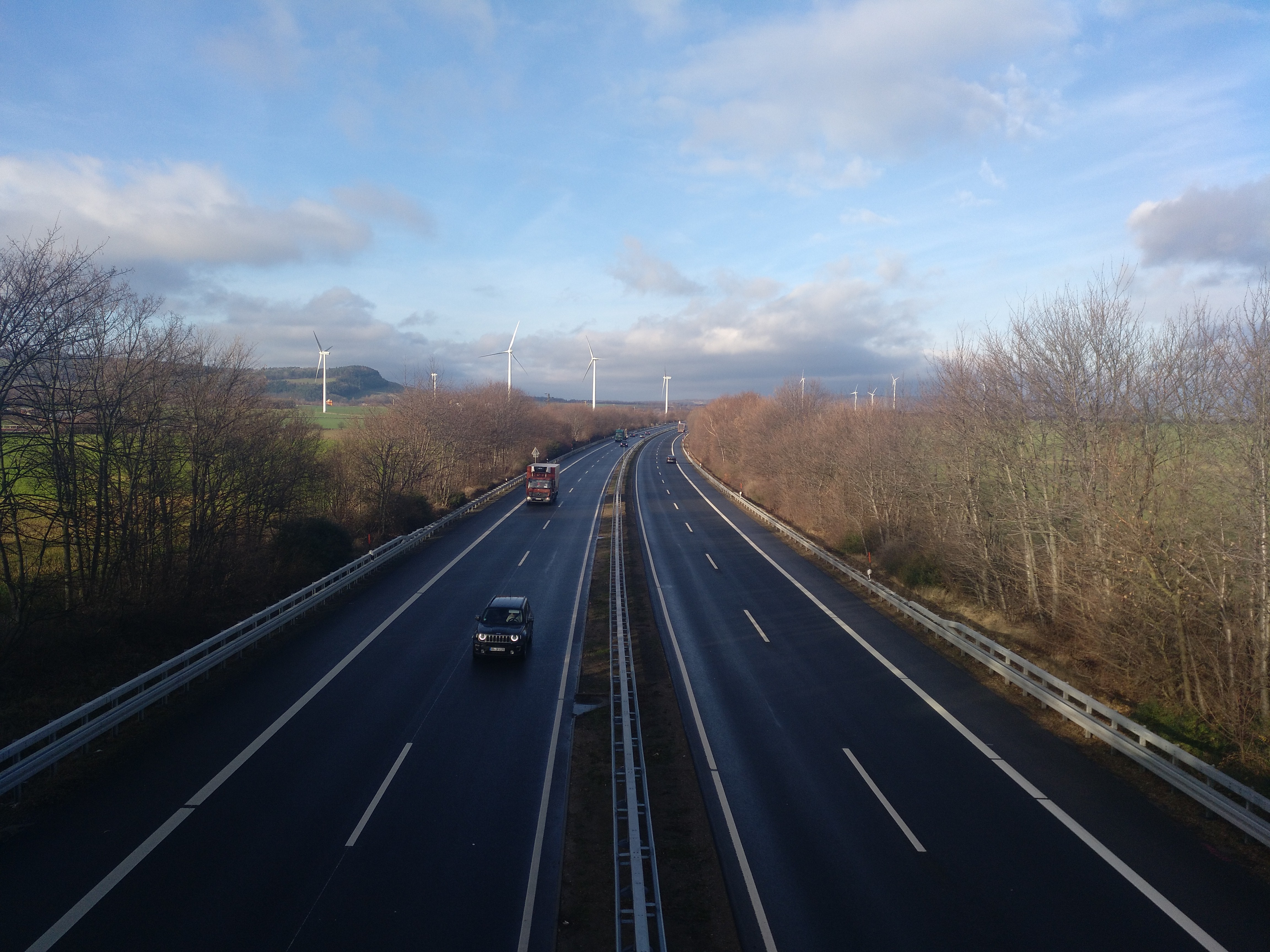
Bundesstraße 6 north of Harlingerode.

== Infrastructure ==
Harlingerode is located south of the highway-like built Bundesstraße 6 and the Bundesautobahn 369. Highway exits are Goslar-Oker to the west and Harlingerode to the east. Furthermore, Harlingerode is penetrated by the Oker–Bad Harzburg railway. Rural roads connect Harlingerode to Oker, Immenrode, Bettingerode, and Schlewecke.

== Gallery ==
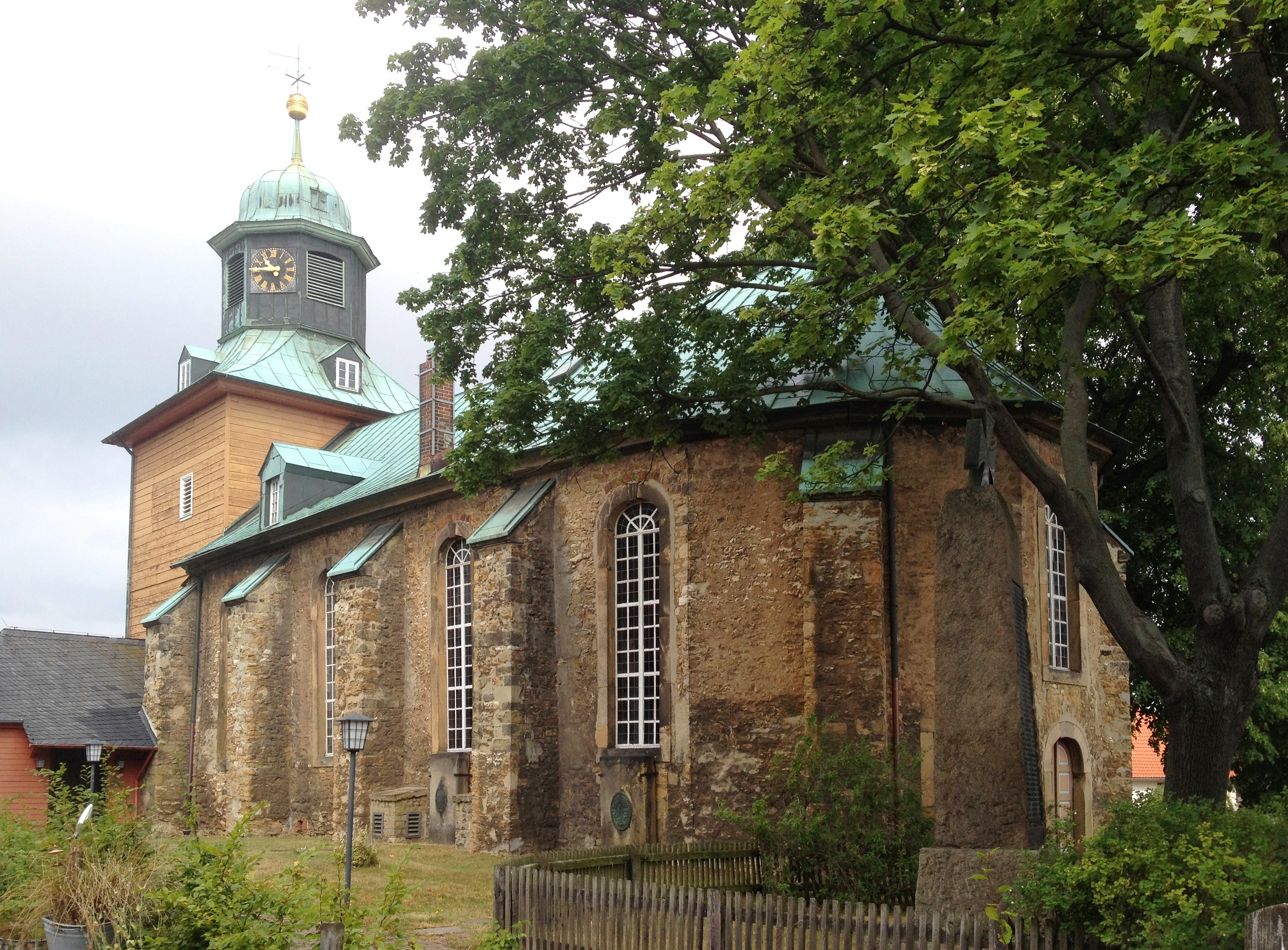
St. Mary's church

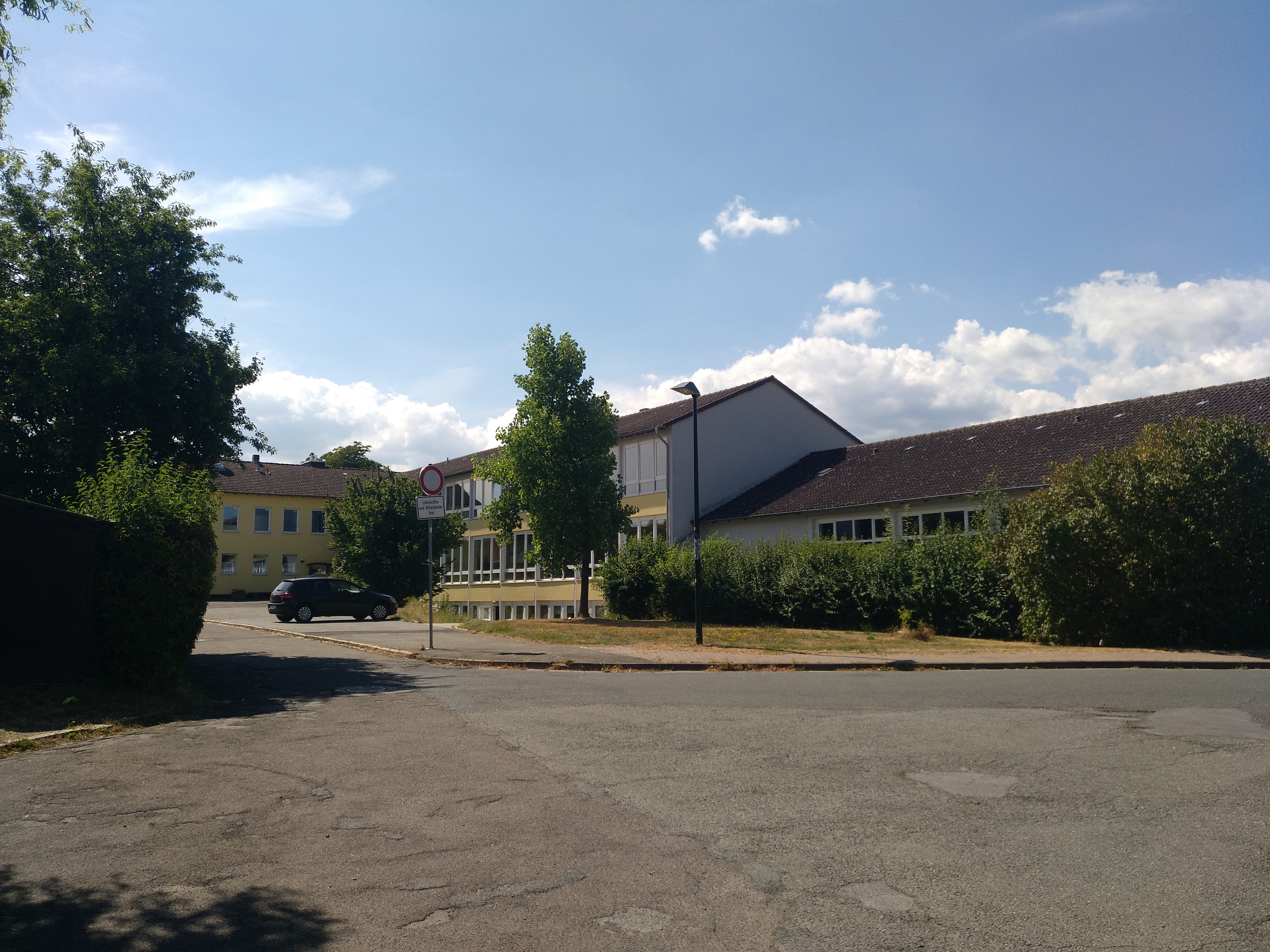
Elementary school

== Literature ==
- Alfred Breustedt: 950 Jahre Harlingerode. 1053–2003. (Village chronicle) Harlingerode 2003, OCLC 249318716.
