= Bundesautobahn 352 =

Federal motorway in Germany

A 352
- Bundesautobahn 352

Route information
- Length: 18 km (11 mi)

Major junctions
- North end: near Mellendorf
- South end: Hanover

Location
- Country: Germany
- States: Lower Saxony

Highway system
- Roads in Germany; Autobahns; List; Federal; List; State; E-roads
← A 293	→ A 369

Bundesautobahn 352 (translates from German as Federal Motorway 352, short form Autobahn 352, abbreviated as BAB 352 or A 352) is an autobahn spur north of Hanover in northwestern Germany. It is an important bypass for traffic from the A 7 to the A 2, avoiding the Hannover-Ost ("East") interchange between the two autobahns. Hannover Airport is also situated near the A 352, which is why locals occasionally refer to it as the Flughafenautobahn ("airport autobahn").

== Exit list ==
(1)	Hannover-Nord 3-way interchange A 7
	Bissendorf parking area
(2)	Langenhagen-Kaltenweide
(3)	Hannover-Flughafen (northern part)
(3)	Hannover-Flughafen (southern part) B 522
(4)	Engelbostel
(5)	Hannover-West 3-way interchange A 2
