= Northern Harz Boundary Fault =

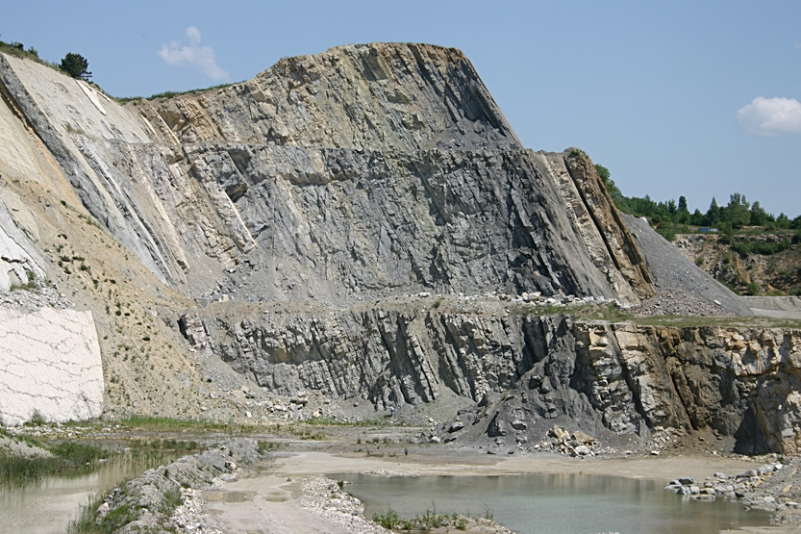
Steeply inclined strata, overturned towards the south, of the Jurassic in the Langenberg quarry near Göttingerode

The Northern Harz Boundary Fault (German: Harznordrandstörung or Harznordrandverwerfung) is a geological fault where the Harz Block, which consists of rocks formed during the Palaeozoic Era and folded in the course of Hercynian mountain building, borders on the Subhercynian Basin or Harz Foreland. The fault is also known in English as the Harz North Rim Fault or Harznordrand Thrust (Fault).

The northern edge of the Harz is oriented in a Hercynian (WNW-ESE) direction and runs from Neuekrug-Hahausen via Langelsheim, Goslar, Bad Harzburg, Ilsenburg, Wernigerode, Blankenburg, Thale and Gernrode to the area of Ballenstedt.

The Northern Harz Boundary Fault forms the southern border of the Northeast German Basin, a part of the Central European Basin. The Subhercynian Basin, also known as the Harz Foreland, is a small sub-basin of the Northeast German Basin. This intracontinental basin that has been subsided since the Permian period was formed from the Hercynian foreland basins and accumulated sediments of the Mesozoic era. The basin was formed by a deformation or bulging of the Moho. In the Cretaceous the basin was squeezed by Alpine orogeny which also uplifted the Harz Block.

The Northern Harz Boundary Fault was activated in the Early Cretaceous and the Harz was uplifted along the line of the fault. The Harz Block was thrust over the Mesozoic strata of the Subhercynian Basin, steeply tilting its Mesozoic strata. The most intensive phase of uplift occurred in a period of about 2 million years from the middle of the Santonian age to the lower Campanian. The completion of uplift is shown by the fact that the rocks of the Upper Cretaceous lie at a much shallower angle than those of the Lower Cretaceous, and that, in some places, they overlap discordantly. The uplift is still going on today.

Along the western part of the fault, the Harz was lifted by at least 5 to 7 km, which can be estimated from the thickness of the Mesozoic rocks deposited in the Harz Foreland and eroded Paleozoic rocks. The Harz was partly thrust over the layers of Mesozoic rock to the north. Here, the Mesozoic strata were tilted steeply (70-80 degrees) or even overturned. A good example is at the Langenberg Quarry, but there are also many other outcrops that show the steeply sloping strata. In these strata, rocks of the Jurassic are steeply inclined. Near Blankenburg and Ballenstedt there are rocks lying at steep angles from the Cretaceous, which form the so-called Devil's Wall or Teufelsmauer. They include, inter alia, rocks of Heidelberg Sandstone, a silicified quartz sandstone.

Springs rise along the entire fault system, both those with low quantities of minerals as well as mineral water springs. The mineral waters are used, for example, in Bad Harzburg, by the spa industry.

== See also ==
- Geology of Germany

== Sources ==
- Mohr K. (1998), "Harz- Westlicher Teil", in M. Gwinner (ed.), Sammlung Geologischer Führer (in German), vol. 58, Berlin-Stuttgart: Borntraeger, ISBN 3-443-15071-3
- König W. (2008), Dissertation an der Martin-Luther-Universität Halle-Wittenberg (ed.), Zeitliche und genetische Einordnung von tertiären Sedimentvorkommen im Mittelharz und im Harzvorland: Ein Beitrag zur Reliefentwicklung und zur Karstmorphogenese im Harz (in German), p. 151
