= Göttingerode =

Göttingerode Jettchenrue (Low German)
- Ortsteil of Bad Harzburg
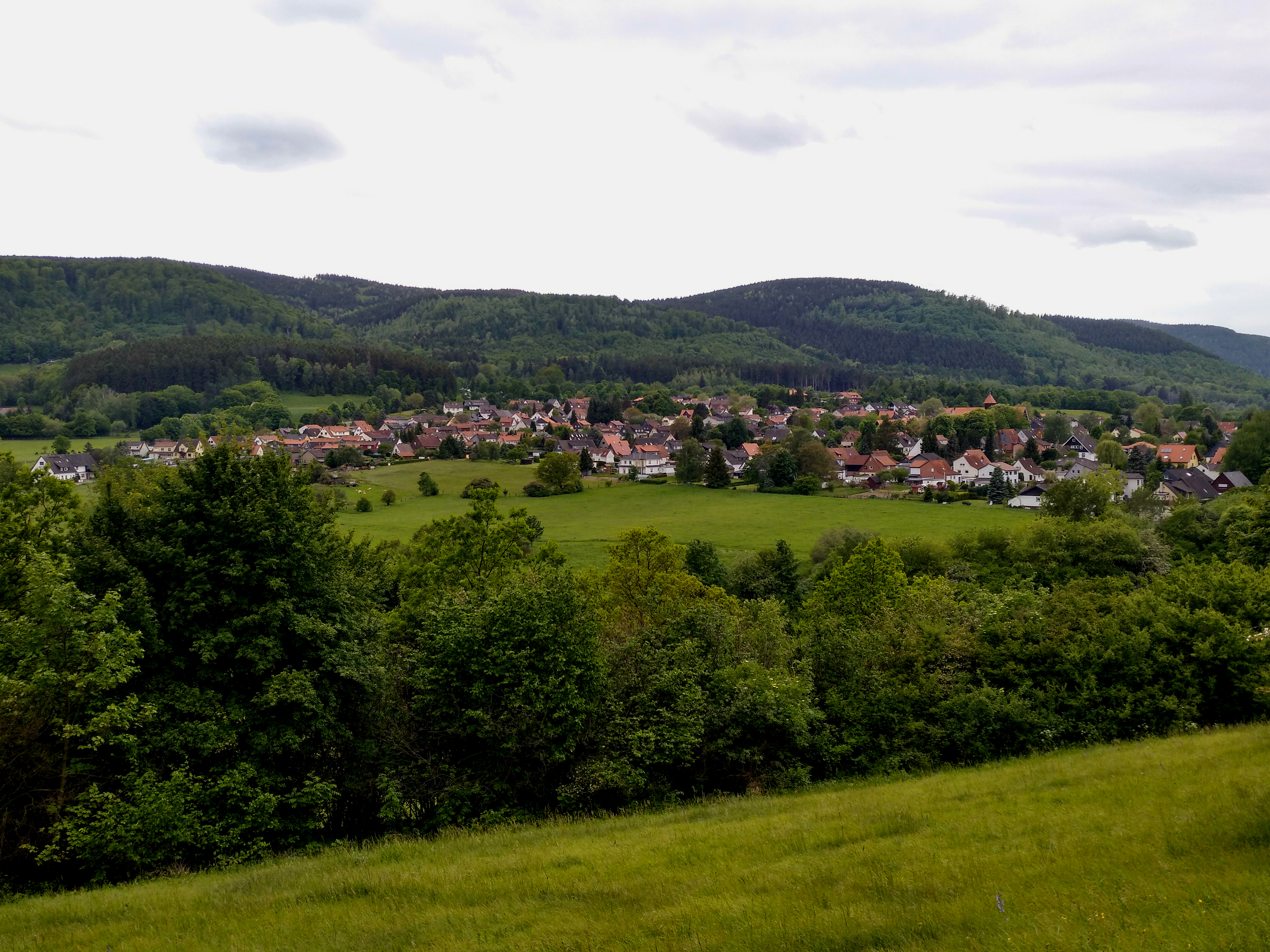
- Göttingerode from the ridge of the Langenberg, 2017
- Interactive map of Göttingerode
- Location within Germany Location within Lower Saxony
- Coordinates: 51°53′36″N 10°31′13″E
- Country: Germany
- State: Lower Saxony
- District: Goslar
- Town: Bad Harzburg

Area
  - Total: 1.35 km^{2} (0.52 sq mi)

Population (2020-12-31)
  - Total: 902
  - Density: 668/km^{2} (1,730/sq mi)
- Time zone: UTC+01:00 (CET)
  - Summer (DST): UTC+02:00 (CEST)
- Postal codes: 38667
- Dialling codes: 05322
- Vehicle registration: GS

Göttingerode (German: [ˈɡœtɪŋəˌʁoːdə]; Oker dialect: Jettchenrue [ˈjɛtçn̩ˌruːə]) is a village in Germany and district of Bad Harzburg in the district of Goslar in Lower Saxony. As of 2020, Göttingerode had a population of 902. It gained international relevance owing to the discovery of the Europasaurus in the Langenberg chalk quarry in 1999.

== Geography ==
Göttingerode is positioned north of the Harz mountains (in particular, the Goldberg and Adenberg) and south of the Langenberg, renowned for being part of the geologically relevant Northern Harz Boundary Fault. The Röseckenbach flows south of Göttingerode. Lush forests surround this town and give it a fairly idyllic touch. The village covers 1.35 km^{2} (0.52 sq mi).

The district is located between Oker (Goslar) to the west, Harlingerode to the north, Schlewecke to the east and Bündheim to the southeast.

== History ==
Historical populations
Year	Pop.	±%
1934	0	—
1976	1,444	—
1997	1,182	−18.1%
2005	1,094	−7.4%
2010	995	−9.0%
2015	978	−1.7%
2018	986	+0.8%
2020	902	−8.5%
1976, 1997, since 2011.

=== Etymology ===
The name Göttingerode means “Clearing of Godo's people” and might stem from a shortening of Gotthard, or a root relating to Proto-Germanic *gudą "God".

=== Early Göttingerode settlement ===
A first settlement mentioned in 1163 as Gotingeroht preceded the recent settlement. It was most certainly abandoned in 14th or 15th century and didn't extend the size of a few houses.

Other mentionings were:

- 1181: Gothincheroth
- 13th century: Gottingerodde
- 1461/1470: Göttingerode
- 1578: Göttingeroda (after abandonment)
- 1607: Gottingerode

The church of this village was torn down in order to provide material for a brick kiln in Oker. A hunting lodge was founded in 1680 on today's Göttingerode's territory.

=== New Göttingerode ===
As Nazi Germany attempted to achieve autarky on the import of ore, the Rammelsberg project was initiated, leading to the foundation of the Harlingerode Zinc works. In order to provide living space for the required staff, the Free State of Brunswick officially allowed the new foundation of a town south of the Langenberg under the name Göttingerode. The village originated on March 21, 1935 as a part of the municipality of Harlingerode.

The village's development was hampered by poor financial situation, air pollution, and instable land owing to the intensive operation of the Hansa Pit until August 23, 1960.

In 1972, Göttingerode was incorporated into the city of Bad Harzburg according to the Harzgesetz.

== Traffic and Infrastructure ==
Göttingerode is tangent to the Landesstraße L 501 (Bundesstraße 6 until 1983) in the south. Furthermore, the Kreisstraße (district road) leads across the Langenberg to Harlingerode in the north.

Two bus lines connect Göttingerode with Goslar and Bad Harzburg city.

== Pictures ==
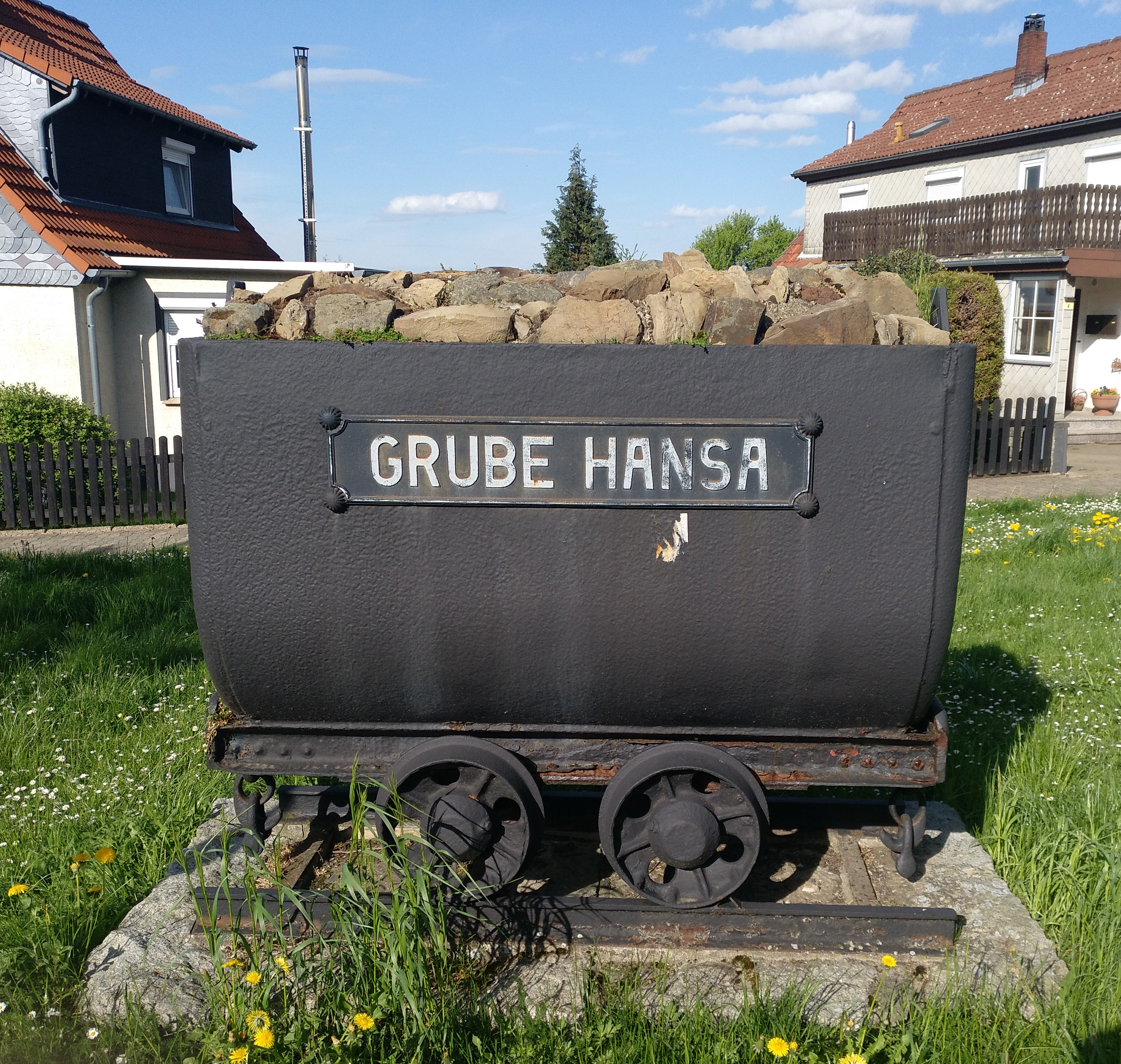
Minecart, formerly used in the Hansa Pit

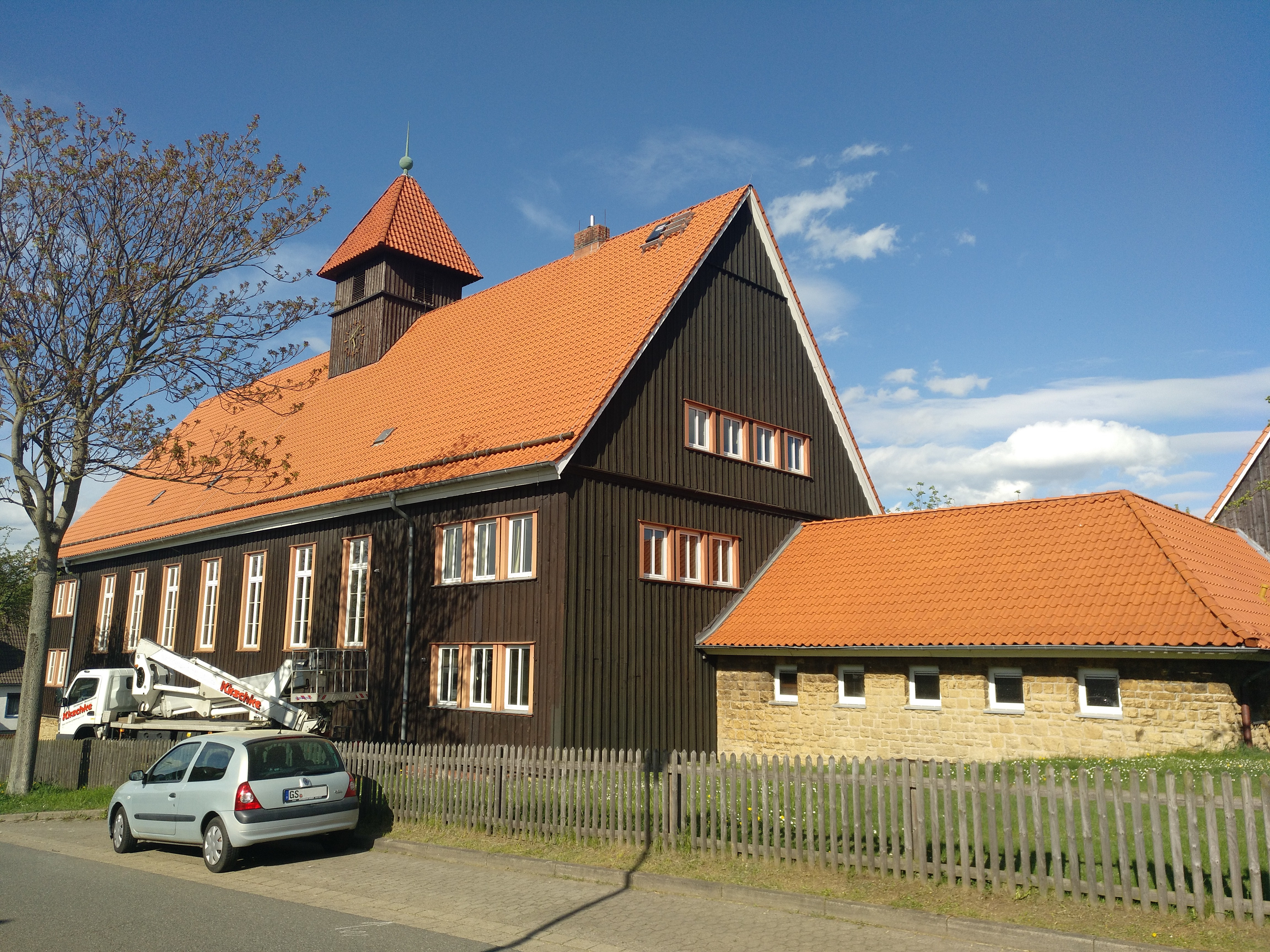
Community center and kindergarten, formerly elementary and middle school

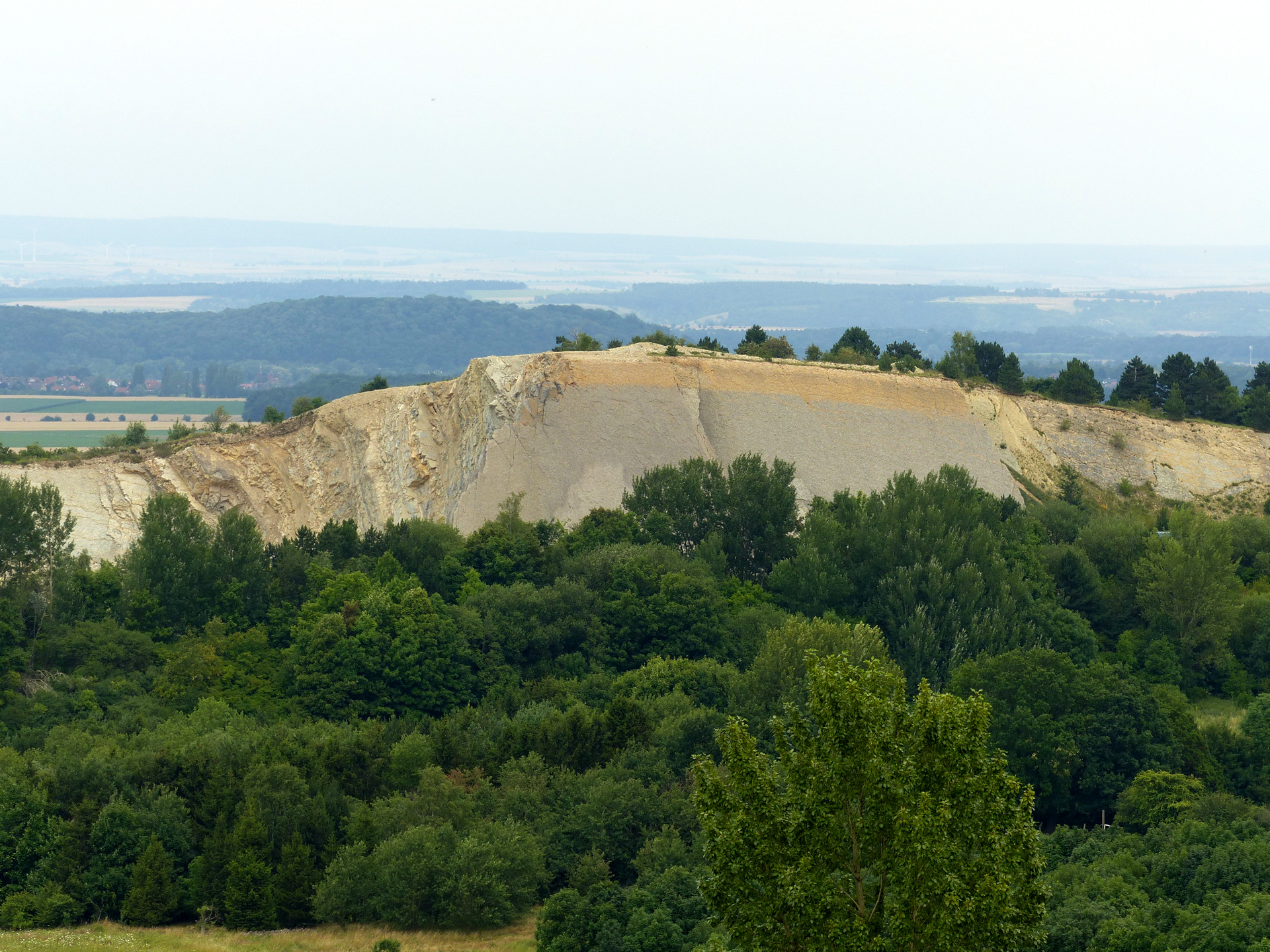
Langenberg chalk quarry

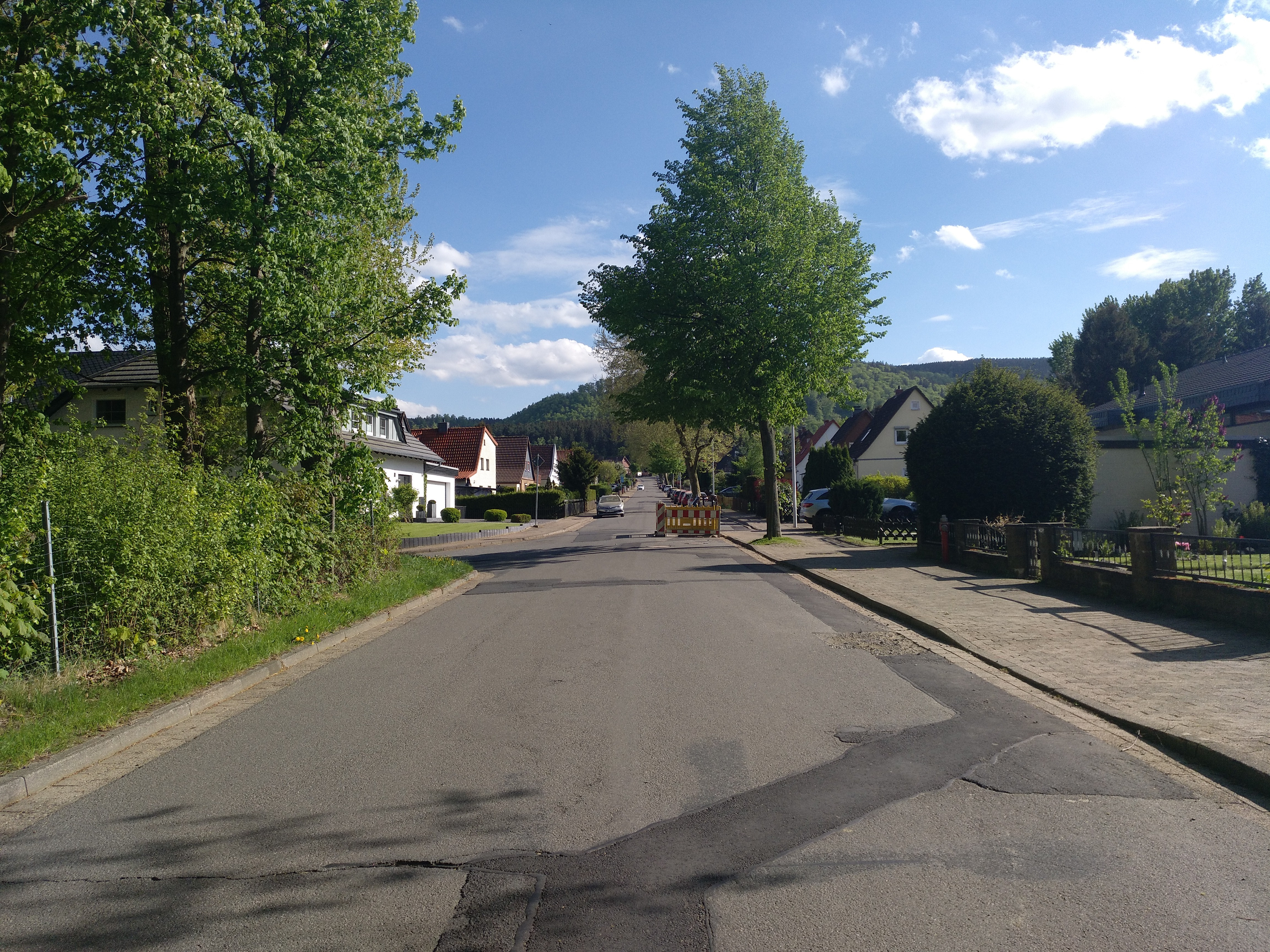
Road in Göttingerode

== Literature ==
- Horst Voigt: 40 Jahre Göttingerode. 1936 bis 1976. Bad Harzburg, September 1976.
- Alfred Breustedt: 950 Jahre Harlingerode. 1053–2003. S. 22. (chronicle) Harlingerode 2003, OCLC 249318716.
