= Oker–Bad Harzburg railway =

Railway line in Germany

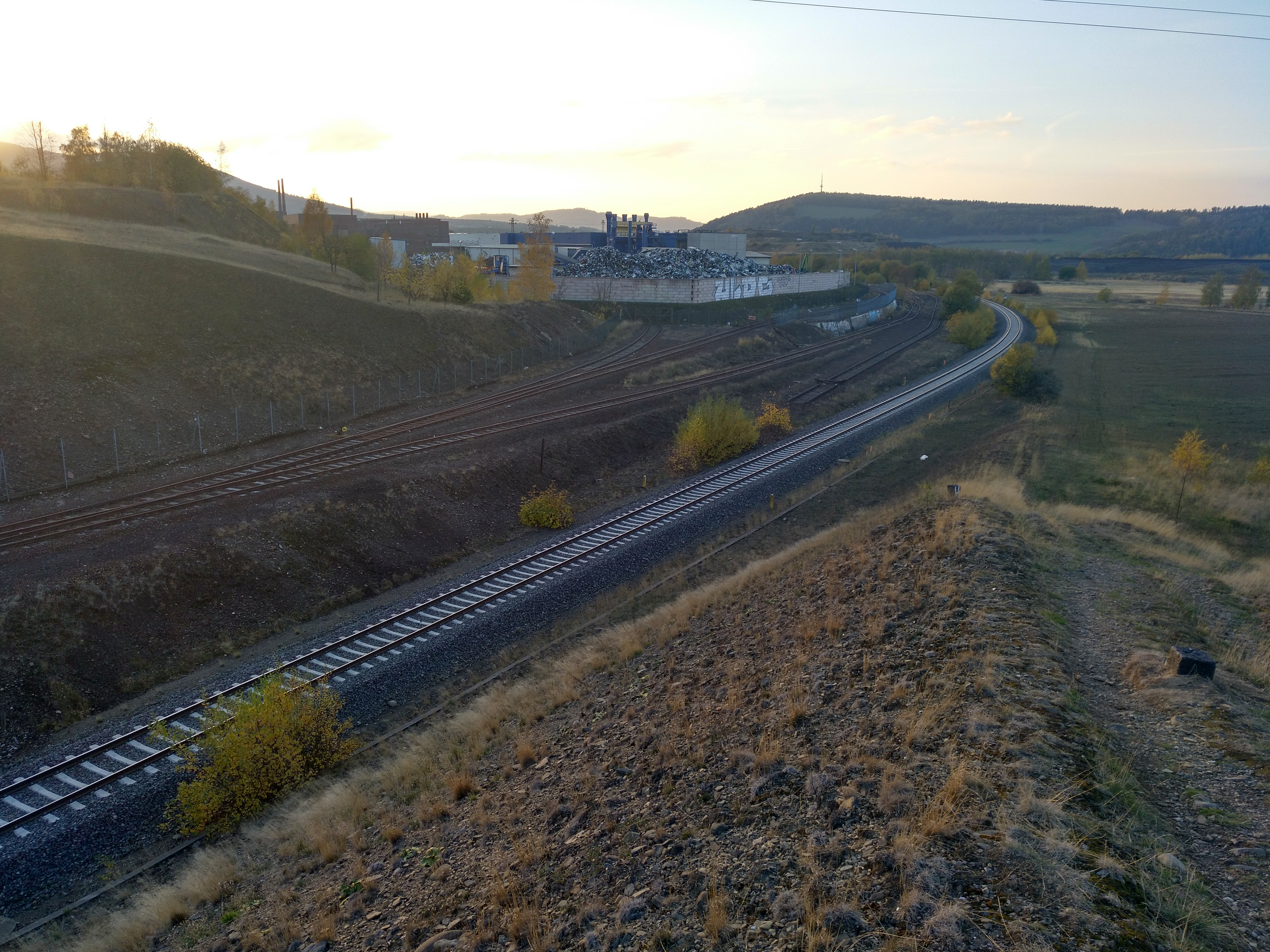
- Refurbished railway near Harlingerode, 2018.

Overview
- Line number: 6425
- Locale: Lower Saxony, Germany

Service
- Route number: 320, 354

Technical
- Line length: 6.9 km (4.3 mi)
- Number of tracks: 1: Oker–Bad Harzburg
- Track gauge: 1,435 mm (4 ft 8 1/2 in) standard gauge

The Oker–Bad Harzburg railway is a branch line between Oker and Bad Harzburg on the northern edge of the Harz mountains in Germany. It was opened on May 1, 1912.

== Route ==
The 6.9 kilometre long route is single-tracked between Oker and Bad Harzburg.

== Operations ==
The line is worked by regional trains on the Kreiensen–Seesen–Goslar–Bad Harzburg and Hanover–Hildesheim–Goslar–Bad Harzburg route.
