= Bündheim =

Bündheim Binten (Low German)
- Stadtteil of Bad Harzburg
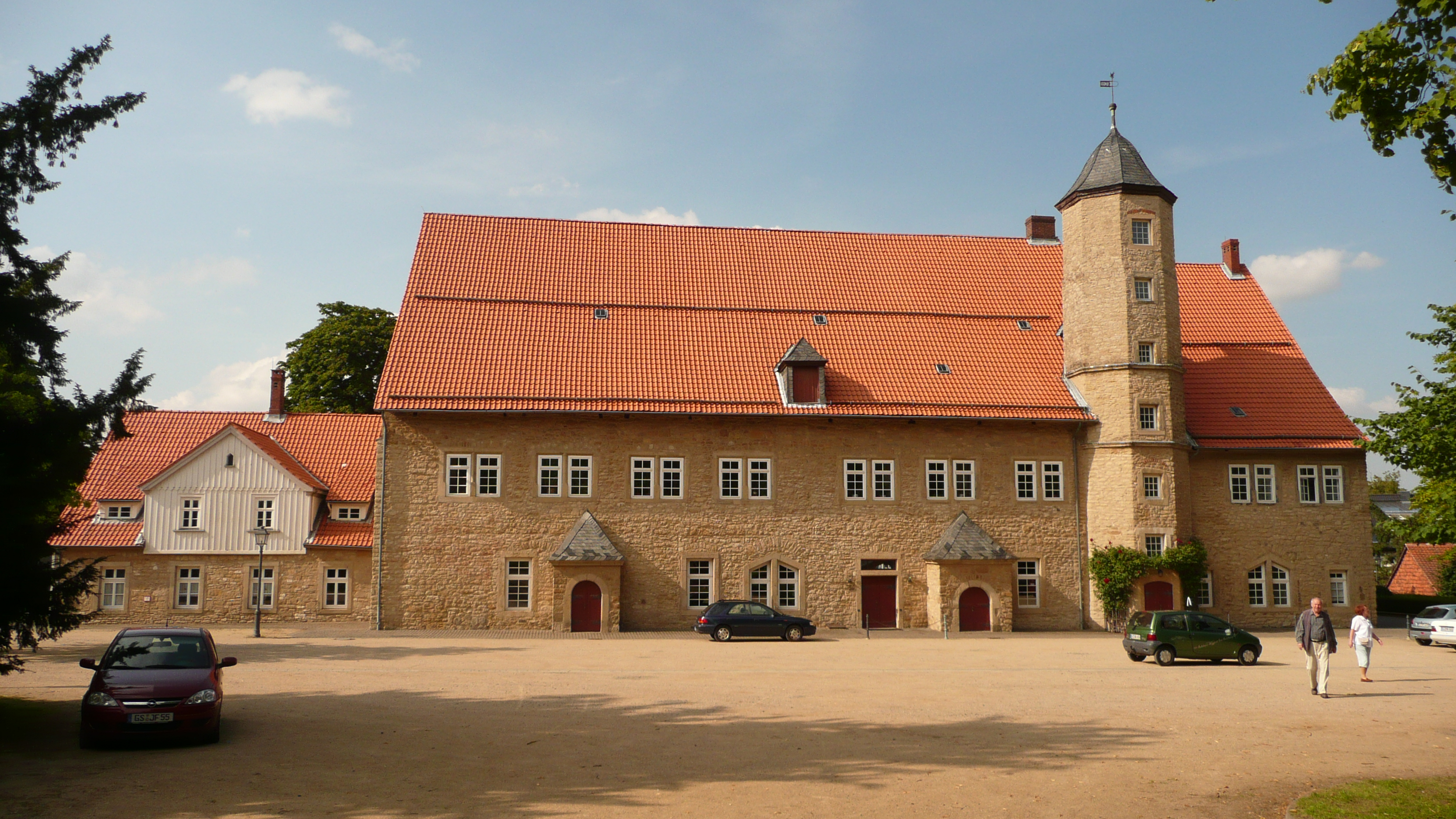
- Bündheimer Schloss (Bündheim castle)

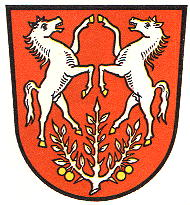
- Coat of arms
- Interactive map of Bündheim
- Location within Germany Location within Lower Saxony
- Coordinates: 51°53′24″N 10°32′49″E
- Country: Germany
- State: Lower Saxony
- District: Bad Harzburg
- Town: Bad Harzburg

Population (2020-12-31)
  - Total: 5,204
- Time zone: UTC+01:00 (CET)
  - Summer (DST): UTC+02:00 (CEST)
- Postal codes: 38667
- Dialling codes: 05322
- Vehicle registration: GS

Bündheim (German: [ˈbʏnthaɪm]; Oker dialect: Binten [ˈbɪntən]) is a village that forms a part (Stadtteil) of Bad Harzburg in the district of Goslar in Lower Saxony, Germany. As of 2020, Bündheim had a population of 5,204.

== Geography ==
Bündheim is positioned between the Harz mountains to the south and the valley of the Radau to the north. The residential area is merged with those of Schlewecke and Bad Harzburg city. The Bleiche, a tributary of the Radau, flows through Bündheim.

== History ==
Historical populations
| Year | Pop. | ±% |
|---|---|---|
| 1798 | 625 | — |
| 1849 | 1,116 | +78.6% |
| 1871 | 1,489 | +33.4% |
| 1925 | 3,048 | +104.7% |
| 1939 | 3,519 | +15.5% |
| 1975 | 7,500 | +113.1% |
| 2011 | 5,213 | −30.5% |
| 2015 | 5,195 | −0.3% |
| 2018 | 5,238 | +0.8% |
| 2020 | 5,204 | −0.6% |
1798, 1849 and 1871, 1925–1939, 1975 (estimated), 1997, since 2011.

=== Etymology ===
The name Bündheim is a composition of a word cognating to Old High German biunda (separated private lot), meaning that Bündheim was originally part of Schlewecke and later manifested as an own community. Other names were:

- 1251: Buntem
- 1353: Büntem
- 1459: Bünthem
- 19th century: Büntheim
- 20th century: Bündheim

=== Timeline ===
It had been seat of the administrative district of Bad Harzburg since 1573 and played a crucial role in the formation of Bad Harzburg. The Bündheim castle as the seat of this district was destroyed in 1626 during Thirty Years' War, after it reconstruction it had to be torn down owing to construction errors.

On January 1, 1963, Bündheim merged with Schlewecke to the new community Bündheim-Schlewecke that was incorporated into Bad Harzburg nine years later, on July 1, 1972.

== Infrastructure ==
Bündheim is penetrated by the Landesstraße L 501, leading from Eckertal at the border to Saxony-Anhalt through Bad Harzburg to Göttingerode and Oker. Until the 1980s, this route was part of the Bundesstraße 6.

== Gallery ==
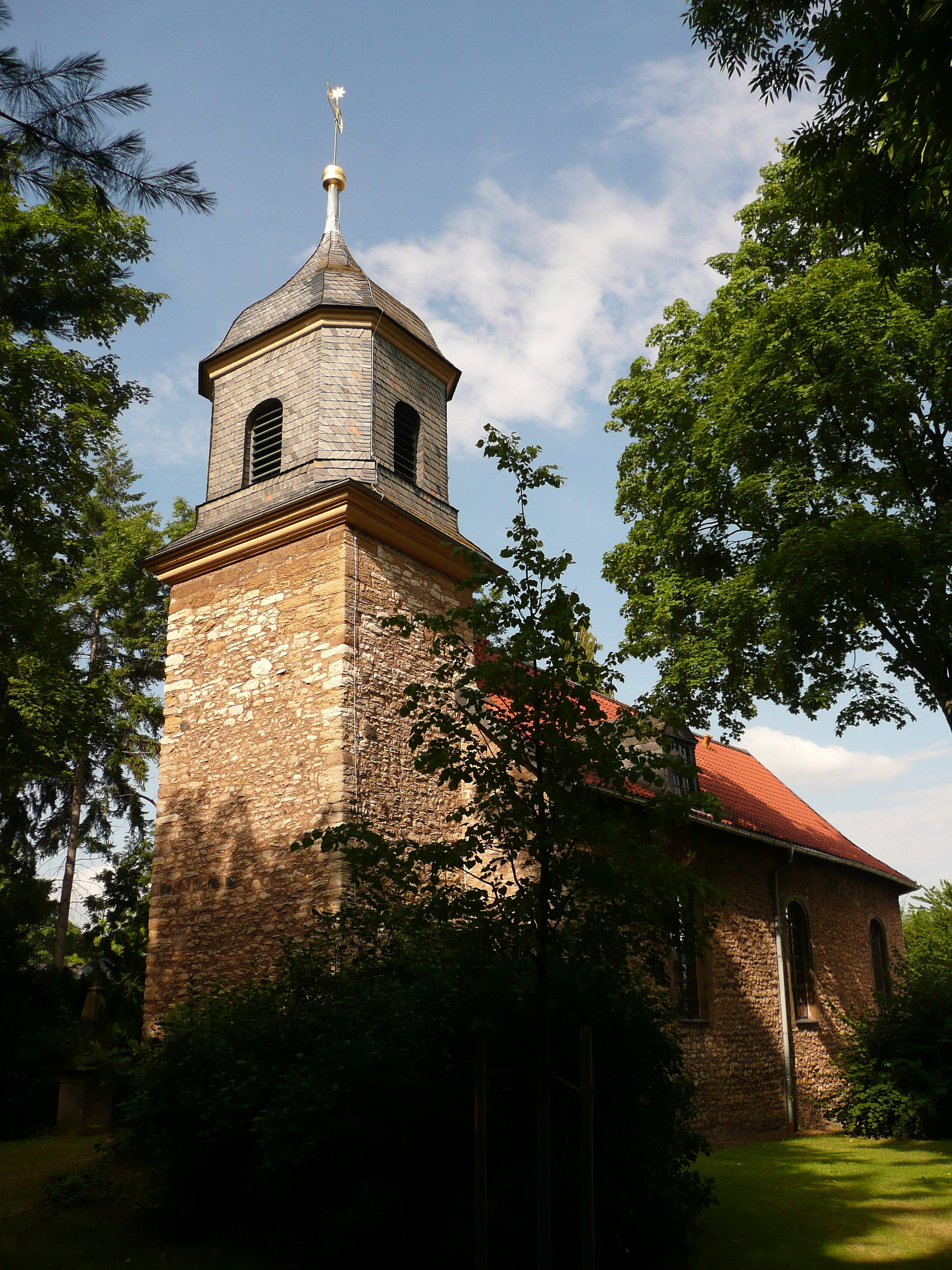
Lutheran Andreas church

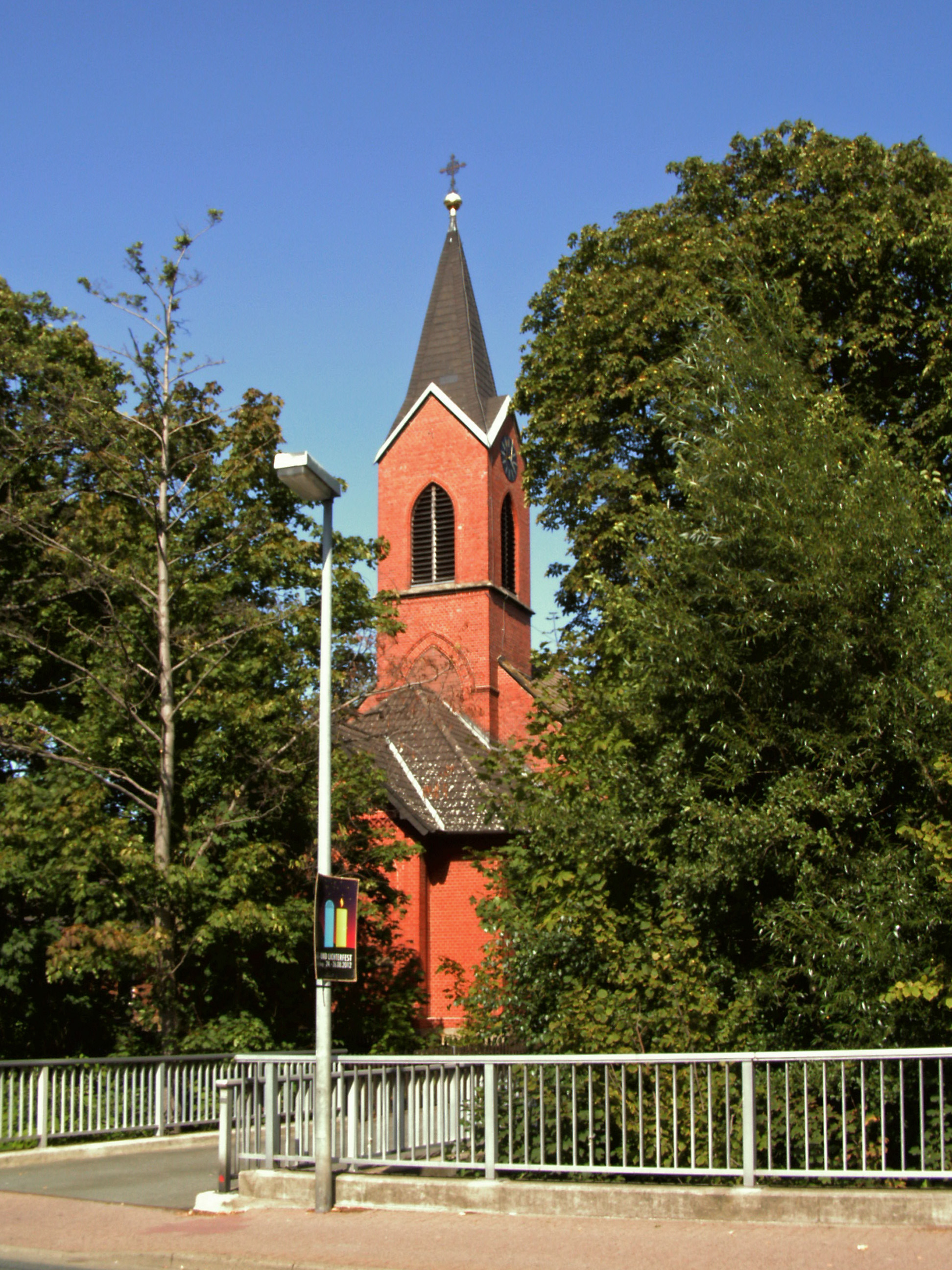
Catholic St. Gregor VII. church

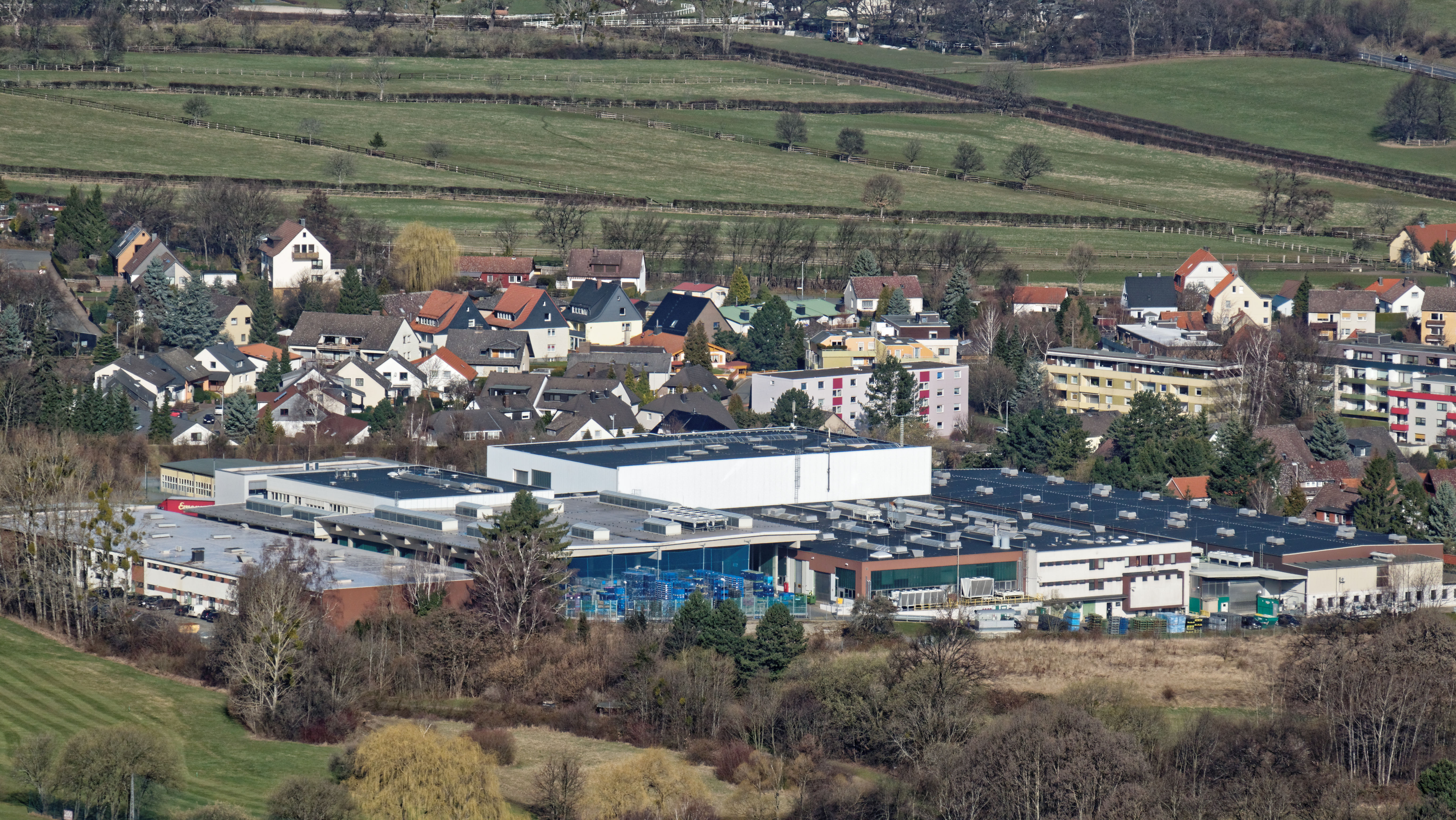
Industry in Bündheim
