= Schlewecke (Bad Harzburg) =

- Stadtteil of Bad Harzburg
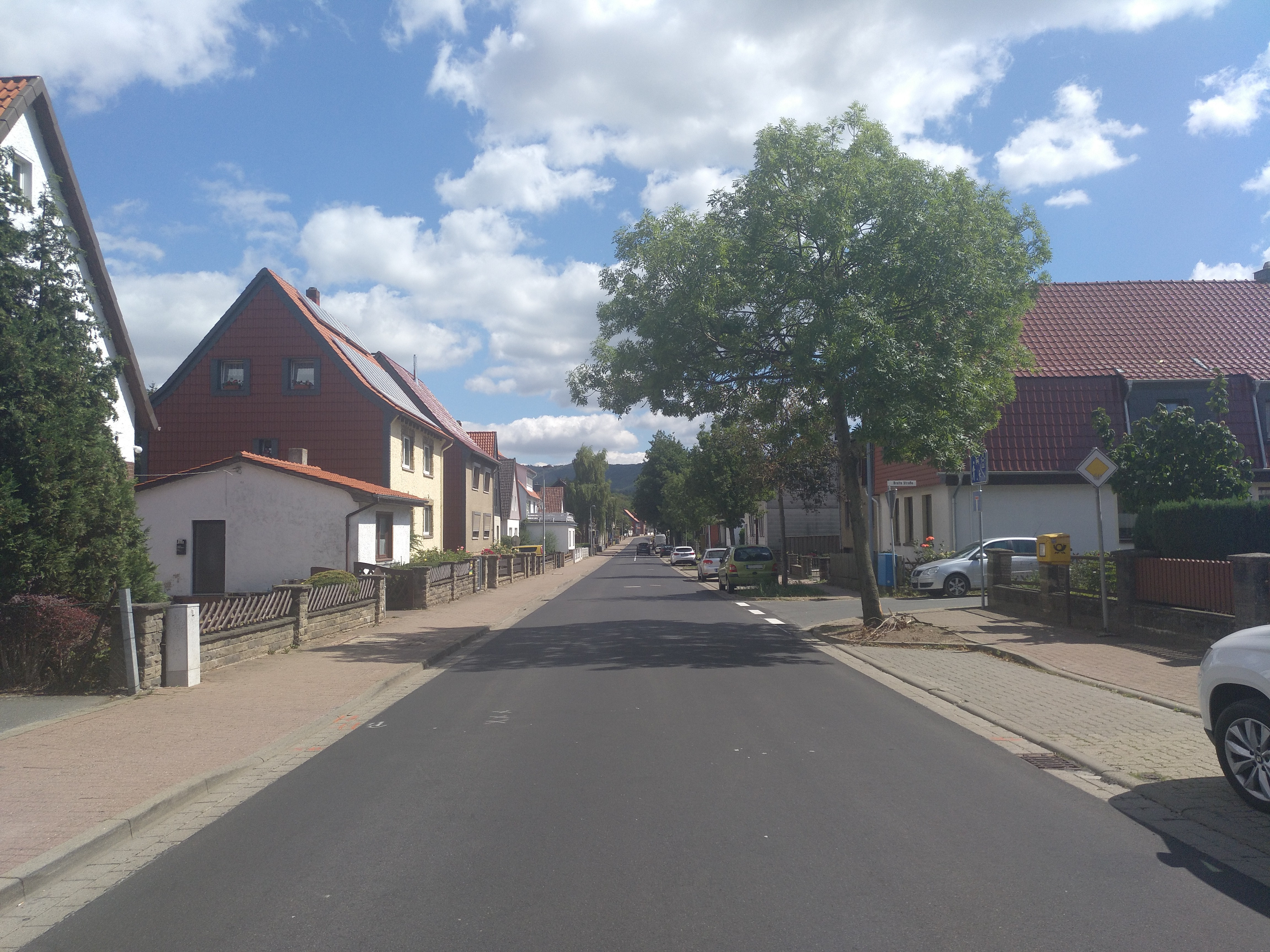
- Street in Schlewecke, 2018

- Coat of arms
- Interactive map of Schlewecke
- Location within Germany Location within Lower Saxony
- Coordinates: 51°53′51″N 10°32′15″E
- Country: Germany
- State: Lower Saxony
- District: Bad Harzburg
- Town: Bad Harzburg

Population (2020-12-31)
  - Total: 1,667
- Time zone: UTC+01:00 (CET)
  - Summer (DST): UTC+02:00 (CEST)
- Postal codes: 38667
- Dialling codes: 05322
- Vehicle registration: GS

Schlewecke (German pronunciation: [ˈʃleːˌvɛkə]), in Oker dialect: Sleiwecke (Low German pronunciation: [ˈslɛiˌvɛkə]) is a village that forms a part (Stadtteil) of Bad Harzburg in the district of Goslar in Lower Saxony, Germany. As of 31 December 2020, Schlewecke had a population of 1,667.

== Geography ==
The district is located between Bündheim to the southeast, Göttingerode to the west, Harlingerode to the northwest and Westerode to the northeast.

== History ==
Historical populations
Year	Pop.	±%
1798	285	—
1885	518	+81.8%
1925	1,191	+129.9%
1939	1,225	+2.9%
1977	1,530	+24.9%
2005	1,883	+23.1%
2010	1,819	−3.4%
2015	1,739	−4.4%
2018	1,753	+0.8%
2020	1,667	−4.9%
1798, 1849 and 1871, 1925–1939, 1975 (estimated), 1997, since 2011.

=== Etymology ===
Schlewecke was first mentioned in 1147 as Sleueken and in 1180 as Sclivede. The suffix Schle- stems from a Proto-Germanic root *slaihwō and cognates to German Schlehe and English Sloe. The prefix either means "creek" or cognates to English -th, as in "wealth", "strength". Other names were Slevedhe and ' Slyofede.

=== Timeline ===
Schlewecke was always an unimportant village of farmers and woodcutters. The recent church was built in 1708.

On January 1, 1963, the community of Schlewecke merged with Bündheim to Bündheim-Schlewecke, that again became part of Bad Harzburg on July 1, 1972.

== Gallery ==
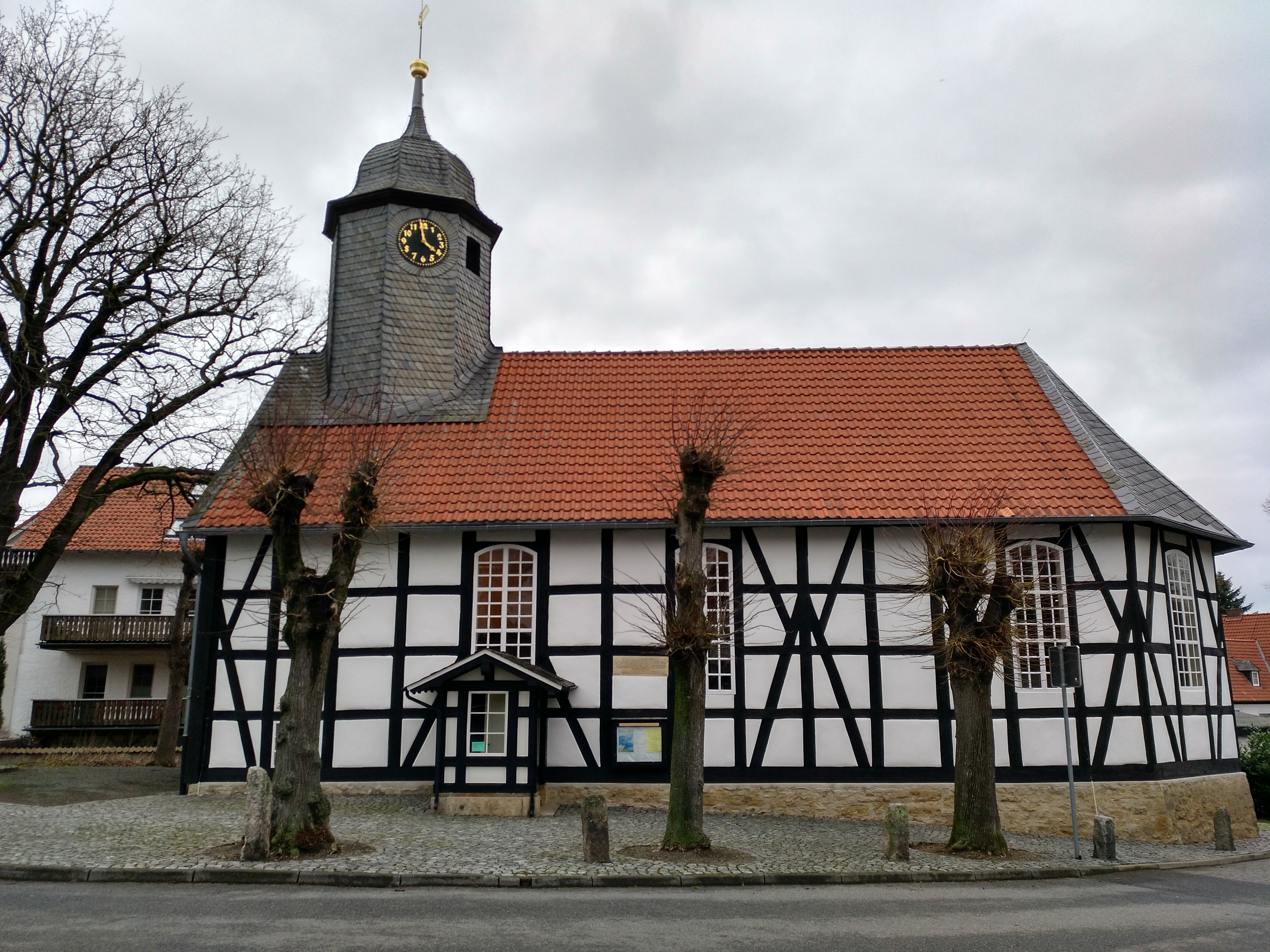
Lutheran church

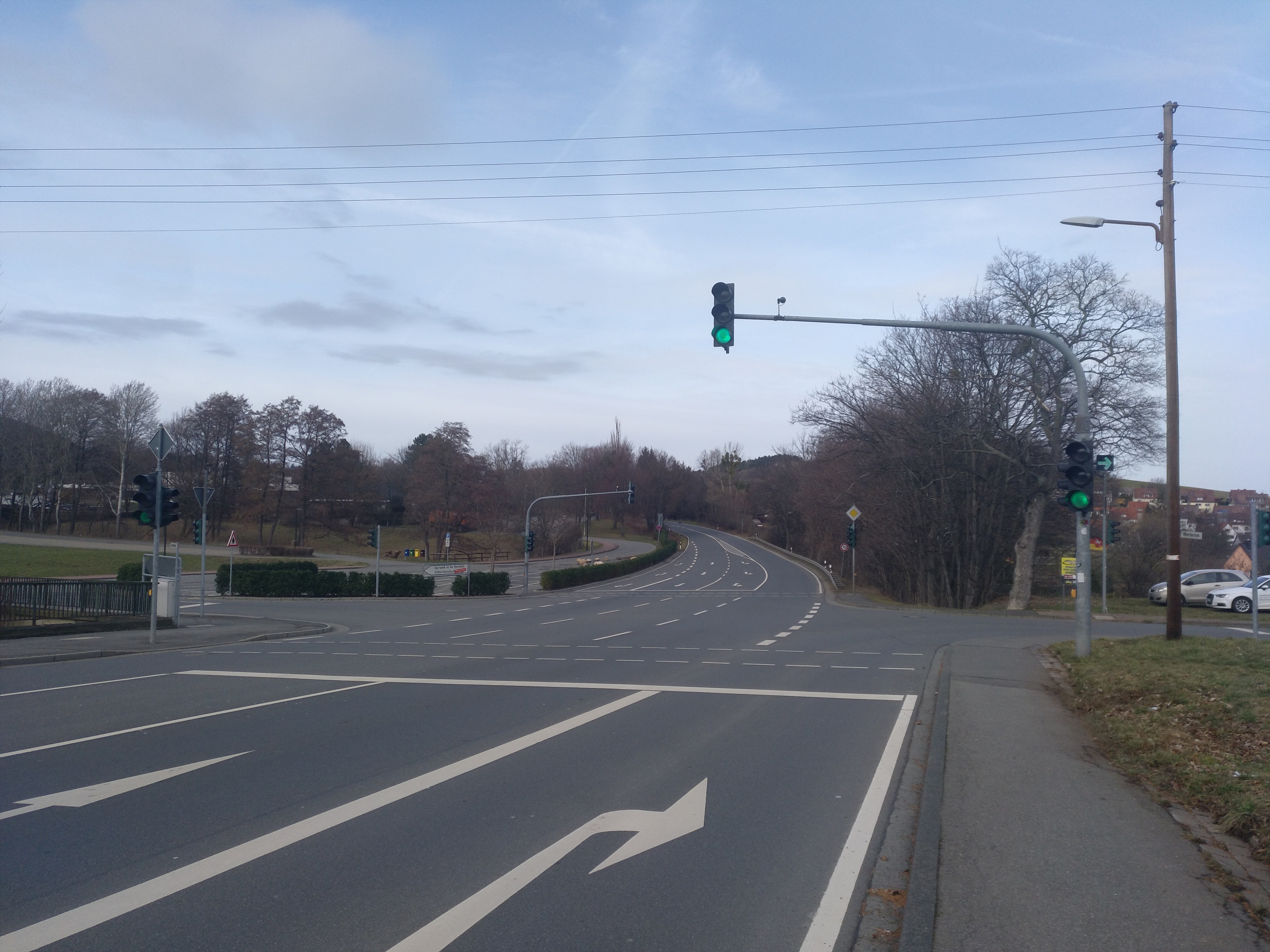
Former Bundesstraße 6
