= Kaiser Way =

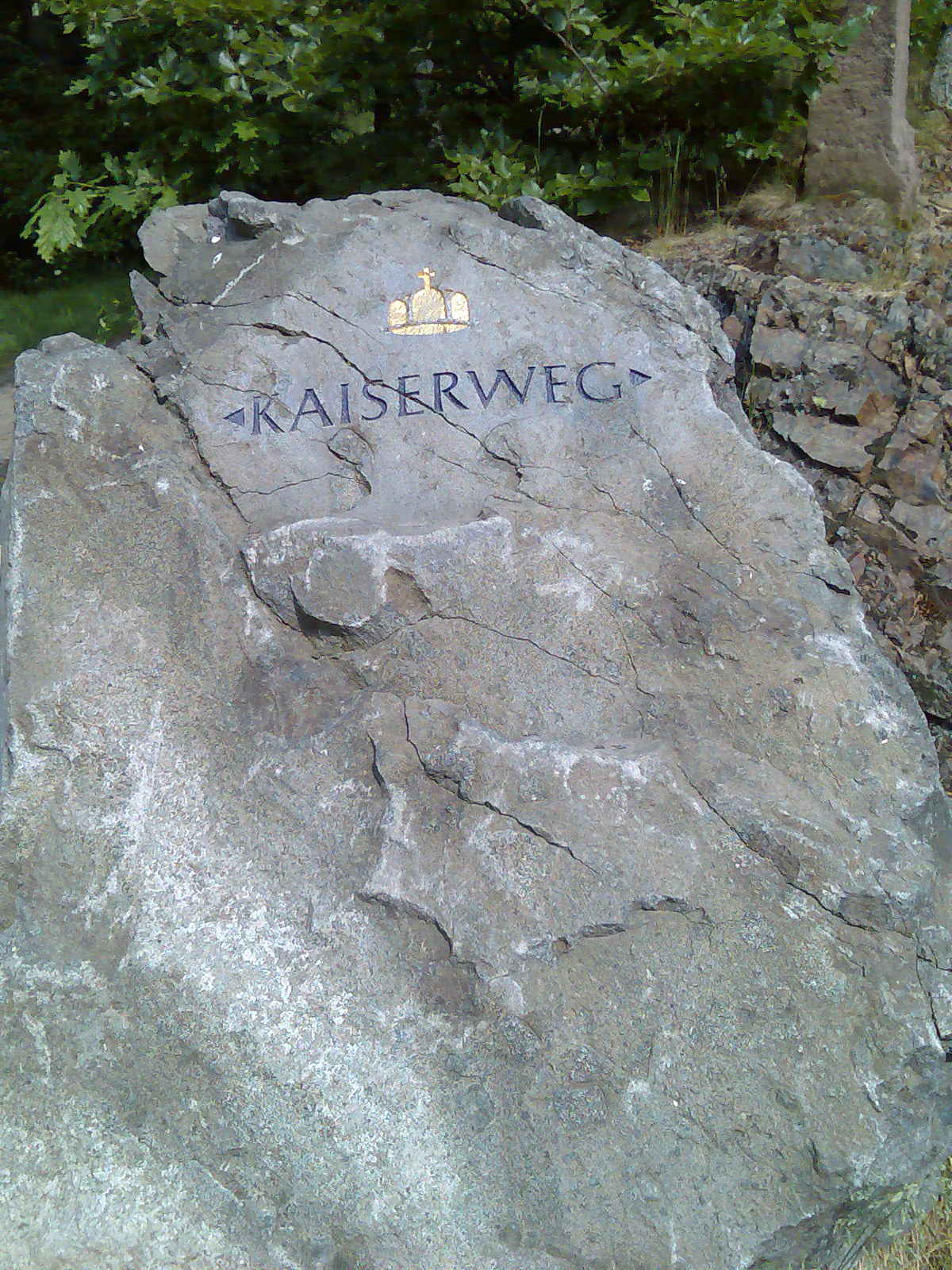
Stone by the wayside (Antoniusplatz on the Burgberg, 461 m AMSL) above Bad Harzburg

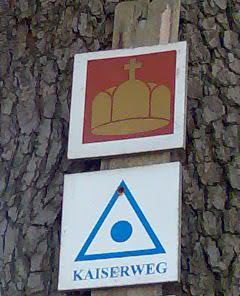
Signage

The Kaiser Way (German: Kaiserweg), literally "Emperor Way", is a thematic long distance footpath in the Harz mountains of Germany, which is about 110 km long and crosses both the Harz and the Kyffhäuser hills. From Goslar and Bad Harzburg on the northern edge of the Harz it runs across the Harz to Walkenried in the south; and then via Nordhausen to Tilleda on the Kyffhäuser.

== Route ==
Kaiserpfalz Goslar - Oker - Bad Harzburg - Molkenhaus - Königskrug - Kapellenfleck - Helenenruh - Walkenried - Ellrich - Kammerforst - Woffleben - Komödienplatz - Salza - Nordhausen - Heringen - Hamma - Badra - Kyffhäusergebirge - Königspfalz Tilleda.

The starting point for the Kaiser Way depends on one's interpretation. One view sees the Kaiser Way beginning as one of the "Ways of the German Emperors and Empresses of the Middle Ages in the Harz" (Wege Deutscher Kaiser and Könige des Mittelalters in the Harz) at the Kaiserpfalz Goslar and running along the northern perimeter of the Harz, initially in an easterly direction, via Oker to Bad Harzburg. Here is where the real Kaiser Way begins! From Bad Harzburg it climbs southwards into the Harz National Park (Harzquerung) via Molkenhaus to Königskrug, then descends to Walkenried on the southern edge of the Harz; it therefore crosses the Harz on its north-south axis, keeping to the mountain ridges and avoiding the valleys and then runs along the southern edge of the Harz from Lower Saxony into Thuringia. Via Ellrich, the Kammerforst and Woffleben it then continues east to Nordhausen. From there it passes through the Goldene Aue (Heringen - Hamma - Badra) to the Kyffhäuser. It crosses the heights - the walker switching from Thuringia (KYF) to Saxony-Anhalt (SGH and MSH) - and reaches the "village of a thousand souls", Tilleda, and Königspfalz on the other side of this small range of hills.

The Kaiser Way thus runs through three federal states: Lower Saxony - Thuringia - Saxony-Anhalt, and also through several rural districts: Goslar (GS) - Göttingen (GÖ) - Nordhausen (NDH) - Kyffhäuserkreis (KYF) - Sangerhausen (SGH, today Mansfeld-Südharz MSH). This is the actual route of the Kaiser Way, an "old trade route over the Harz, named after the flight of Emperor Henry IV from his Harzburg Castle to the shelter of abbeys in the South Harz and to Tilleda in the year 1074". Despite that, there is also a bigger network of paths in the East Harz which goes by the name "Ways of the German Emperors and Empresses of the Middle Ages in the Harz" and also bears the imperial crown, but should not be referred to as the Kaiser Way.

== Description ==
This thematic footpath runs along an old, historic trail – the Kaiser Way. Until around the start of the 21st century, the few routes over the Harz were only steep footpaths, like the Weidenstieg and the Salzstieg. The footpath, bridleway and, later, drive, that is most steeped in history is the Kaiser Way.

As a 'high way' it followed the heights and avoided the deepest valleys, so that travellers expended the least possible amount of effort as they crossed the Harz. The way ran immediately past the Achtermann, at 926 m above NN the fourth highest mountain in the Harz after the Brocken, Wurmberg and Bruchberg.

The condition of the route is extremely varied and changeable. For example, in the National Park it is often a wide and well signed gravel path. In the South Harz and in Thuringia, where visitor congestion is less, the walker often has to negotiate poorly maintained paths. The path has tarmac, gravel and cobblestone sections as well as forest and field tracks of coarse stones, mud or sand, as well as sections through villages and towns.

== History ==
There were definite footpaths here even in prehistoric times, as can be deduced from the significant amount of Stone Age finds along the route.

In 744, the army of the Frankish major domo (Hausmeier) Pippin the Younger moved down this route.

Many great armies, but also goods of every sort, especially ore from the Rammelsberg, from Altenau and the Spitzberg were transported over the Harz on this route. The majority of the Kaiser Way is identical with the former Heidenstieg, which was called a via (road) in 1258.

The Kaiser Way derived its name from the successful escape of Emperor Henry IV in the night of 8/9 August 1073 from the Saxons. He fled from his castle on the Burgberg near Bad Harzburg via Walkenried and Ellrich to Eschwege on the River Werra. Later Henry the Lion in the year 1180, King Philip of Swabia 1200, Emperor Otto IV 1206/1208 and Emperor Frederick II, in the year 1219 took the same route over the Harz for their armies.

The way was never in a good condition. True, granite slabs, erratics and tree trunks were used to overcome the largest potholes, but as anything lost along the way belonged by right to the land lords, they were more interested in maintaining the poor condition of the route. All goods had to be transferred, whilst in the lowlands, from four-wheeled covered wagons to two-wheeled 'Harz carts' (Harzkarren), normally used for transporting ore.

Each cart was hauled by six to eight, or even more horses over the Harz. Deep ruts in the granite slabs between Königskrug and Oderbrück still bear witness today to this harsh chapter in the history of the Kaiserweg.

From 1899 to 1962, a railway halt on the South Harz Railway (Braunlage–Walkenried) called Kaiserweg was situated at the crossing of the path with the Landstraße from Wieda to Braunlage. Until 1963 wood was loaded here.

== Sources ==
- Wandern in the Westharz, Landesvermessungsamt Niedersachsen, Karte 1 des Wanderkartensets Wandern im Harz, 1:50.000, ISBN 978-3-89435-669-9.
- Südliches Harzvorland mit Kyffhäusergebirge und Hainleite, Karte WK50_56 des Thüringer Landesvermessungsamts, 1:50.000, ISBN 3-86140-244-0.
- Über den Harz, Natur erleben am Kaiserweg, Dr. K. George, Broschüre des Regionalverbandes Harz e.V., Quedlinburg 2006.
- Wandern auf dem Kaiserweg Harz, F. Genrich, 2007, BoD Norderstedt, ISBN 978-3-8370-4695-3.
