= Burgberg Cable Car =

Aerial lift in Bad Harzburg, Germany

Coordinates: 51°52′16″N 10°33′52″E

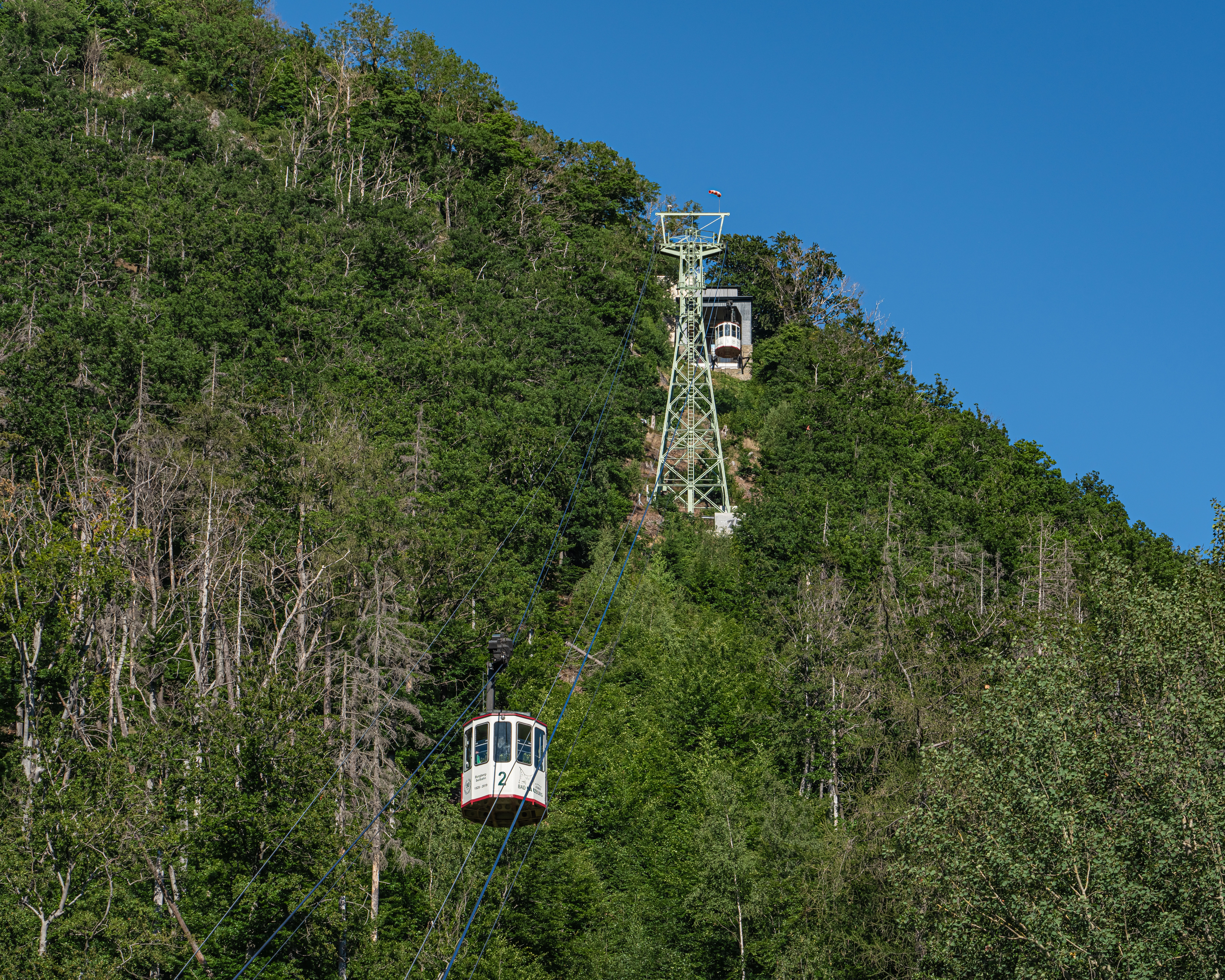
- View towards the Burgberg summit station from the valley station
- Interactive map of Burgberg Cable Car

Overview
- Status: Operational
- Character: Elevated
- Location: Bad Harzburg, Lower Saxony, Germany
- Termini: Bad Harzburg; Großer Burgberg hill
- No. of stations: 2
- Open: 1929

Technical features
- Aerial lift type: Cable car
- Line length: 1,580 ft (480 m)
- Notes: Elevation:611 ft (186 m); Electric motor powering cable bullwheel

The Burgberg Cable Car (German: Burgbergseilbahn) is a cable car in Bad Harzburg, Germany. It was built in 1929 by the Bleichert engineering corporation and has a length of 481 metres. Its hauling cable has a diameter of 18 mm, its carrying cable a diameter of 37 mm. It is driven by a 40 metric horsepower (39 hp) engine at the summit station. It has two cabins carrying up to 18 passengers each.

The cable car is named after the Burgberg mountain, site of the historic Harzburg Castle, built by Emperor Henry IV about 1068. The upper terminus was erected next to the ruins. Cable car and stations are preserved in their original 1920s condition.

The large gondolas transport passengers in three minutes to the Großer Burgberg (483 m). From there, there is a panoramic view of Bad Harzburg, the surrounding mountains and far across the Harz region. On the Burgberg are castle ruins to explore and trails for experienced and inexperienced hikers. It is also the jump-off point for many walks through the Harz to popular destinations such as the Molkenhaus or the crags of the Rabenklippen.

== Location and Technology ==
The cable car runs from the valley station (291.7 m above sea level; on the B 4) near the Radau River up to the mountain station, located near the summit of the Großer Burgberg at the ruins of the Harzburg (approx. 483 m above sea level). Over a length of 481 m, it overcomes an elevation difference of about 186 m. Integrated into the mountain station is a small museum that presents the history of the aerial tramway, built by the Leipzig company Adolf Bleichert & Co.

Worldwide, there are only two cable cars built in the same style as the one in Bad Harzburg—located in Bad Reichenhall and in Barcelona.

The cable car’s carrying rope has a diameter of 37 mm, and the traction rope a diameter of 18 mm. It is driven by a 45 hp electric motor housed in the mountain station; for emergency operation, there is a 40 hp diesel engine. The cable car has a 23.5 m-high support tower, located slightly above the meeting point of the two cabins. The maximum height above the ground of the cable car is 40 m.

A ride on the cable car lasts about 3 minutes. Each cabin can carry up to 19 people (18 passengers and 1 conductor). In 2023, the operator stated that around 250,000 passengers are transported annually.

== History ==
The cable car began operations in 1929. The builder, the Leipzig company Adolf Bleichert & Co., was at the time the leading firm in the construction of the then-new cable car technology. Since then, it has been operated by the city of Bad Harzburg.

Since 1929, the Burgberg Cable Car has been transporting guests to the Großer Burgberg at around 483 meters above sea level. The mountain offers a view of Bad Harzburg and the Harz foothills.

On April 2, 2011, the cable car recorded its 25-millionth passenger. One of the gondolas was refurbished in 2020.

From January to April 2023, the Burgberg Cable Car was renovated for one million euros. The entire technology was overhauled, including a new motor, new controls, and a new hydraulic speed and braking system. According to the operator, the renovation costs amounted to several hundred thousand euros.

== Bildergalerie ==
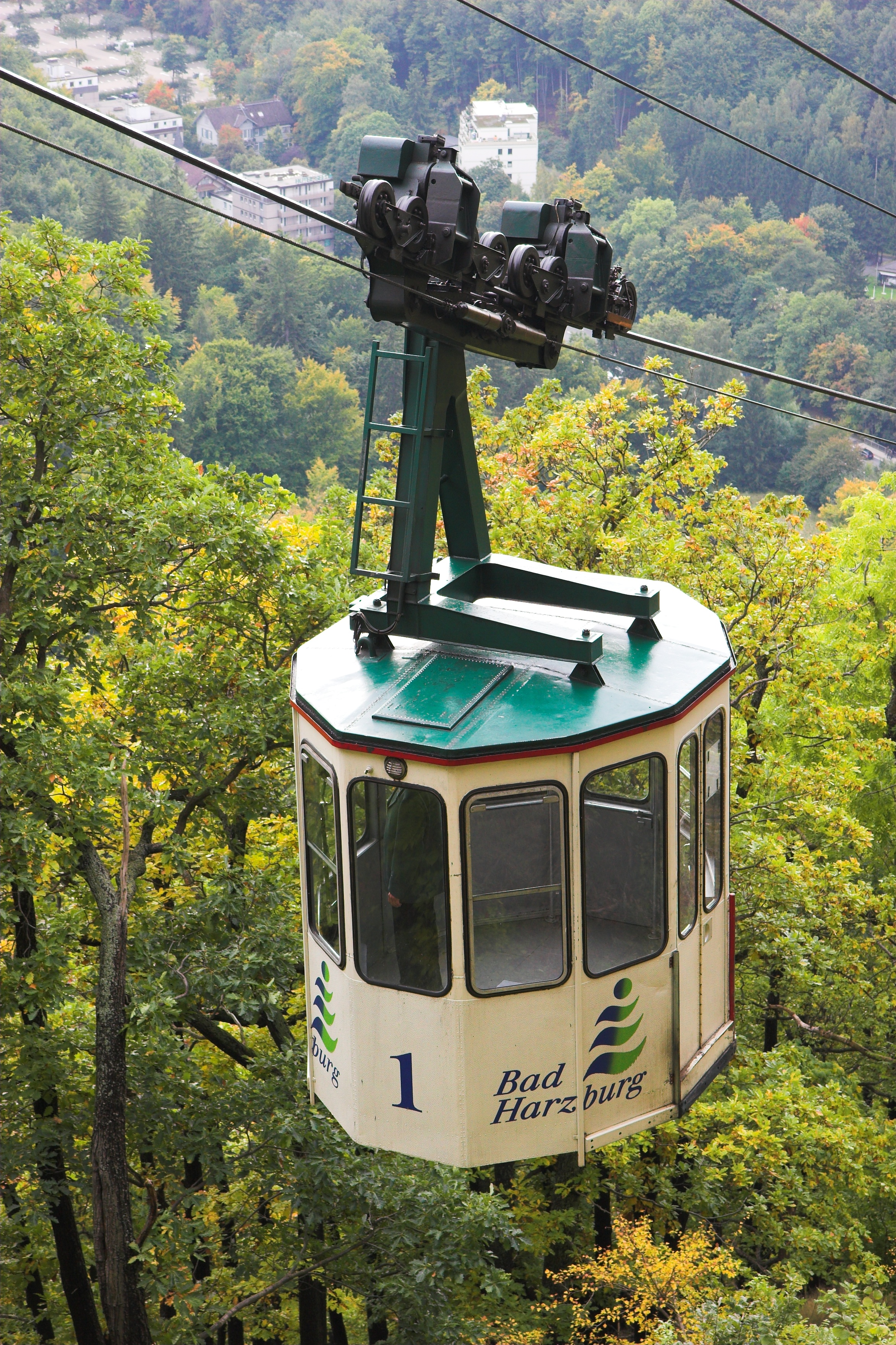
One of the two cable car cabins

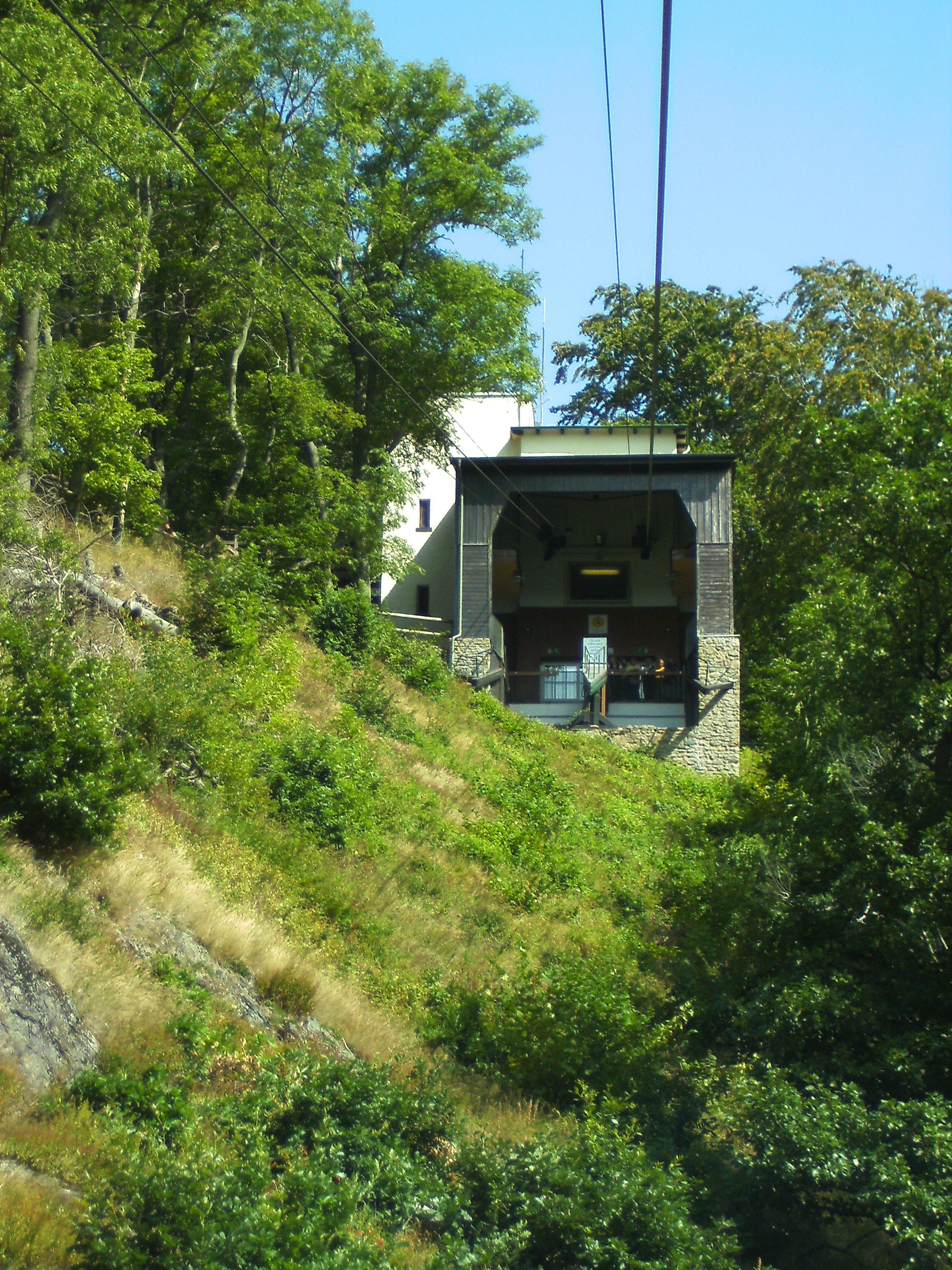
Mountain station, viewed from a gondola

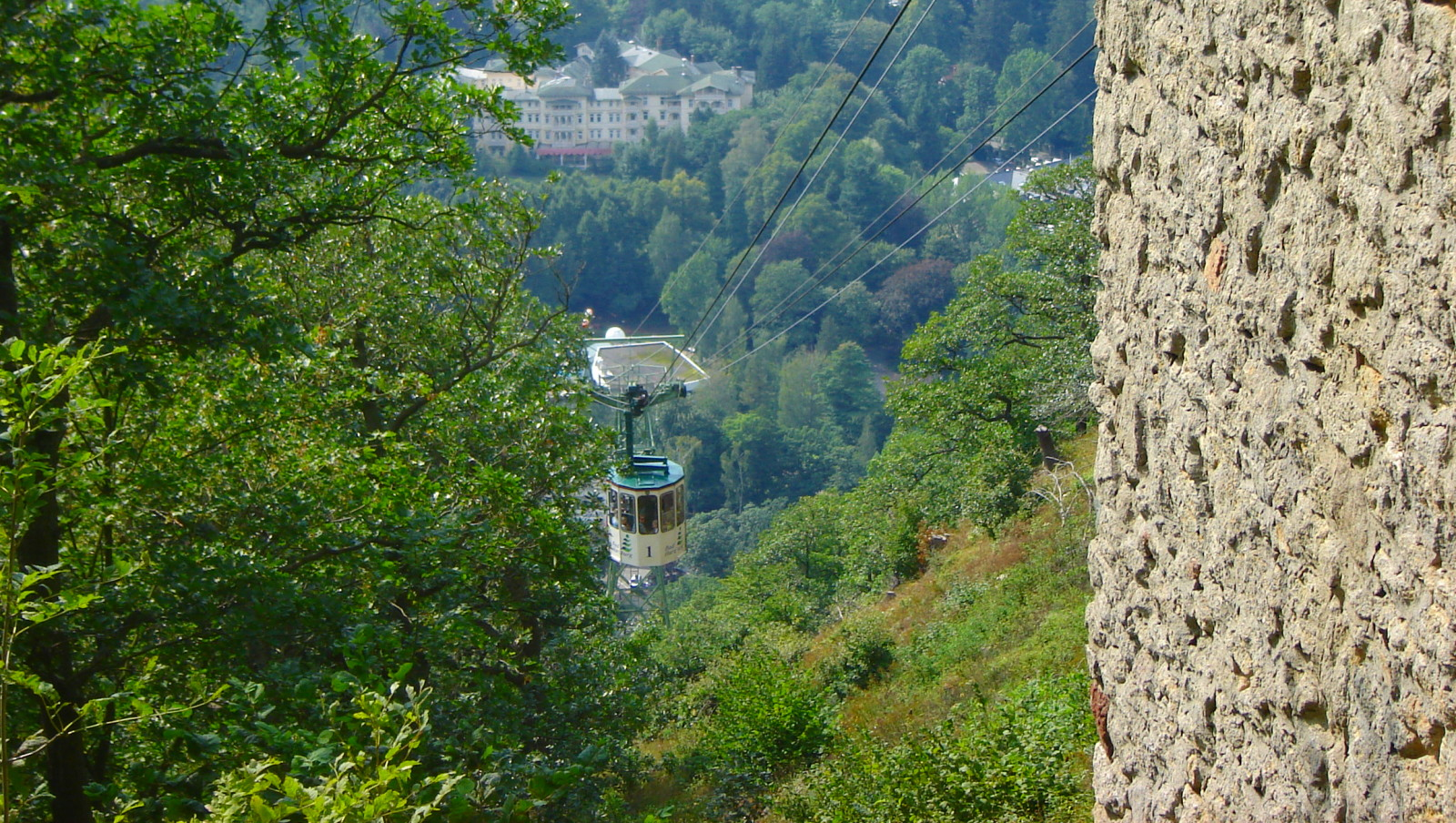
View from the mountain station onto the route of the cable car

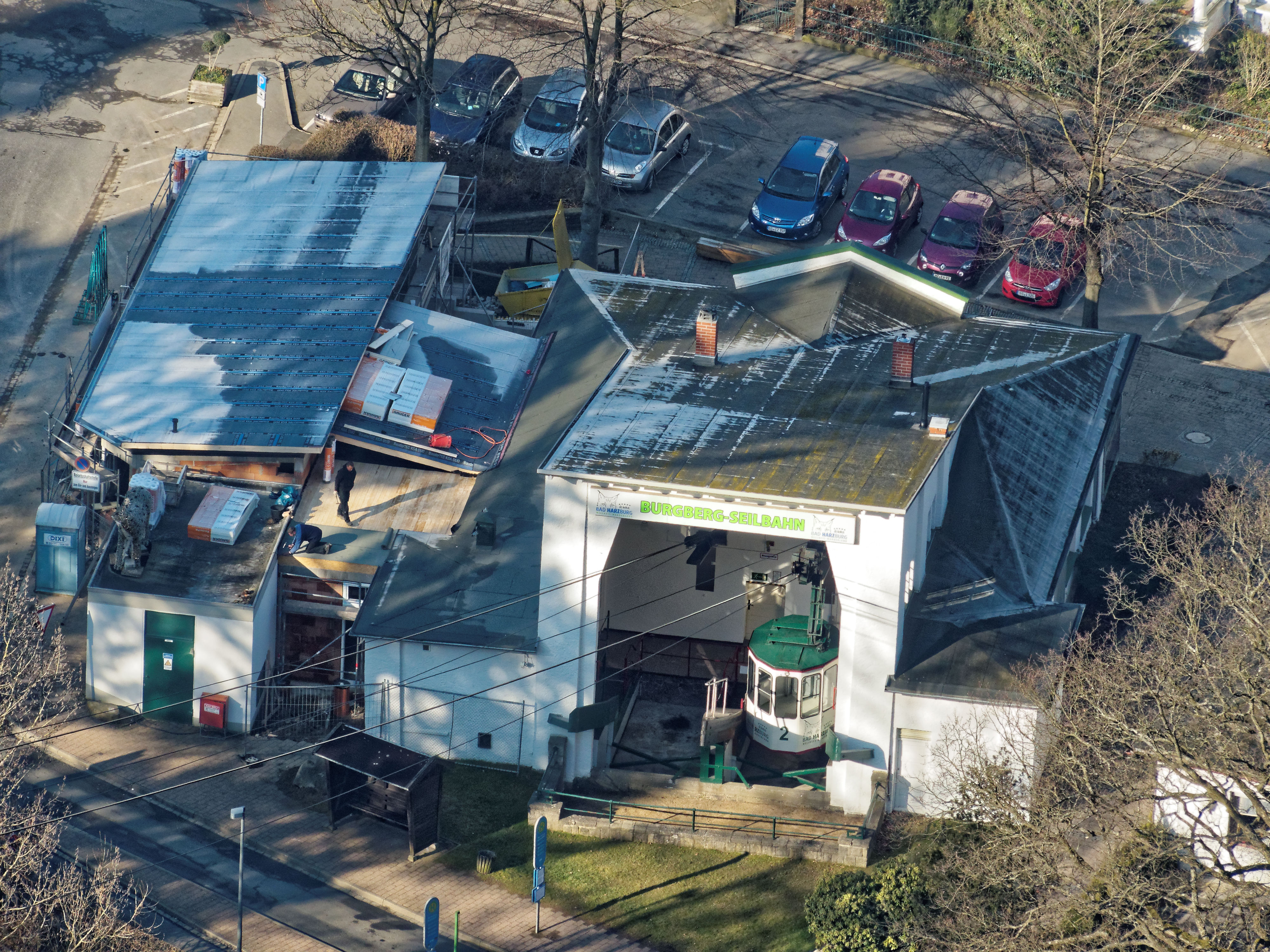
View from above of the valley station

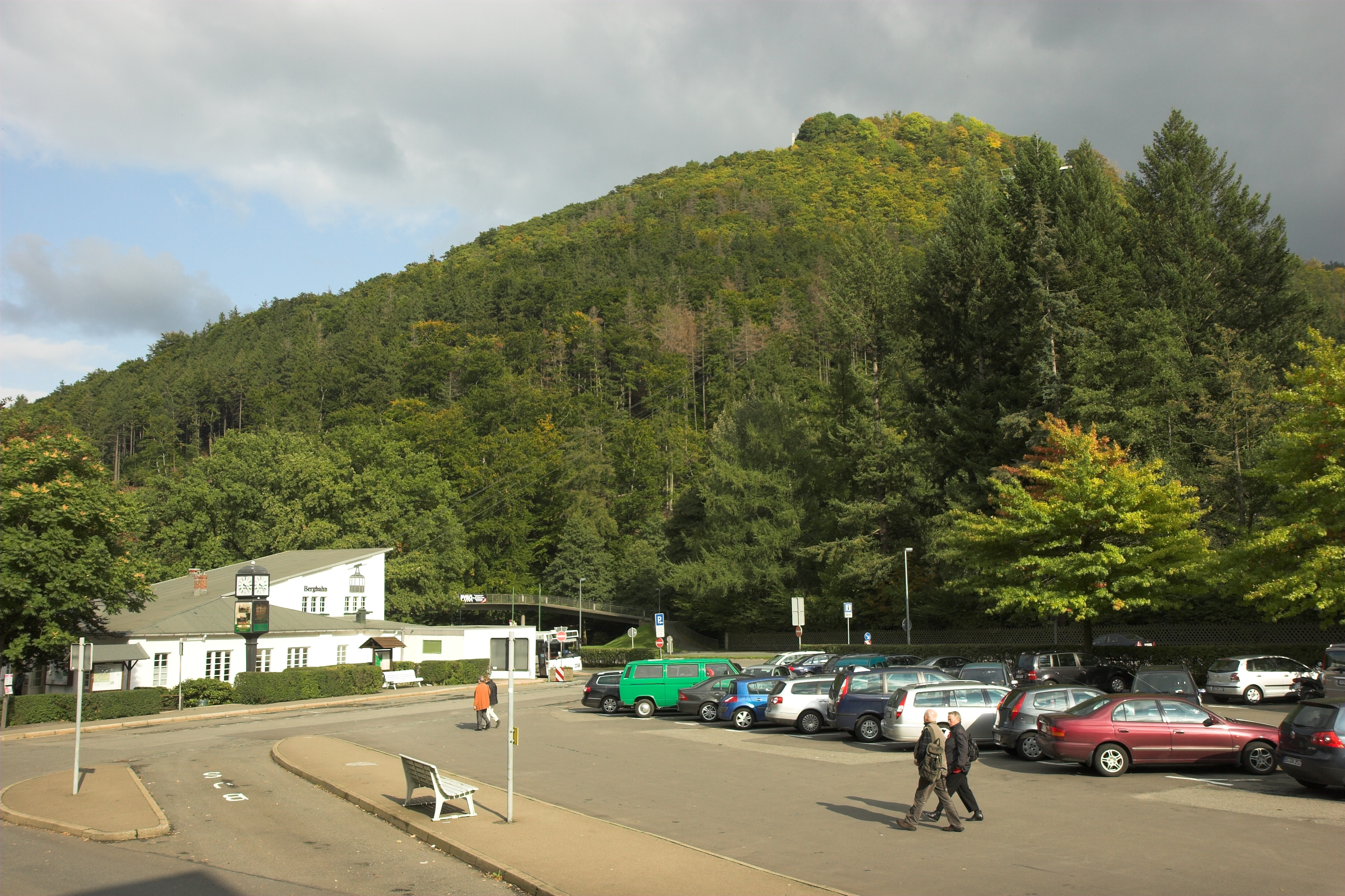
Valley station of the cable car

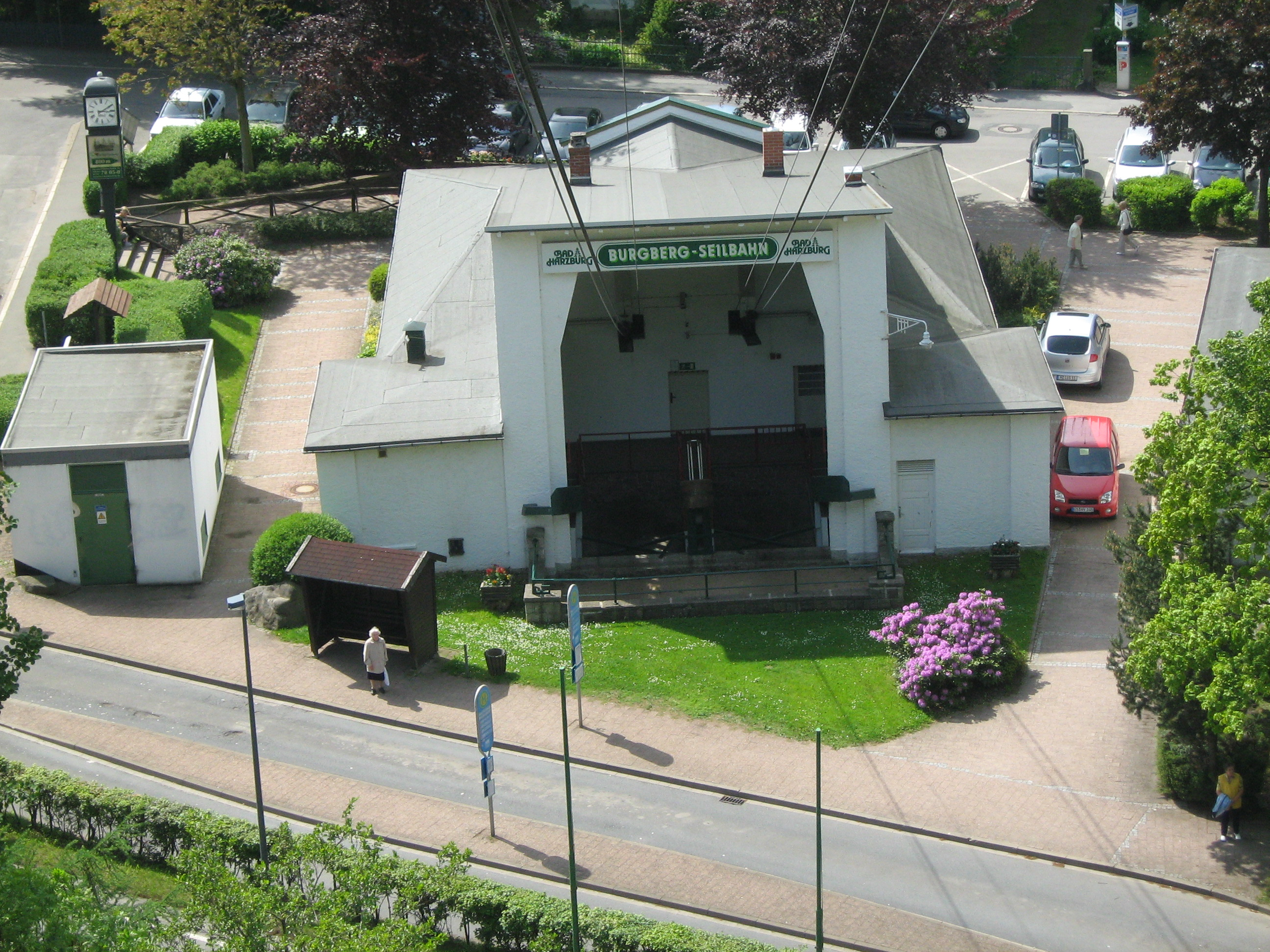
The valley station as seen from one of the gondolas, May 2009

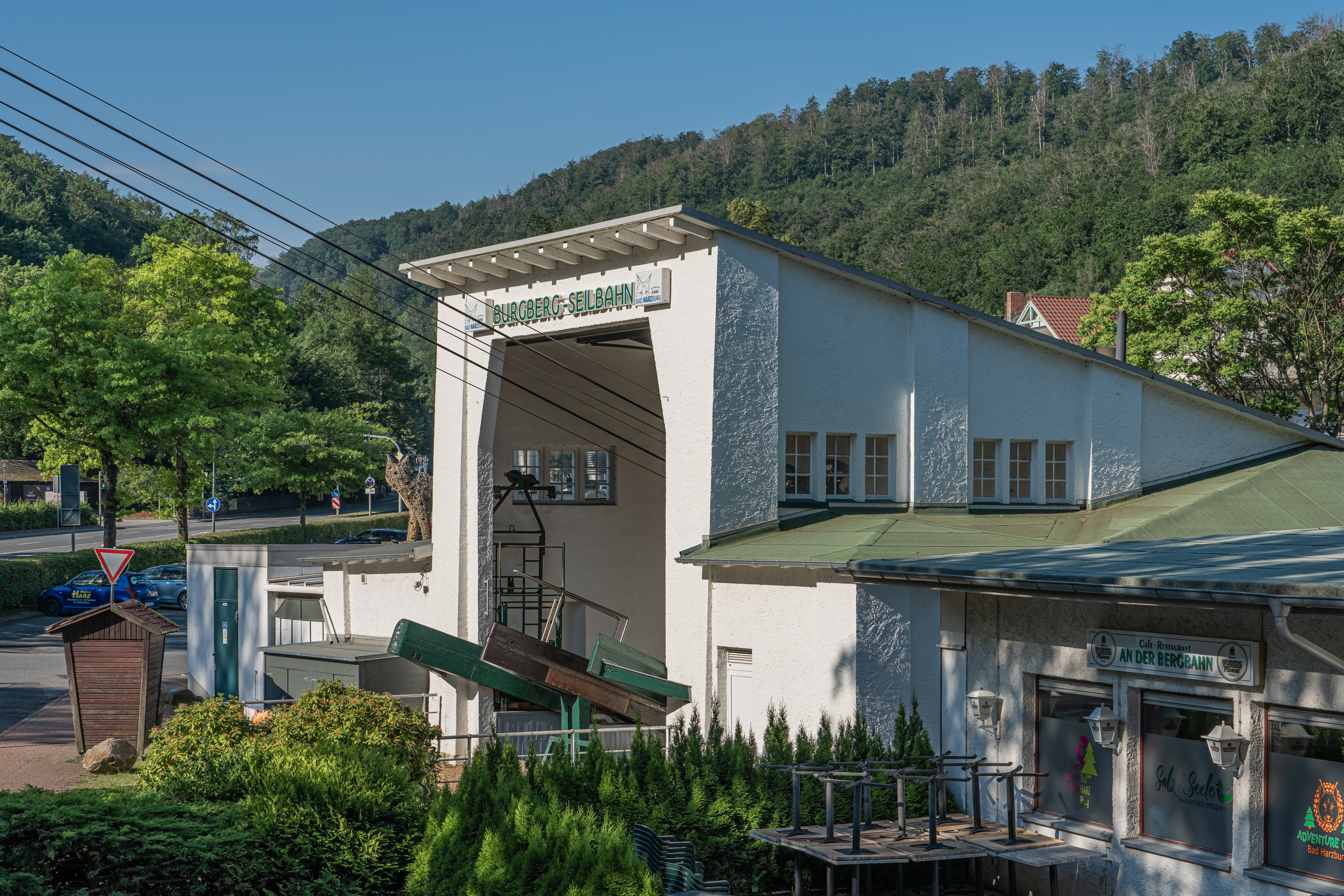
The valley station
