= Butterberg =

Butterberg is the name of several mountains and hills:

- in Germany:
  - Butterberg (Bad Harzburg) (308 m), in the Harz, near Bad Harzburg, Goslar district, Lower Saxony
  - Butterberg (Ilfeld) (539 m), in the Harz, near Ilfeld, Nordhausen district, Thuringia
  - Butterberg (Ilsenburg) (279 m), in the Harz, near Ilsenburg, Harz district, Saxony-Anhalt
  - Butterberg (Elmshorn), near Elmshorn, Pinneberg district, Schleswig-Holstein
  - Butterberg (Groß Pankow), Groß Pankow (Prignitz), Prignitz district, Brandenburg
  - Butterberg (Passee), near Passee, Nordwestmecklenburg district, Mecklenburg-Vorpommern
  - Butterberg (Bischofswerda) (385 m), near Bischofswerda, Bautzen district, Saxony
  - Butterberg (Schmölln-Putzkau) (388 m), near Tröbigau, Bautzen district, Saxony
  - Butterberg (Waltersdorf), near Waltersdorf, Görlitz district, Saxony
- in Poland:
  - Butterberg (Elbing Heights), in the Elbing Heights, Woiwodschaft Ermland-Masuren
- Villages:
  - the German name for the Czech village of Máselnik in the borough of Dubá
