= Westerode (Bad Harzburg) =

- Stadtteil of Bad Harzburg
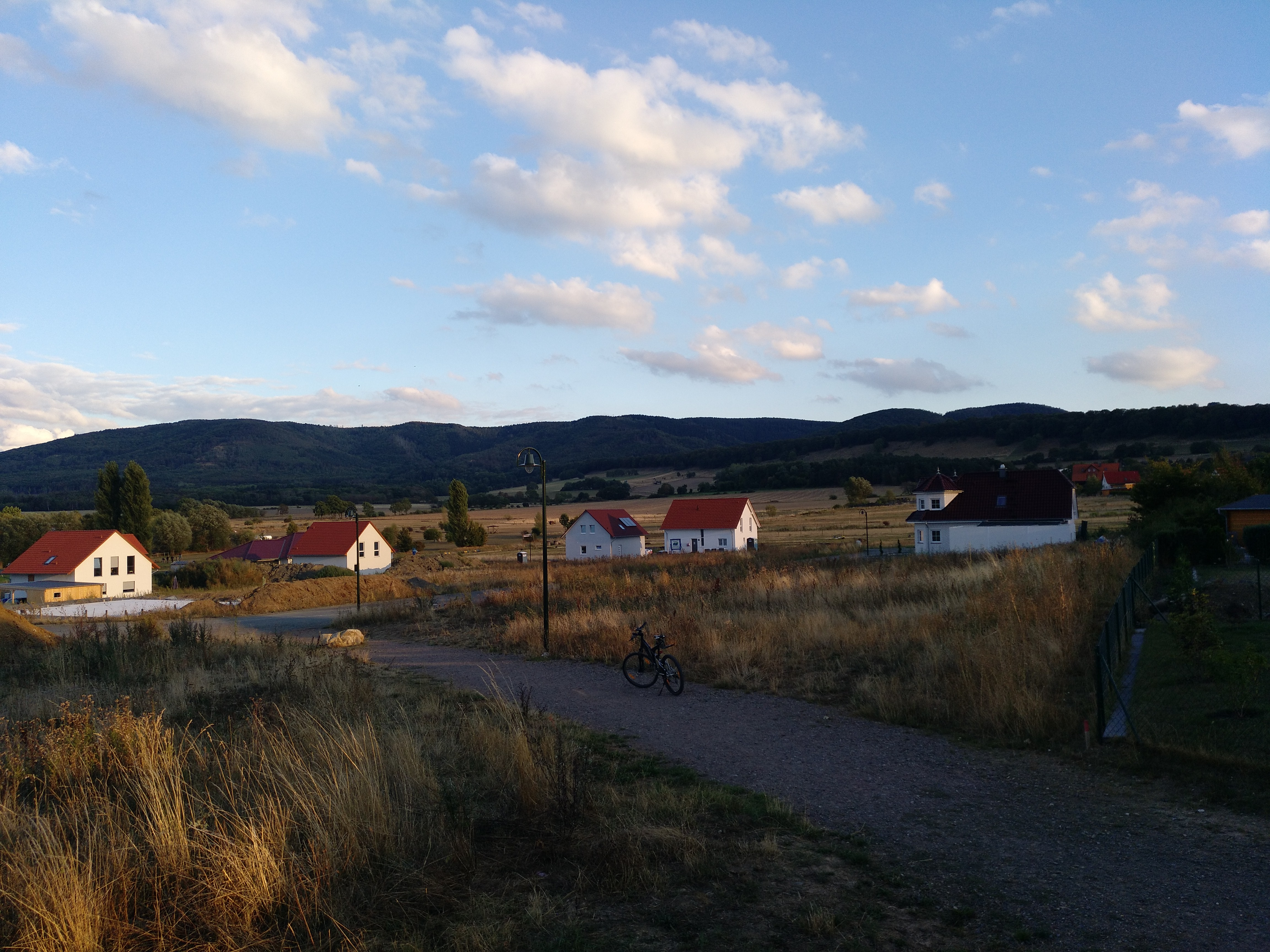
- Developing area in Westerode, 2018
- Interactive map of Westerode
- Location within Germany Location within Lower Saxony
- Coordinates: 51°54′10″N 10°33′44″E
- Country: Germany
- State: Lower Saxony
- District: Bad Harzburg
- Town: Bad Harzburg

Population (2020-12-31)
  - Total: 1,089
- Time zone: UTC+01:00 (CET)
  - Summer (DST): UTC+02:00 (CEST)
- Postal codes: 38667
- Dialling codes: 05322
- Vehicle registration: GS

Westerode (German pronunciation: [ˈvɛstəˌʁoːdə]) is a village that forms a part (Stadtteil) of Bad Harzburg in the district of Goslar in Lower Saxony, Germany. As of 31 December 2020, Westerode had a population of 1,089.

Historical populations
Year	Pop.	±%
1798	382	—
1863	475	+24.3%
1900	844	+77.7%
1939	1,016	+20.4%
1950	1,500	+47.6%
2005	1,148	−23.5%
2010	1,129	−1.7%
2015	1,065	−5.7%
2018	1,074	+0.8%
2020	1,089	+1.4%
1885–1939, estimated value for 1950, since 2011

== Geography ==
Westerode is located north of the Butterberg and Bad Harzburg city. It is penetrated by the Maschbach, a contributing creek of the Ecker.

== Gallery ==
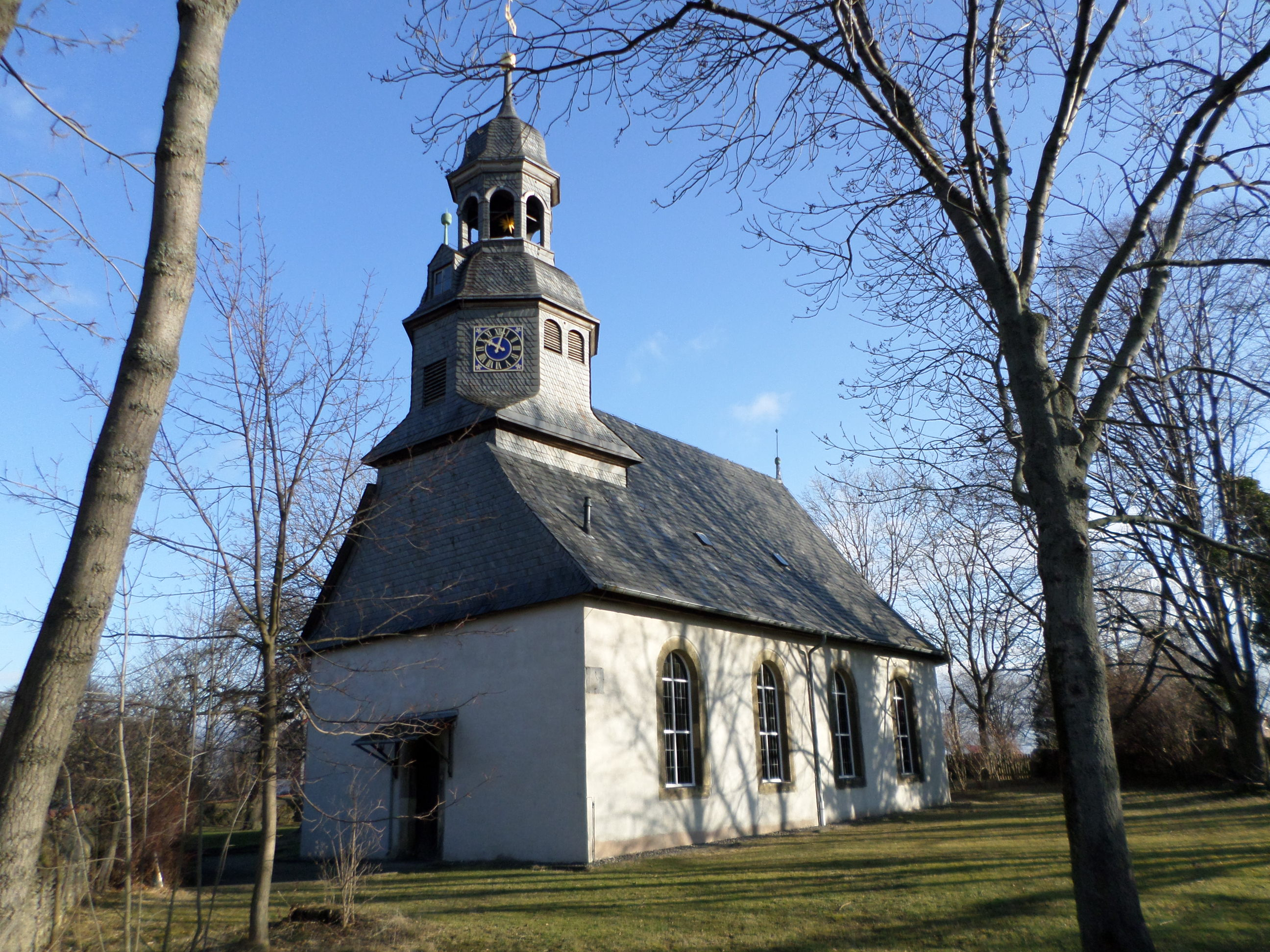
Lutheran St. Nicolai church

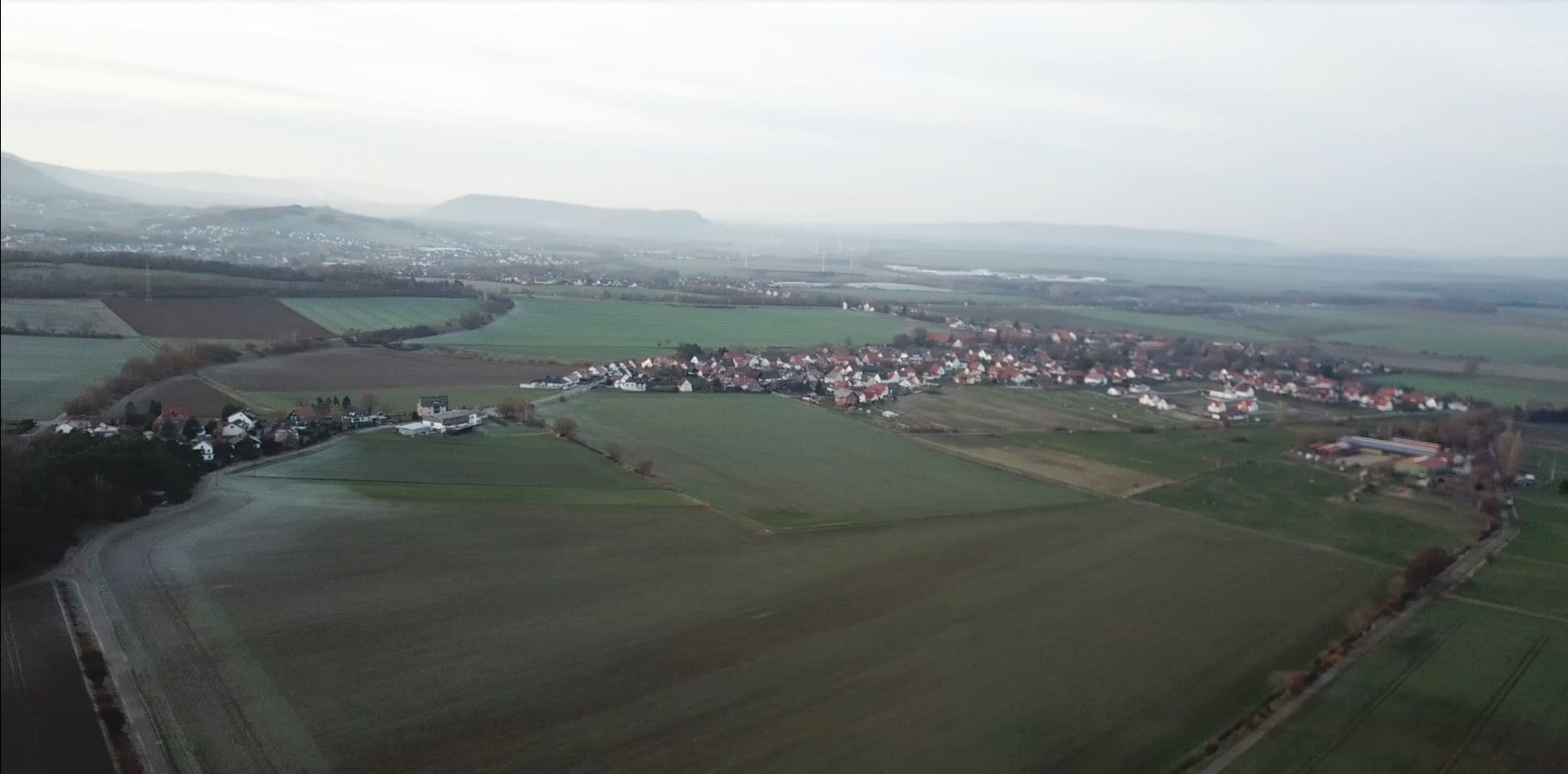
Westerode from the air
