= Rabenklippe =

Rock formation

Coordinates: 51°51′52″N 10°36′17″E

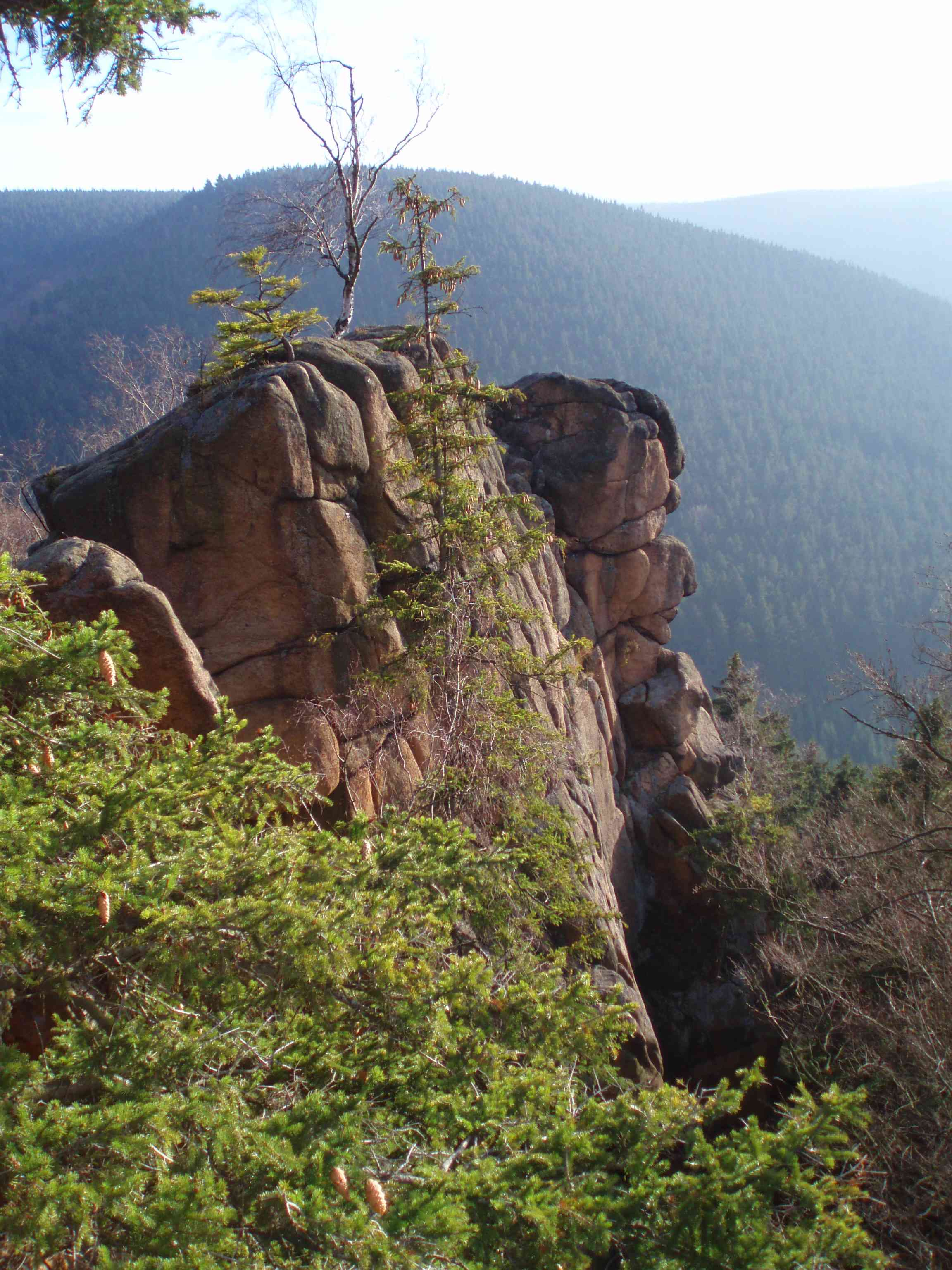
Rabenklippe

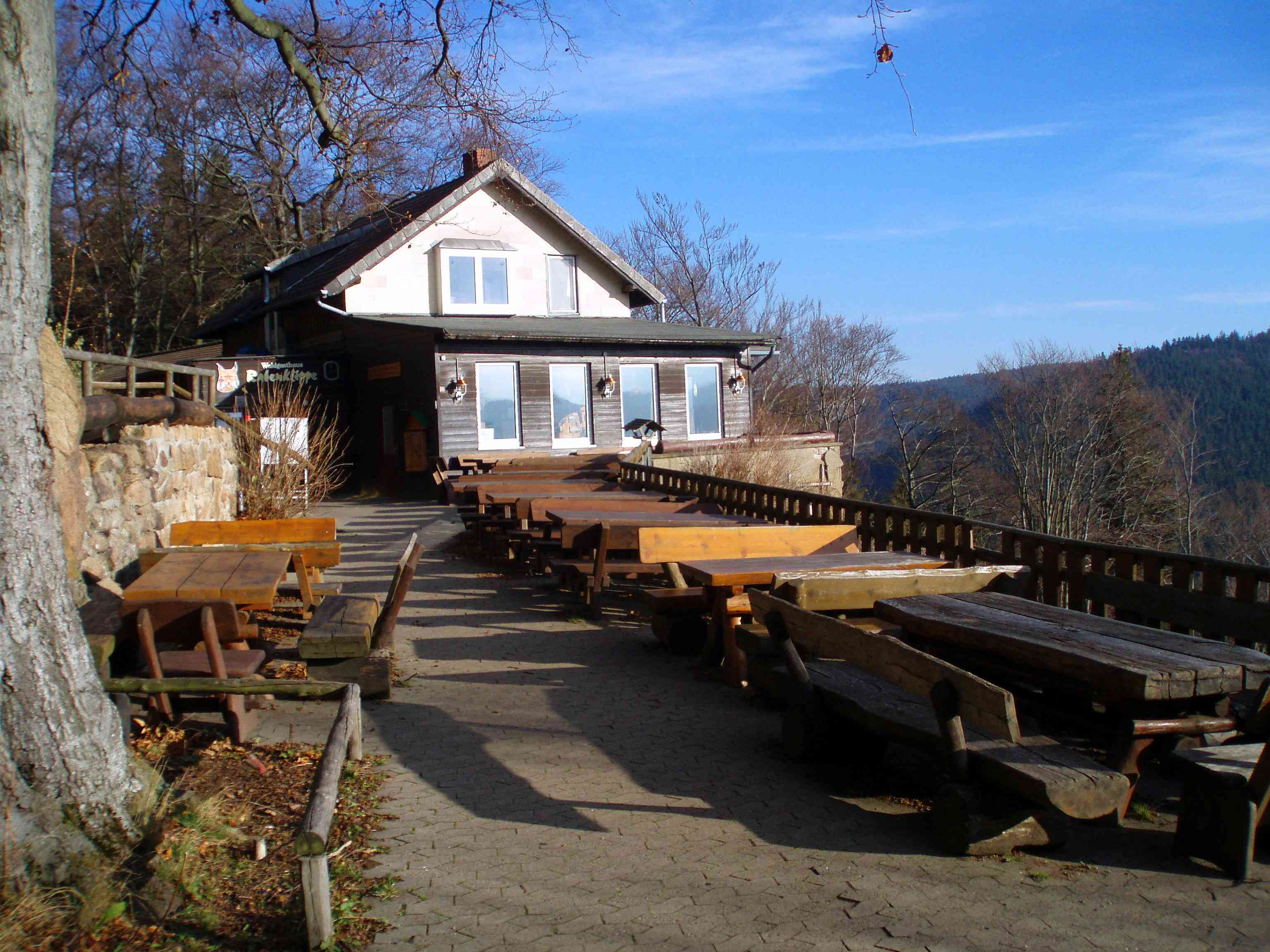
Rabenklippe Cafe

The Rabenklippe is a granite rock formation in the Harz National Park. The name means "Raven Crag" and is very apt as ravens live in the vicinity.

== Location ==
The Rabenklippe is located in the Harz mountains of Germany, southeast of Bad Harzburg, above the Ecker valley, a few hundred metres away from the border between Lower Saxony and Saxony-Anhalt. Part of the crag has been made accessible with steps and railings. In good weather there is an excellent view of the Brocken, the highest mountain in the Harz.

There are crags by the Rappbode Reservoir called the Große Rabenklippe and Kleine Rabenklippe.

== History ==
The Rabenklippe became a popular walking destination in the 19th century. Immediately next to the crag a refuge hut was erected in 1874, the predecessor to today's forest tavern.

In the immediate vicinity of the cafe and the crag is the lynx enclosure built by the Harz National Park authority (see Harz National Park).

== Hiking ==
The Rabenklippe is on a hiking trail that can be accessed from Bad Harzburg via the Burgberg Cable Car. There is a checkpoint at the restaurant which is no. 170 in the Harzer Wandernadel system.

== See also ==
- Harzklippen - other rock formations in the Harz.
