= Butterberg (Ilsenburg) =

Hill in Germany

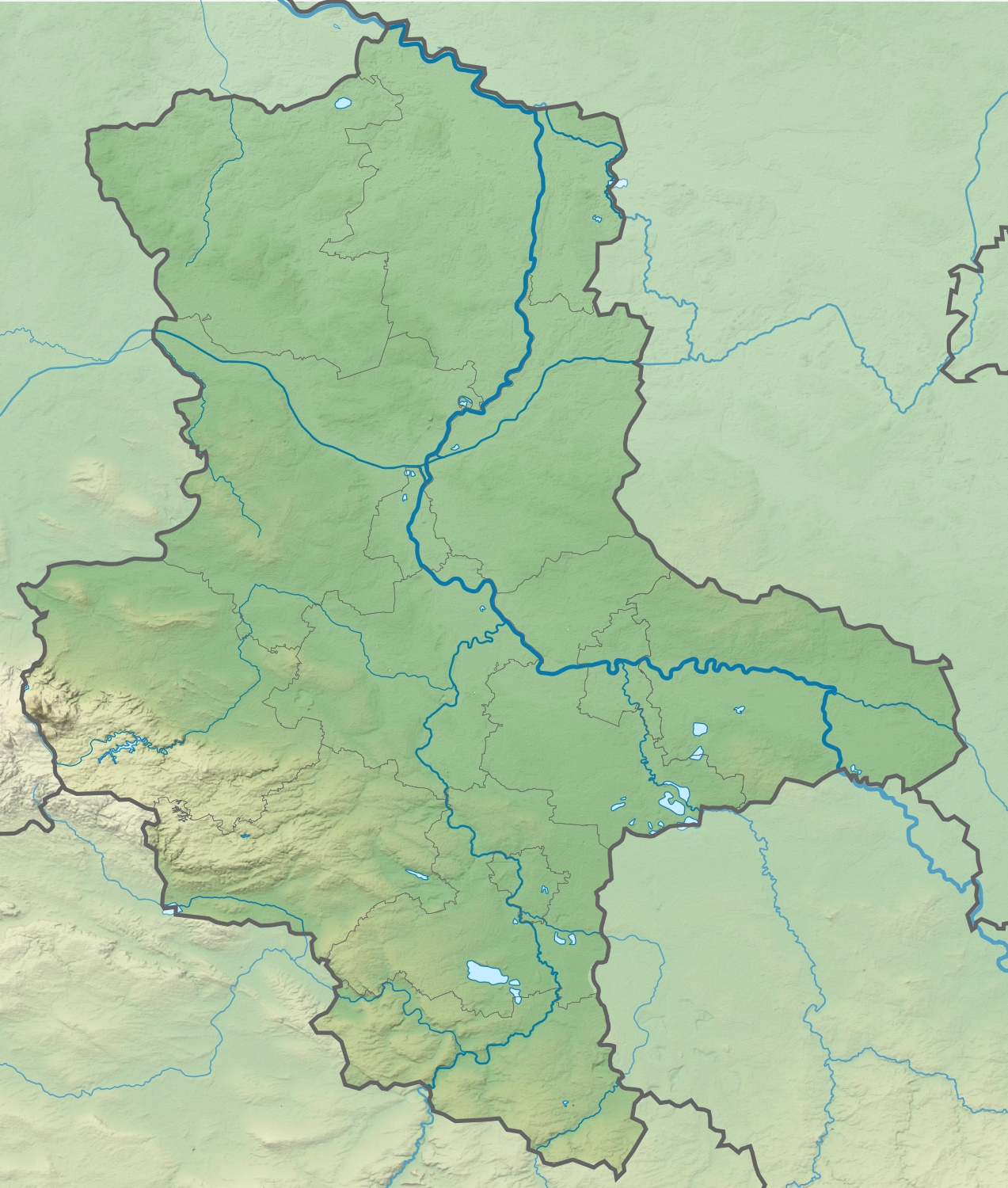
- Location within Saxony-Anhalt

Highest point
- Elevation: 280 m above sea level (NN) (920 ft)
- Coordinates: 51°51′42″N 10°41′56″E

Geography
- Location: Harz county, Saxony-Anhalt, Germany
- Parent range: Harz

The Butterberg is a hill, about 280 m above sea level (NN) high, in the county of Harz in the German state of Saxony-Anhalt.

== Location ==
The Butterberg lies about halfway between Ilsenburg to the west-northwest and Drübeck to the east-southeast. To the northeast the countryside transitions into the Wahrberg (274.9 m above NN), to the west it descends to the valley of the Ilse and, to the east, into that of the Nonnenbach. The hill drops more steeply on its southern side than on its northern flanks. To the south, the state road, the Landesstraße 85 runs from east to west and, to the north on the other side of the Danstedt to Vienenburg railway, is the Bundesstraße 6 federal highway.

== Lookout mountain ==
From the Butterberg the Harz Foreland and ridges of the Harz Mountains may be seen. The view of Ilsenburg is almost completely obscured by the nearby copse of Eichholz. There is, however, a view of Drübeck.

== Height ==
The Butterberg is somewhat higher than 280 m. Northeast of its summit is a track with a spot height of 279.1 m above NN.

== Other hills with the name ==
There are many other hills called Butterberg in German-speaking areas.
