= Butterberg (Bad Harzburg) =

Hill in Germany

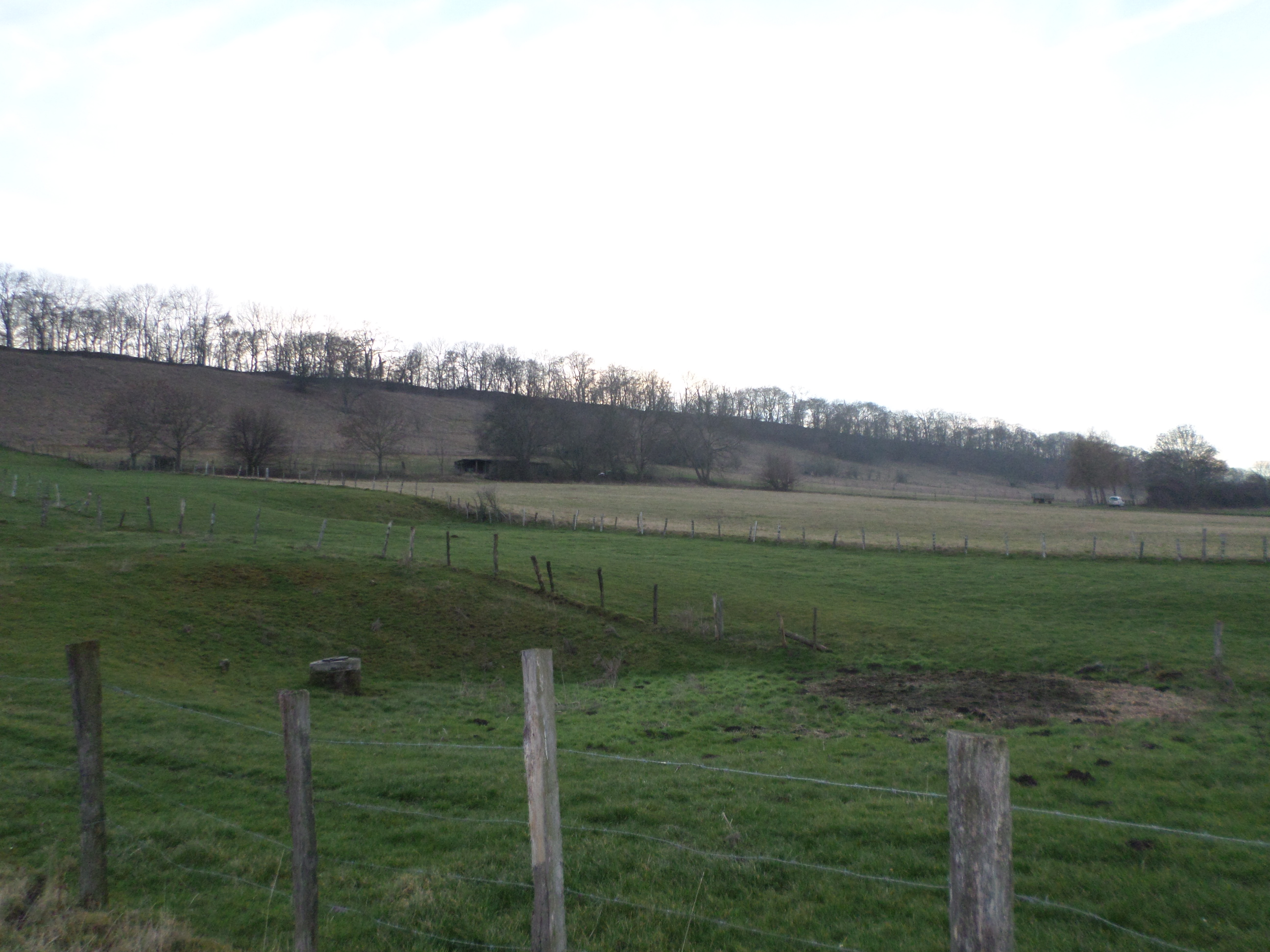
- View from north

Highest point
- Elevation: 308 m above sea level (NN) (1,010 ft)
- Coordinates: 51°53′14″N 10°34′21″E

Geography
- Location within Lower Saxony
- Location: Lower Saxony, Germany
- Parent range: Harz foothills

The Butterberg is an elongated hill northeast of the spa town of Bad Harzburg in Goslar district, in the German state of Lower Saxony. Its long crest, which since 1952 is protected as a nature reserve, reaches a height of 308 m above NN.

Part of the northern Harz foothills, the hill is located north of the Harz Nature Park at the rim of the Harz National Park. The Butterberg is part of the Harz - Brunswick Land - Eastphalia National Geopark; its steeply inclined strata belong to the Northern Harz Boundary Fault. In the west, the hill is bounded by the Radau river and the parallel Bundesstraße 4 highway. The mountain-ridge path offers scenic views to the Harz mountains and over the North German Plain.

The name Butter is associated with Low German buten (i.e. "outside", cf. Buten and binnen). These are therefore hills lying outside or on the edge of given places. There are many other "Butterberg" hills in German-speaking regions.

== See also ==
- List of mountains and hills in Lower Saxony
- List of mountains in the Harz
