= Oliver Krauß =

German politician (born 1969)

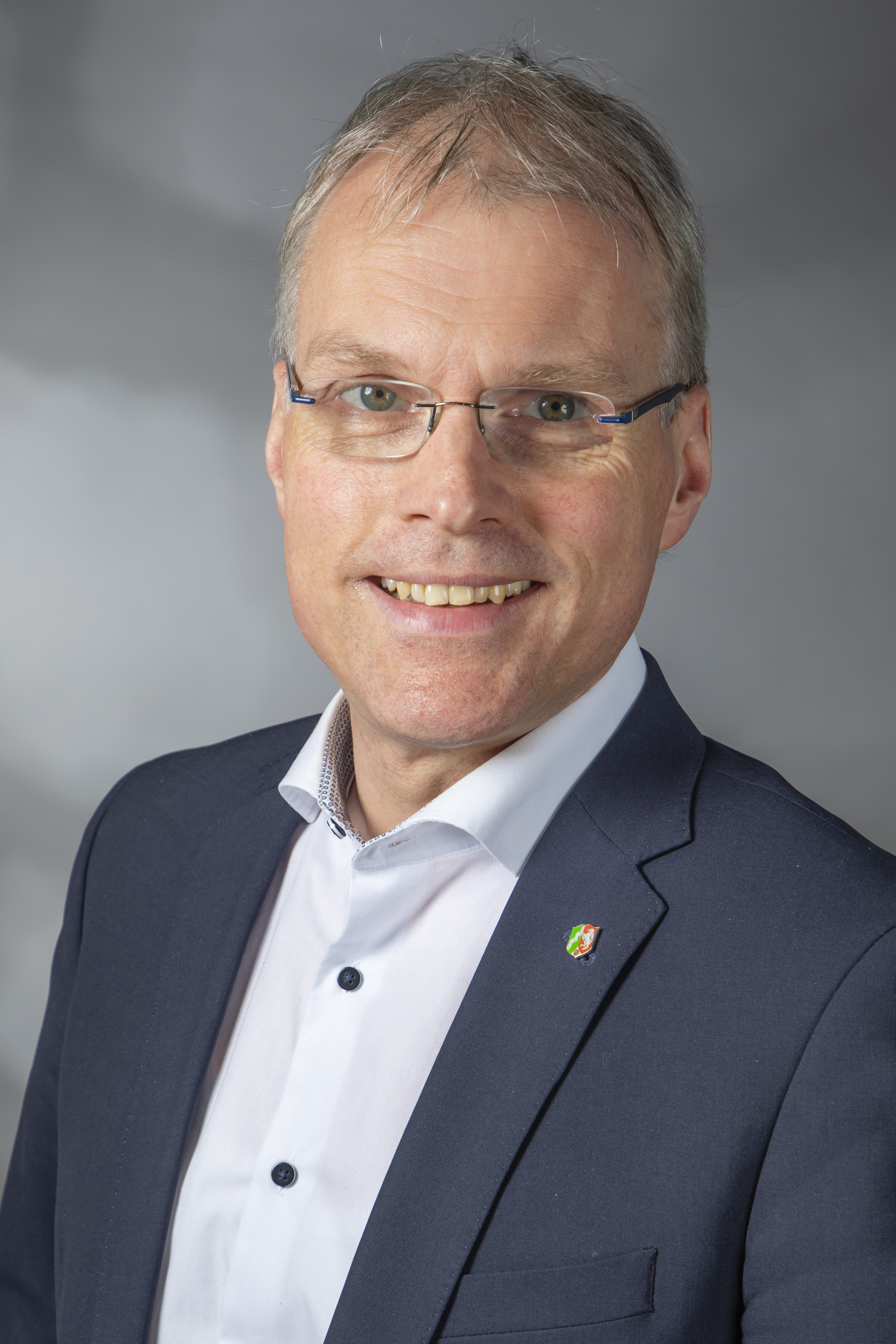
- Krauß in 2019

Member of the Landtag of North Rhine-Westphalia
- Incumbent
- Assumed office 1 June 2017
- Preceded by: Ilka von Boeselager
- Constituency: Rhein-Sieg-Kreis III – Euskirchen III

Personal details
- Born: 30 December 1969 (age 56) Bad Harzburg
- Party: Christian Democratic Union (since 1987)

Oliver Krauß (born 30 December 1969 in Bad Harzburg) is a German politician serving as a member of the Landtag of North Rhine-Westphalia since 2017. He has served as chairman of the Christian Democratic Union in the Rhein-Sieg-Kreis since 2021.
