= Molkenhaus (Bad Harzburg) =

Coordinates: 51°51′16″N 10°34′22″E

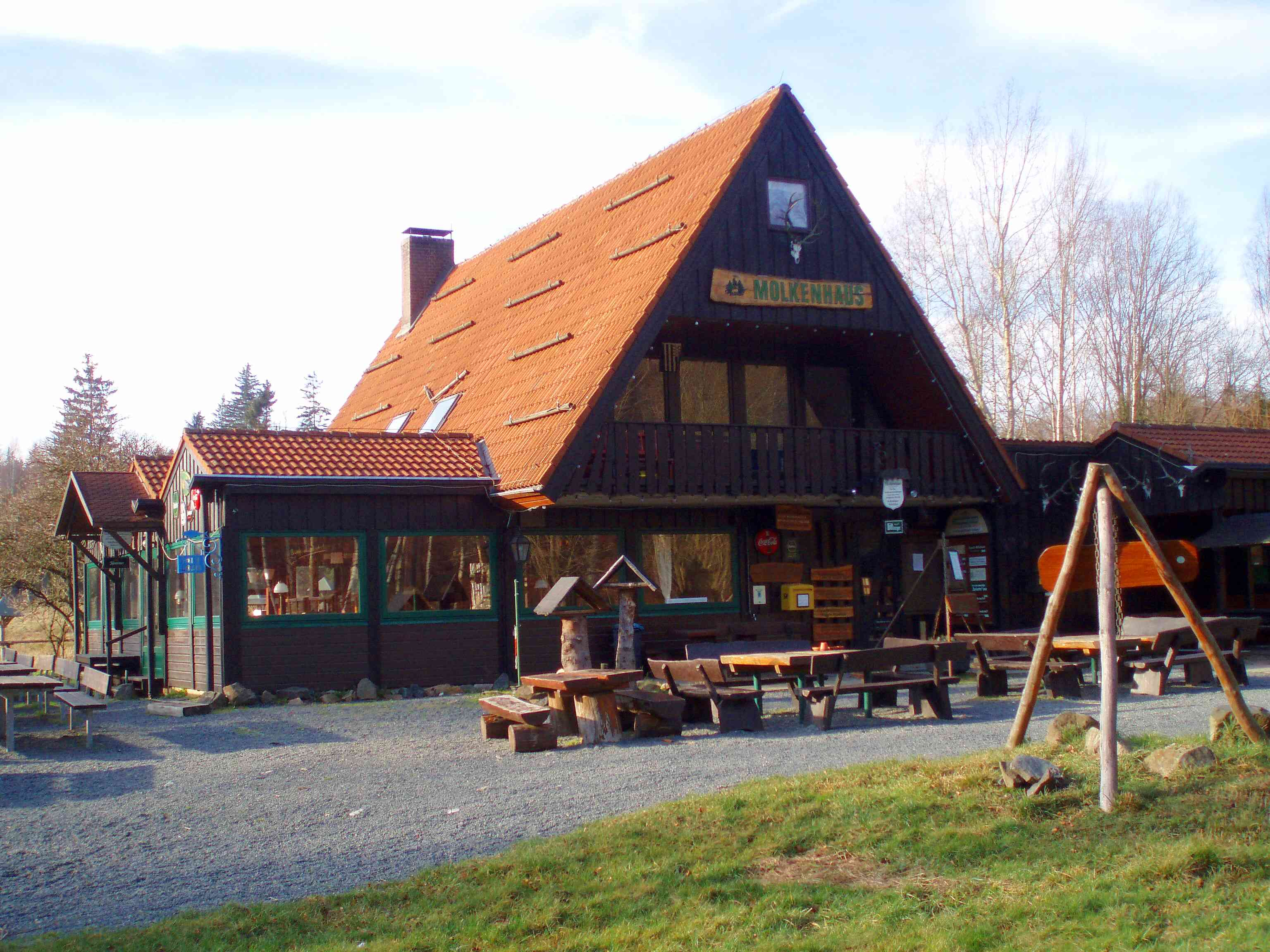
The Molkenhaus (2006)

The Molkenhaus near Bad Harzburg is a wooden house built in 1822, where cattle from the hillside pastures used to be milked without having to be driven miles to the surrounding farms. The house was owned by the manor (Domäne or Rittergut) of Bündheim-Bad Harzburg and, today, has been extended into a popular restaurant for day trippers and hikers. The property lies on the shores of the Hasselteich pond, about 3 km (1.9 mi) south of Bad Harzburg, east of the Rudolfklippe crags on a valley water meadow.

Its predecessor was built in 1665 by the Amtmann, Johann Heinrich von Uslar, on the eastern slopes of the Seilenberg hill.

The house is checkpoint no. 169 in the Harzer Wandernadel hiking trail network.
