= Großer Burgberg =

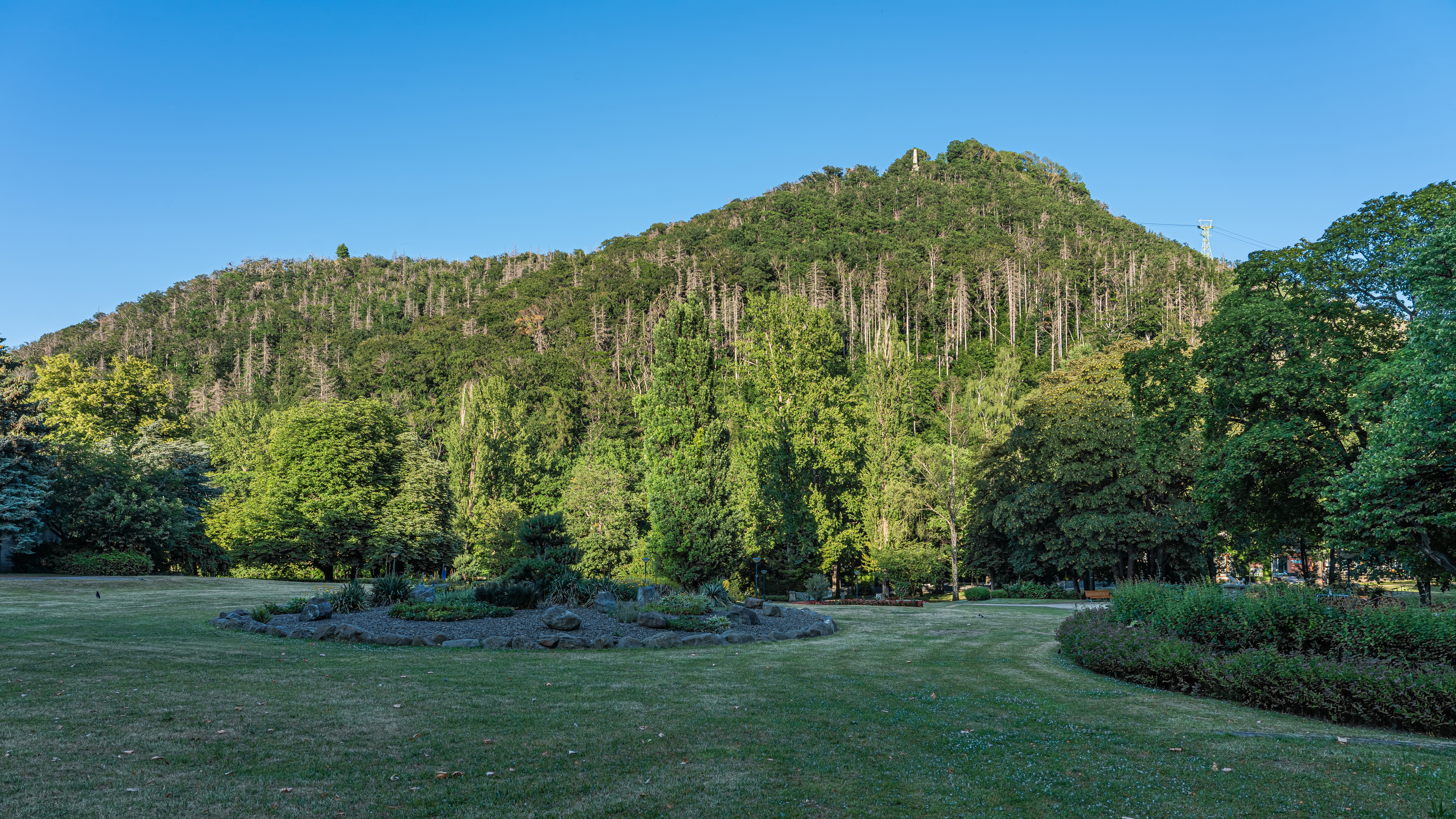

Highest point
- Elevation: 483 m (1,585 ft)
- Listing: Mountains of the Harz; Mountains and hills of Lower Saxony
- Coordinates: 51°52′18″N 10°34′2″E

Geography
- Location within Lower Saxony
- Location: Lower Saxony, Germany
- Parent range: Harz

The Großer Burgberg is a ca. 483 m (1,585 ft) high hill on the northern rim of the Harz mountains range, right on the edge of Bad Harzburg in Lower Saxony.

== Geography ==
It is situated east of the valley of the Radau River, where it leaves the Harz range and flows through the northern foothills towards its confluence with the Oker. The southern outskirts of Bad Harzburg reach up to the foot of the forested slopes.

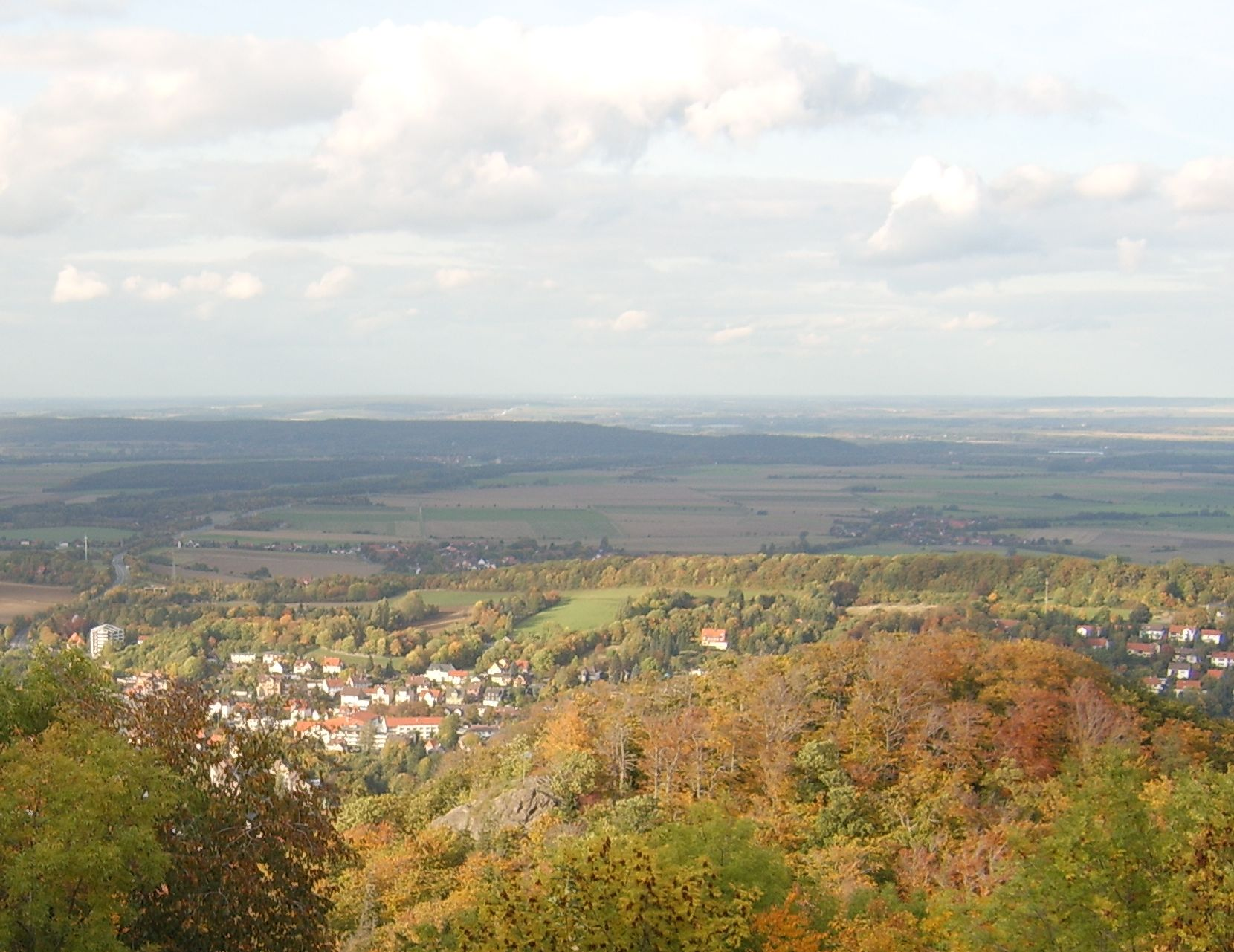
View over Kleiner Burgberg and the Northern Lowland

North of the Großer Burgberg summit is the Kleiner Burgberg spur at 436.5 m (1,432 ft). Both peaks offer sweeping views over the town and the Northern Lowland. On the Burgberg plateau are foundations of medieval Harzburg Castle and the Canossa Column at 482.8 m (1,584 ft), erected in 1877 in the honour of Chancellor Otto von Bismarck.

Since 1929 the Burgberg Cable Car runs up to the summit from the Radau River and the B 4 federal road.
