= Butterberg (Bischofswerda) =

Mountain in Germany

Coordinates: 51°09′21″N 14°11′03″E

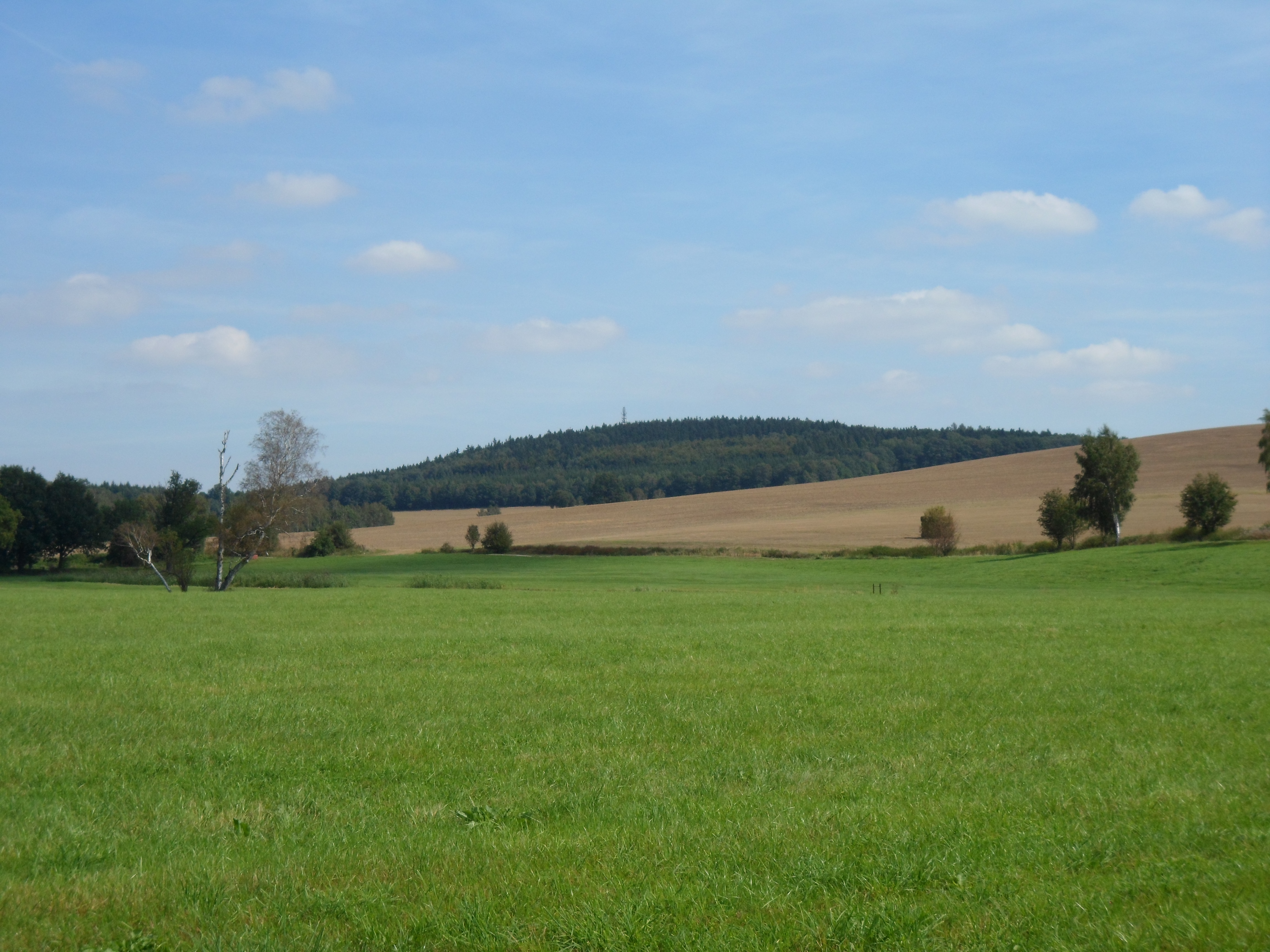
- View of Butterberg mountain near Bischofswerda

Highest point
- Elevation: 385 m (1,263 ft)

Geography
- Location: Saxony, Germany

Butterberg is a mountain of Saxony, southeastern Germany.
