= Radau =

River in Germany

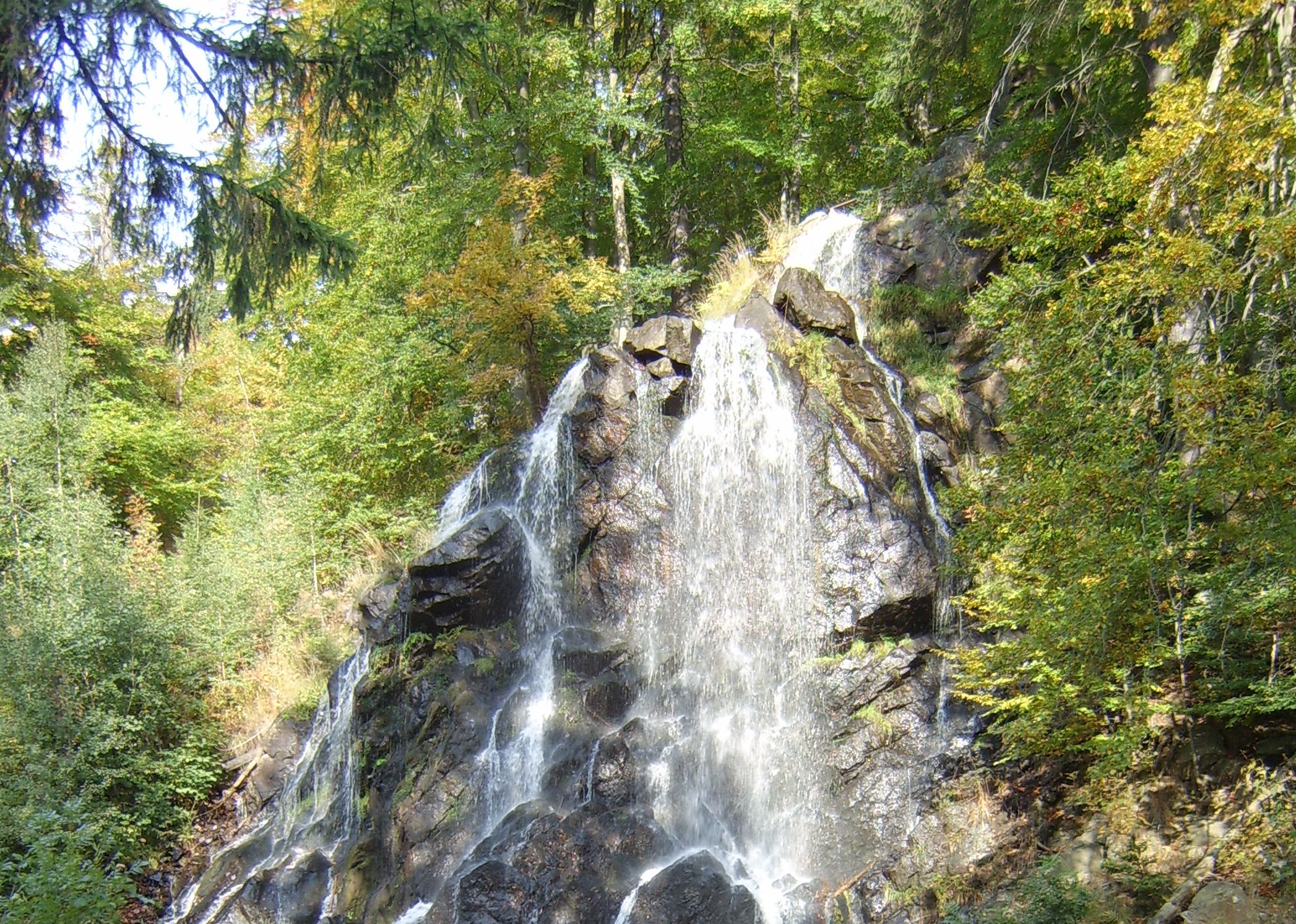
- Radau Waterfall

Location
- Country: Germany
- State: Lower Saxony
- Reference no.: 48218

Physical characteristics
- Source
  - location: Torfhausmoor east of Torfhaus
  - coordinates: 51°47′56″N 10°32′27″E
  - elevation: 800 m above sea level (NN) m
- Mouth
  - location: northeast of Vienenburg into the Oker
  - coordinates: 51°57′29″N 10°34′25″E
- Length: 21.1 km (13.1 mi)
- Basin size: 58.7 km^{2} (22.7 sq mi)
- Discharge
  - location
  - average: 0.790 m^{3}/s (27.9 cu ft/s)

Basin features
- Progression: Oker→ Aller→ Weser→ North Sea
- Navigable: No

Radau is a river of Lower Saxony, Germany. It is right tributary of the Oker. It rises in the Harz range, leaves the mountains at Bad Harzburg, and discharges into the Oker near Vienenburg.

== Course ==
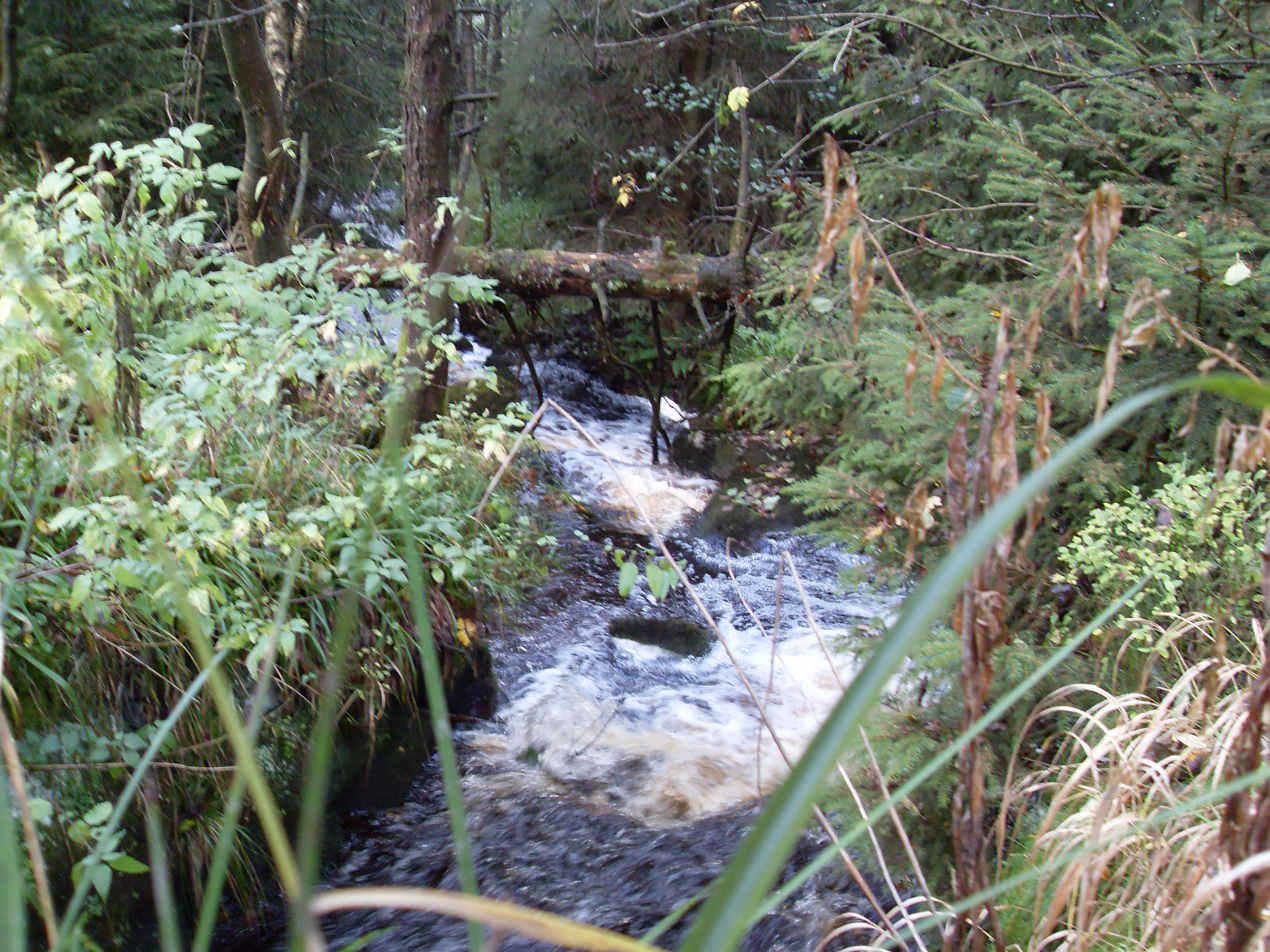
The Radau about 100 metres in height above Torfhaus

The river rises at around 800 m (2,600 ft) in the Upper Harz region, in a bog known as Torfhausmoor or Radaubornmoor. The raised bog stretches from Torfhaus, a hamlet belonging to the Clausthal-Zellerfeld municipality, to the Brocken massif in the east. The historic peat cutting area today is part of the Harz National Park and can be reached via the scenic trail Goethe Way.

From its source, the mountain stream flows northwards through the Radau valley that it has carved out and feeds the 23 m (75 ft) high waterfall Radauwasserfall south of Bad Harzburg, immediately next to the Bundesstraße 4 federal highway. The artificial waterfall was constructed as a tourist attraction in 1859 on behalf of the Duchy of Brunswick State Railway company, which had operated the Brunswick–Bad Harzburg railway line since 1841. Beneath the waterfall is a restaurant and a miniature railway integrated into the landscape.

Passing west of the Großer Burgberg mountain, the river flows through the Bad Harzburg and Vienenburg urban areas. The Radau discharges into the Oker river northeast of Vienenburg, near the village of Wiedelah at the eastern rim of the Harly Forest.

== Water management ==
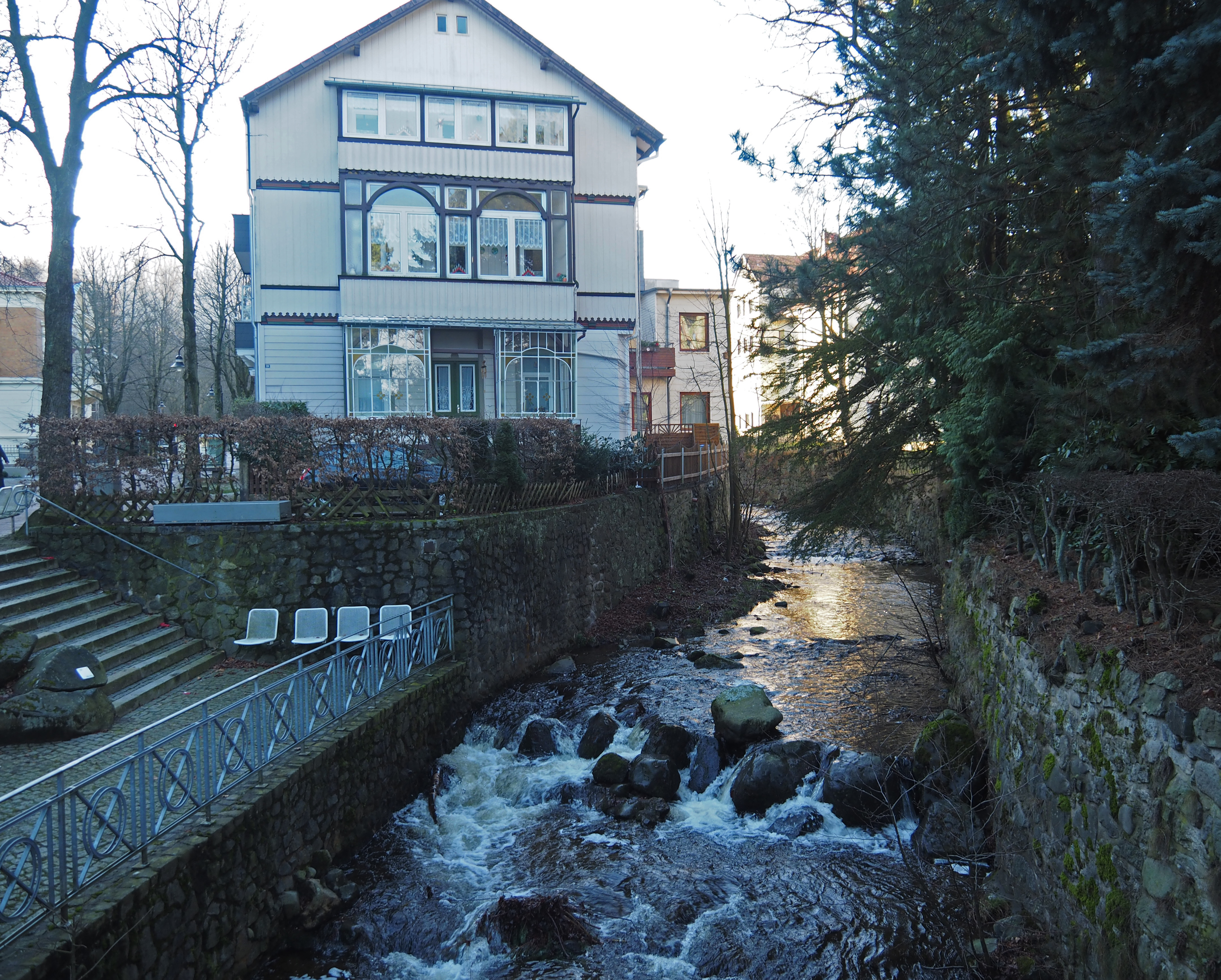
Radau in Bad Harzburg

Since 1981, shares of the Radau waters are discharged to the Oker Dam and the Romkerhall hydroelectric plant run by the Harzwasserwerke company, as well as for drinking water treatment at the Grane Dam. While the upper current is almost left in its natural state, the lower sections are more obstructed; recently, fish ladders have been built to facilitate natural migration.

== History ==
In the Middle Ages the Radowe was used for the rafting of logs and wooden palettes stacked with peat. To that end the river was dammed by 6 raft locks. The goods to be rafted, that had previously been dropped in the river, were transported downstream with the additional weight of water.

== Remarks on pronunciation ==
- Radau (river): stress on the first syllable
- Radau (German for noise, din, cf. "row"): stress on the last syllable

== See also ==
- List of rivers of Lower Saxony
