= Bad Harzburg =

Place in Lower Saxony, Germany

- Town
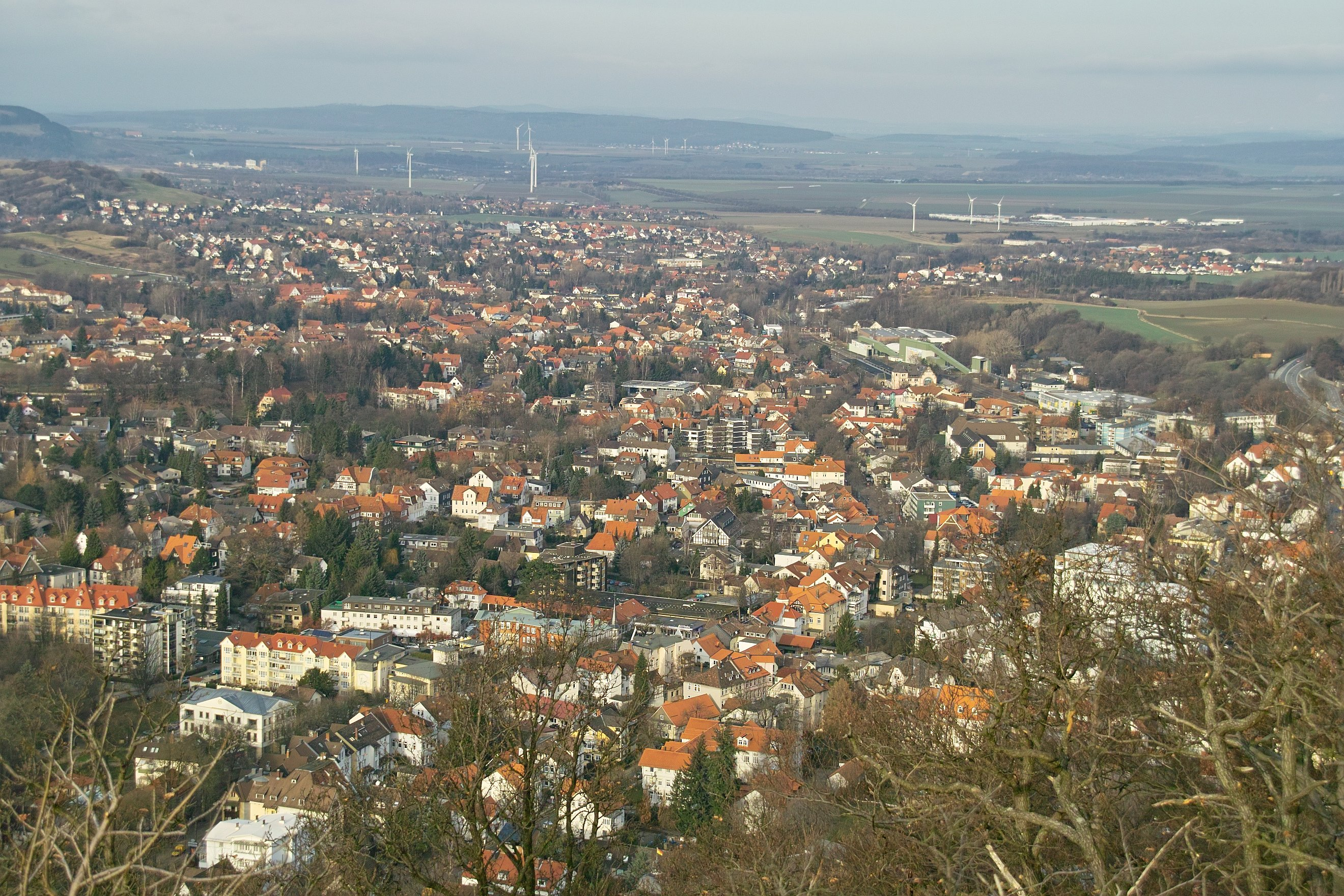
- View from the Burgberg

- Coat of arms

- Location of Bad Harzburg within Goslar district
- Interactive map of Bad Harzburg
- Location within Germany Location within Lower Saxony
- Coordinates: 51°52′52″N 10°33′44″E
- Country: Germany
- State: Lower Saxony
- District: Goslar
- Subdivisions: 8 districts

Government
  - Mayor (2019–24): Ralf Abrahms (Ind.)

Area
  - Total: 65.52 km^{2} (25.30 sq mi)
- Elevation: 261 m (856 ft)

Population (2025-12-31)
  - Total: 19,503
  - Density: 297.7/km^{2} (770.9/sq mi)
- Time zone: UTC+01:00 (CET)
  - Summer (DST): UTC+02:00 (CEST)
- Postal codes: 38667
- Dialling codes: 05322
- Vehicle registration: GS
- Website: www.stadt-bad-harzburg.de

Bad Harzburg (German pronunciation: [baːt ˈhaʁtsˌbʊʁk]; Eastphalian: Bad Harzborch) is a spa town in central Germany, in the Goslar district of Lower Saxony. It lies on the northern edge of the Harz mountains and is a recognised saltwater spa and climatic health resort.

== Geography ==
Bad Harzburg is situated at the northern foot of the Harz mountain range on the edge of the Harz National Park. To the east of the borough is the boundary between the states of Lower Saxony and Saxony-Anhalt, the former Inner German Border. The small Radau river, a tributary to the Oker, has its source in the Harz mountains and flows through the town. Nearby are the towns of Goslar to the west, Vienenburg to the north, Braunlage to the south and Ilsenburg and Osterwieck in the east.

Bad Harzburg is rich in natural resources such as gabbro, chalk, gravel, and oolithic iron ore (former Hansa Pit), all of which are or were mined in today's city's area.

Climatically Bad Harzburg is a transition zone to a pure alpine region with a pronounced local climate.

=== Town districts ===
The districts within the borough of Bad Harzburg, with their population in brackets, are:

- Bad Harzburg (9,205)
- Bettingerode (438)

- Altfeld
- Radau Estate (German: Gut Radau)

- Bündheim (5,238)
- Eckertal (153)
- Göttingerode (986)
- Harlingerode (3,068)
- Schlewecke (1,753)

- Radauanger

- Westerode (1,074)

- Mathildenhütte
- Quellesiedlung

Population: as at 30 June 2018

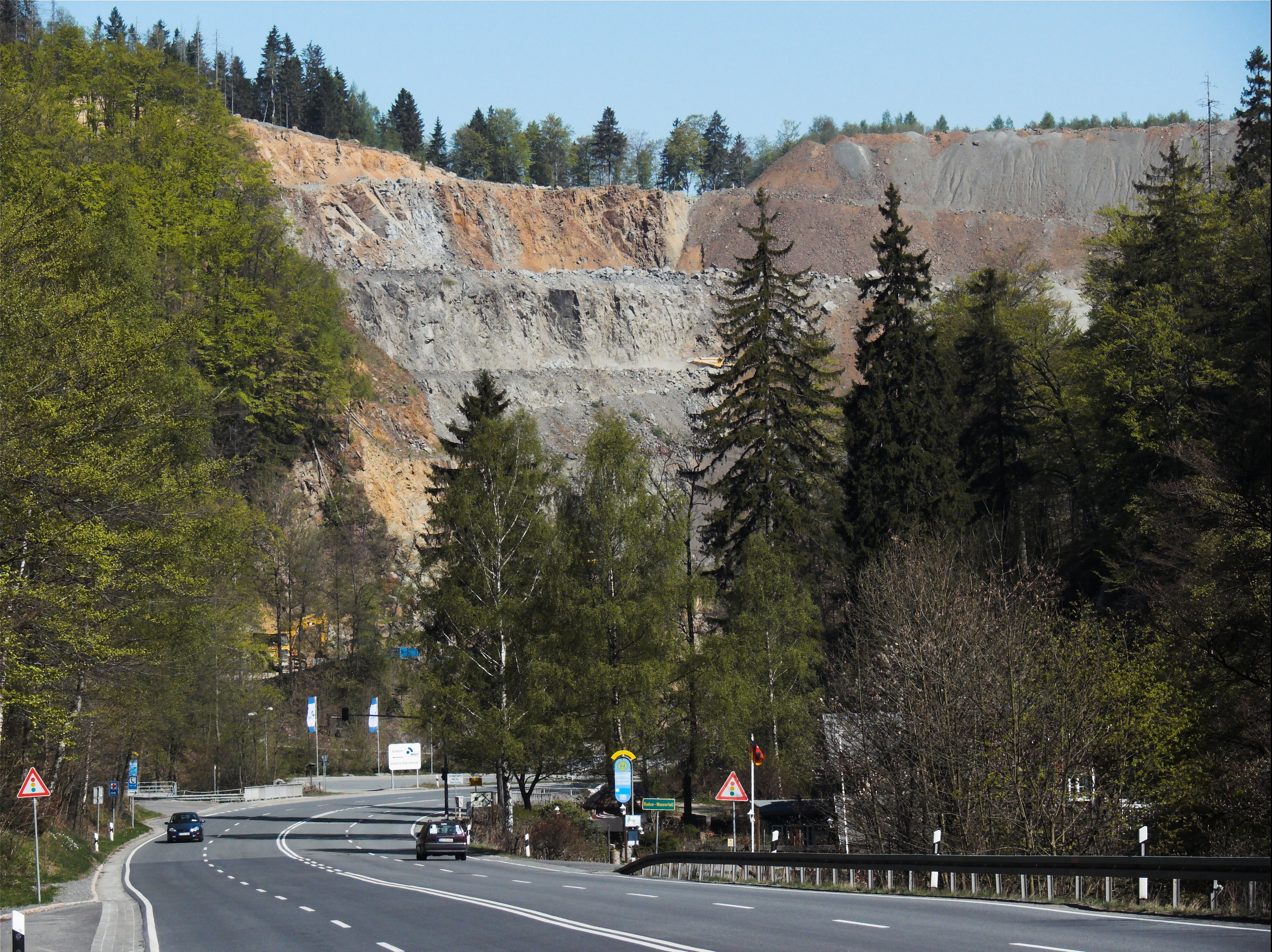
Gabbro quarry south of Bad Harzburg

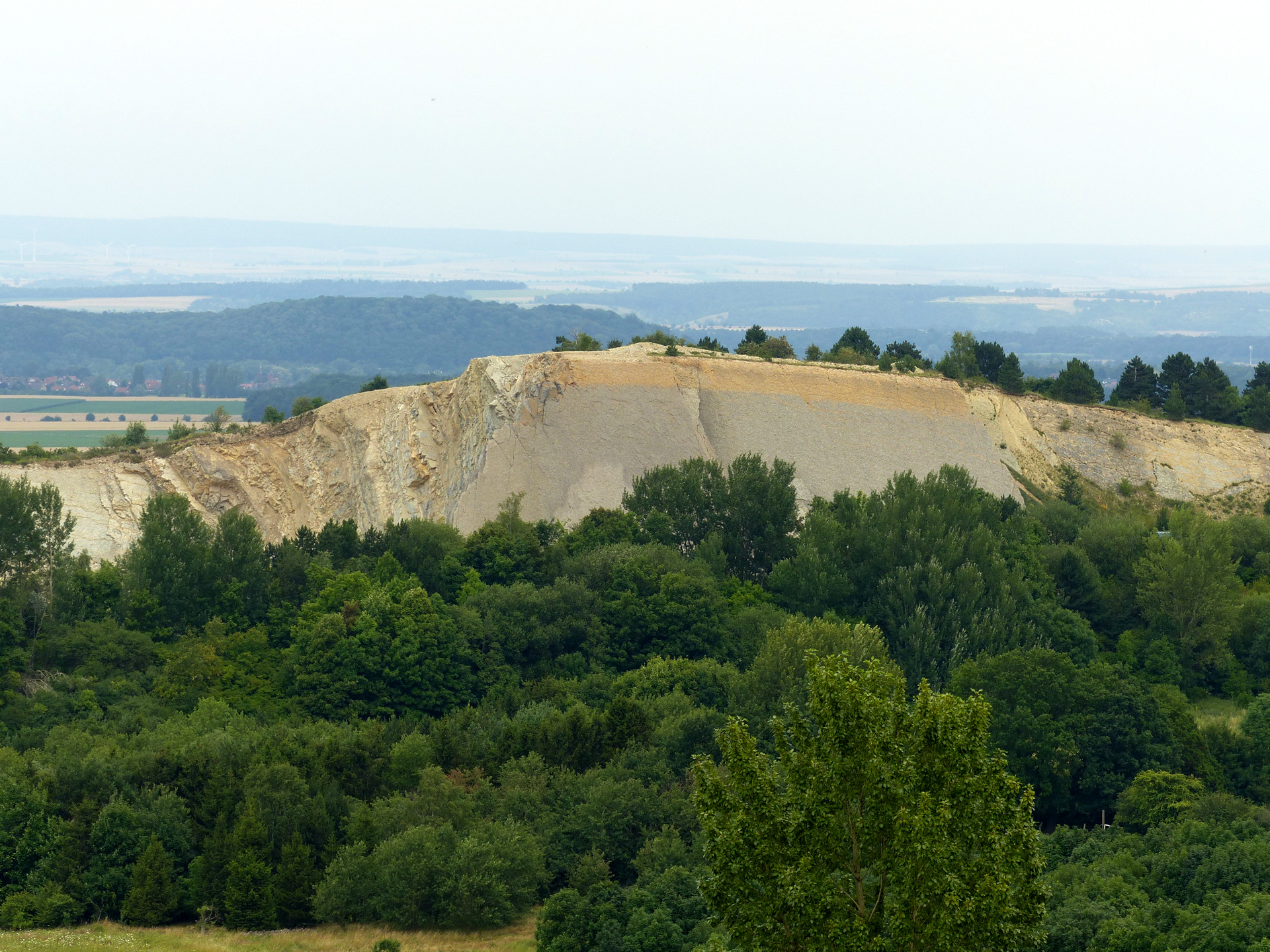
The former Langenberg chalk quarry near Göttingerode, uniquely presenting the Northern Harz Boundary Fault.

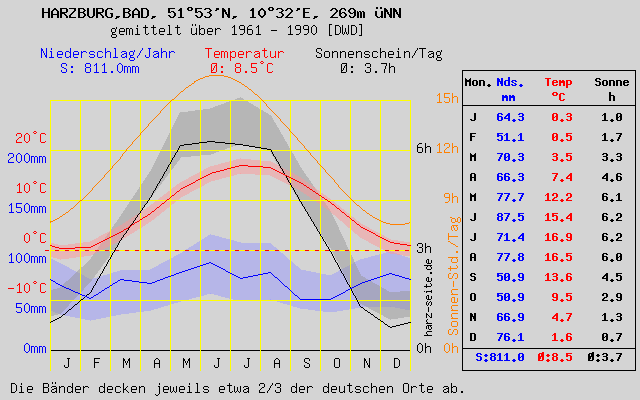
Climatic diagram for Bad Harzburg

== History ==
=== Medieval times ===
According to legend, about 780 AD the Emperor Charlemagne, after the conquest of the area in the course of the Saxon Wars, had a chapel built on the Burgberg a hill overlooking the town. It may have stood on the site of a sacred grove dedicated to a Saxon god named Krodo, whose statue Charlemagne had overthrown.

King Conrad I of Germany is believed to have established a college of canons here in 916, in order to strengthen his rule in the Duchy of Saxony under Henry the Fowler. King Henry III had it transferred to his Kaiserpfalz in Goslar in 1039. Still on bad terms with the Saxons, his son and successor Henry IV between 1065 and 1068 had a sizable castle, the Harzburg, built on the Burgberg to control the region, where he was besieged in 1073 by the forces of Duke Otto of Nordheim during the Great Saxon Revolt. Henry managed to escape from the castle, which after the Peace of Gerstungen was badly damaged by its attackers. Emperor Frederick Barbarossa had it rebuilt after he had defeated his rival, the Saxon duke Henry the Lion in 1180. Henry's son Otto IV, crowned Holy Roman Emperor in 1209, died at the castle on 19 May 1218.

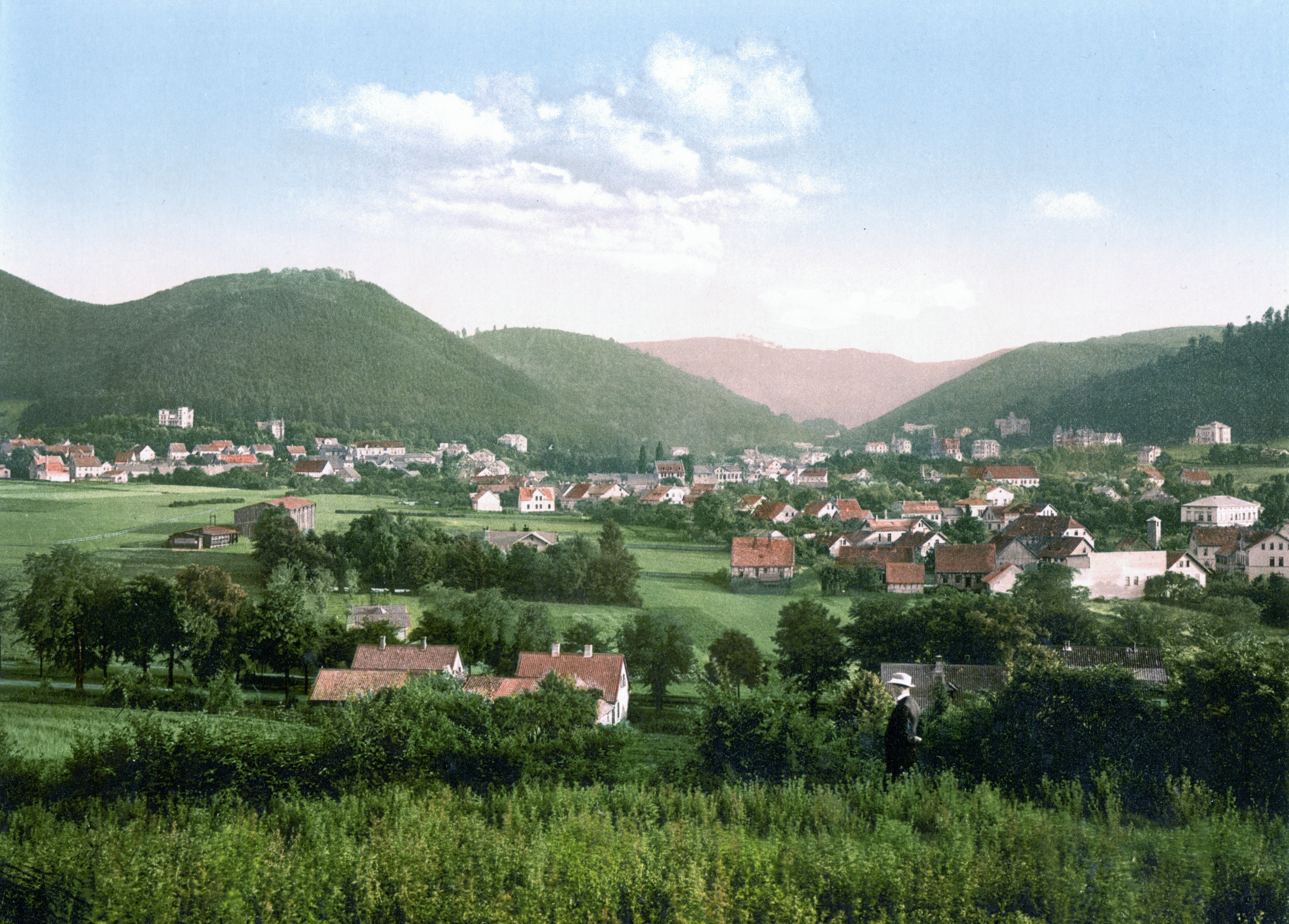
Bad Harzburg about 1900

Archaeological findings of a first, later abandoned, settlement beneath the castle called Schulenrode (Old Saxon for "hidden (cf. skulk) clearing") date back to the 10th century. Another locality nearby named Hartesborch was first mentioned in a 1314 deed by the Benedictine abbey of Ilsenburg. The present-day town itself, then called Neustadt ("new town"), was first documented in 1338.

=== Modern period ===
From 1488 on, the Harzburg with its surrounding estates was part of the Principality of Brunswick-Wolfenbüttel, though spatially separated from the residence of the prince at Wolfenbüttel by the neighbouring Prince-Bishoprics of Hildesheim and Halberstadt. About 1569, Duke Julius of Brunswick promoted the development of a saline water well to extract salt. The well was called Juliushall and since 1852 the brine has been used for saline baths as well as other medical purposes.

In 1892 the townspeople changed the town's name from Neustadt to Harzburg. It was given the title "Bad" (German for "bath", i. e. spa), received town privileges in 1894 and has since become an important spa town and tourist attraction.

=== 20th century ===
The election results for the Nazi Party in the Bad Harzburg district had been below-average so far. The Harzburg Front of a united "national opposition" against the German government of Heinrich Brüning was initiated by Alfred Hugenberg, the national-conservative German National People's Party (DNVP), the leadership of the Nazi Party (NSDAP), Der Stahlhelm first World War ex-servicemens' organisation and the Alldeutscher Verband pressure group and constituted on 11 October 1931. Both the People's and Nazi parties participated in the government of the Free State of Brunswick from 1930, with the leading Nazi politician Dietrich Klagges as Minister of the Interior from September 1931.

During World War II, military hospitals were established in several hotels. The town surrendered without a fight to the 83rd US Infantry Division on 11 April 1945.

After the war, Bad Harzburg with the lands of Brunswick belonged to the British zone of Allied-occupied Germany and from 1949 was part of West Germany. Before reunification, its railway station was the eastern terminus of a major railway route just west of the inner German border.

The modern community of Bad Harzburg was founded on July 1, 1972, as the communities of Bad Harzburg, Bettingerode, Bündheim-Schlewecke, Harlingerode, and Westerode were merged. The city was then incorporated from the Wolfenbüttel district into the Goslar district in 1974.

== Demographics ==
As of 30 June 2018 there were 21,917 inhabitants in Bad Harzburg.

Population statistics

Year	Inhabitants
1821	4,358
1848	4,679
1871	6,132
1885	7,630
1905	11,568
1925	14,164

Year	Inhabitants
1933	14,744
1939	16,686
1946	27,417
1950	29,901
1956	26,487

Year	Inhabitants
1961	25,946
1968	26,256
1970	25,334
1975	25,780
1980	24,924

Year	Inhabitants
1985	23,662
1990	23,882
1995	23,599
2000	23,100
2005	22,734
2010	21,891

== Sights ==
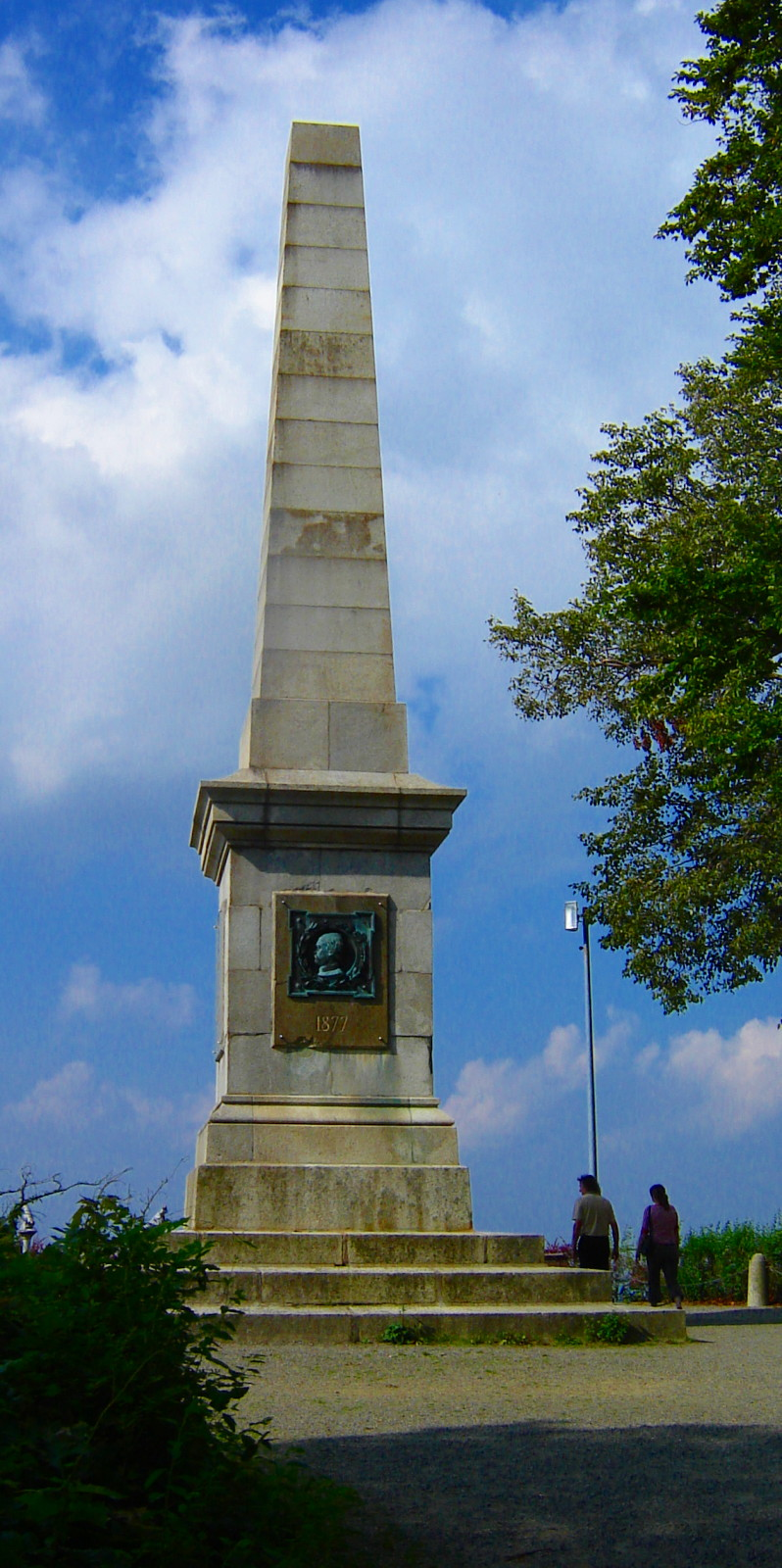
Canossasäule

- The Harzburg castle was finally slighted in 1650 by order of Duke Augustus the Younger, so that only its ruins remain today. A scenic overlook on its western perimeter offers a panoramic view of the North German Plain. This viewing point is dominated by the 19 m (62 ft) tall Canossa Column (Canossasäule) erected in 1877 in remembrance of both the Walk to Canossa by Emperor Henry IV in 1077 and a famous expression by Chancellor Otto von Bismarck during his Kulturkampf conflict with the Roman Catholic Church "We will not go to Canossa" ("Nach Canossa gehen wir nicht"). The Burgberg Cable Car has linked town and hilltop since 1929.
- Bündheim Castle (Bündheimer Schloss) was the seat of the Amtmann (bailiff or vogt) of the Duchy of Brunswick-Lüneburg. It was erected in 1685 under the rule of Duke Rudolph Augustus on the site of a former manor house, built in 1573, that had been destroyed during the Thirty Years' War. The castled replaced the Harzburg as the headquarters of the local government, it was constructed with stones of the slighted castle.
- Near Bündheim Castle are the stables of Bad Harzburg's stud farm, one of Europe's oldest, established in 1413 by the dukes of Brunswick-Lüneburg. The adjacent racecourse is the site of the annual Harzburg Race Week (Harzburger Rennwoche).
- The Pump Room (Wandelhalle) is the historic centre of the spa resort. Built in 1898 on the site of the former saline well, the hall today is used for recitals and lectures. On the other side of the Badepark stands the former bathhouse (Badehaus), which housed a casino (Spielbank) from 2000-2021. Now the former bathhouse is part of the adjoining Barbarossa-Klinik.
- The Lutheran parish church (Lutherkirche) of 1903 has paintings by Brunswick court painter, Adolf Quensen, and a Sauer pipe organ.
- East of Bad Harzburg stands the Cross of the German East (Kreuz des deutschen Ostens), an Ostlandkreuz, in remembrance of the expulsion of Germans from Eastern Europe after World War II. Erected in 2000 at an elevation of 555 m (1,821 ft) on the Uhlenklippen hill, the 18 m (59 ft) high cross replaces an earlier one from 1950, which was destroyed by a storm.
- The Sachsenbrunnen, a medieval spring in the nearby woods and source of drinking water for the castle of Harzburg.

== Culture ==
- The Harzburger Musiktage is a festival of classical music, dating back to 1970.

== Politics ==
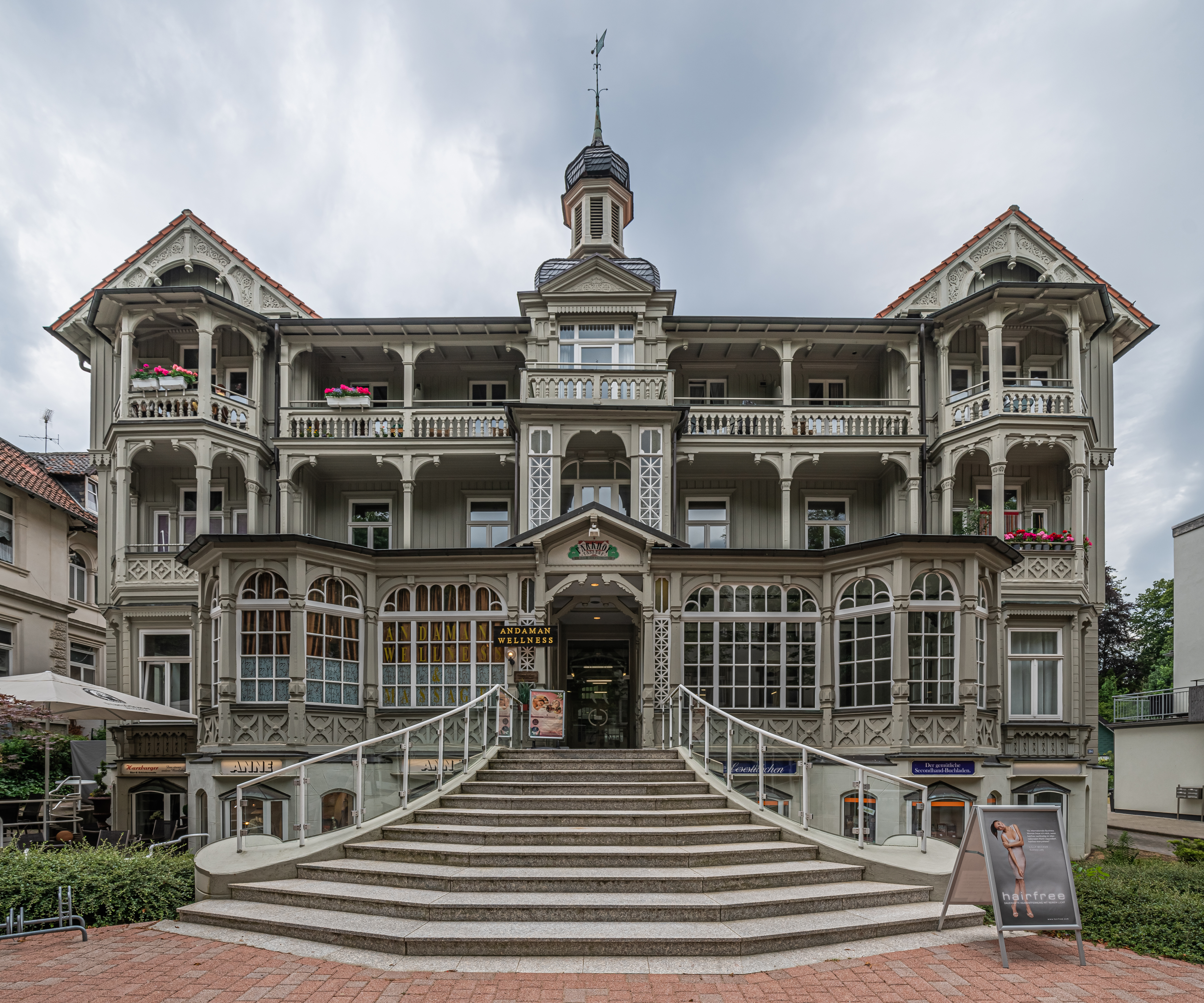
Timber-framed house in typical 19th century "fretsaw style"

=== Town council ===
2011 local elections:

- SPD: 12 seats (35.98%)
- CDU: 12 seats (34.4%)
- Green: 5 seats (14.25%)
- WTD: 3 seats (9,95%)
- FDP: 1 seat (2.96%)
- The Left: 1 seat (2.96%)

=== Mayors ===
Mayor (Bürgermeister) Ralf Abrahms (Greens) was elected in a two-round system on 22 September 2002 with 53.8% of the votes. Abrahms is the first Green mayor in Lower Saxony.

- 1947–1956: Hermann Nordmann (CDU)
- 1956–1961: Joachim Hinkel (FDP)
- 1961–1970: Fritz Schrader (CDU)
- 1970–1972: Friedrich Ehrhardt (CDU) (temporary)
- 1972–1977: Siegfried Hoffmann(SPD)
- 1977–1981: Klaus „Jockel“ Homann (SPD)
- 1981–1986: Jürgen Dorka (1934–2008), (CDU)
- 1986–2002: Klaus „Jockel“ Homann (SPD);

=== Twin towns ===
Bad Harzburg is twinned with:

- Wilhelmshaven, Germany, 1988
- Port-Louis, France, 1993 - 2023
- Szklarska Poręba, Poland
- Ilsenburg, Germany

== Transport ==
The Bundesstraße 4 federal highway runs through Bad Harzburg, connecting the town with the A 369 motorway to Brunswick and Halle in the north and with Nordhausen and Erfurt in the south. In the east–west direction the A 36 motorway leads to the A 14 motorway at Bernburg and the 6 federal highway to Hanover.

Rail services are provided at Bad Harzburg station by RegionalExpress and RegionalBahn trains of the Deutsche Bahn running to Hanover, Brunswick, Holzminden and Halle.

== Notable people ==
=== Honorary citizen ===
- 1895 Otto von Bismarck (1815–1898), Reichskanzler

=== People from Bad Harzburg ===
- Max Frey (1874–1944), painter, lived in Bad Harzburg from 1937 until his death on March 11, 1944
- Lars Fuchs (born 1982), football player
- Waldemar Koch (1880–1963), politician
- Oliver Krauß (born 1969), politician (CDU)
- Irina Kuhnt (born 1968), hockey player and Olympian
- Stefan Meissner (born 1973), football player
- Carl Peters (1856–1918), colonizer, lived in Bad Harzburg from 1914 until his death

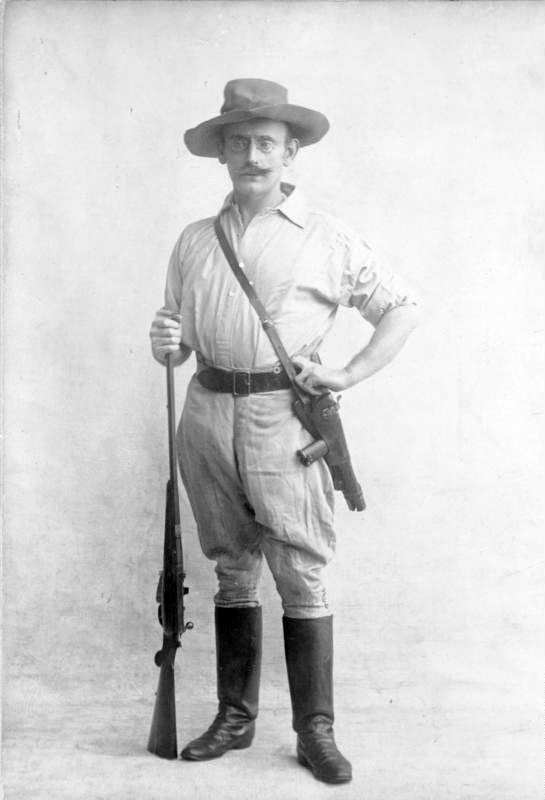
Carl Peters

- Manfred Schmidt (1913–1999), cartoonist
- Frithjof Schmidt (born 1953), politician
- Conrad Willgerodt (1841–1930), chemist
- Thomas Zacharias (born 1947), high jumper
