= Bundesautobahn 36 =

Federal motorway in Germany

A 36
- Bundesautobahn 36

Route information
- Length: 120.4 km (74.8 mi)
- Existed: 2019–present

Location
- Country: Germany
- States: Lower Saxony, Saxony-Anhalt

Highway system
- Roads in Germany; Autobahns; List; Federal; List; State; E-roads
← A 33	→ A 37

Bundesautobahn 36 (translates from German as Federal Motorway 36, short form Autobahn 36, abbreviated as BAB 36 or A 36) is an autobahn in Germany. It was established on 1 January 2019 from the Bundesautobahn 395 and parts of the Bundesstraße 6.

The highway is collectively known as Nordharzautobahn (North Harz highway) due to the route being parallel to the Harz mountains from Vienenburg to Bernburg.

== History ==
In March 1926, a route between Seesen and Halberstadt north of the Harz mountains was first suggested as part of a greater network in Germany. More detailed plannings of parts of today's route reach back to April 1953, when a planning office in Brunswick recommended a highway-like route between Braunschweig and Bad Harzburg; this route was built between 1972 and 1994 as A 395 and replaced the B 4 along its way. This part wasn't considered a part of A 26 until discussions about upgrading the highway-like Bundesstraße 6 between Vienenburg interchange (A 395) and Bernburg (Saale) interchange (A 14) emerged in 2017 and were officially realized on 1 January 2019, leading to the renaming of the A 395 (Braunschweig – Vienenburg) and B 6 (Vienenburg – Bernburg) to A 36.

The original planning of the A 36 considered a different route: In 1972, the highway was first named as A 106 and supposed to connect Bielefeld, Lage, Hamelin, Alfeld, Goslar, and Bad Harzburg to the Inner German border. If built, this route would today connect the A 2 with a hypothetical A 35 south of Hamelin in direction of Hanover, the A 7 (Hanover – Kassel), and the A 369 (Braunschweig – Braunlage), not including the former B 6 route to the A 14.

A second planning from 1976 designated the route from Bielefeld to Hamelin as a part of the A 35, leaving the highway from Hamelin to Bad Harzburg under the official name A 36. This last official plan was the base for the later renaming, considering the B 6 as the eastward continuation of the suggested highway. This plan was eventually abandoned in 1980, with only a minor route east of the A 2 (Ubbedissen, four-lane B 6) and west of the recent A 369 (Harlingerode, four-lane B 6) being realized for the purpose of being part of a major highway.

Map of the proposed 1976 highway

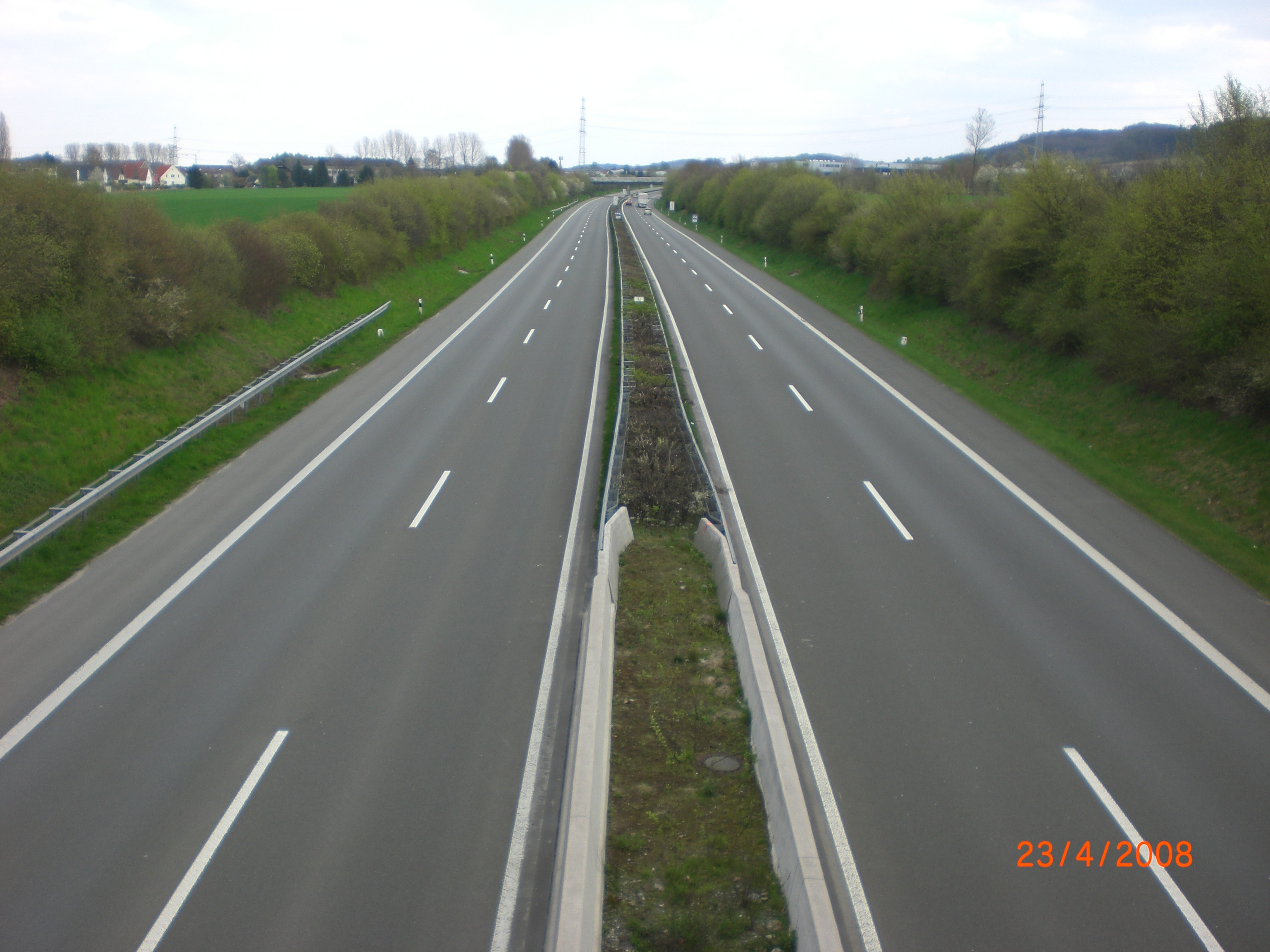
B 66 near Ubbedissen, part of the proposed A 106 from 1972 to 1976

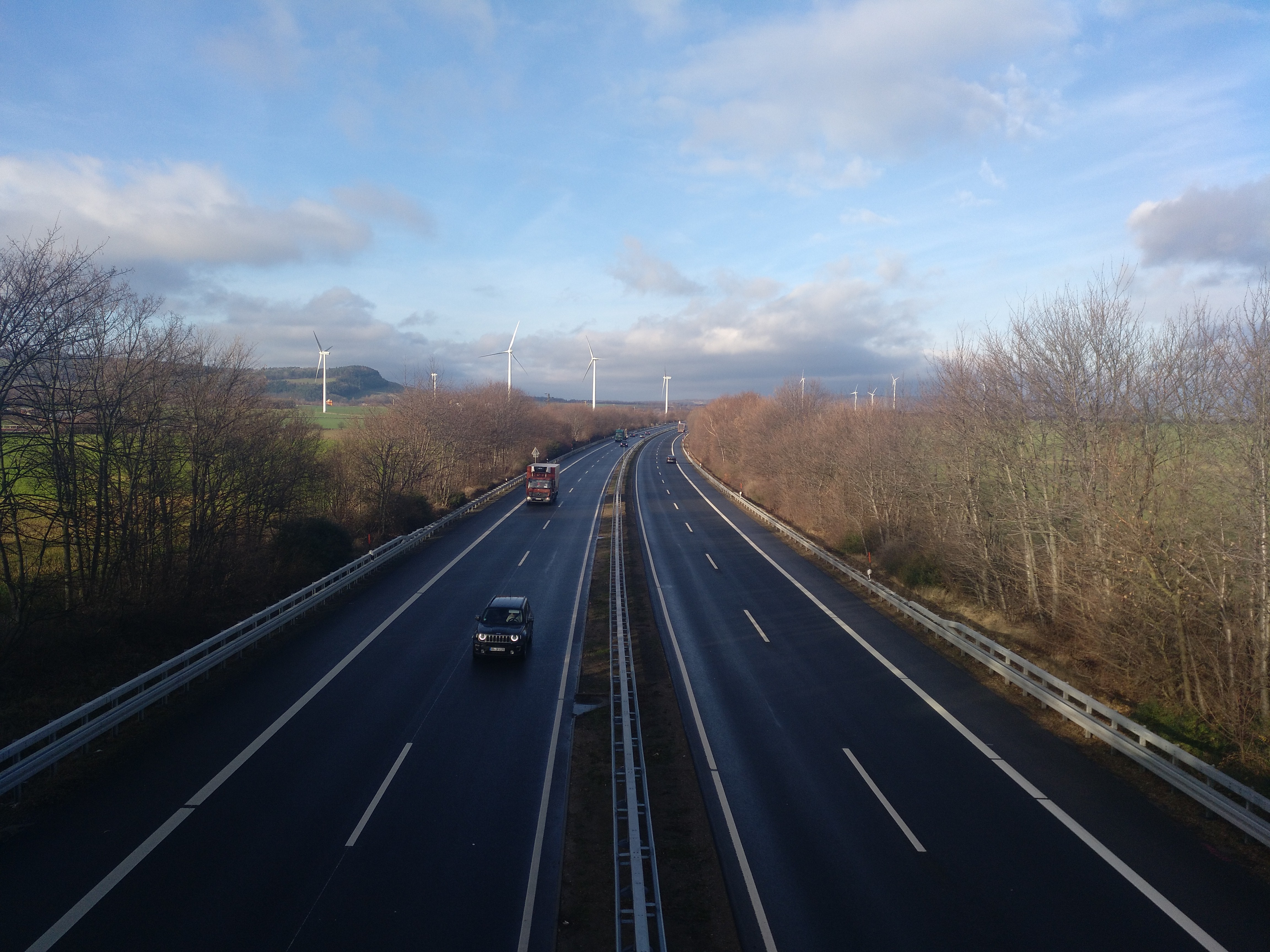
B 6 north of Harlingerode, part of the proposed A 36 from 1972 to 1980

== Exit list ==
(1)	Brunschweig-Süd 4-way interchange A 39 B 248
	Tankstelle
(-)	Braunschweig-Melverode
(2)	Braunschweig-Heldberg
(3)	Braunschweig-Stöckheim
(4)	Wolfenbüttel-Nord B 79
	Oker bridge 250 m
(5)	Wolfenbüttel-Nordwest
(6)	Wolfenbüttel-West
(7)	Wolfenbüttel-Süd
(8)	Flöthe
	Grünbrücke 10 m
	Straßenbrücke 70 m
	Rest area Werla
	Talbrücke Warnetal 130 m
	Rest area Ziegenberg
(9)	Schladen-Nord B 82
(10)	Schladen-Süd B 82
(11)	Lengde
	Oker bridge 200 m
(12)	Vienenburg B 241
	Bahn- und Straßenbrücke 150 m
(13)	Osterwieck/Vienenburg-Ost
(14)	Vienenburg 3-way interchange A 369
	Schamlah bridge
	Ecker bridge
(15)	Abbenrode
	Rest area Brockenblick
(16)	Stapelburg
	Ilse bridge 60 m
(17)	Ilsenburg/Veckenstedt
(18)	Wernigerode-Nord B 244
	Holtemme bridge
(19)	Wernigerode-Mitte
	Rest area Regensteinblick
(20)	Halberstadt/Heimburg B 81
(21)	Blankenburg-Mitte B 81
(22)	Blankenburg-Ost B 27
(23)	Thale
(24)	Quedlinburg-Mitte
	Bode bridge
(25)	Quedlinburg-Ost
	Selke bridge
(26)	Hoym
(27)	Aschersleben-West B 185
(28)	Aschersleben-Mitte B 180
	Rest area Hasenwinkel
(29)	Aschersleben-Ost
(30)	Güsten
(31)	Ilberstedt
(32)	Bernburg 4-way interchange A 14 B 6
