= Bundesautobahn 39 =

Federal motorway in Germany

A 39
- Bundesautobahn 39

Route information
- Length: 57 km (35 mi)

Major junctions
- From: Salzgitter
- To: Wolfsburg

Location
- Country: Germany
- States: Lower Saxony

Highway system
- Roads in Germany; Autobahns; List; Federal; List; State; E-roads
← A 38	→ A 40

Bundesautobahn 39 (translates from German as Federal Motorway 39, short form Autobahn 39, abbreviated as BAB 39 or A 39) is an autobahn in northern Germany. It currently connects the cities of Salzgitter, Braunschweig and Wolfsburg, with a planned extension to Lüneburg.

The A 39 begins north of Wolfsburg and ends at the A 7 close to Salzgitter. It crosses the A 2 south of Wolfsburg close to Königslutter.

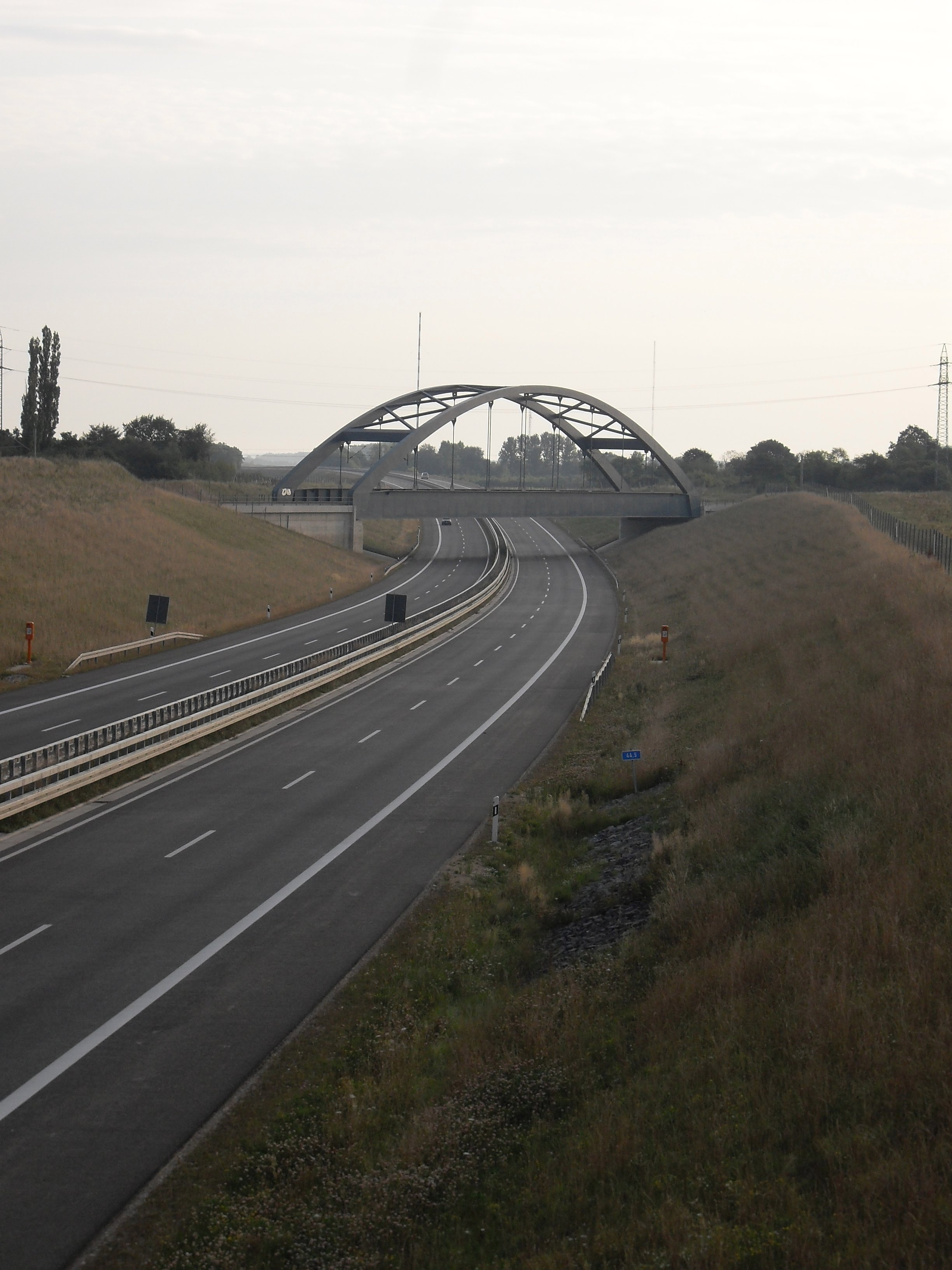
Railway bridge on the A 39 close to the village of Schandelah

== Exit list ==
	(1)	Maschener Kreuz 4-way interchange A 7
	(1)	Maschener Kreuz 4-way interchange A 1
	(2)	Maschen B 4
	(3)	Winsen-West
		Rest area
		Rest area
	(4)	Winsen-Ost
		Rest area Roddau
		Rest area Busschewald
	(5)	Handorf B 404
Intersection		3-way interchange Handorf (planned) A 21
	(6)	Lüneburg-Nord B 4 Under construction
		Lüneburg-Adendorf (planned) B 209
		Lüneburg-Moorfeld (planned)
		Lüneburg-Bleckeder Landstrasse (planned)
		Lüneburg-Neu Hagen (planned) B 209
		Lüneburg-Hafen (planned) B 216
		(planned)
		(planned)
		Rest area (planned)
		Altenmedingen (planned)
		Bad Bevensen (planned) B 191
		(planned)
		Uelzen-Hanstedt II (planned) B 71
		(planned)
		Soltendieck (planned)
		Bad Bodenteich (planned) B 190n
		Rest area (planned)
		Wittingen-West (planned) B 244
		Wittingen-Süd (planned)
		(planned)
		Ehra-Lessien (planned)
		(planned)
	(1)	Weyhausen B 248 B 188
		Allerbrücke
	(2)	Wolfsburg-Sandkamp
		Mittellandkanalbrücke
	(3)	Wolfsburg-Autostadt/VW-Werk
	(4)	Wolfsburg-Fallersleben
	(5)	Wolfsburg-Mörse
	(6)	Flechtorf B 248
	(7)	Wolfsburg/Königslutter 4-way interchange A 2
	(8)	Scheppau
	(9)	Cremlingen
	(10)	Sickte B 1
	(11)	Braunschweig-Rautheim
		Tunnel Lindenbergtunnel
	(12)	Braunschweig-Südstadt
		Tunnel Heidbergtunnel
	(13)	Braunschweig-Süd 4-way interchange A 395/ B 4
		Okerbrücke
	(14)	Braunschweig-Südwest 3-way interchange A 391
	(15)	Braunschweig-Rüningen B 248
		Tankstelle Rüningen
	(16)	Salzgitter-Thiede
		Brücke Stichkanal Salzgitter
	(17)	Salzgitter-Lebenstedt-Nord
	(18)	Salzgitter-Watenstedt
	(19)	Salzgitter-Lebenstedt-Süd
	(20)	Salzgitter-Lichtenberg
	(21)	Westerlinde
	(22)	Baddeckenstedt B 6
	(23)	Salzgitter 3-way interchange A 7
