= Bundesstraße 248 =

Federal highway in Germany

B 248
- Bundesstraße 248

Route information
- Length: 207 km (129 mi)

Major junctions
- South end: Northeim
- North end: Dannenberg (Elbe)

Location
- Country: Germany
- States: Lower Saxony, Saxony-Anhalt

Highway system
- Roads in Germany; Autobahns; List; Federal; List; State; E-roads

The Bundesstraße 248 (abbreviation: B 248) is a German federal highway that runs from Northeim to Dannenberg (Elbe), where it ends in the town at its junction with the B 191. Shortly before, the road branches and a short section, the B 248a, runs over B 191 as far as the B 216 at Streetzer roundabout. In Wolfsburg the old B 248, widened to four lanes in the 1960s, has been renamed today as the A 39 motorway (autobahn).

== History ==
=== Origin ===
The southern section of the present-day Bundesstraße 248 between Northeim and Brunswick was referred to by the Duchy of Brunswick as Frankfurter Straße and upgraded between 1786 and 1794 into a surfaced road (chaussee). In Northeim this road merged into the B 3, which was also upgraded to a chaussee at the same time.

The centre section between Brunswick and Wolfsburg was upgraded into a chaussee between 1805 and 1816 and called the Berliner Straße.

The northern section between Wolfsburg and Salzwedel appeared between 1853 and 1855 as a district chaussee, which was built with funding from the participating districts.

=== Former route and description ===
The section between Brunswick and Seesen was elevated to the status of a Reichsstraße in 1932 and designated as Reichsstraße 64. Reichsstraße 248 between Northeim and Salzwedel was established in 1937.

This federal highway was cut in two places by the division of Germany and could not be driven from end to end again until 1989, when the border crossings between Brome and Mellin (on 18 November) and between Salzwedel and Lübbow were re-established.

== Importance for long-distance traffic ==
The B 248 is very important for long-distance traffic between Northeim and Seesen. When there is a traffic jam on the A 7 motorway which runs alongside it, traffic is diverted onto Bundesstraße 248. This causes an increase in traffic through the neighbouring villages and towns.

== Junction lists ==
Legend:

- I/C - Interchange, I/S - Intersection, RSA - Rest and service area, OBR - Overhead bridge restaurant, R/R - Restaurant and rest plaza, L/B - Layby, V/P - Vista point, TN - tunnel, T/P - Toll plaza, BR - Bridge
- C - Cloverleaf, S - Stack, T-A - Trumpet-A, T-B - Trumpet-B, DT - Directional-T/Y, SDT - Semi-Directional-T/Y, P-Y - Partial-Y, D - Diamond, P-C - Partial cloverleaf, D-D - Diverging diamond, D-R - Direct ramp

		Northeim A 7 E45 B 3 B 241
Diversion		Langenholtensen local diversion
		Imbshausen
		Echte B 445 A 7 E45
Diversion		Düderode local diversion
Diversion		Oldenrode local diversion
		Ildehausen
	(67)	Seesen A 7 E45
		Seesen B 64 B 243 B 242
Diversion		Oldenrode local diversion B 82
		Hahausen
Motor road		Kraftfahrstraße
		Hohenrode B 6
		shares route with the B 6
		Gitter
		Salzgitter Bad
End of the motor road		end of motor road
		Salzgitter Bad
		Beinum
		Lobmachtersen
		Barum
Diversion		Leinde local diversion
Diversion		Leiferde local diversion
		Rüningen
	(15)	Braunschweig-Rüningen A 39
		replaced by A 39
	(13)	Kreuz Braunschweig-Süd B 248
		Braunschweig
		shares route with the B 1
	(57)	Braunschweig-Ost A 2 E30
		Wendhausen
		Lehre
	(6)	Flechtorf A 39
		replaced by A 39
	(1)	Weyhausen A 39 B 188
Motor road		Kraftfahrstraße
End of the motor road		end of motor road
		Tabbenbeck
		Jembke
		Brome B 244
		Salzwedel B 71 B 190
		Lüchow (Wendland) B 493
		Dannenberg (Elbe) B 248a B 191 B 216

== See also ==
- List of federal roads in Germany
