= Austberg =

- Augsberg / Augstberg
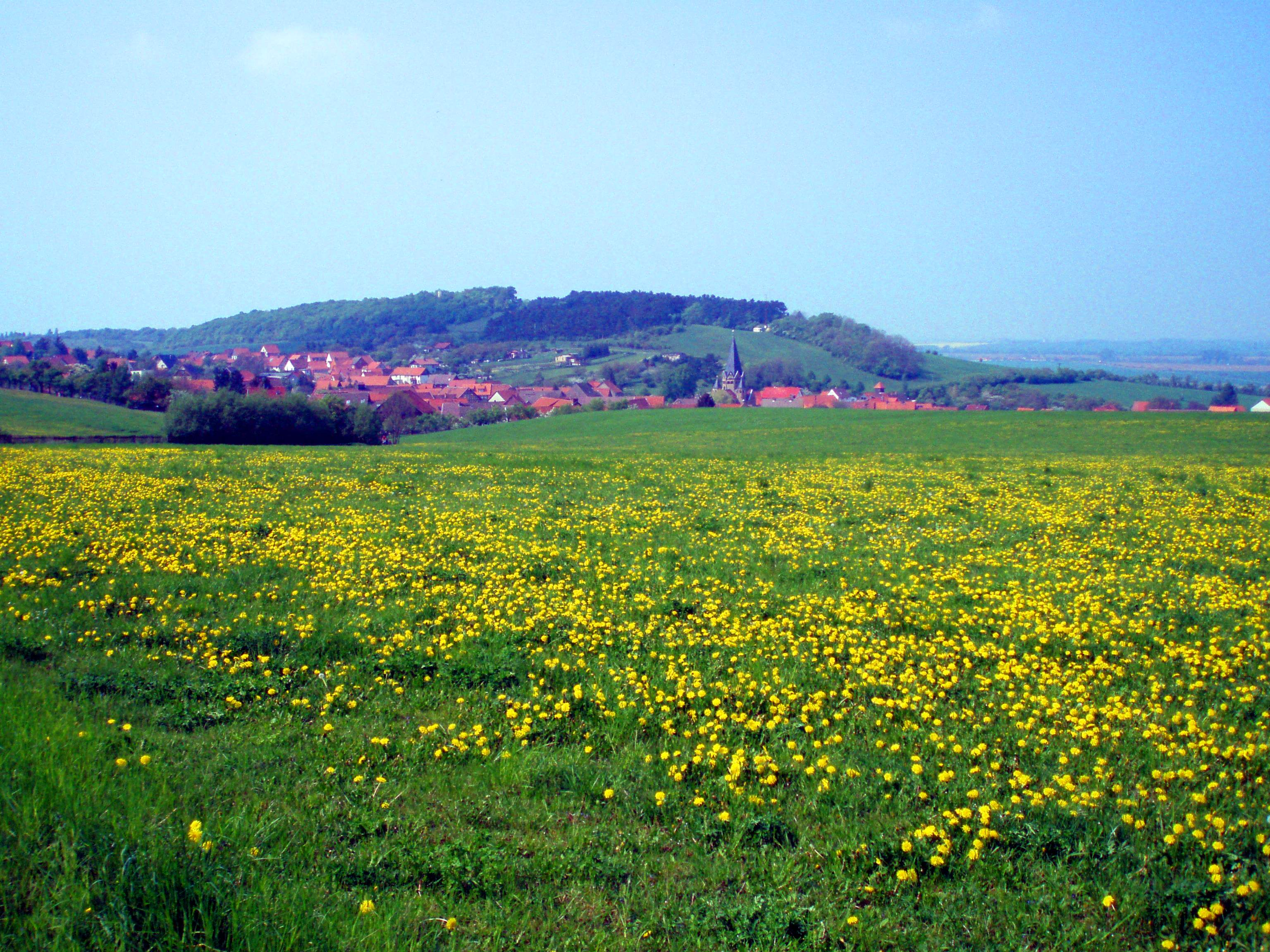
- View from the southeast over Benzingerode to the Austberg and Austberg Tower

Highest point
- Elevation: 292 m above sea level (NN) (958.0 ft)
- Coordinates: 51°50′16″N 10°51′35″E

Geography
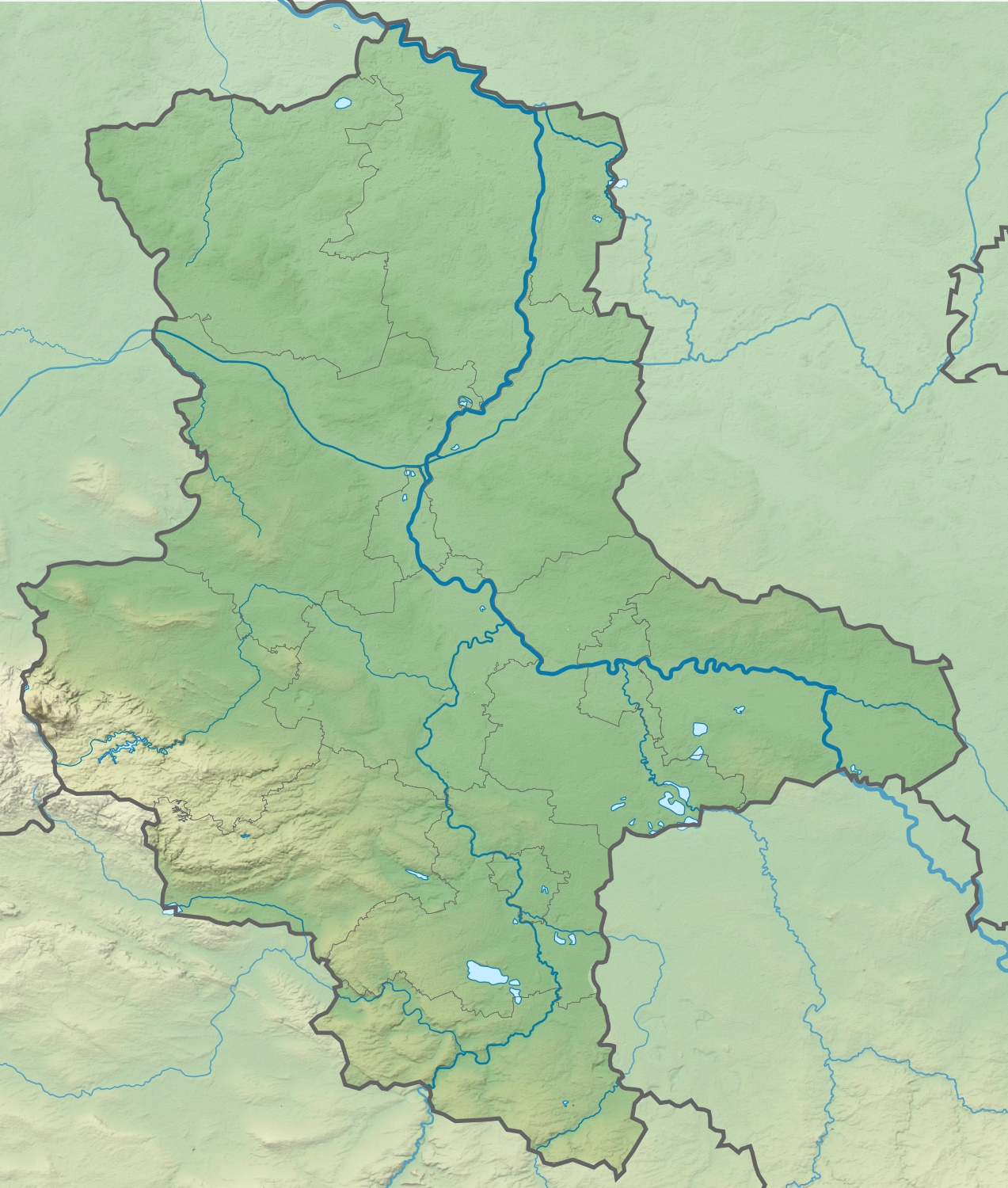
- Location within Saxony-Anhalt
- Location: Benzingerode, Harz district, Saxony-Anhalt (Germany)
- Parent range: Harz Foreland

Geology
- Mountain type: muschelkalk

The Austberg, also called the Augsberg or Augstberg, is a low hill, 292 m above sea level (NN), in the northern Harz Foreland near the village of Benzingerode in the district of Harz in the German state of Saxony-Anhalt.

== Location ==
The Austberg lies immediately north of the Harz Mountains in the northern Harz Foreland within the Harz/Saxony-Anhalt Nature Park. It rises northwest of the village of Benzingerode in the borough of Wernigerode. To the north the land descends to the actual Harz Foreland, to the south rises the Harz. A tributary of the Holtemme, the Hellbach, flows past it to the east; and on the far side of the stream is the Struvenberg hill.

== Austberg Tower ==
On the Austberg, slightly west of the summit at about 290 m above NN stands the former watchtower, variously known as the Austberg Tower, the Augsberg Tower or the Augstberg Tower (51°50′15.8″N 10°51′33.2″E), which is now an observation tower. Sometimes it is called a "watchtower" (Warte) instead of "tower" (Turm). The watchtower was built by the Regenstein counts around 1250. It served as a signal tower for their landwehr system and acted as a guard tower (Schutzturm) for the counts of Blankenburg. The round tower is made of muschelkalk rubble stone with plaster mortar. It has a diameter of about 4.4 m, a wall thickness of 1.2 m and stands about 10 m high. It was restored between 2006 and 2008/2009.

== Viewing points and walking ==
From the Austberg Tower the view ranges over Benzingerode, the Harz, the Harz Foreland, the Struvenberg and Wernigerode. A 7 kilometre long, signed, circular walk runs around the hill through interesting vegetation. The hill is largely formed of muschelkalk.
