= Heimburg (disambiguation) =

Heimburg may refer to:

- the town Heimburg in Saxony-Anhalt, Germany.
- the Heimburg Castle in Heimburg, Saxony-Anhalt, Germany.
- the castle Heimburg in Niederheimbach in Niederheimbach, Rhineland-Palatinate, Germany.
