= Bundesautobahn 395 =

Federal motorway in Germany

A 395
- Bundesautobahn 395

Route information
- Length: 35.5 km (22.1 mi)
- Existed: 1975–2019
- History: Bad Hartzburg to Vienenburg downgraded to B 4 and B 6 (now A 369) in 2001; Remainder renamed to A 36 in 2019

Major junctions
- North end: Melverode
- South end: Vienenburg

Location
- Country: Germany
- States: Lower Saxony

Highway system
- Roads in Germany; Autobahns; List; Federal; List; State; E-roads

Bundesautobahn 395 (translates from German as Federal Motorway 395, short form Autobahn 395, abbreviated as BAB 395 or A 395) was an autobahn in Germany. It has been redesignated as a part of the A 36 as of January 1, 2019.

The A 395 began at an interchange with the A 39 and B 248 south of Brunswick (Braunschweig). From there, the road headed in a general southerly direction, bypassing Wolfenbüttel, Schladen and other, smaller towns.

The southern end of the A 395 came in the town of Vienenburg, at a trumpet interchange with a freeway portion of the B 6/B 6n. The B 6 continues to the south and west towards Goslar and the B 4, while the B 6n continues east towards Leipzig, eventually meeting with the A 14.

The A 395 was the longest three-digit autobahn in Germany, although it was formerly 7 km longer. In 2001, the section of autobahn from Bad Harzburg to Schlewecke became the northernmost part of the B 4, while the section of freeway from that point to the current southern terminus was returned to the B 6. It was designated as A 369 in 2019.

The northernmost 400 m of the A 395, between the junctions Braunschweig-Melverode and Braunschweig-Süd, was not considered to be part of the autobahn system. There is an at-grade entrance and exit from a large car dealership and gas station along the southbound side of the road just before Braunschweig-Melverode. Therefore, the A 395 was officially considered to start immediately after that junction, and thus also had no connection to the remaining autobahn network.

== Exit list ==
Legend:

- I/C - Interchange, I/S - Intersection, RSA - Rest and service area, OBR - Overhead bridge restaurant, R/R - Restaurant and rest plaza, L/B - Layby, V/P - Vista point, TN - tunnel, T/P - Toll plaza, BR - Bridge
- C - Cloverleaf, S - Stack, T-A - Trumpet-A, T-B - Trumpet-B, DT - Directional-T/Y, SDT - Semi-Directional-T/Y, P-Y - Partial-Y, D - Diamond, P-C - Partial cloverleaf, D-D - Diverging diamond, D-R - Direct ramp

km	Exit	Name	Destinations	Notes
	(1)	Brunschweig-Süd 4-way interchange A 39 B 248		
		Tankstelle		
	(-)	Braunschweig-Melverode		
	(2)	Braunschweig-Heldberg		
	(3)	Braunschweig-Stöckheim		
	(4)	Wolfenbüttel-Nord B 79		
		Okerbrücke 250 m		
	(5)	Wolfenbüttel-Nordwest		
	(6)	Wolfenbüttel-West		
	(7)	Wolfenbüttel-Süd		
	(8)	Flöthe		
		Grünbrücke 10 m		
		Straßenbrücke 70 m		
		Rest area Werla		
		Talbrücke Warnetal 130 m		
		Rest area Ziegenberg		
	(9)	Schladen-Nord B 82		
	(10)	Schladen-Süd B 82		
	(11)	Lengde		
		Okertalbrücke 200 m		
	(12)	Vienenburg B 241		
		Bahn- und Straßenbrücke 150 m		
	(13)	Osterwieck/Vienenburg-Ost		
	(14)	Vienenburg 3-way interchange B 6 B 6n		
