= Ziegenberg =

The name Ziegenberg is German for "Goat Hill" and may refer to:

- Ziegenberg (Saxony-Anhalt), a low ridge and nature reserve in Saxony-Anhalt, Germany
- Ziegenberg (Thuringia), a hill in Thuringia, Germany
- Kozí vrch, a hill in the Czech Republic formerly called the Ziegenberg
- Ziegenberg (Ottendorf an der Rittschein), a cadastral municipality in Styria, Austria
- Langenhain-Ziegenberg, a place near Bad Nauheim in Hesse, Germany
- Ziegenberg Castle, a ruined castle near Ziegenhagen in Werra-Meißner-Kreis in North Hesse
