= Stapenberg =

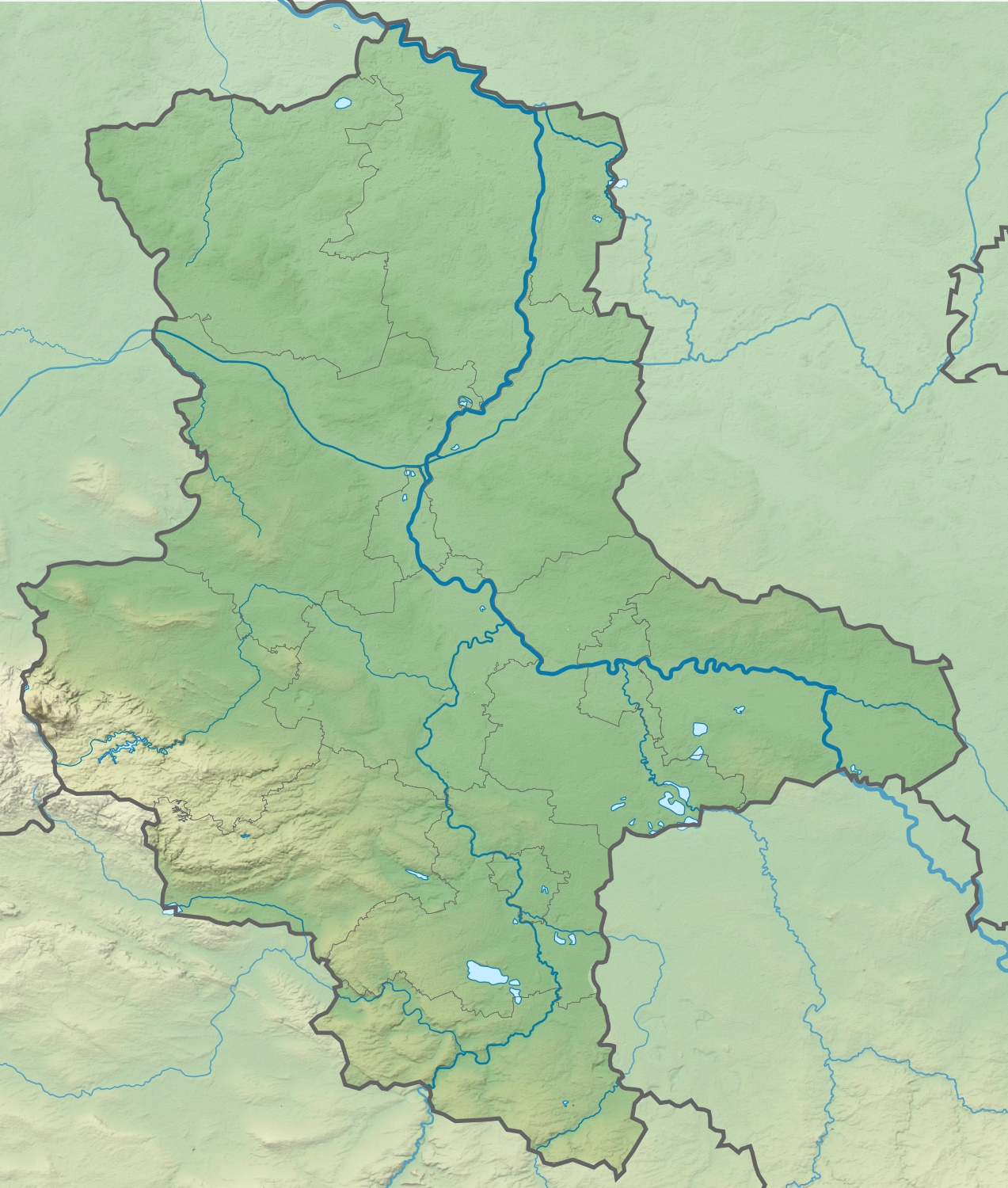
- Location within Saxony-Anhalt

Highest point
- Elevation: 443.4 m above sea level (NN) (1,455 ft)
- Coordinates: 51°49′33″N 10°50′50″E

Geography
- Location: Benzingerode, Harz district, Saxony-Anhalt, Germany
- Parent range: Harz Mountains

The Stapenberg is a 443-metre-high (1,453 ft) hill spur in the Harz Mountains of central Germany in Harz district in the federal state of Saxony-Anhalt.

== Location ==
The Stapenberg lies on the northern edge of the Harz within the Harz/Saxony-Anhalt Nature Park. It rises southwest of the village of Benzingerode in the borough of Wernigerode. To the north the country descends into the northern Harz Foreland.

== History ==
In 1470 the hill came into the ownership of a local knight, Hans Knauth.

== Views and hiking ==
The Stapenberg is known because of its views of the Brocken, the highest peak in the Harz, and over the northern Harz Foreland between Wernigerode and Heimburg, which are currently visible thanks to logging on the summit. A steeply climbing footpath runs over the hill from the direction of Benzingerode towards the Hermannsweg and Wernigerode Castle or towards Elbingerode (Harz). On the summit is check point no. 33 in the network of walking trails called the Harzer Wandernadel.
