= Benzingerode =

Village in Saxony-Anhalt, Germany

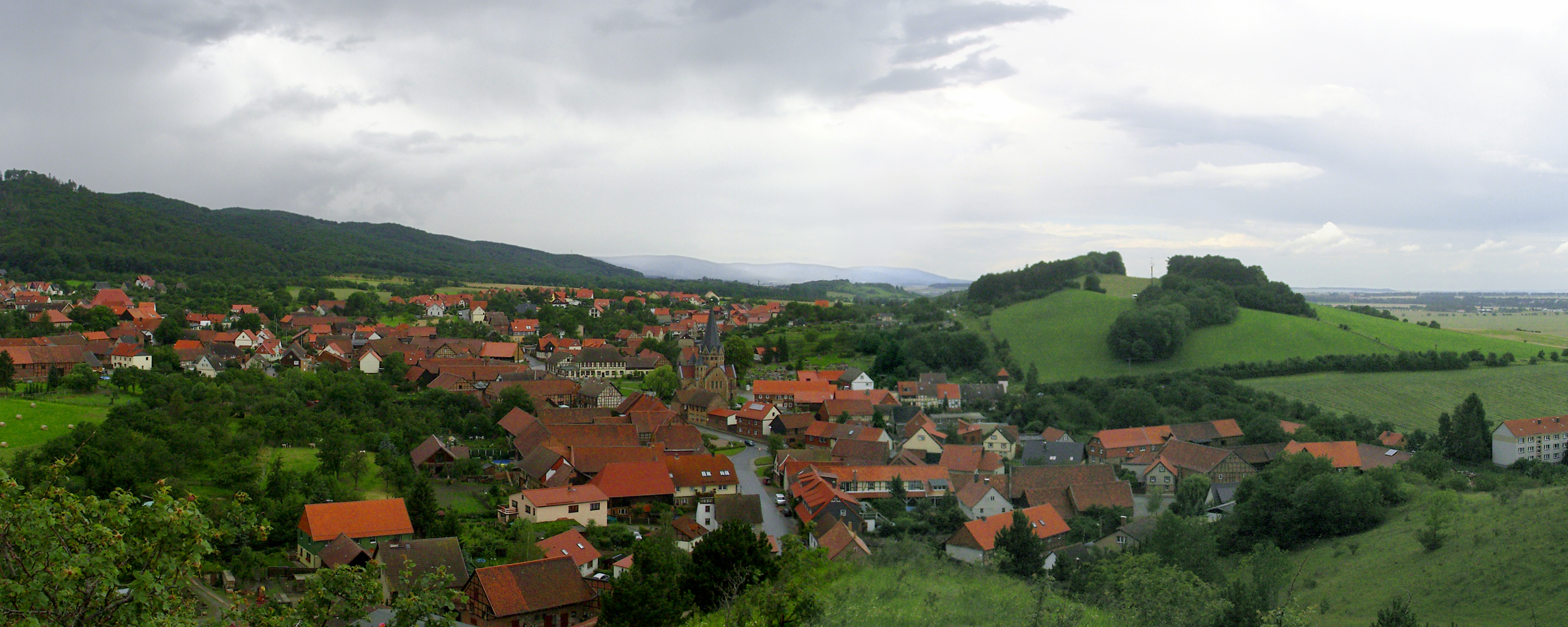
- Benzingerode, seen from the Struvenberg
- Interactive map of Benzingerode
- Coordinates: 51°50′04″N 10°52′02″E
- Country: Germany
- State: Saxony-Anhalt
- District: Harz
- Town: Wernigerode

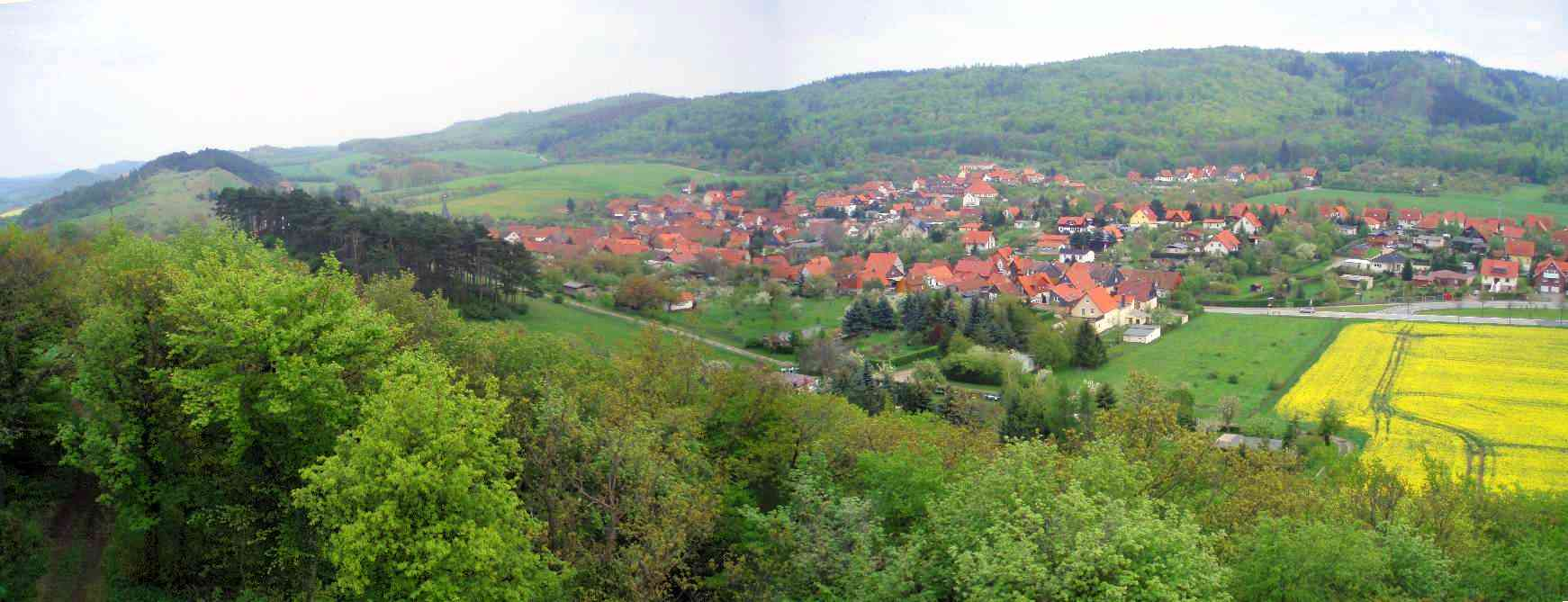
Benzingerode, seen from the Austberg

Benzingerode has been a village incorporated into the borough of Wernigerode since 1 April 1993. It is located in the district of Harz in the German state of Saxony-Anhalt. Situated on the northeastern edge of the Harz Mountains, the settlement can look back on a history of around 800 years and was first mentioned in 1212 in the feudal register of Count Heinrich I of Regenstein.

== Location ==
Benzingerode lies in the North Harz about 7 kilometres east of Wernigerode, on the old B 6 federal road that runs through the middle of the village and branches off to Silstedt at the eastern exit. Southwest of Benzingerode liest the Stapenberg. A low ridge, the Ziegenberge runs eastwards towards Heimburg on which is the site of an old hillfort, the Struvenburg.

== Transport and infrastructure ==
In 2024, geotechnical drilling began for the planned Fenstermacherberg Tunnel, a major infrastructure project intended to divert heavy traffic from the B 244 away from Wernigerode and its surrounding districts, including Benzingerode. The tunnel, classified as a priority project in the Federal Transport Infrastructure Plan 2030, would connect the Upper Harz region directly with the A 36 motorway. The drilling work, carried out by the Landesstraßenbaubehörde Sachsen-Anhalt, aims to assess geological conditions along the Harznordrand fault zone before detailed planning can proceed.

== See also ==
- Harz
- Upper Harz
- Wernigerode
