= Ziegenberg (Saxony-Anhalt) =

Geographical feature and nature reserve on the Harz Mountains in central Germany

Coordinates: 51°49.73′N 10°53.32′E

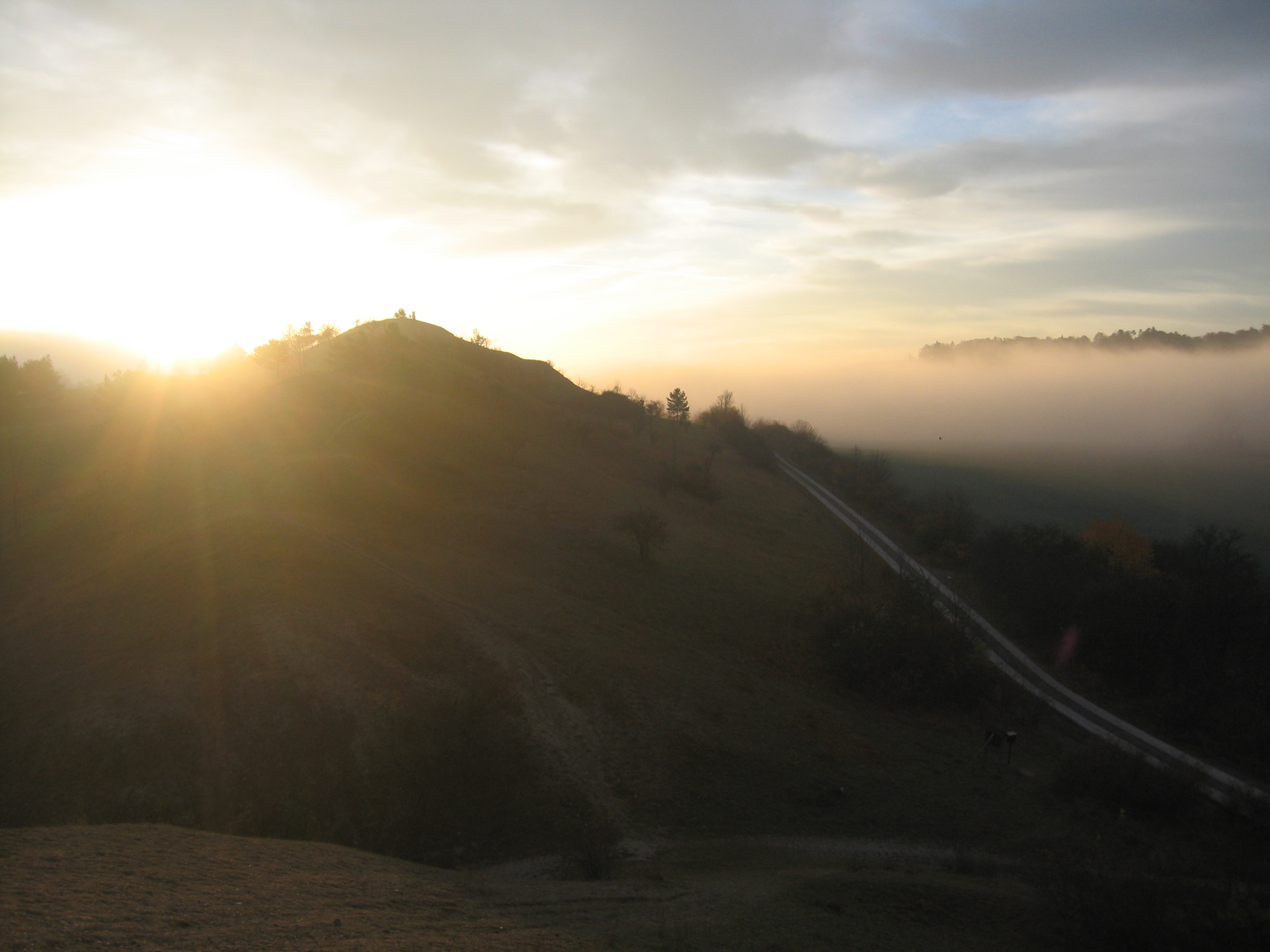
Sunrise over the Ziegenberg hill itself, seen from the Struvenberg

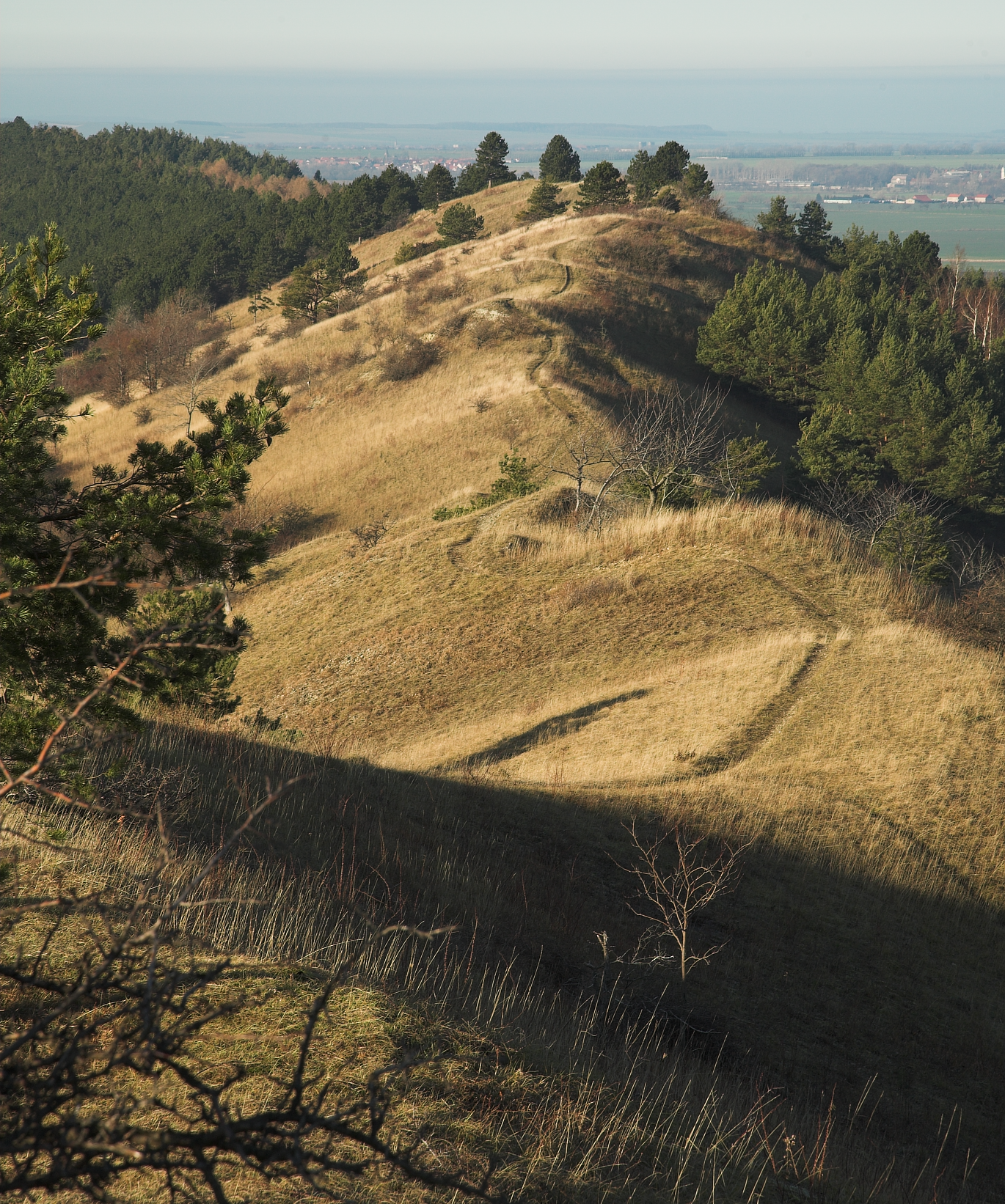
Crest of the Ziegenberge ridge, looking NW along the Struvenberg

The Ziegenberg is a low ridge between the villages of Benzingerode and Heimburg on the northern edge of the Harz Mountains in central Germany. The ridge is a designated nature reserve. The reserve has an area of 88.4 hectares and has a variety of habitats including mesophytic grassland (Halbtrockenrasen), bushes, pine woods and wet meadows. Its highest points are the eponymous Ziegenberg (315.7 metres above NN) and the Struvenberg (291 m)

== Geology ==
As part of the northern uplift zone of the Harz, the Ziegenberg was formed during the Hercynian mountain building phase. As it was uplifted, the horizontal strata of the surrounding area, mainly consisting of muschelkalk, were tilted. The northern part of the Ziegenberg is characterized by silt and marl.

== Flora ==
Within the nature reserve are the northernmost communities of Lotharingian or French Flax (Linum leonii).

Amongst the other plants that occur here are the Burnet Saxifrage (Pimpinella saxifraga), Large Self-heal (Prunella grandiflora), Fringed Gentian (Gentianopsis ciliata), Sickle hare's ear (Bupleurum falcatum) and Stemless carline thistle (Carlina acaulis).

== Land use and nature reserve ==
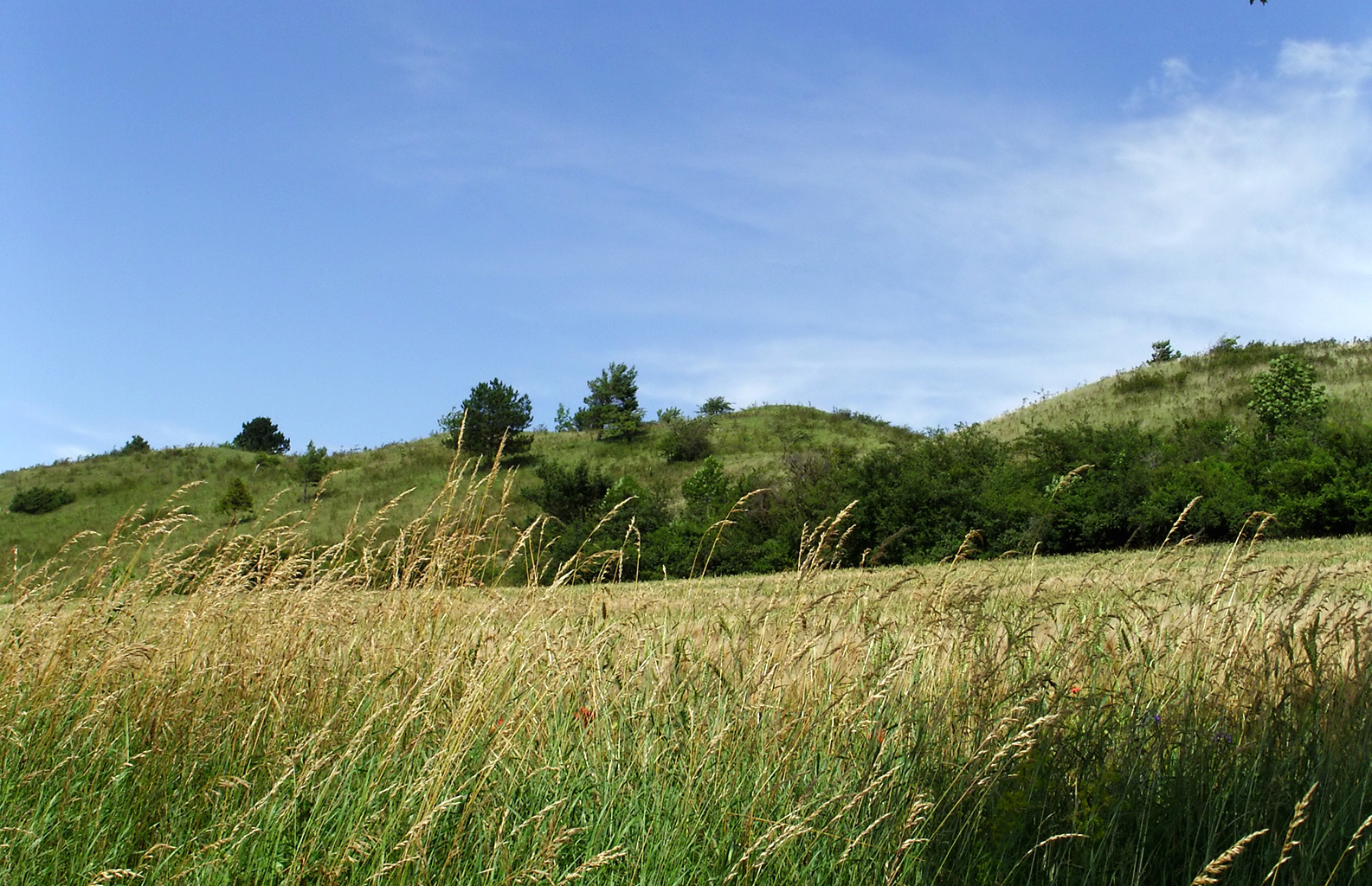
Southern slopes of the Struvenberg

Just before the hill drops away towards Benzingerode, the remains of fortifications belonging to a 10th-century fortress, the Struveburg are visible in the terrain. After the woods had been cleared, the hill ridge was used for centuries as grazing land. Later parts of the area were reforested with Black Pine (Pinus nigra) and quarries established.

The aim of the reserve, created on 1 January 1982, is "the protection and conservation of arid and semi-arid grassland with their sub-Mediterranean plant communities and diverse insect fauna" and the conservation of geological features. To this end, the hill is occasionally grazed by sheep and scrub is cleared away. The pine forest of the southern slope is to be turned into an area of forest steppe with sessile oak. Other areas will be left to develop perfectly naturally.

The crest of the ridge is partly accessible on two parallel paths. Along the foot of the southern slope runs a dirt track.
