= Struvenburg =

- Benzingerode
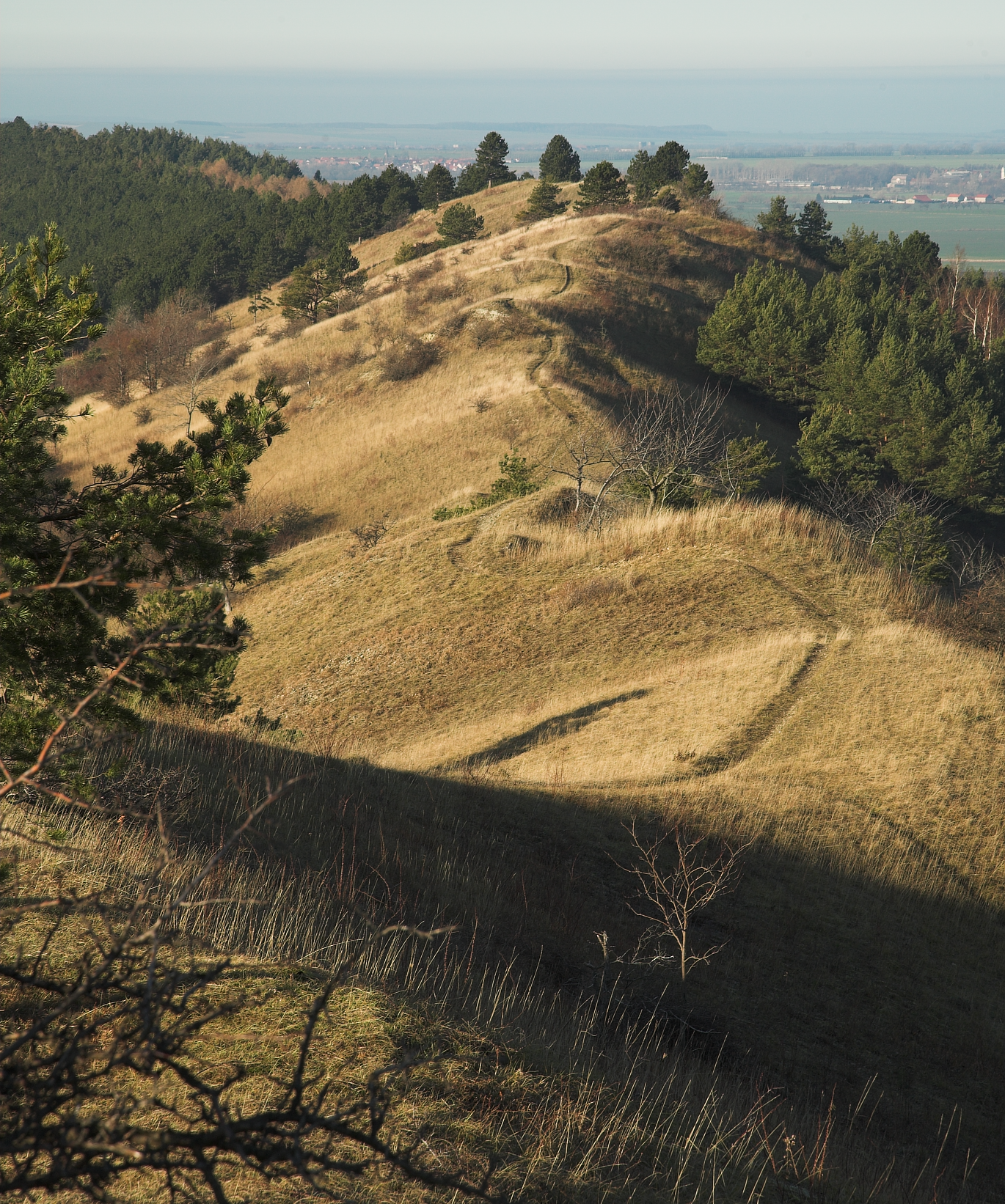
- View from the Ziegenberg of the Struvenberg, at the western end of which (out of view) are the remnants of the Struvenburg

Site information
- Type: hill castle
- Code: DE-ST
- Condition: Erdwälle

Location
- Coordinates: 51°50′00″N 10°53′00″E

The Struvenburg was a medieval castle immediately east of Benzingerode, a village in the borough of Wernigerode in the district of Harz in the German state of Saxony-Anhalt. Today only a few earthworks remain. Very little is known about this castle. The name may be derived from the adjective struf = scrubby or rough.

== Location ==
The site of the castle is on an isolated east-west limestone ridge, the Struvenberg, that descends towards the west into the basin where the village is situated, and is continued eastwards by the Ziegenberg. The castle is best reached from the western (village) side.

== Layout ==
Whilst the steep 60° slope on the southern side of the ridge facing the Harz Mountains provided a good natural defence, the other sides were protected by straight ramparts with ditches in front of them.

The ramparts, which are still recognisable today, clearly show the two adjacent rectangular wards of the castle. The eastern ward, with its deeper ditch to the west and its higher earthworks, is presumably the main, or upper, ward. The upper ward measures 70 × 100 metres, the lower ward 50 to 70 × 135 metres. Another outwork with a length of about 70 metres lies on the extreme western slope of the ridge.

The Struvenburg was a hillfort typical of the Harz.

There used to be a checkpoint (No. 83) on the Harzer Wandernadel hiking network located between the Struvenberg and Ziegenberg.

== History ==
The castle may date to the Carolingian era, because its archaeological finds date to the 9th century. Because other finds are clearly of Saxon origin, it is possible that the 9th-century castle was built on the site of an even older hillfort.

Little is known of the significance of the castle. From its strategic location – the castle lay close to an important crossroads – it may have had a military purpose in connexion with the overthrow of the local Saxon population by the Franks.

== Sources ==
- Erich Schafranek: Blankenburg am Harz: Bodetal, Regenstein, Rübeländer Höhlen (Unser kleines Wanderheft 77). Leipzig 1958.
- Johann Christoph Stübner: Denkwürdigkeiten des Fürstenthums Blankenburg und des demselben inkorporirten Stiftsamts Walkenried. Wernigerode 1788-1790.
- Fritz Schlimmer: Die „Struvenburg“ bei Benzingerode, under Kultstätten A-Z, Benzingerode, Struvenburg, Texte at
