= Bundesstraße 244 =

Federal highway in Germany

B 244
- Bundesstraße 244

Route information
- Length: 156 km (97 mi)

Major junctions
- From: B 4
- To: B 27

Location
- Country: Germany
- States: Lower Saxony, Saxony-Anhalt

Highway system
- Roads in Germany; Autobahns; List; Federal; List; State; E-roads

Bundesstraße 244 (abbreviation: B 244) is a federal road in Germany that branches off the B 4 west of Dedelstorf towards the east and runs through Wittingen, Brome, Rühen, Velpke, Helmstedt, Schöningen, Dardesheim, Wernigerode to Elbingerode, where it ends at the B 27.

== Junction lists ==
Legend:

- I/C - Interchange, I/S - Intersection, RSA - Rest and service area, OBR - Overhead bridge restaurant, R/R - Restaurant and rest plaza, L/B - Layby, V/P - Vista point, TN - tunnel, T/P - Toll plaza, BR - Bridge
- C - Cloverleaf, S - Stack, T-A - Trumpet-A, T-B - Trumpet-B, DT - Directional-T/Y, SDT - Semi-Directional-T/Y, P-Y - Partial-Y, D - Diamond, P-C - Partial cloverleaf, D-D - Diverging diamond, D-R - Direct ramp

	Dedelstorf B 4
	Hankensbüttel
	Wittingen
	Brunswick–Uelzen railway
	Brome B 248
	Rühen
BR	Berlin-Lehrte Railway
	Velpke B 188
(61)	Helmstedt-West A 2
	Helmstedt B 1 B 245a
BR	Brunswick–Magdeburg railway
	Schöningen B 82
	Jerxheim
	Dardesheim B 79
BR	Halberstadt–Vienenburg railway
TN	Tunnel B6
	Wernigerode B 6
	Heudeber-Danstedt–Vienenburg railway
	Harzquerbahn
	Elbingerode
	Elbingerode B 27

== See also ==
- List of federal highways in Germany
