= Bundesstraße 191 =

Federal highway in Germany

B 191
- Bundesstraße 191

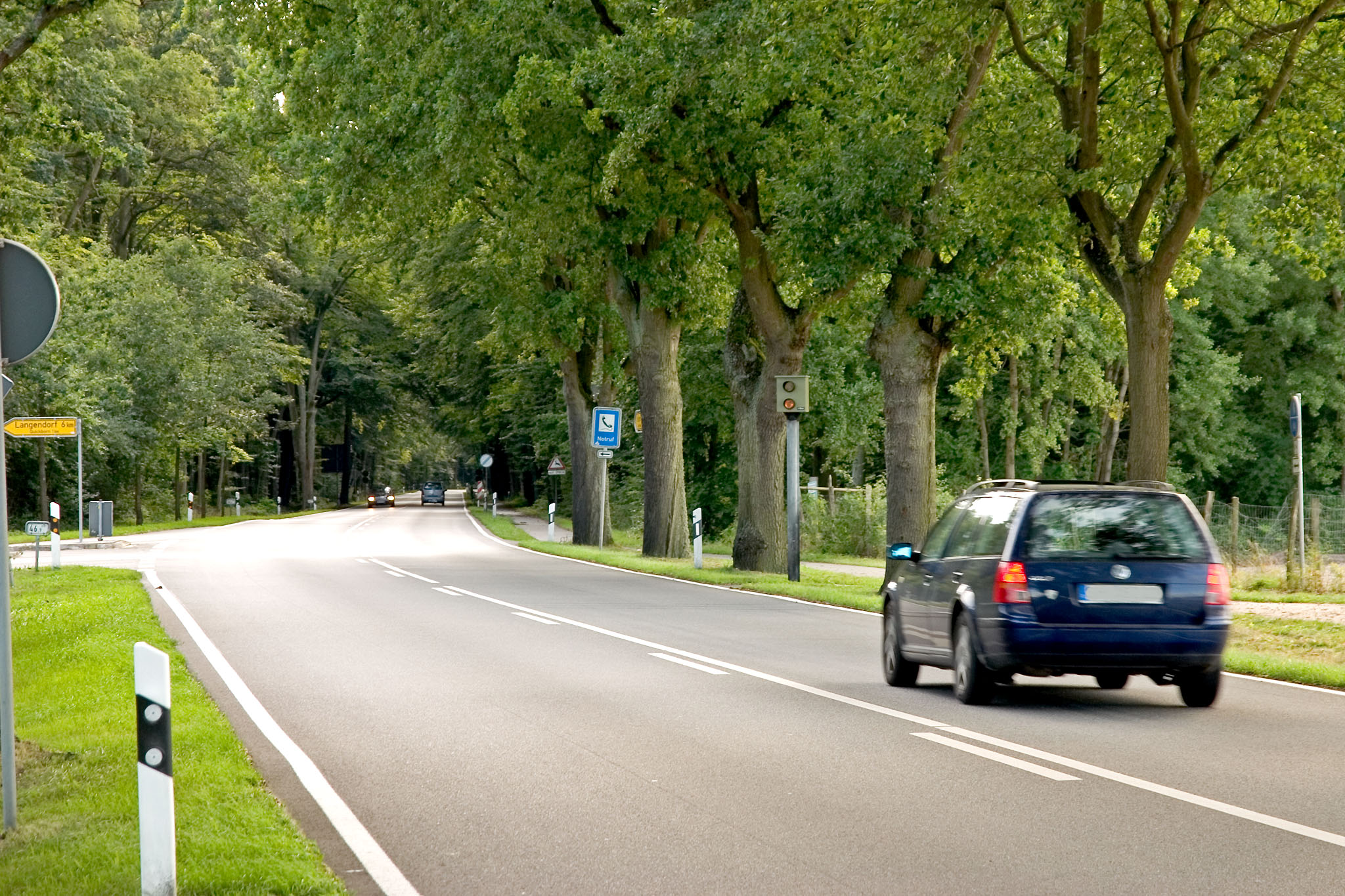
- B 191 where it branches to Langendorf

Route information
- Length: 210 km (130 mi)

Major junctions
- East end: Celle at the B 3
- West end: Plau am See at the B 103

Location
- Country: Germany
- States: Lower Saxony, Mecklenburg-Vorpommern

Highway system
- Roads in Germany; Autobahns; List; Federal; List; State; E-roads

The Bundesstraße 191 or B 191 is a German federal road. It begins in Celle at the B 3 and ends north of Plau am See, connecting to the B 103 at the new bypass.

== History ==
=== Origins ===
The old unmetalled road between Ludwigslust and Parchim was upgraded in 1845 to a surfaced road. One year later roadworks were completed as far as Lübz and, in 1936, the first road bridge over the Elbe was opened in Dömitz .

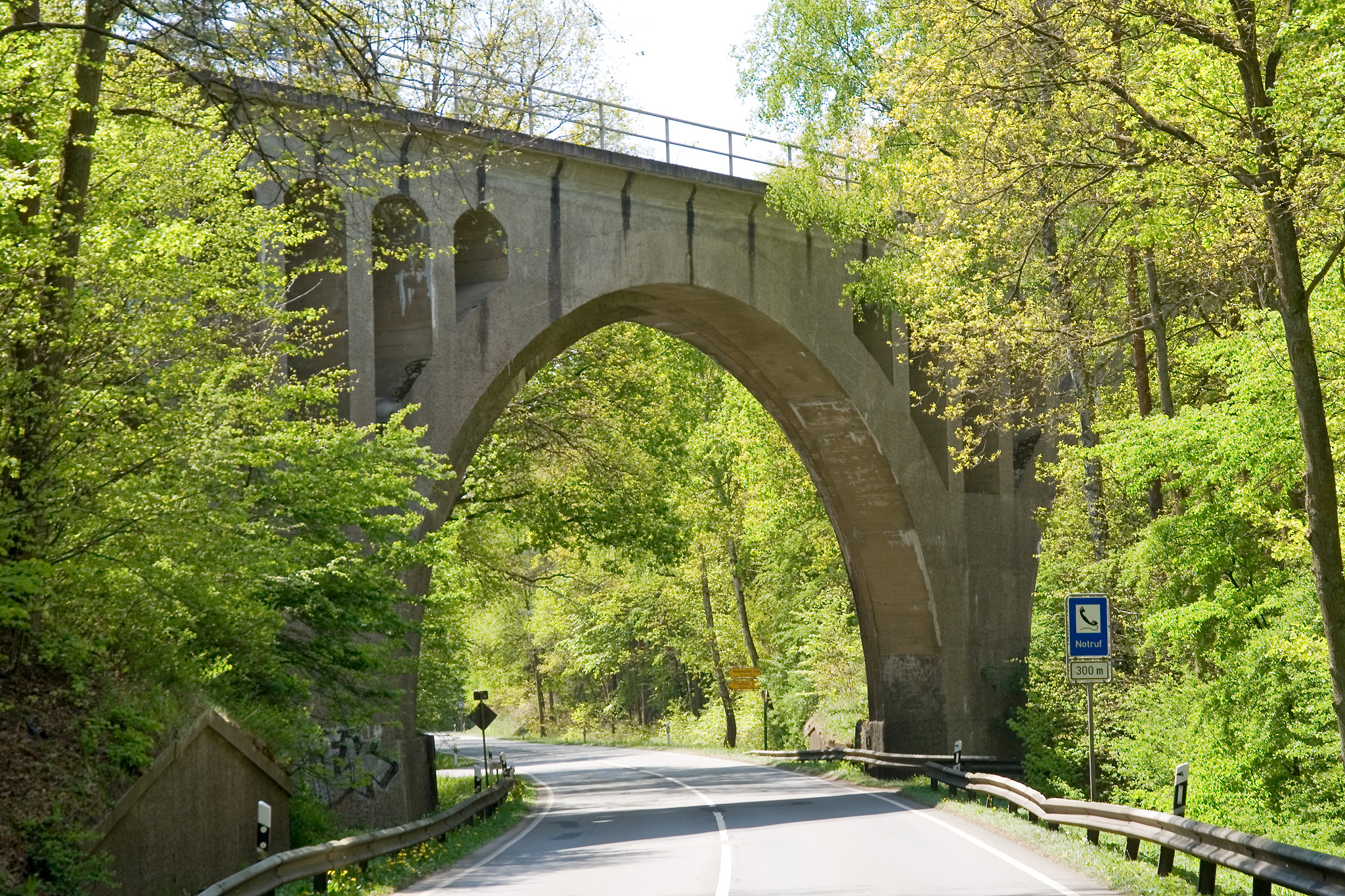
Railway viaduct over the B 191 near Pudripp.

=== Old routes and names ===
In 1937 the road was designated as Reichsstraße 191. During the division of Germany it was interrupted at the Inner German Border where the Elbe bridge had been partly destroyed in an airstrike in April 1945. The western section between Celle and the banks of the Elbe near Dannenberg (Elbe) belonged to West Germany and was called the Bundesstraße 191. The eastern section between Dömitz and Plau am See belonged to East Germany and was known as Fernverkehrsstraße 191 (abbr: F 191).

Since the rebuilding of the 970 m long Elbe Bridge at Dömitz in 1992 it has been possible to drive along this federal highway from end to end.

== See also ==
- List of federal highways in Germany
