= Rüningen =

- Borough of Braunschweig
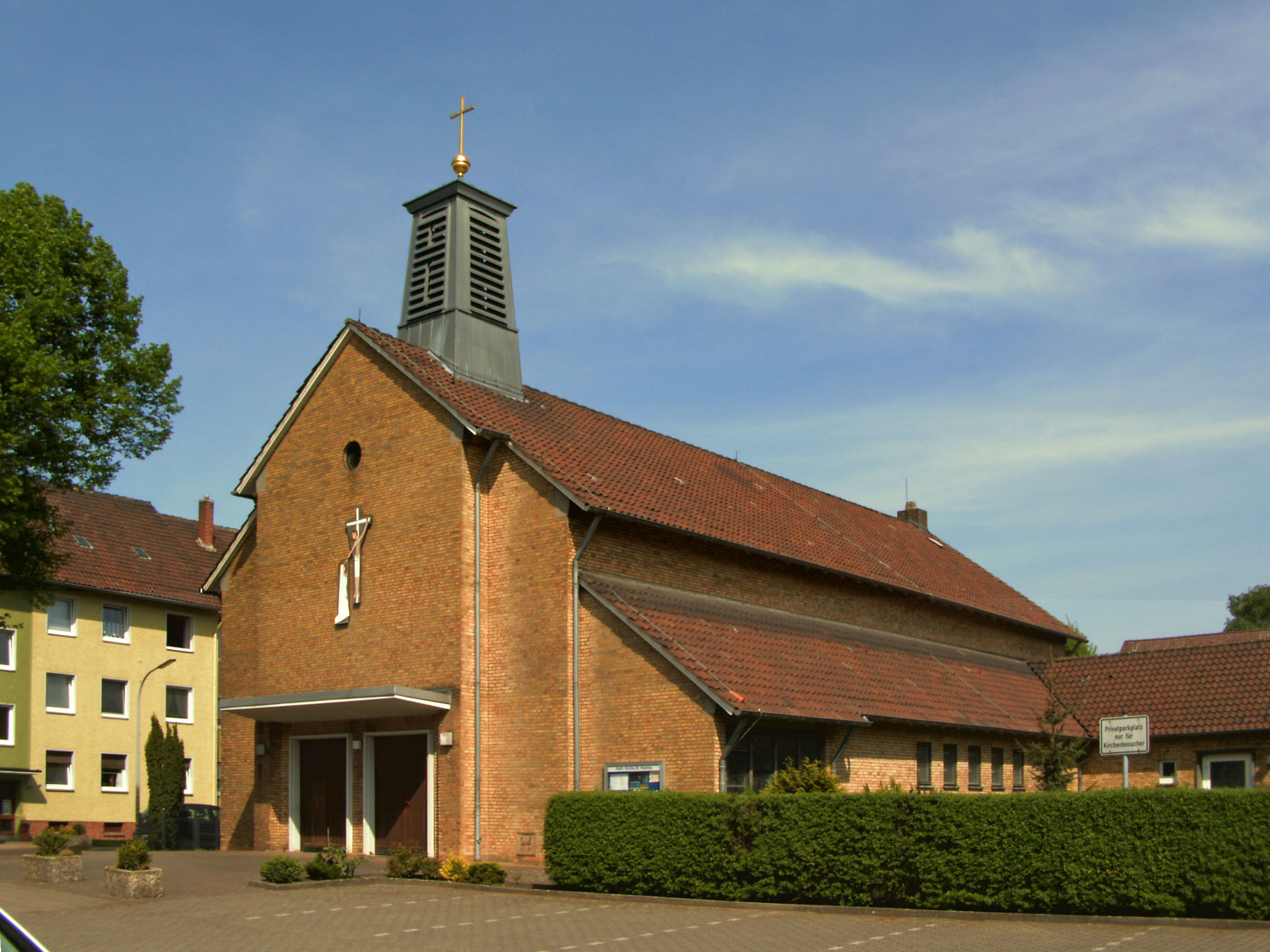
- Church of Saint Hedwig in Rüningen.

- Coat of arms

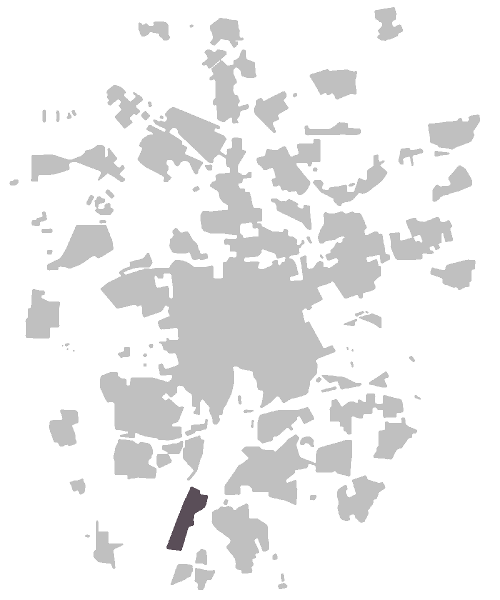
- Location of Rüningen within Braunschweig
- Interactive map of Rüningen
- Location within Germany Location within Lower Saxony
- Coordinates: 52°13′19″N 10°30′10″E
- Country: Germany
- State: Lower Saxony
- District: urban district
- City: Braunschweig

Government
  - Mayor: Jürgen Buchheister (SPD)

Area
  - Total: 03.16 km^{2} (1.22 sq mi)

Population (2020-12-31)
  - Total: 2,932
  - Density: 928/km^{2} (2,400/sq mi)
- Time zone: UTC+01:00 (CET)
  - Summer (DST): UTC+02:00 (CEST)
- Postal codes: 38122
- Dialling codes: 0531
- Vehicle registration: BS

Rüningen (German pronunciation: [ˈʁyːnɪŋən]) is a Stadtbezirk (borough) on the river Oker in the southern part of Braunschweig, Germany.

== History ==
The village of Rüningen was first mentioned as Riungi in documents during the late 8th century. The village outside of Braunschweig was razed numerous times during the Middle Ages, so that during the late 14th century a fortified tower, the Rüninger Turm, was built there as part of the medieval fortifications of Braunschweig. During the 17th century an inn and toll house was added to the Rüninger Turm. The tower, having lost its military importance, was slighted in 1724, although the toll house remained. The decrepit toll house was torn down at its original location and rebuilt at the Altstadtmarkt in the city centre of Braunschweig after the end of World War II. In 1974, Rüningen, until then part of the disbanded rural district of Braunschweig, was incorporated into the city of Braunschweig and became a city district.

== Mill ==
Rüningen is home to one of the largest gristmills in Germany. The mill, originally built sometime before 1312, was destroyed and rebuilt multiple times during its history.

== Gallery ==
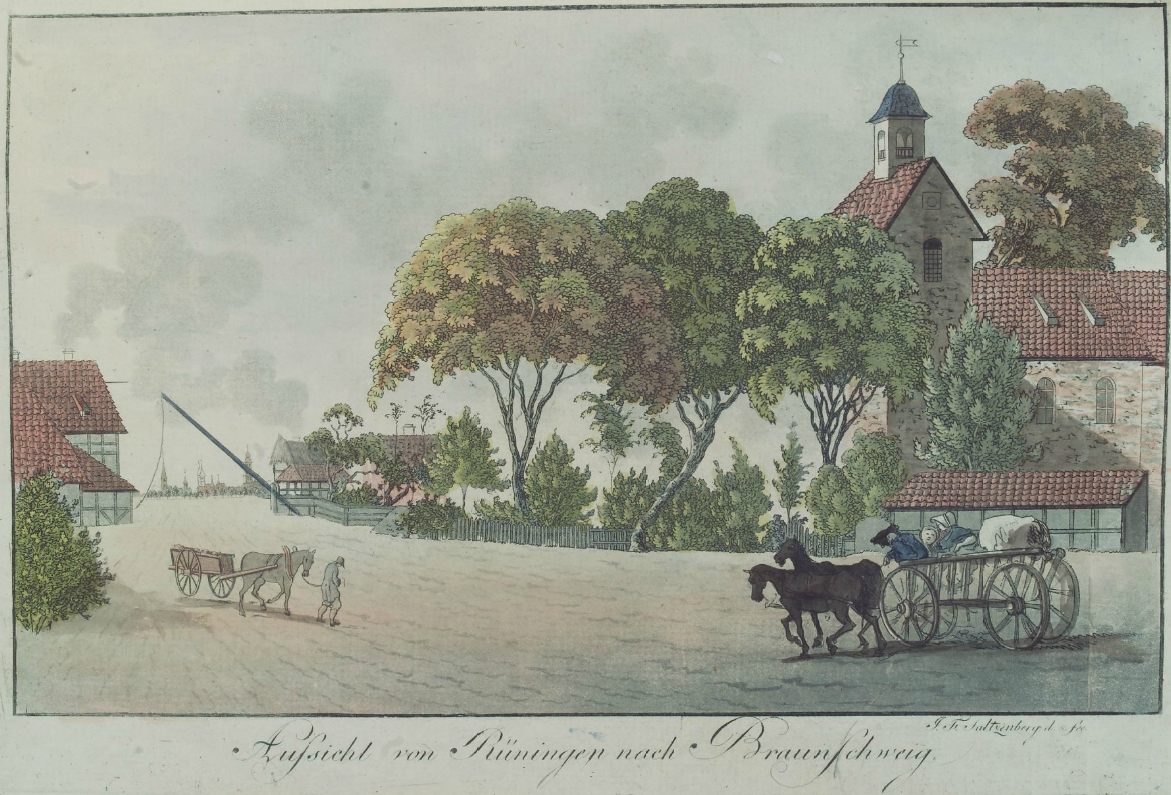
Rüningen, c. 1800.

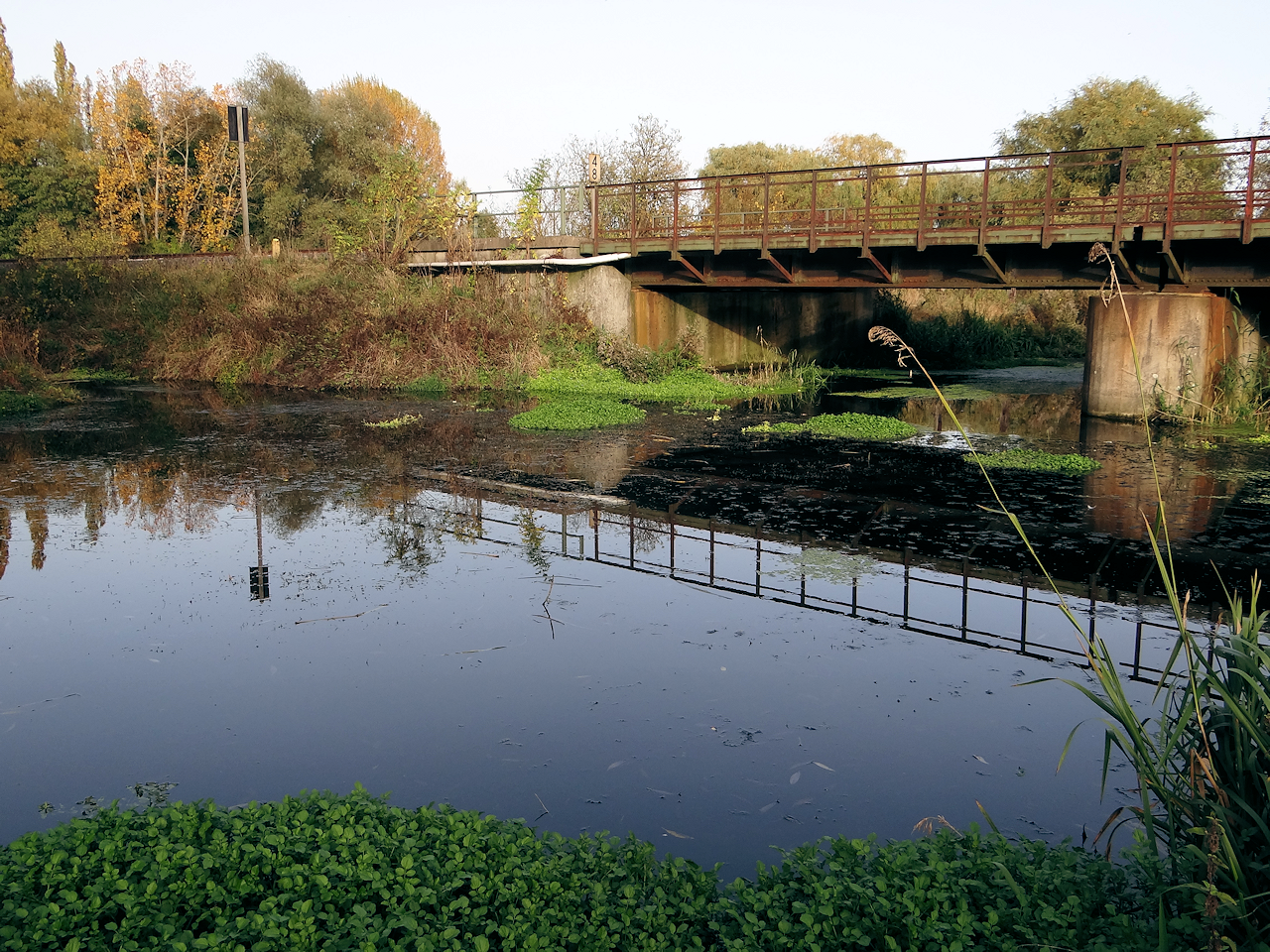
Railway bridge over the river Oker in Rüningen.

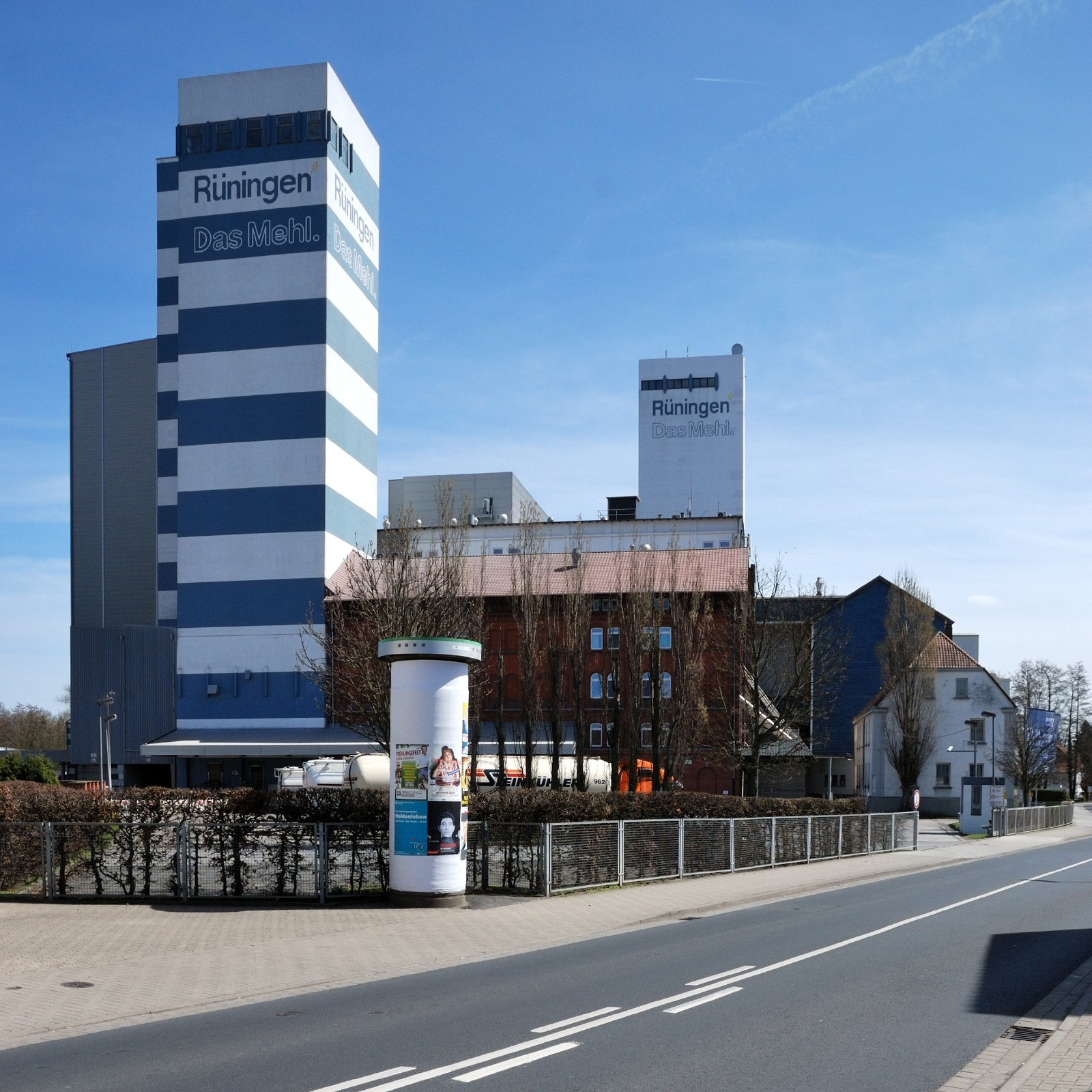
Mill of Rüningen

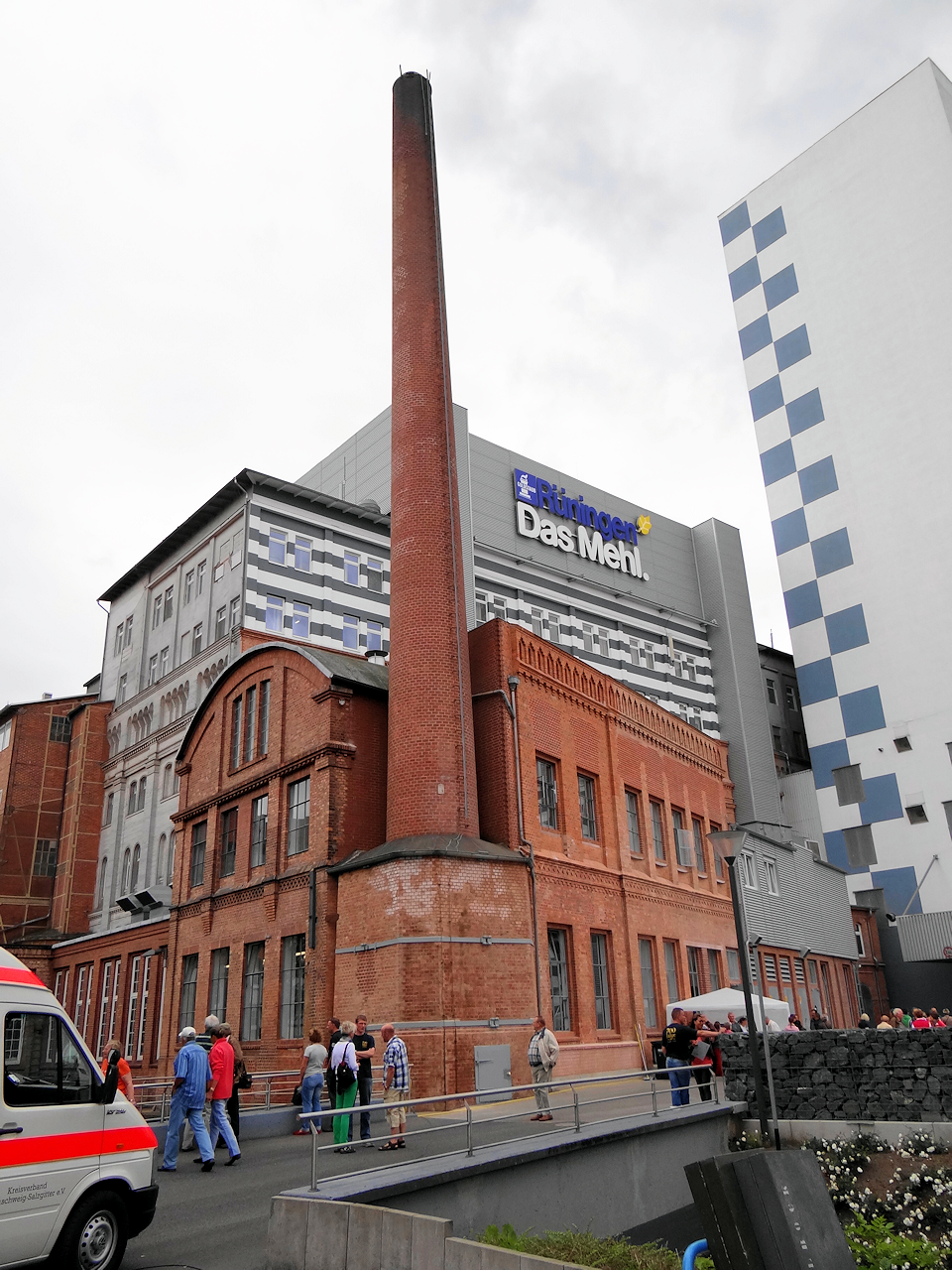
Mill of Rüningen

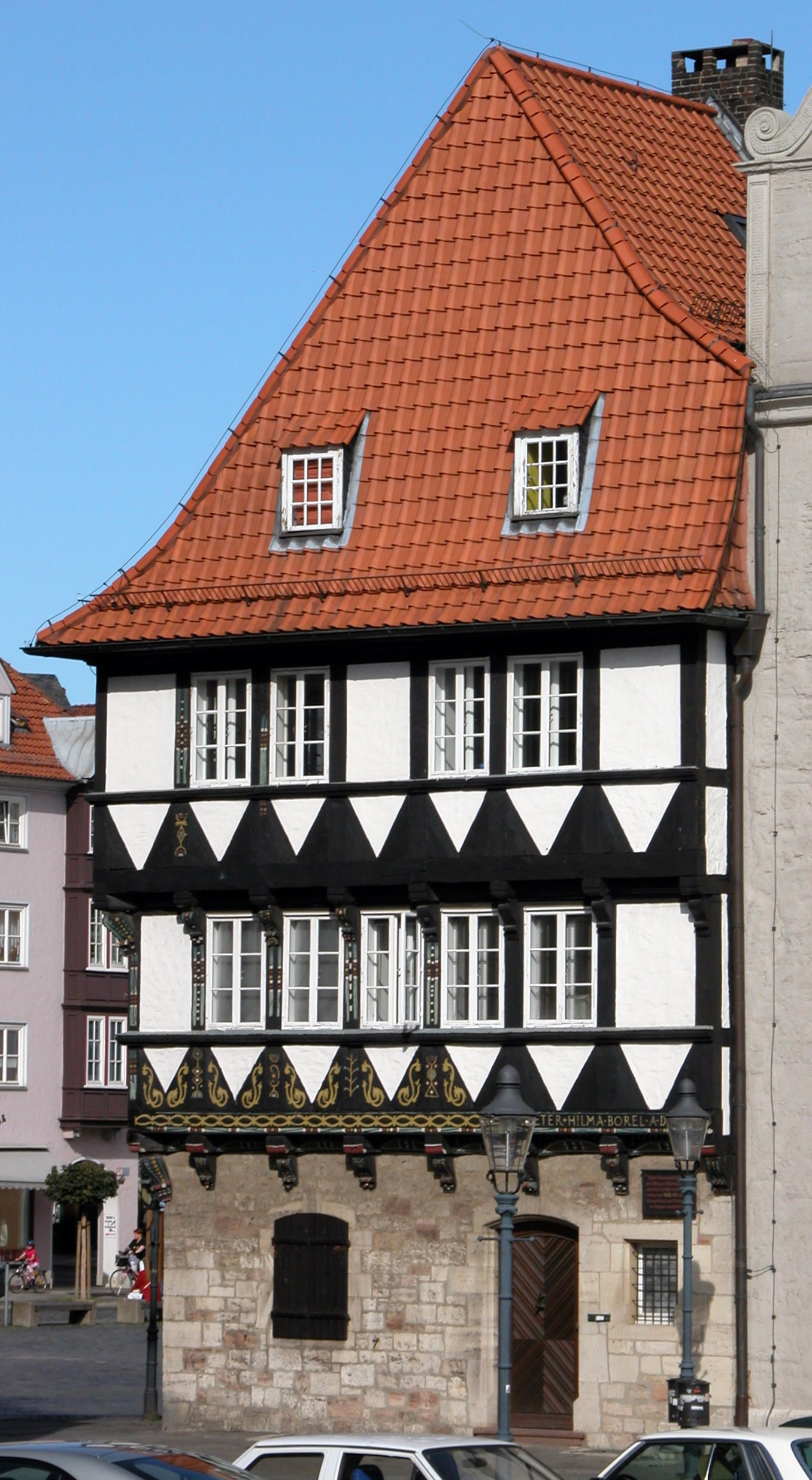
Rebuilt toll house

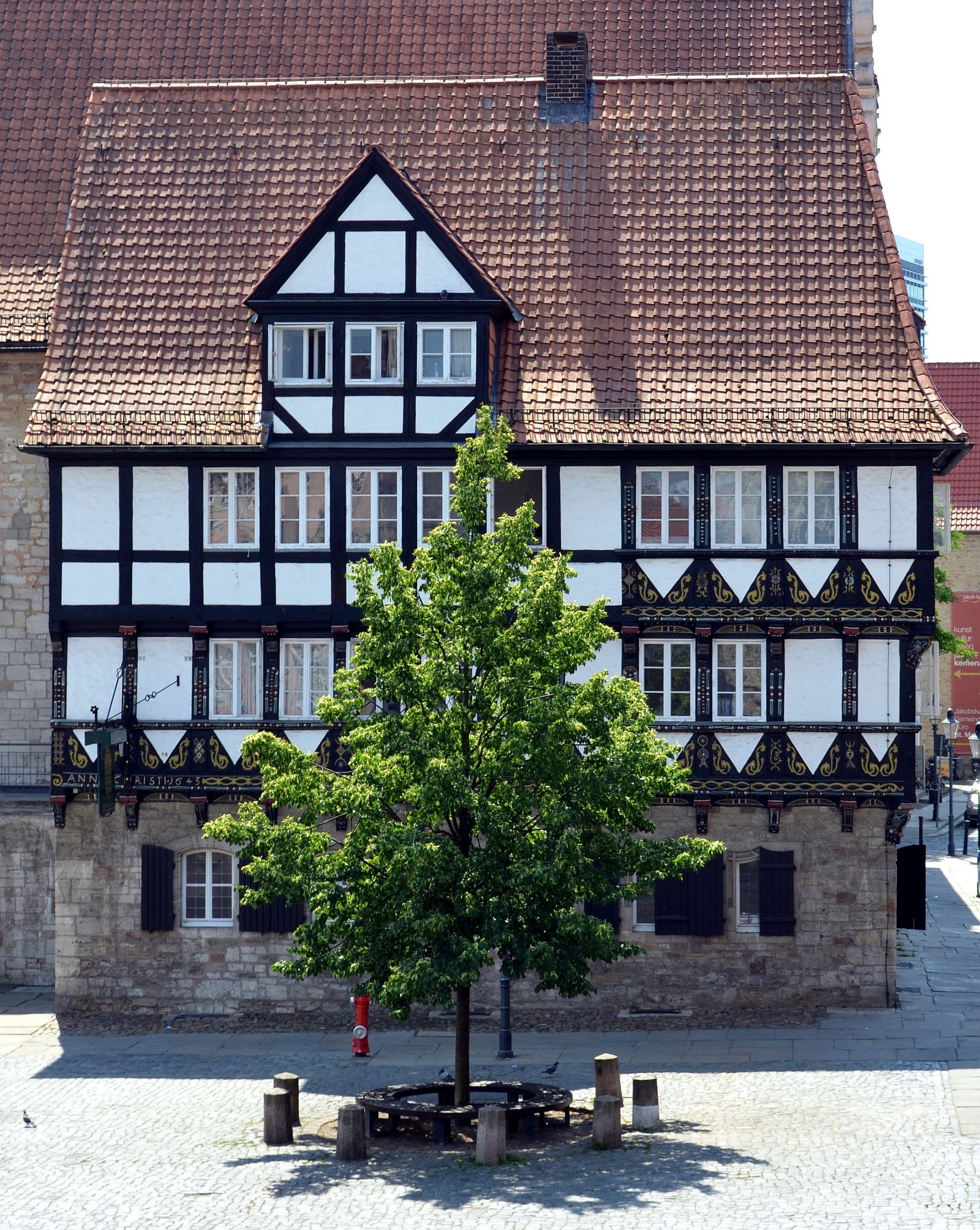
Rebuilt toll house

== Politics ==
The district mayor Jürgen Buchheister is a member of the Social Democratic Party of Germany.
