= Bundesstraße 188 =

Federal highway in Germany

B 188
- Bundesstraße 188
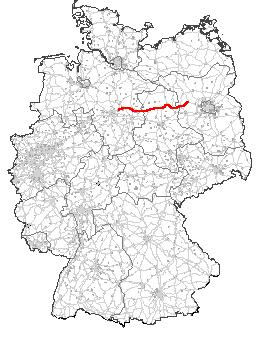

Route information
- Length: 214 km (133 mi)

Major junctions
- West end: B3
- East end: B5

Location
- Country: Germany
- States: Lower Saxony, Saxony-Anhalt, Brandenburg

Highway system
- Roads in Germany; Autobahns; List; Federal; List; State; E-roads

The Bundesstraße 188 or B 188 is one of the longer German federal highways crossing northern Germany. It connects the B3 with the B5.
