= Bundesstraße 3 =

Federal highway in Germany

B 3
- Bundesstraße 3

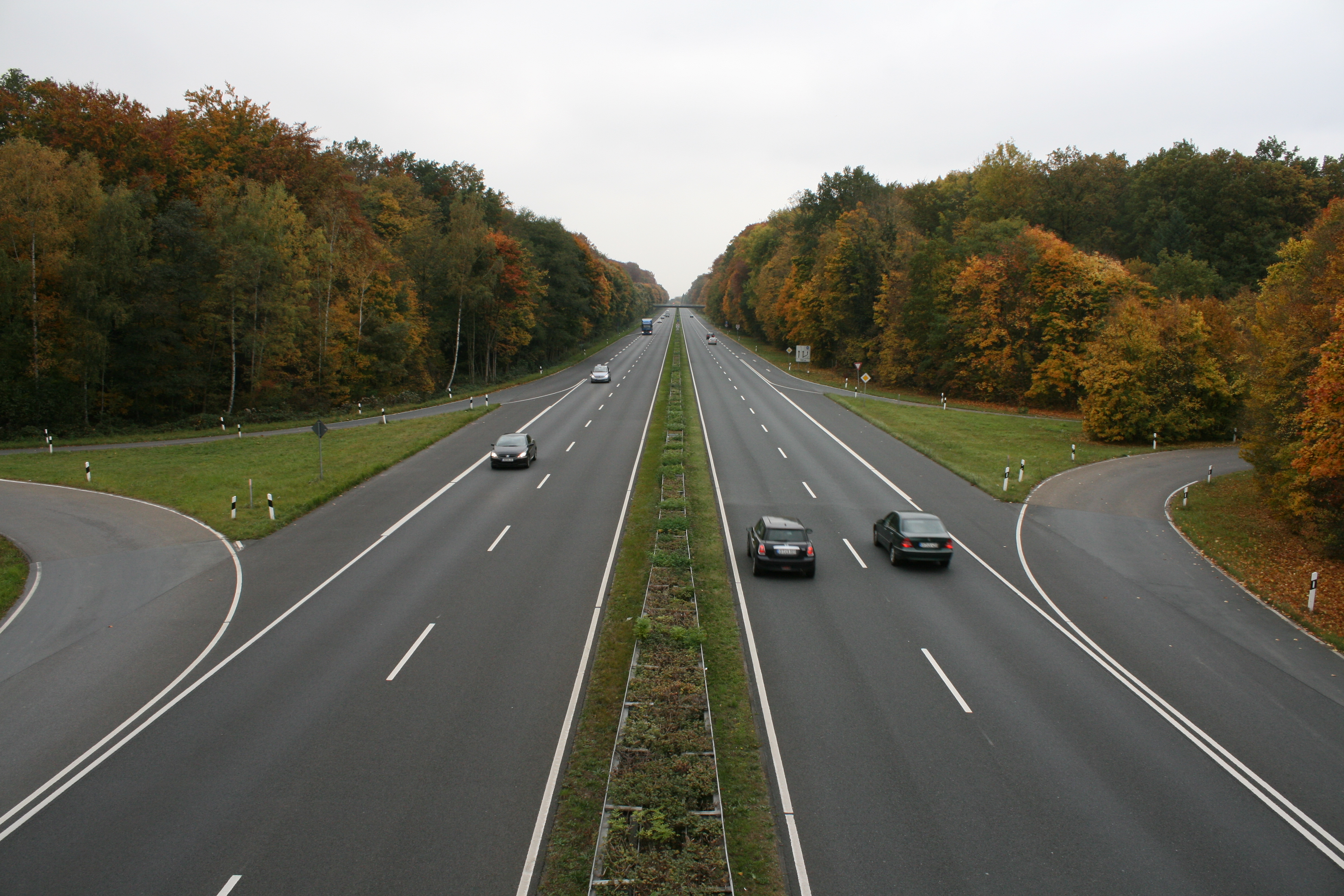

Route information
- Length: 755 km (469 mi)

Location
- Country: Germany
- States: Hamburg, Lower Saxony, Hesse, Baden-Württemberg

Highway system
- Roads in Germany; Autobahns; List; Federal; List; State; E-roads

The Bundesstraße 3 (abbr. B3) is one of the longest federal highways in Germany. It begins in Buxtehude and continues through Bergen, Celle, Hanover, Alfeld, Einbeck, Göttingen, Kassel, Marburg, Frankfurt, Darmstadt, Heidelberg, Karlsruhe and Freiburg in southwestern Germany and ends at Weil-Otterbach on the border with Switzerland. Between Darmstadt and Wiesloch it is referred to as Ferienstraße Bergstraße.

== Figures ==
- Bundesländer: Hamburg, Lower Saxony, Hesse, Baden-Württemberg
- Length: 755 km (469 miles)

== History ==
=== Origins ===
The Bundesstraße 3 is the latest incarnation of a trade route that has been in use since the Middle Ages. The stretch between Frankfurt and Heidelberg belonged to the Archbishop of Mainz until 1461. Thereafter it was a part of the Electorate of the Palatinate until 1651. In 1661 the Archbishop of Mainz and Hesse-Darmstadt agreed to divide the toll revenue: the Archbishophric controlled the road between Frankfurt and Heppenheim when the Frankfurt Fair took place, and Hesse-Darmstadt controlled the route at all other times.

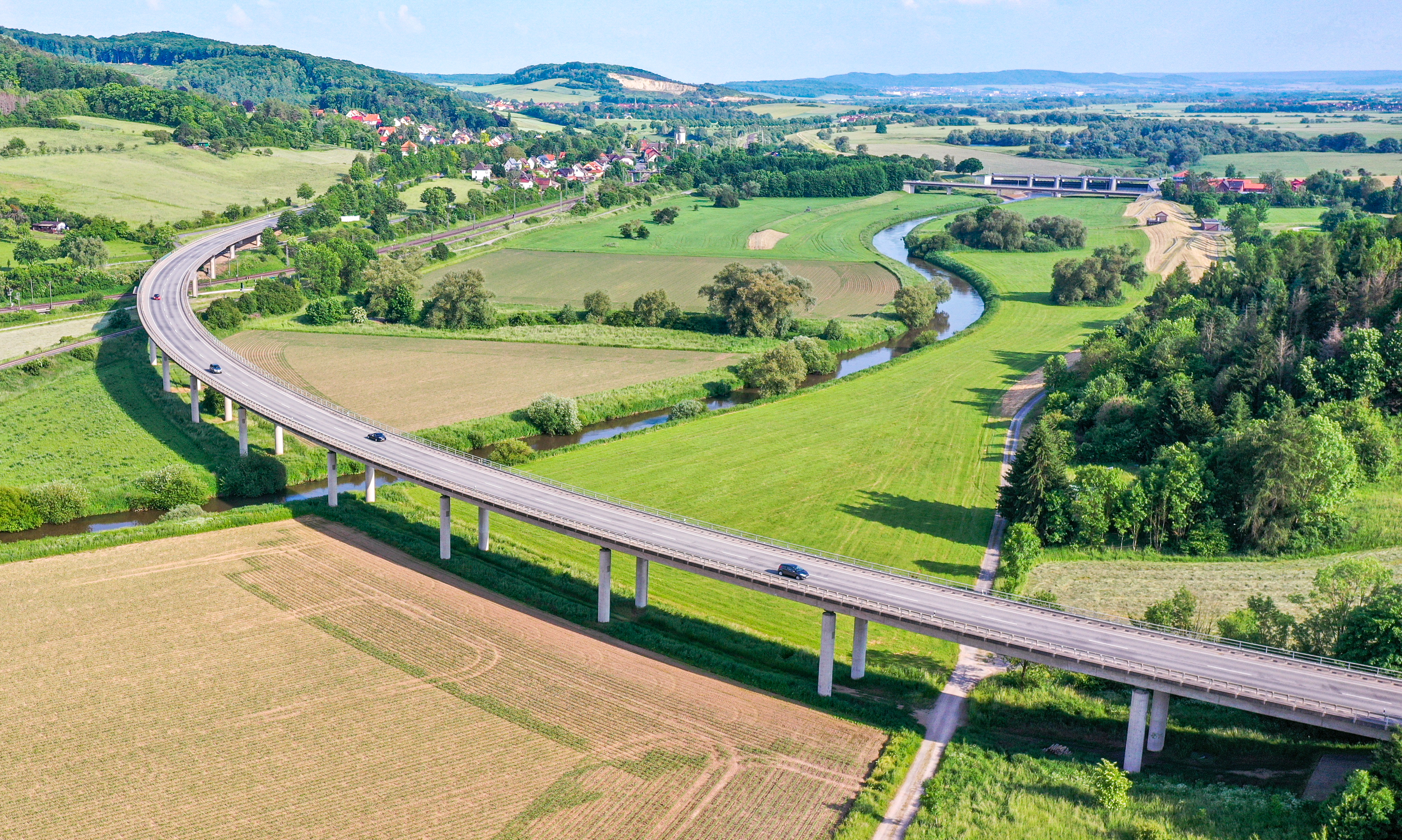
Bridge over the Leine river at Salzderhelden near Einbeck.

=== Construction of the modern road in the 18th century ===
Because of its importance to trade, in 1759 the portions immediately north and south of Heidelberg were turned into fixed roads. As the local compulsory laborers did not have the skills necessary for the construction of a high quality road, skilled road workers and engineers were recruited from Allgäu to finish the project in 1763. By 1771 the portion around Freiburg im Breisgau was also completed.

In the northern portion between Hanover and Göttingen, the second oldest road in northern Germany replaced the old dirt path in 1768 (the present-day B 217 between Hannover and Hameln already had opened two years previously as first road in Northern Germany). A decade later (1777) the stretch between Göttingen and Kassel was likewise modernised.

=== Earlier sections and designations ===
The road from Frankfurt to Basel was designated as Badische Staatsstraße (National Road) No 1.

In the early numbering system of 1932, the Reichsstraße 3 continued in what is today the stretch between Hamburg and Lübeck. This northern segment became a part of the extended Reichsstraße 75 in 1937.

== Characteristics ==
While in the north the B 3 is straight and at times, namely between Celle and Hanover, built like an autobahn, south of Hanover it becomes narrower and more curvy.

Between Göttingen and Kassel the B 3 features numerous curves, as it passes though the central German landscape.

Although the stretch from Borken to Marburg is particularly irregular, it is frequently used by tractor trailers from the direction of Frankfurt that want to bypass the mountains and hills around Kassel. From Marburg to Gießen the B 3 is again built like an autobahn.

== See also ==
- Bundesstraße
- List of federal highways in Germany
