= Heimburg =

- Stadtteil of Blankenburg am Harz
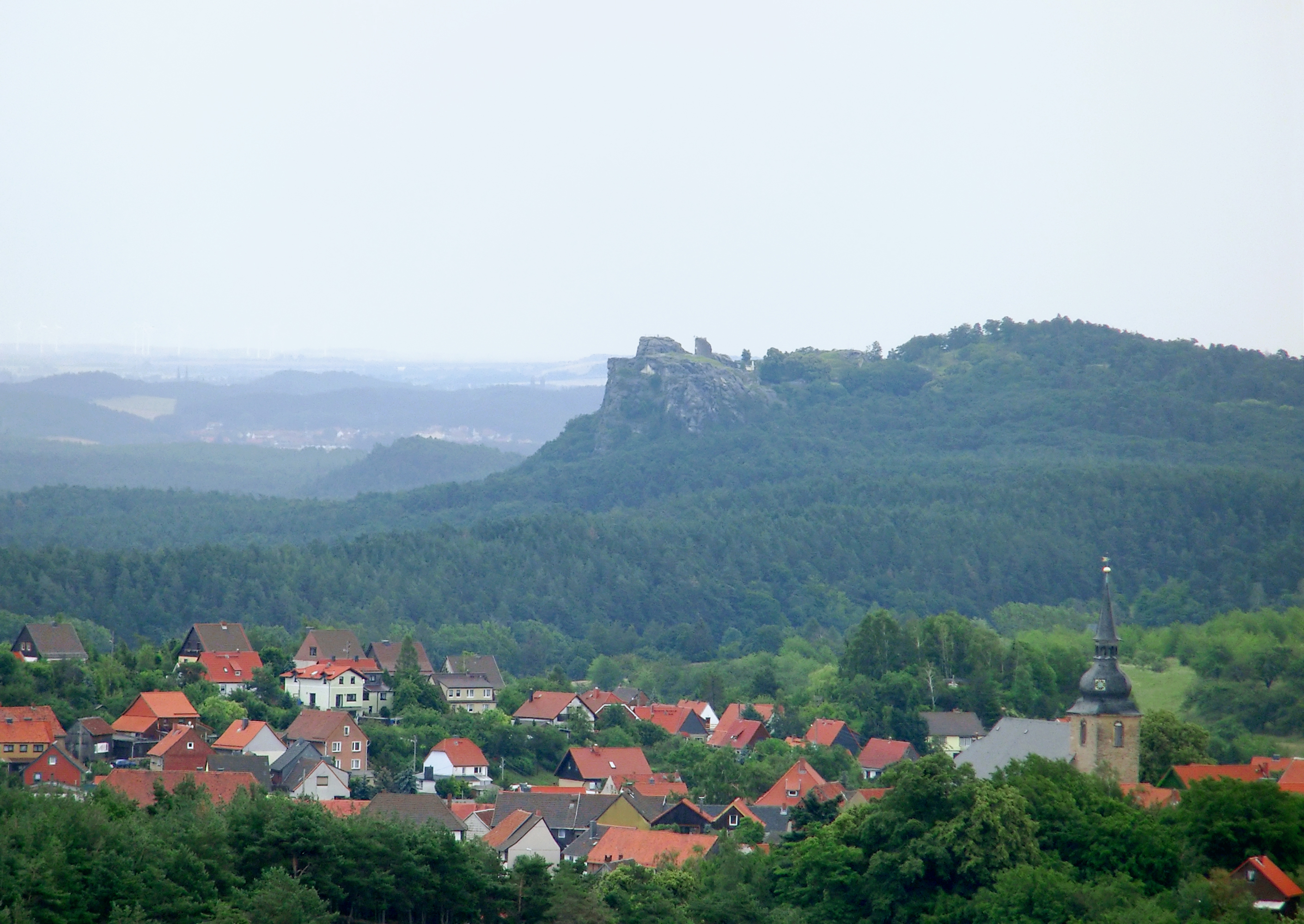

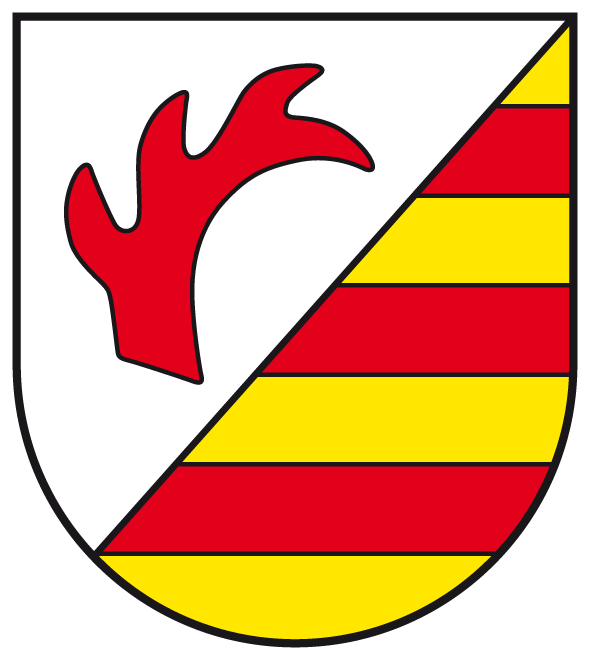
- Coat of arms
- Interactive map of Heimburg
- Location within Germany Location within Saxony-Anhalt
- Coordinates: 51°49′20″N 10°54′40″E
- Country: Germany
- State: Saxony-Anhalt
- District: Harz
- Town: Blankenburg am Harz

Area
  - Total: 19.62 km^{2} (7.58 sq mi)
- Elevation: 223 m (732 ft)

Population (2006-12-31)
  - Total: 929
  - Density: 47.3/km^{2} (123/sq mi)
- Time zone: UTC+01:00 (CET)
  - Summer (DST): UTC+02:00 (CEST)
- Postal codes: 38889
- Dialling codes: 03944
- Vehicle registration: HZ
- Website: www.heimburg-harz.de

Heimburg is a village and a former municipality in the district of Harz, in Saxony-Anhalt, Germany.

Since 1 January 2010, it is part of the town Blankenburg am Harz.

On a hilltop above the village are the ruins of the old Heimburg Castle which, today, is a good viewing point. Heimburg also lies at the foot of the Ziegenberge, a chain of small hills that have been designated as a nature reserve and run as far as Benzingerode. There are good views from the crest over the Harz Foreland.
