= Bundesautobahn 2 =

Autobahn in Germany connecting the Ruhr and Berlin

A 2
- Bundesautobahn 2

Route information
- Part of E30 and E34
- Length: 486 km (302 mi)

Major junctions
- West end: Oberhausen
- East end: Berlin

Location
- Country: Germany
- States: North Rhine-Westphalia, Lower Saxony, Saxony-Anhalt, Brandenburg

Highway system
- Roads in Germany; Autobahns; List; Federal; List; State; E-roads
← A 1	→ A 3

Bundesautobahn 2 (translates from German as Federal Motorway 2, short form Autobahn 2, abbreviated as BAB 2 or A 2) is an autobahn in Germany that connects the Ruhr area in the west to Berlin in the east. The A 2 starts at the junction with the A3 near the western city of Oberhausen, passes along the north side of the Ruhr valley, through the Münsterland and into Ostwestfalen, crossing the former inner German border and continuing through the Magdeburger Börde to merge into the Berliner Ring shortly before reaching Berlin. Major cities such as Magdeburg, Braunschweig, Hannover and Dortmund are situated very close to the A 2. The A 2 is one of the most important autobahns, connecting several large industrial areas.

The A 2 was upgraded in the late 1990s and completely rebuilt in the former East Germany. Throughout its entire length the A 2 has 3 traffic lanes and a breakdown lane in each direction.

== History ==
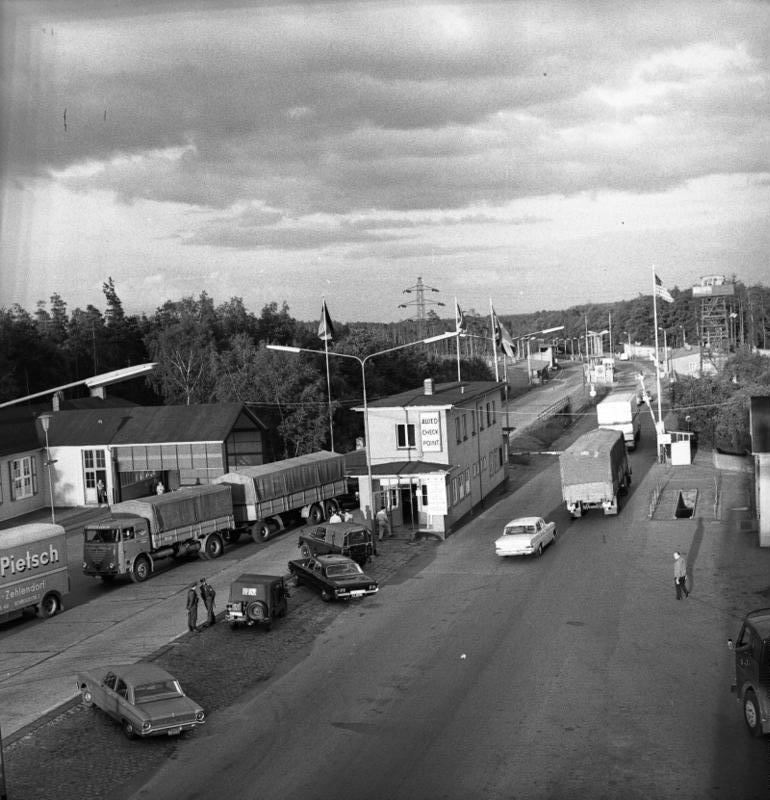
Border crossing at Helmstedt in 1967

The highway was planned between September 1933 and December 1934 by the construction departments of the Reichsautobahn company at their offices in Düsseldorf, Hanover and Magdeburg. As a connection artery for the Rhine-Ruhr region, the highway was deliberately planned to serve the northern Ruhr area, since the mining industry had migrated there and, in all events, the constructors wanted to avoid potential subsidence from old mine workings. In the East Westfalen area, the road hugged the existing settlements. At Hanover, it would have been natural for the motorway to pass a short distance to the south of the city. However, because Hanover at that time was a major German air hub and its airport lay to the north, the motorway was sited in order to serve the airport, besides which there was also a rail freight yard to the north, along with a planned industrial area, and the soil conditions were better. Between Berlin and Hanover three possible variants were examined. The northern route would have led via Stendal and to the north to the Berliner Ring. It was the shortest route for an extension that had been proposed towards Szczecin and Königsberg. However, the area it passed through was only sparsely populated and was already predominantly served by rail. The mid variant would serve Genthin and Brandenburg on the River Havel and would have brought traffic swiftly into the center of Berlin. Again, the area was sparsely populated and had already been developed by the railway. Further difficulty was posed by the numerous lakes and marshland, which would have made construction more difficult. It was the southern variant that was eventually built, which traversed the most densely populated area and opened up the possibility of an extension to Wroclaw or Frankfurt (on the Oder) and Warsaw. It was planned to build two 3.75-metre-wide (12.3 ft) lanes per direction of travel with a 4.2-metre-wide (14 ft) median strip along the entire route. With the concrete guide strips and shoulders, the construction covered a width of 24 metres (79 ft). With the exception of the section in the Teutoburg Forest, it was laid out to cater for speeds of up to 160 kilometres per hour (99 mph).

The construction was carried out simultaneously in a total of 12 locations. First, on 5 April 1936 the 32 kilometres (20 mi) section between Braunschweig-West and Lehrte was opened to traffic. Three further sections between Hannover-Ost and Lehrte (10 kilometres or 6.2 miles), Braunschweig-West and Helmstedt (43 kilometres or 27 miles) and Werder / Groß Kreutz (located at the subsequent part of today's A 10) to Burg / Schermen (85 kilometres or 53 miles) followed on 17 August 1936. On 10 January 1937 the Berlin Ring was connected to Hanover with the opening of the 55-kilometre-long (34 mi) section between Burg / Schermen and Helmstedt. On 17 December 1937, the first section between Düsseldorf and Recklinghausen was opened in the western area. The Kamener intersection north-east of Dortmund, where the A 1 crosses the A 2, came into use on 12 November 1938 together with the section between Recklinghausen and Gütersloh. The subsequent stretches of the current A 1 only came into operation in 1945. The Schkeuditzer intersection (between the A 9 and the A 14) was only the second cloverleaf to be constructed in Germany. It had also been planned to commission the section between Gütersloh and Bielefeld on that day in 1938, but that was delayed owing to a landslide in the Teutoburg Forest. Only once the debris had been removed could that portion be opened to traffic on 15 December. On the same day, the section to Bad Salzuflen and Herford was inaugurated, with the section between Bad Nenndorf and Hanover opening the day before. Thus, only the section between Bad Salzuflen and Bad Nenndorf was by then missing. It would open on 23 September 1939. At the outbreak of war only one carriageway had been completed. It was provisionally intended only for so-called service traffic. Using forced Polish laborers and prisoners of war, this section was built and opened by 14 November 1940, except for a 3-kilometre (1.9 mi) stretch of the Weser crossing at Bad Oeynhausen, which was built after the war. Altogether 230 bridges were built over the course of the highway.

In the GDR, the highway formed one of the transit routes from 1971 in the context of the transit agreement. On one travel and road map published by the GDR in 1979, the section of highway between the border crossing at Marienborn and the former Magdeburg branch (now the Werder exit) is marked only with a T, for transit route; on a later map (Reiseland DDR 1988) it is marked as E 30, which is one of its current designations to this day. It played an important role as a transit corridor to West Berlin, with allied checkpoints at both Helmstedt and Dreilinden-Drewitz (on the A 10). The Helmstedt Checkpoint was called Checkpoint Alpha for crossing the Inner-German Border, the Dreilinden-Drewitz checkpoint was named Checkpoint Bravo, for travel from East Germany into West Berlin

The federal numbering scheme mapped out at the beginning of the 1970s designated the road as the A 2 in the former West Germany, largely in line with the road's current number, but west of the Oberhausen intersection it became today's A 3 up to the Heumar exit, with mileages as from the Berliner Ring even being continued west all the way to Aachen. From the introduction of today's numbering system in 1975, the A 2 already began on the Dutch border at Straelen / Venlo and ran from the Kaiserberg intersection under the joint designation of A 2 and A 3 to the Oberhausen intersection, where the A 3 split off again and headed for Arnhem. In the course of numbering the junctions, which began in 1992, there were double denominations of motorway junctions and the route between Duisburg and Oberhausen was designated as the A 2 / A 3. The section between Venlo and Duisburg is nowadays part of the A 40.

Between the towns of Helmstedt and Marienborn can still be seen the old border control point, which was transformed into a museum in the 1990s. It is called Checkpoint Alpha.

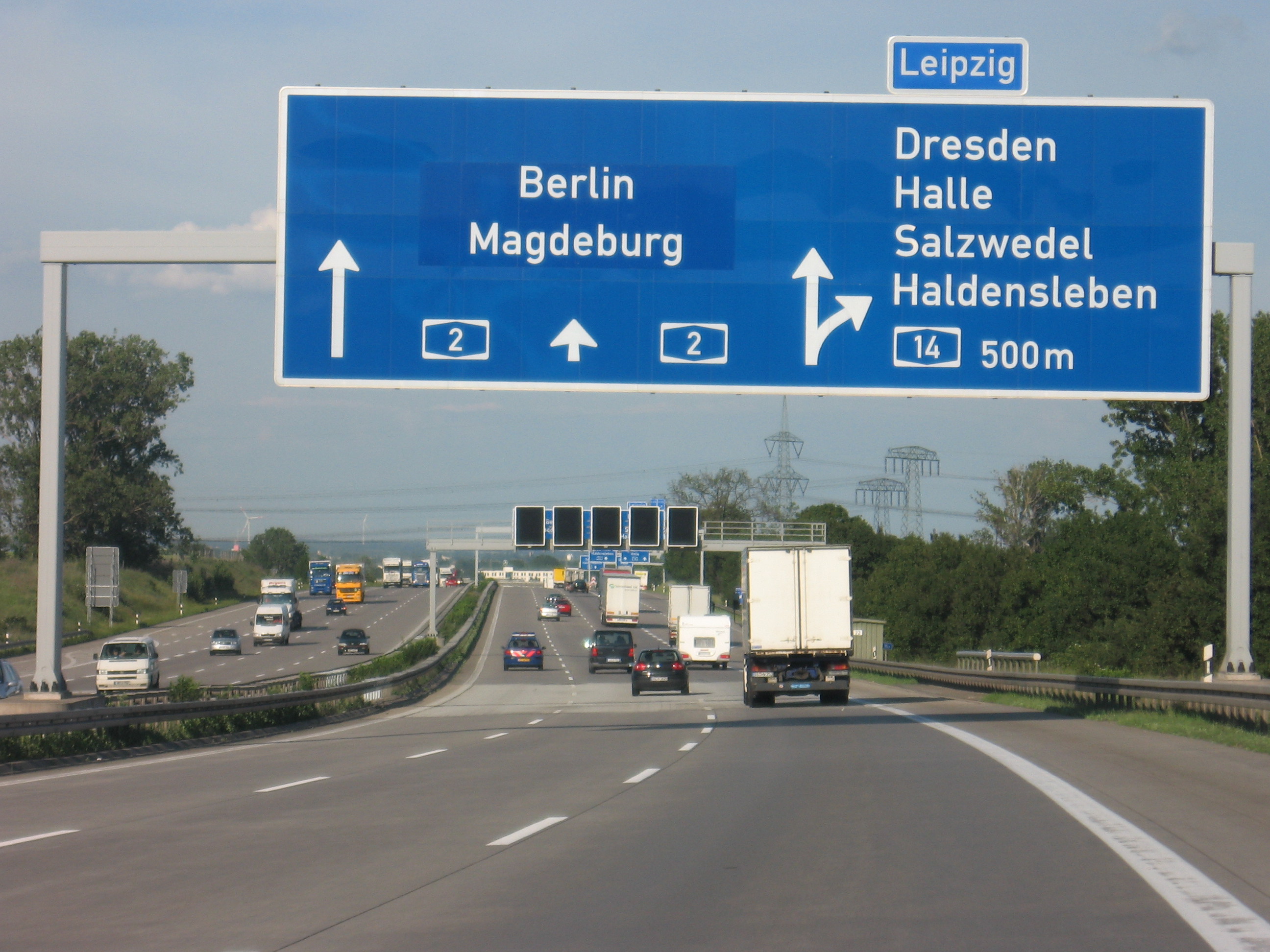
A 2 near Magdeburg

== Today ==
The Dortmund-Lanstrop exit only gives access to the nearby landfill. Garbage trucks approach it via the autobahn, then exit via secondary roads. The landfill is easily recognizable by the Lanstroper Ei, an old water tower standing on a hill approximately 400 metres (0.25 mi) away from the autobahn.

Due to its importance as a major thoroughfare for commercial transit and as a trade route connecting the western parts of Germany to neighbouring Central European countries such as Poland, it is often nicknamed Warsaw Avenue or simply the Poland Highway.

Christian Dzida, keyboardist for the Austrian band Schürzenjäger from 1995 to 1999, was killed in a road accident on Bundesautobahn 2 in November 2009.

== Future ==
The A 2 is completely six-lane between the Ruhr area and Berlin. The final un-widened section was completed in mid-December 2011. During the long widening period, traffic jams several kilometres long became a regular feature. Despite extensive safety measures, serious rear-end collisions involving trucks were a frequent occurrence.

At the end of October 2013, after 18 months of construction, the "Lipperland Nord" filling station and service facilities opened north of the Ostwestfalen / Lippe intersection. The services at Lipperland Süd had already been completed.

The states of Lower Saxony and North Rhine-Westphalia want to expand the busy A 2 from Bielefeld to the border with Saxony-Anhalt to eight lanes. In order to meet the expected increase in traffic, especially of trucks on this important east–west connection, both states have given notice of the expansion under the Federal Transport Infrastructure Plan 2030. However, the final version of the relevant plan, which came into force at the end of 2016 with an amendment to the Highways Act, now only includes an extension to the motorway triangle at Bottrop and Hannover-West, the Hannover-Buchholz exit and the eight-lane extension from Herrenhausen to AD Hannover-West, which is needed urgently to resolve frequent bottlenecks. Further needs include the eight-lane widening of the sections from Bad Nenndorf to Herrenhausen and Hannover-West to Hannover-East.

On the approximately 3.5-kilometre (2.2 mi) section between the Hannover-Ost interchange and Lehrte, the side strips were equipped with emergency bays, structurally adapted and marked out as "Verflechtungsstreifen" (weaving, or merging lanes) in blocks, on 28 January (in the direction of Berlin) and 1 February (in the opposite direction). Traffic is routed there using LED panels and supplementary variable messaging signs.
