= House of Regenstein =

Lower Saxon Noble Family

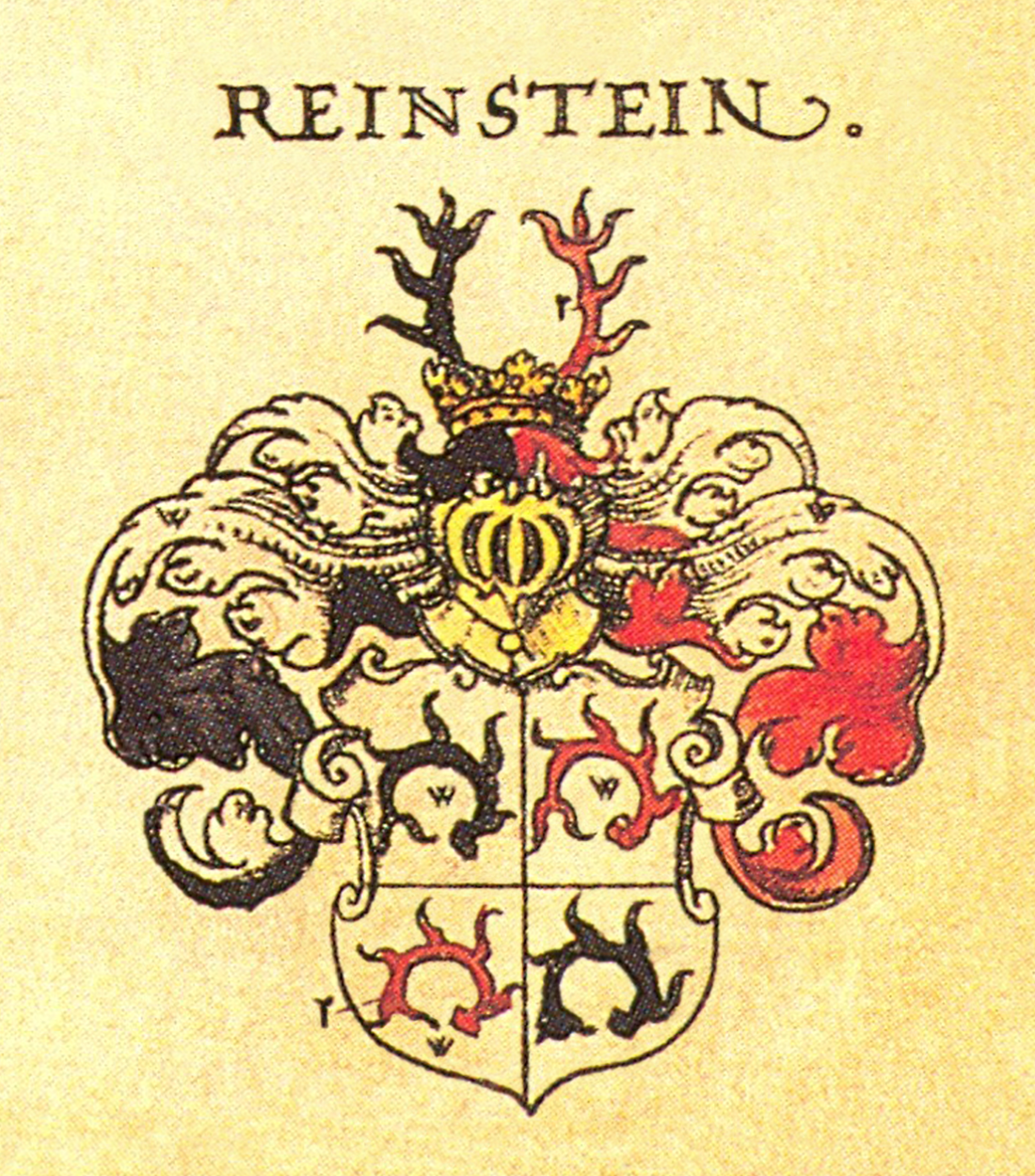
Coat of arms in Siebmacher’s Book of Heraldry

the Regenstein family, also Reinstein, was a Lower Saxon noble family, which was named after the eponymous Regenstein Castle near Blankenburg on the edge of the Harz Mountains of central Germany.

== History ==
In 1162 Cunradus Comes de Regenstein (Conrad, Count of Regenstein), the son of Count Poppo I of Blankenburg from the House of Reginbodonen, was documented for the first time by name, thus establishing the line of Reinstein-Blankenburg. Heimburg came into their possession in the 14th century as a fief and founded the Younger Line of Reinstein(-Heimburg). Regenstein Castle (the line of Reinstein-Reinstein) was abandoned in the mid-15th century in favour of Blankenburg and Derenburg. The last male descendant of the noble family, John Ernest, Count of Regenstein, died in 1599. Parts of the county evolved into the Principality of Blankenburg.

== Seats ==
- Regenstein Castle
- Westerburg Castle
- Heimburg Castle
- Roseburg Castle
- Calvörde Castle
- Oschersleben Castle
- Blankenburg Castle (Harz)

== Coat of arms ==
The coat of arms of the comital line displays in silver a (black) red, six-tined antler. The later quartered shield shows also in silver (1:4) a black and in (2:3) a red six-tined antler. Helmet: crowned, right a black six-tined antler, left a red one of the same. The mantle is black and silver on the right and red and silver on the left.

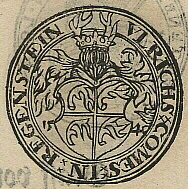
Reverse of a Regenstein taler

== Personalities ==
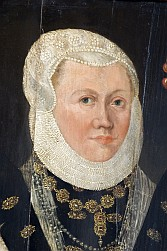
Portrait of Abbess Elizabeth

- Poppo I of Regenstein-Blankenburg, father of the line
- Richenza of Regenstein-Blankenburg (born around 1100; died before 1145), wife of Poppo I
- Reinhard of Blankenburg († 1123), Bishop of Halberstadt from 1107 to 1123
- Burchard II of Blankenburg († 1305), Archbishop of Magdeburg
- Albert II of Regenstein († 1349), Count of Regenstein
- Ulrich X of Regenstein-Blankenburg (1499–1551), count
- Elisabeth of Regenstein-Blankenburg (1542–1584), Abbess of Quedlinburg

== Sources ==
- Rudolf Steinhoff: Geschichte der Grafschaft bzw. des Fürstentums Blankenburg, Die Grafschaft Regenstein und des Klosters Michaelstein. Vieweg, 1891.
- Rudolf Steinhoff: Stammtafel Die Grafen von Regenstein und Blankenburg von ungefähr 1400 bis 1599. In: Zeitschrift des Harz-Vereins für Geschichte und Alterthumskunde, Bd. 25, Quedlinburg 1892, p. 146-167.
- Detlev Schwennicke: Europäische Stammtafeln: Hessen und das Stammesherzogtum Sachsen, Vol. 17 Stammtafeln zur Geschichte The europäischen Staaten. Verlag Vittorio Klostermann, 1998.
- Heinz A. Behrens; Hartmut Wegner: Das Ende einer Dynastie. Sonderausstellung aus Anlaß des 400. Todestages des Grafen Johann Ernst von Regenstein. Bussert, Jena, Quedlinburg 1999.
- Christof Römer: Die Grafen von Regenstein-Blankenburg als Stand des Reiches und des Niedersächsischen Reichskreises. In: Heinz A. Behrens (Hrsg.): Zwischen Herrschaftsanspruch und Schuldendienst. Beiträge zur Geschichte der Grafschaft Regenstein. Jena 2004, S. 73–90.
