= List of states in the Holy Roman Empire (R) =

This is a list of states in the Holy Roman Empire beginning with the letter R. Some historians mark the beginning of the Empire as 800, with the coronation of Frankish king Charlemagne ("Charles the Great").

Name	Type	Imperial circle	Imperial diet	History
Rabenswalde-Wiehe	County	n/a	n/a	1227: Partitioned from Käfernburg; 1255: Acquired Bucha; 1312: Extinct; to Weimar-Orlamünde-Weimar
Rantzau (Ranzau; Rantzow)	County	Low Sax	WE	1649: Christian Rantzau purchased part of Pinneberg from Holstein-Gottorp; 1650: Lower Saxon Circle; 1726: To Denmark
Rapperswil (Rapperschwyl)	Lordship; 1233: County	n/a	n/a	1099: First mentioned; branch of the Counts of Wandelburg; 1233: HRE Count; 1283: Extinct in male line; most seized by Austria; 1309: Remaining territory to Habsburg-Laufenburg by marriage 1352: City of Rapperswil to Austria (see below); 1353: Divided between Habsburg-Laufenburg-Neu-Rapperswil and Habsburg-Laufenburg-Alt-Rapperswil
Rapperswil (Rapperschwyl)	Imperial City	n/a	n/a	1229: City founded by Rapperswil; 1309: To Habsburg-Laufenburg; 1352: To Austria; 1415: Free Imperial City; 1442: To Austria; 1464: Protectorate of the Swiss Confederation; 1648: Left the Empire as part of Switzerland
Rappoltstein	Lordship; 1651: County		SW	942: First mentioned 1082: Made fief of the Bishopric of Worms; 1157: Extinct in male line; to Urslingen by marriage 1219: Urslingen assumed the name Rappoltstein; 1227: Sold Kaysersberg to the Emperor; 12??: Imperial immediacy 1293: Partitioned into Rappoltstein-Hohenack, Rappoltstein-Groß-Rappoltstein and Rappoltstein-Hohen-Rappoltstein; 1436: Reunited by Rappoltstein-Hohen-Rappoltstein; 1437: Acquired Hohenack; 1651: HRE Count; 1673: Extinct; to Palatinate-Zweibrücken-Birkenfeld-Bischweiler
Rappoltstein-Groß-Rappoltstein	Lordship	n/a	n/a	1293: Partitioned from Rappoltstein; 1338: Acquired Hohen-Rappoltstein; 1351: Acquired Hohenack; 1368: Partitioned into itself and Rappoltstein-Hohen-Rappoltstein; 1377: Extinct in male line 1400: Extinct; to Lupfen
Rappoltstein-Hohenack	Lordship	n/a	n/a	1293: Partitioned from Rappoltstein; 1351: Extinct; to Rappoltstein-Groß-Rappoltstein
Rappoltstein-Hohen-Rappoltstein	Lordship	n/a	n/a	1293: Partitioned from Rappoltstein; 1338: To Rappoltstein-Groß-Rappoltstein; 1341: Extinct; 1368: Partitioned from Rappolstein-Groß-Rappoltstein; 1419: Acquired Groß-Rappoltstein; 1436: Renamed to Rappoltstein
Ratzeburg	Prince-Bishopric	Low Sax	EC	c. 1050: Diocese established 1066: See destroyed in uprising 1154: Reestablished; 1236: HRE Prince of the Empire; Imperial immediacy 1648: Secularised as Principality for Mecklenburg-Schwerin
Ratzeburg	Principality	Low Sax	PR	1648: Ratzeburg secularised and given to Mecklenburg-Schwerin; 1701: To Mecklenburg-Strelitz
Ravensberg	1180: County	Low Rhen	n/a	1170: Renamed from Calvelage; fief of Saxony; 1180: Imperial immediacy 1226: Partitioned into Vechta and itself 1252: Vechta sold to Münster; 1346: Extinct; to Berg; 1437: To Jülich-Berg; 1521: To Jülich-Cleves-Berg; 1614: To Brandenburg; 1807: To Westphalia; 1814: To Prussia
Ravensburg	Imperial City	Swab	SW	1088: First mentioned; seat of the Welfs; 1191: To Hohenstaufen; 1268: To the Empire directly 1276: Free Imperial City; 1803: To Bavaria; 1810: To Württemberg
Ravenstein	Barony	n/a	n/a	1150: To Cuijk c. 1170: To Herpen; later superseded by Ravenstein and the local barons assumed the name Ravenstein; 1324: Extinct in male line; to Valkenburg by marriage 1396: To Salm; 1397: To Cleves-Marck; 1450: To Cleves-Ravenstein; 1528: To Jülich-Cleves-Berg; 1609: To the Netherlands; 1621: To Brandenburg; 1630: To Palatinate-Zweibrücken-Neuburg; 1695: To the Palatinate; 1794: To France; 1800: To the Batavian Republic; 1806: To Holland; 1810: To France; 1815: To the Netherlands
Rechberg	county		n/a	1179: First mentioned 13th Century: Partitioned into Rechberg auf den Bergen and Rechberg unter den Bergen
Rechberg auf den Bergen	Lordship	n/a	n/a	13th Century: Partitioned from Rechberg c. 1327: Partitioned into Rechberg-Staufeneck and Rechberg-Hohenrechberg
Rechberg-Babenhausen	Lordship	n/a	n/a	1432: Partitioned from Rechberg-Staufeneck; 1439: Acquired Mindelheim; 14??: 1467: Mindelheim sold to Frundsberg; 1507: Extinct; to Rechberg-Brandenburg
Rechberg-Brandenburg	Lordship	n/a	n/a	1460: Partitioned from Rechberg-Illereichen; 1481: Acquired Brandenburg an der Iller; 1507: Acquired Babenhausen; 1537: Extinct; to Rechberg-Kellmünz
Rechberg-Donzdorf	Lordship; 1601: Barony; 1699: County	n/a	n/a	1574: Partitioned from Rechberg-Illereichen; 1601: HRE Baron; 1605: Partitioned into itself and Rechberg-Hohenrechberg and Aichen; 1682: Acquired Ramsberg; 1699: HRE Count; 1732: Extinct; to Rechberg-Osterberg
Rechberg-Gammertingen	Lordship	n/a	n/a	1437: Partitioned from Rechberg-Hohenrechberg; 1449: Formed Lordship of Schramberg; 1459: Henry acquired Schwarzenberg; formed line Rechberg-Schwarzenberg; 1526: Sold Lordship of Schramberg to Landenberg c. 1570: Extinct
Rechberg-Heuchlingen	Lordship	n/a	n/a	1540: Partitioned from Rechberg-Hohenrechberg; 1573: Inherited Rechberg-Hohenrechberg and assumed that name
Rechberg-Hohenrechberg	Lordship	n/a	n/a	c. 1327: Partitioned from Rechberg auf den Bergen; 1374: Acquired Rechberghausen; 1437: Partitioned into Rechberg-Weißenstein, itself and Rechberg-Gammertingen; 1540: Partitioned into itself and Rechberg-Heuchlingen; 1573: Inherited by Rechberg-Heuchlingen; 1585: Extinct; to Rechberg-Staufeneck
Rechberg-Hohenrechberg and Aichen	Barony; 1626: County	n/a	n/a	1605: Partitioned from Rechberg-Donzdorf; 1626: HRE Count; 1676: Extinct in male line 1677: To Limburg-Styrum-Illereichen by marriage
Rechberg-Illereichen	Lordship; 1601: Barony	n/a	n/a	1351: Partitioned from Rechberg-Staufeneck; 1430: Partitioned into itself and Rechberg-Scharfenberg; 1460: Partitioned into itself, Rechberg-Kronburg and Rechberg-Brandenburg; 1568: Acquired Donzdorf; 1574: Partitioned into itself, Rechberg-Rechberghausen and Rechberg-Donzdorf; 1601: HRE Baron; 1619: Extinct; to Rechberg-Hohenrechberg and Aichen
Rechberg-Kellmünz	Lordship	n/a	n/a	1506: Partitioned from Rechberg-Kronburg; 1539: Sold Babenhausen to Fugger; 1573: To Rechberg-Kronberg; 1578: Extinct
Rechberg-Kronburg	Lordship; 1577: Barony	n/a	n/a	1460: Partitioned from Rechberg-Illereichen; 1506: Partitioned into itself and Rechberg-Kellmünz; 1540: Partitioned into itself, Rechberg-Türkheim-Schwabeck and Rechberg-Osterberg; 1573: Acquired Kellmünz; 1577: HRE Baron; 1604: Extinct; to Westernach
Rechberg-Osterberg	Lordship; 1601: Barony; 1810: County	n/a	n/a	1540: Partitioned from Rechberg-Kronburg; 1601: HRE Baron; 16??: Partitioned into Rechberg-Weißenstein and itself 1806: To Württemberg; 1810: To Bavaria; Raised to County and assumed the name Rechberg and Rothenlöwen
Rechberg-Ramsberg	Lordship	n/a	n/a	1468: Partitioned from Rechberg-Scharfenberg; 1529: Extinct; to Pappenheim-Rothenstein
Rechberg-Rechberghausen	Lordship	n/a	n/a	1574: Partitioned from Rechberg-Illereichen; 1596: Partitioned into Rechberg-Rechberghausen-Unterwaldstetten and Rechberg-Rechberghausen-Rechberghausen
Rechberg-Rechberghausen-Rechberghausen	Lordship; 1642: Barony	n/a	n/a	1596: Partitioned from Rechberg-Rechberghausen; 1642: HRE Baron; 1672: Sold Unterwaldstetten to Grafeneck-Eglingen; 1677: Extinct; to Rechberg-Donzdorf
Rechberg-Rechberghausen-Unterwaldstetten	Lordship	n/a	n/a	1596: Partitioned from Rechberg-Rechberghausen; 1640: Extinct; to Rechberg-Rechberghausen-Rechberghausen
Rechberg-Schwabeck	Lordship; 1598: Barony	n/a	n/a	1596: Partitioned from Rechberg-Türkheim-Schwabeck; 1598: HRE Baron; 1620: Extinct; to Rechberg-Osterberg
Rechberg-Scharfenberg	Lordship	n/a	n/a	1430: Partitioned from Rechberg-Illereichen; 1468: Partitioned into Rechberg-Ramsberg and itself 1547: Extinct; to Rechberg-Illereichen
Rechberg-Schwarzenberg	Lordship	n/a	n/a	1459: Established when Henry of Rechberg-Gammertingen acquired Schwarzenberg through marriage 1542: Extinct; to Ehingen
Rechberg-Staufeneck	Lordship	n/a	n/a	c. 1327: Partitioned from Rechberg auf den Bergen; 1330: Acquired Illereichen; 1351: Partitioned into itself and Rechberg-Illereichen; 1432: Partitioned into Rechberg-Babenhausen and itself 1599: Extinct; divided between Getrude von Schutzbar and Württemberg; 1601: Hohenrechberg sold to Rechberg-Donzdorf; 1604: All to Getrude von Schutzbar; 1623: Sold to Württemberg
Rechberg-Türkheim-Schwabeck	Lordship	n/a	n/a	1540: Partitioned from Rechberg-Kronburg; 1597: Partitioned into Rechberg-Schwabeck and Rechberg-Weißenstein
Rechberg unter den Bergen	Lordship	n/a	n/a	13th Century: Partitioned from Rechberg; 1316: Acquired Sindelfingen and Kellmünz; 1351: Sindelfingen sold to Württemberg-Urach and Württemberg-Stuttgart; 1366: Heuchlingen and Rechberghausen sold to Austria; 1413: Extinct; to Rechberg-Hohenrechberg
Rechberg-Weißenstein	Lordship	n/a	n/a	1437: Partitioned from Rechberg-Hohenrechberg; 1443: Acquired Krautheim and Ballenberg as fief of Mainz; 1550: Extinct; to Rechberg-Kronburg
Rechberg-Weißenstein	Lordship; 1597: Barony; 1607: County	n/a	n/a	1596: Partitioned from Rechberg-Türkheim-Schwabeck; 1597: HRE Baron; 1607: HRE Count; 1618: Extinct; to Rechberg-Schwabeck
Rechberg-Weißenstein	Barony	n/a	n/a	16??: Partitioned from Rechberg-Osterberg; 1738: Extinct; to Rechberg-Osterberg
Rechteren-Limpurg-Speckfeld	County	Franc	FR	1713: Renamed from Rechteren when inherited a portion of Limpurg; 1806: To Württemberg
Reckheim; See: Rekem				
Regensburg (Ratisbon)	Bishopric	Bav	EC	739: Formed; 13th Century: HRE Prince of the Empire; 1803: Merged with other territories to form Archbishopric (see below)
Regensburg (Ratisbon)	Electoral Archbishopric	Bav	EC	1803: Mainz, Regensburg and other territories combined for Karl Theodor von Dalberg; 1810: To Bavaria; Karl Theodor von Dalberg obtained Frankfurt
Regensburg (Ratisbon)	Imperial City	Bav	SW	1245: Free Imperial City; 1803: To Archbishopric of Regensburg; 1810: To Bavaria
Regenstein (Reinstein)	County	n/a	n/a	1162: Partitioned from Blankenburg; fief of Saxony; 1180: Fief of Halberstadt; 1202: Fief of Brunswick and Lüneburg; 1224: Partitioned into Regenstein Elder Line and Regenstein Younger Line
Regenstein (Reinstein)	County	n/a	n/a	1599: To Halberstadt; 1644: To Tannenbach as fief of Halberstadt; 1671: To Halberstadt; 1807: To Westphalia; 1815: To Prussia
Regenstein-Blankenburg	County	n/a	n/a	1368: Formed by Regenstein-Hainburg after acquiring Blankenburg; 1599: Extinct; to Halberstadt; See: Blankenburg and Regenstein
Regenstein Elder Line	County	n/a	n/a	1224: Partitioned from Regenstein; fief of Brunswick and Lüneburg; 1328: Extinct; to Regenstein-Regenstein
Regenstein-Hainburg	County	n/a	n/a	1248: Partitioned from Regenstein Younger Line; fief of Brunswick and Lüneburg; 1344: Fief of Halberstadt; 1366: Acquired Regenstein; 1368: Acquired Blankenburg; renamed to Regenstein-Blankenburg
Regenstein-Regenstein	County	n/a	n/a	1248: Partitioned from Regenstein Younger Line; fief of Brunswick and Lüneburg; 1344: Fief of Halberstadt; 1366: Extinct; to Regenstein-Hainburg
Regenstein Younger Line	County	n/a	n/a	1224: Partitioned from Regenstein; fief of Brunswick and Lüneburg; 1248: Partitioned into Regenstein-Regenstein and Regenstein-Hainburg
Reichelsberg (Reichsberg; Reichelsburg)	Lordship; County	Franc	n/a	1230: First mentioned; property of Brauneck as fief of Bamberg; 1249: To Brauneck-Brauneck as fief of Bamberg; 1390: To Würzburg; 1401: To Weinsberg; 1516: To Königstein; 1521: To Würzburg; 1671: To Schönborn; 1806: To Bavaria
Reichenau	Abbacy	Swab	SP	724 ????: Imperial immediacy 1540: To the Bishopric of Constance; 1803: Secularised; to Baden
Reichenstein	Lordship	Low Rhen	WE	1332: Lordship established by Waldbott von Neuerburg; 1506: Waldbott von Neuerburg extinct; to Sombreffe; 1523: To Wied; 1698: To Nesselrode-Reichenstein; 1702: Bench of Westphalian Counts; 1776: To Nesselrode-Landskron; 1806: To Berg; 1815: To Prussia
Reichenweier (Riquewihr)	Lordship	n/a	n/a	1049: First mentioned; to Egisheim-Dagsburg; 1269: To Horburg; 1324: To Württemberg; 1680: Left the Empire as part of France; 1796: To France directly
Reifferscheid (Reifferscheidt)	Lordship	n/a	n/a	12th Century: First mentioned c. 1195: Partitioned into itself and Wildenburg; 1273: Acquired Malberg; side line established 1354: Acquired Bedburg; 1366: Partitioned into Reifferscheid-Gladbach and Reifferscheid-Bedburg
Reifferscheid-Bedburg	Lordship	n/a	n/a	1366: Partitioned from Reifferscheid; 1394–5: Acquired Dyck; 1460: Acquired Salm in the Ardennes; renamed to Salm-Reifferscheid
Reifferscheid-Gladbach	Lordship	n/a	n/a	1366: Partitioned from Reifferscheid; 1426: Extinct
Reipoltskirchen	Lordship	Upp Rhen	WE	1198: First mentioned 1276: To Hohenfels; 1277: To Hohenfels-Reipoltskirchen; 1602: Extinct; divided and shared between numerous families 1793: To France; 1815: To Bavaria
Rekem (Reckheim)	Lordship; 1356: Barony; 1623: County	Low Rhen	WE	1108: First mentioned 1140: Extinct; to Bronchhorst; 1317: To Mark-Rekem; 1335: To Stein; 1356: HRE Baron; 1397: To Sombreffe; 1501: To Pirmont; 1514: To Mark-Arenberg; 1545: To Hennin; 1553: To Vlodrop; 1564: To Quadt-Wickrath; 1590: To Aspremont-Lynden; 1623: HRE Count; Joined the Westphalian Counts; 1795: To France; 1815: To the Netherlands; 1830: To Belgium
Remiremont	Abbacy	n/a	n/a	620: Formed; 1070: Imperial immediacy 1290: HRE Princess of the Empire; 1566: To Lorraine; 1790: Secularised to France
Retersbeck (Reitersbach)	Lordship	n/a	n/a	1290: First mentioned 1410: Inherited Schaesberg; took the name Retersbeck von Schaesberg and shortly after Schaesberg
Reuss (Reuß); House began at Reuss-Plauen; branch of Weida				
Reuss-Burgk	Advocacy (Vogtei); 1673: County	Upp Sax	WT	1583: Partitioned from Reuss-Unter-Greiz; 1616: Partitioned into itself and Reuss-Dölau; 1640: Extinct; Burgk to Reuss-Unter-Greiz, Dölau to Reuss-Ober-Greiz; 1668: Partitioned from Reuss-Unter-Greiz; 1673: HRE Count; 1697: Extinct; to Reuss-Unter-Greiz
Reuss-Dölau	Advocacy (Vogtei); 1694: County	Upp Sax	WT	1616: Partitioned from Reuss-Burgk; 1636: Extinct; to Reuss-Burgk; 1694: Partitioned from Reuss-Ober-Greiz; 1698: Extinct; to Reuss-Ober-Greiz
Reuss-Ebersdorf	County; 1806: Principality	Upp Sax	WT	1678: Partitioned from Reuss-Lobenstein; 1806: HRE Prince
Reuss Elder Line	Principality	Upp Sax	WT / PR	1778: Renamed from Reuss-Greiz; HRE Prince; 1803: Bench of Princes; After May 1778: First-ever appearance of the black-red-gold tricolour flag in its modern arrangement in any sovereign state within what today comprises Germany
Reuss-Gera (Reuss Younger Line)	Advocacy (Vogtei); 1673: County	Upp Sax	WT	1564: Partitioned from Reuss-Greiz; 1647: Partitioned into itself, Reuss-Saalburg, Reuss-Schleiz and Reuss-Lobenstein; 1666: Acquired Saalburg; 1673: HRE Count; 1802: Extinct; joint rule by Reuss-Schleiz, Reuss-Lobenstein and Reuss-Ebersdorf
Reuss-Greiz	Advocacy (Vogtei); 1768: County	Upp Sax	WT	1359: Partitioned from Reuss-Plauen; 1368: Partitioned into Reuss-Greiz Hinterschloss and Reuss-Greiz Vorderschloss; 1462: Reunited by Reuss-Greiz Hinterschloss; 1485: Partitioned into itself and Reuss-Kranichfeld; 1564: Partitioned into Reuss-Unter-Greiz, Reuss-Ober-Greiz and Reuss-Gera; 1768: Renamed from Reuss-Ober-Greiz; 1778: Renamed to Reuss Elder Line
Reuss-Greiz Hinterschloss	Advocacy (Vogtei)	n/a	n/a	1368: Partitioned from Reuss-Plauen; 1394: Sold half of Wiesenburg to Meissen; 1449: Extinct; to Henry VIII of Reuss-Greiz Vorderschloss; 1462: Renamed to Reuss-Greiz
Reuss-Greiz Vorderschloss	Advocacy (Vogtei)	n/a	n/a	1368: Partitioned from Reuss-Plauen; 1449: To Henry X 1451: Acquired Kranichfeld; 1462: Extinct; to Reuss-Greiz Hinterschloss
Reuss-Hirschberg	County	Upp Sax	WT	1678: Partitioned from Reuss-Lobenstein; 1711: Extinct; divided between Reuss-Lobenstein and Reuss-Ebersdorf
Reuss-Köstritz	County; 1806: Principality	n/a	n/a	1692: Appanage created within Reuss-Schleiz; 1806: HRE Prince
Reuss-Kranichfeld	Advocacy (Vogtei)	Upp Sax	WT	1485: Partitioned from Reuss-Greiz; 1497: Acquired Schauenforst; 1529: Extinct; to Reuss-Greiz
Reuss-Lobenstein	Advocacy (Vogtei); 1673: County; 1806: Principality	Upp Sax	WT	1647: Partitioned from Reuss-Gera; 1664: Acquired Hirschberg; 1673: HRE Count; 1678: Partitioned into itself, Reuss-Hirschberg and Reuss-Ebersdorf; 1718: Side line Reuss-Selbitz founded 1805: Inherited by Reuss-Selbitz; 1806: HRE Prince
Reuss-Ober-Greiz (Reuss Intermediate Line)	Advocacy (Vogtei)	Upp Sax	WT	1564: Partitioned from Reuss-Greiz; 1577: Acquired Lobenstein; 1588: Sold Lobenstein to Reuss-Gera; 1590: Acquired Schleiz, Saalburg and Burgk; 1616: Extinct; Ober-Greiz to Reuss-Unter-Greiz, Schleiz to Reuss-Gera
Reuss-Ober-Greiz	Advocacy (Vogtei); 1673: County	Upp Sax	WT	1625: Partitioned from Reuss-Unter-Greiz; 1673: HRE Count; 1694: Partitioned into itself and Reuss-Dölau; 1768: Renamed to Reuss-Greiz
Reuss-Plauen (Reuß von Plauen)	Advocacy (Vogtei)	n/a	n/a	1309: Name adopted by Plauen Younger Line; branch of Weida; 1359: Partitioned into Reuss-Greiz and Reuss-Ronneburg
Reuss-Ronneburg	Advocacy (Vogtei)	n/a	n/a	1359: Partitioned from Reuss-Plauen; 1384: Acquired Schmölln; 1398: Extinct; to Reuss-Greiz
Reuss-Rothenthal	Advocacy (Vogtei); 1673: County	Upp Sax	WT	1668: Partitioned from Reuss-Unter-Greiz; 1673: HRE Count; 1698: Extinct; to Reuss-Unter-Greiz
Reuss-Saalburg	Advocacy (Vogtei)	Upp Sax	WT	1647: Partitioned from Reuss-Gera; 1666: Saalburg to Reuss-Gera; formed Reuss-Schleiz
Reuss-Schleiz	Advocacy (Vogtei); 1673: County; 1806: Principality	Upp Sax	WT	1647: Partitioned from Reuss-Gera; 1666: Extinct; inherited by Reuss-Saalburg; 1673: HRE Count; 1692: Appanage Reuss-Köstritz created 1806: HRE Prince
Reuss-Selbitz	Advocacy (Vogtei); 1673: County	Upp Sax	WT	1718: Formed when Henry XXVI of Reuss-Lobenstein acquired Selbitz by marriage 1805: Inherited Reuss-Lobenstein
Reuss-Unter-Greiz (Reuss Elder Line)	Advocacy (Vogtei); 1673: County	Upp Sax	WT	1564: Partitioned from Reuss-Greiz; 1583: Partitioned into Reuss-Burgk and itself 1616: Acquired Ober-Greiz; 1625: Partitioned into Reuss-Ober-Greiz and itself 1668: Partitioned into Reuss-Burgk, itself and Reuss-Rothenthal; 1673: HRE Count; 1768: Extinct; to Reuss-Ober-Greiz
Reutlingen	Imperial City	Swab	SW	1240: Free Imperial City; 1803: To Württemberg
Rheda	Lordship	n/a	n/a	1170: First mentioned 1190: Extinct; to Lippe; 1344: To Lippe-Rheda; 1365: To Tecklenburg; 1562: To Bentheim-Steinfurt; 1605: To Bentheim-Tecklenburg-Rheda; 1808: To Berg; 1815: To Prussia
Rheineck	Burgraviate	El Rhin	WE	11th Century: first mentioned; to a branch of Salm; 1155: Extinct; to Cologne; 1180: To Ulmen as fief of Cologne; 1539: To Metternich-Brohl as fief of Cologne; 1556: To Metternich-Schweppenburg as fief of Cologne; 1571: To Warsberg; 1654: To Sinzendorf-Ernstbrunn; 1796: To France; 1815: To Prussia
Rheinfelden	County	n/a	n/a	10th Century: Formed; 1090: Extinct; to Zähringen; 1218: To the Emperor directly; city immediate (see below)
Rheinfelden	Imperial City	n/a	n/a	1218: Free Imperial City; 1253: To Basel; 1279: Free Imperial City; 1330: To Austria; 1415: Free Imperial City; 1439: To Austria; 1467: To Burgundy; 1477: To Austria; 1638: To Sweden; 1647: To France; 1650: To Austria; 1799: Left bank to France; 1803: Left bank to Fricktal, canton of the Helvetic Republic. Right bank to Breisgau-Modena; 1805: Right bank to Baden
Rheingrafschaft; See: Rhinegraviate				
Rheintal	Lordship / Bailiwick	n/a	n/a	1348: Formed by Werdenberg; 1395: To Austria; 1405: To Appenzell; 1424: to Toggenburg; 1464: Condominium of the Swiss Confederation; 1648: Left the Empire as part of Switzerland
Rhinegraviate (Rheingau; Rheingrafschaft)	Rhinegraviate	n/a	n/a	1019: Rheingau invested upon the Embrichonids; fiefs of Mainz; 1170: Imperial immediacy 1194: Half to Stein; 1223: Extinct; all to Stein
Riedesel zu Eisenbach	Lordship; 1684: Barony	n/a	n/a	1428: Riedesel acquired Eisenbach and Lauterbach as fief of Fulda; 1684: Imperial immediacy; HRE Baron; 1806: To the Grand Duchy of Hesse (Hesse-Darmstadt)
Rieneck	County	n/a	n/a	11th Century: First mentioned 1101: Extinct in male line 1108: To Loon by marriage c. 1195: Partitioned from Loon; 1295: Partitioned into Rieneck-Rothenfels and Rieneck-Lohr; 1333: Rieneck-Lohr; 1366: Made fief of Mainz; 15th Century: Partitioned into Rieneck-Grünsfeld and Rieneck-Lohr
Rieneck	County	Franc	FR	1559: Condominium between Mainz (3/4) and Hanau-Münzenberg (1/4); 1673: Mainz portion sold to Nostiz-Rieneck; 1803: Nostiz-Rieneck portion sold to Colloredo-Mansfeld; 1806: To Regensburg; 1815: To Bavaria
Rieneck-Grünsfeld	County	n/a	n/a	15th Century: Partitioned from Rieneck; 1502: Extinct; to Würzburg
Rieneck-Lohr	County	Franc	FR	1295: Partitioned from Rieneck; 1333: Renamed to Rieneck; 15th Century: Partitioned from Rieneck; 1559: Extinct; divided between Mainz and Würzburg
Rieneck-Rothenfels	County	n/a	n/a	1295: Partitioned from Rieneck; 1333: Extinct; divided between Mainz, Würzburg and Rieneck-Lohr
Rietberg	Lordship; 1353: County	Low Rhen	WE	1237: Formed when Conrad I of Cuijk-Arnsberg acquired Rietberg from Lippe; 1353: HRE Count; 1456: Made fief of Hesse-Cassel; 1562: To Hesse-Cassel directly 1565: Restored; 1618: To John III, a scion of East Frisia; 1690: Under Imperial administration 1702: Restored; 1758: Extinct; to Kaunitz-Rietberg; 1807: To Westphalia; 1815: To Prussia
Rixingen	Lordship; 1310: County	n/a	n/a	1191: First mentioned; to Werd; 1218: Partitioned from Werd; 1310: Extinct; to Leiningen-Dagsburg; 1317: To Leiningen-Hardenburg; 1343: To Leiningen-Rixingen; 1506: To Zweibrücken-Bitsch; 1570: To Leiningen-Westerburg-Leiningen; 1622: To Leiningen-Westerburg-Rixingen; 1661: Left the Empire; part of France; 1705: To Leiningen-Westerburg-Altleiningen and Leiningen-Westerburg-Neuleiningen; 1795: To France directly
Rochefort	Lordship; 1494: County	n/a	n/a	11th Century: First mentioned 1147: Extinct; to Walcourt-Rochefort; 1418: To Mark-Arenberg by marriage 1454: To Mark-Rochefort; 1544: To Stolberg-Königstein; 1574: To Löwenstein-Wertheim; 1611: To Löwenstein-Wertheim-Rochefort; 1737: To the House of Stolberg (common territory); 1795: To France; 1815: To the Netherlands; 1830: To Belgium
Roggenburg	Abbacy	Swab	SP	1126: Formed; 1482-5: Imperial immediacy 1802: To Bavaria
Roggendorf	HRE Lordship; HRE County			1600: To Austria
Rosheim	Imperial City	Upp Rhen	RH	1303: Free Imperial City; 1648: Left the Empire; to France; 1679: Independence revoked
Rostock	Principality	n/a	n/a	1234: Partitioned from Mecklenburg; 1300: Fief of Denmark; 1312: City of Rostock seized by Mecklenburg; 1314: Extinct; rest to Denmark; 1323: To Mecklenburg
Rot an der Rot (Roth an der Roth; Mönchsrot; Münchenroth)	Abbacy	Swab	SP	1126: Formed; 1497: Imperial immediacy 1803: To Wartenberg-Roth; 1806: To Württemberg
Rothenburg ob der Tauber	Imperial City	Franc	SW	1274: Free Imperial City; 1803: To Bavaria
Rothenfels	County	Swab	SC	11th Century: First mentioned; to Buchhorn; 1331: To Montfort-Tettnang; 1354: To Montfort-Tettnang-Tettnang; 1439: To Montfort-Tettnang-Rothenfels; 1567: Sold to Königsegg-Aulendorf; 1588: To Königsegg-Rothenfels; 1804: Sold to Austria; 1805: To Bavaria
Rötteln	Lordship	n/a	n/a	1102: First mentioned; fief of Basel c. 1215: Partitioned into Rötteln-Rötteln and Rötteln-Rotenburg; 1279: Reunited by Rötteln-Rötteln; 1316: Extinct; to Baden-Hachberg-Sausenberg
Rötteln-Rotenburg	Lordship	n/a	n/a	c. 1215: Partitioned from Rötteln; 1278: Bequeathed to Basel and St. Blaise's Abbey; 1280: Extinct
Rötteln-Rötteln	Lordship	n/a	n/a	c. 1215: Partitioned from Rötteln; 1279: Acquired Rotenburg; renamed to Rötteln
Rottenmünster	Abbacy	Swab	SP	1224: Formed; 1237: Imperial immediacy 1803: To Württemberg
Rottweil	Imperial City	Swab	SW	1268: Free Imperial City; 1463: Ally of the Swiss Confederation; 1802: To Württemberg
Rügen	Principality	n/a	n/a	1168: Rani made a fief of Denmark; 1325: Extinct; to Pomerania-Wolgast (fief of Denmark until 1438)
Runkel	Lordship	n/a	n/a	1159: First mentioned 1227: Partitioned into Runkel-Westerburg and Runkel-Runkel
Runkel-Runkel	Lordship	n/a	n/a	1227: Partitioned from Runkel; 1454: Inherited Wied, renamed to Wied-Runkel
Runkel-Westerburg	Lordship	n/a	n/a	1227: Partitioned from Runkel; 1467: inherited much of Leiningen-Dagsburg, renamed to Leiningen-Westerburg
Ruppin	County	Upp Sax	WE	c. 1214: To Gebhard of Arnstein, founder of the line Lindow-Ruppin; 1349: Acquired Wusterhausen and Gransee; 1407: Acquired Neustadt; 1524: Extinct; to Brandenburg
