= Poppo I =

Poppo I may refer to:

- Poppo I, Margrave of Carniola (died before 1044)
- Poppo I of Blankenburg (ca. 1095–1161 or 1164)
