= County of Blankenburg =

State of the Holy Roman Empire (1123–1815)

Coordinates: 51.798256°N 10.961097°E

County of Blankenburg (till 1707) Principality of Blankenburg (since 1707) Grafschaft Blankenburg (till 1707) Fürstentum Blankenburg (since 1707)
- 1123–1815
- Coat of arms

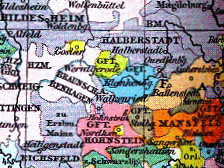
- County of Blankenburg (blue) about 1400
- Status: County
- Capital: Blankenburg (Harz)
- Common languages: Eastphalian
- Historical era: Modern history
  - Partitioned from Saxony: 1123
  - To Prince-Bishop of Halberstadt: 1182
  - Joined Lower Saxon Circle: 1500
  - Enfeoffed to Brunswick-Lüneburg by Welf prince-bishop: 1599
  - Principality: 1707
  - Real union with Brunswick as Blankenburg district: 1815
  - East-West division: 22 July 1945
| Preceded by | Succeeded by |
| Duchy of Saxony | Duchy of Brunswick |

The County of Blankenburg (German: Grafschaft Blankenburg) was a state of the Holy Roman Empire. Its capital was Blankenburg, it was located in and near the Harz mountains.

== History ==
=== County of Blankenburg ===
About 1123 Lothair of Supplinburg, then Duke of Saxony, had Blankenburg Castle erected in the Eastphalian Harzgau region. His vassal Poppo I of Blankenburg, a relative of Lothair's wife Richenza of Northeim, is documented as count over the Eastern Harzgau since 1128. He later also appeared as a ministerialis of the Welf duke Henry the Lion. After Poppo's death around 1161, his sons divided their heritage: Conrad took his residence at Regenstein Castle, 4 km (2.5 mi) north of Blankenburg, and became the ancestor of the noble House of Regenstein, while his brother Siegfried I retained Blankenburg Castle.

In 1180 Henry the Lion was deposed by an intervention of his Hohenstaufen cousin Emperor Frederick Barbarossa, allied with many Saxon vassals and former supporters of Duke Henry. However, the then ruling Counts of Blankenburg, Henry and Siegfried II, remained true liensmen of their liege lord, until Prince-Bishop Dietrich of Halberstadt, newly raised to Imperial immediacy by the emperor, besieged Blankenburg Castle and defeated them with his troops in 1182. After swearing allegiance to Dietrich, the brothers could maintain their county, their descendants laid out the Blankenburg settlement beneath the castle about 1200. The estates remained under suzerainty of the Halberstadt prince-bishops, strongly contested by the Welf dukes of Brunswick-Lüneburg.

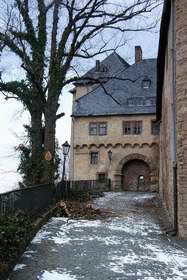
Blankenburg Castle

In 1599 the comital family became extinct, and the fief was reverted to the Prince-Bishopric, which at that time was held by the Welf administrator Duke Henry Julius of Brunswick and Lunenburg. Even though the Bishopric was secularised as the Principality of Halberstadt and given to the "Great Elector" Frederick William of Brandenburg by the 1648 Peace of Westphalia, the Welfs kept the fief of Blankenburg, which became an eastern exclave of their Principality of Wolfenbüttel. In 1690, the county was given to the younger son of Duke Anthony Ulrich of Brunswick-Wolfenbüttel, Prince Louis Rudolph.

=== Principality of Blankenburg ===
In 1707 Prince Louis Rudolph managed to betroth his daughter Elisabeth Christine to Charles VI of Habsburg and to get Charles' elder brother Emperor Joseph I to raise his county to an immediate principality, thus ending Halberstadt's mediate liege lordship. Since 1731 Prince Louis Rudolph of Blankenburg upon the death of his elder brother Augustus William also inherited the Principality of Wolfenbüttel, both principalities were ruled in personal union, however, the princes of Blankenburg moved to Wolfenbüttel, the capital of the inherited bigger principality.

After the defeat of Duke Charles William Ferdinand of Brunswick-Wolfenbüttel by Napoléon Bonaparte at the Battle of Jena-Auerstedt, the Principality of Blankenburg was annexed to the newly established Kingdom of Westphalia in 1807, which in turn was dissolved after the Battle of Leipzig and Blankenburg was restituted. Charles William's son and successor, the "Black Duke" Frederick William of Brunswick-Wolfenbüttel, returned from British exile and entered into fighting the French expansion in Europe, dying at the Battle of Quatre Bras in 1815.

=== District of Blankenburg ===
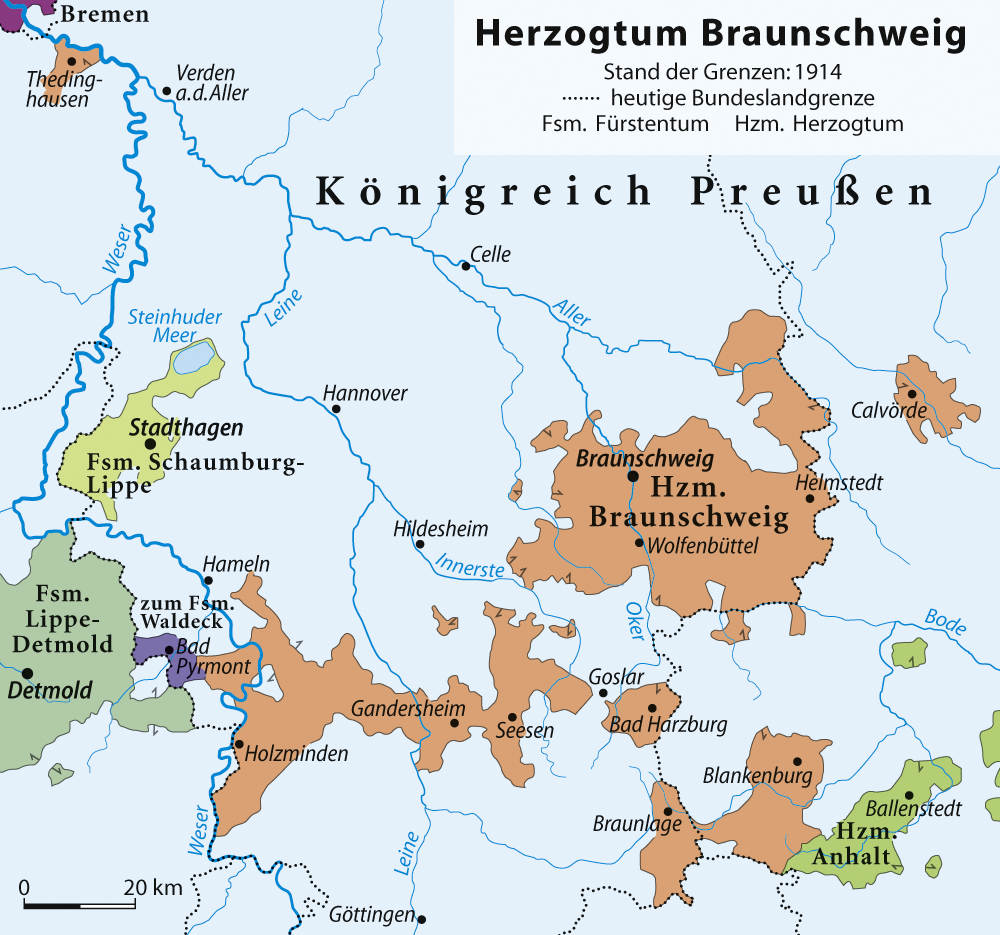
Duchy of Brunswick (1914), with southeastern Blankenburg district

In 1815 the principalities of Wolfenbüttel and Blankenburg were de jure united as Duchy of Brunswick, with the former Principality of Blankenburg becoming an administrative district within the new duchy. The duchy became the Free State of Brunswick after the abdication of the dukes in 1918. After the apportionment of assets and liabilities between the states of the Weimar Republic and the abdicated regnal houses in 1924 the ducal family maintained - among other estates - its castle in Blankenburg am Harz and Ernest Augustus, Duke of Brunswick, and his family returned from their Austrian exile in 1930 in order to live there. In 1942 the District of Blankenburg, until then a Brunswickian exclave between the Free State of Anhalt and the Prussian provinces of Hanover and Saxony became territorially connected with mainland Brunswick in the course of a territorial redeployment between the Free State of Brunswick and the Free State of Prussia.

According to the London Protocol (September 1944) all of the Free State of Brunswick was supposed to become part of the future British zone of occupation in Germany. So after US forces had conquered the region in April 1945 the District of Blankenburg was handed over to the Britons on 1 July. However, on July 22 the Britons put into effect a territorial redeployment between their zone and the Soviet occupation zone of Germany, shortening the zonal border by assigning exclaves and salients along the border to the respective other zone (mostly) surrounding them. Thus the District of Blankenburg was divided at its narrowest section into a western third, remaining with the British zone and the eastern two thirds, including the eponymous capital, becoming part of the Soviet zone to the dismay of the population there. The British army helped the ducal family to evacuate their chattels with 30 army trucks, a favour which other unfortunate families, not related to the British royal family, could not enjoy.

At uniting the Free State of Brunswick, except of the seized eastern exclaves and salients, and further German states to become Lower Saxony in 1946, the western third of the former Principality or District of Blankenburg, respectively, became part of that state. Until 1 July 1972 it formed a district of its own, named District of Blankenburg (German: Kreis Blankenburg), with the capital in Braunlage. Then - by an administrative redeployment - the western district was divided between the districts of Goslar and Osterode.

The eastern two thirds became first part of the Province of Saxony and then of the state of Saxony-Anhalt, founded in 1946. The eastern District of Blankenburg (German: Kreis Blankenburg) was dissolved on 30 June 1950, with its territory divided between the districts of Quedlinburg and Wernigerode. Since 1 July 2007 its former territory is included in the new Hartz mountains district.

== Geography ==
As of 1789, the Principality of Blankenburg was surrounded by (from the north clockwise): Brandenburg (County of Stolberg-Wernigerode and Principality of Halberstadt), Anhalt-Bernburg, Brandenburg (County of Hohnstein), and Brunswick-Grubenhagen. Cities were Blankenburg am Harz and Hasselfelde.

As of 1932, the District of Blankenburg was surrounded by (from north clockwise): Prussian Province of Saxony, Free State of Anhalt, Province of Saxony, Prussian Province of Hanover. Cities were Blankenburg am Harz, Braunlage and Hasselfelde.
