= Heimburg Castle =

- Burg Heimburg, Altenburg, Alteburg
- Heimburg
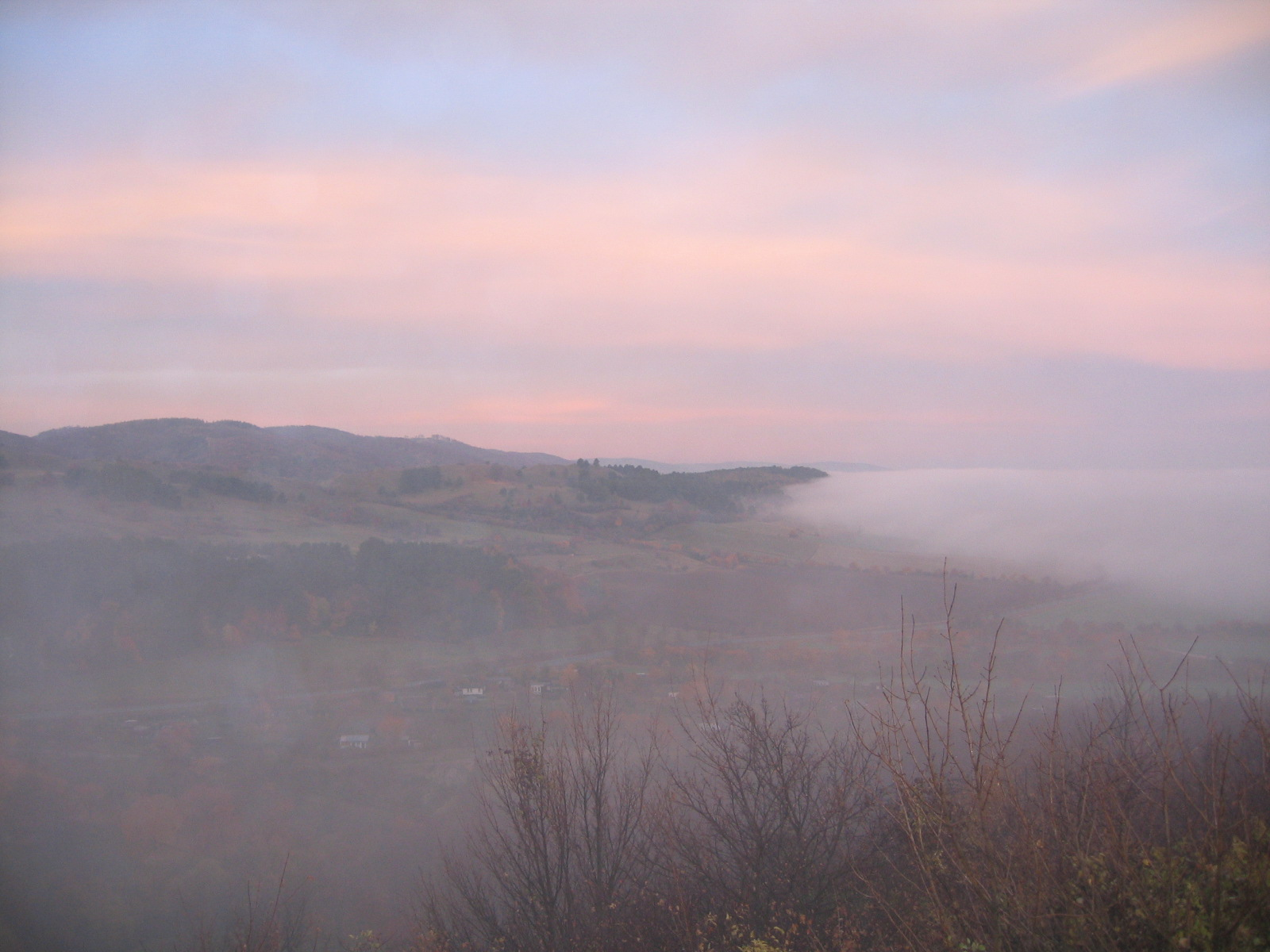
- Early morning view from Heimburg Castle looking west over the village towards the Harz

Site information
- Type: hill castle
- Code: DE-ST
- Condition: ruin

Location
- Location within Saxony-Anhalt Location within Germany
- Coordinates: 51°49′38″N 10°54′39″E
- Height: 330 m above sea level (NN)

Site history
- Built: 10th century

Garrison information
- Occupants: emperor, nobility, dukes

Heimburg Castle (German: Burg Heimburg), also called the Altenburg or Alteburg, is a ruined castle on an oval hilltop about 330 metres above sea level (NN) which is located just north of the Harz Mountains in central Germany. The ruins of this hilltop castle stand above the village of Heimburg in the borough of Blankenburg in the district of Harz in the state of Saxony-Anhalt. It is checkpoint no. 84 in the Harzer Wandernadel hiking network.

== History ==
The hill castle was probably built in the 10th century to defend the important Harz mining region and the route to the imperial hunting base of Bodfeld in the central Harz from Saxon princes. It was first mentioned as a possession of Emperor Henry IV in 1073. It was destroyed by the Saxons after the Battle of Welserholz in 1123. In 1143 the castle must have been rebuilt as it was entrusted to a ministerialis, Anno of Heimburg, by Henry the Lion. After losing a feud between Heimburg and Regenstein that had lasted for several generations, Heimburg conceded the castle to Count Ulrich I of Regenstein. One line of these counts thenceforth called themselves Regenstein-Heimburg. In the 16th century the castle was enfeoffed repeatedly but after its destruction in the Thirty Years' War it was not restored. The castle fell into ruins and was used as a source of stone for building materials. After the Regensteins died out in 1599 the fief was returned to its feudal lord, the Duke of Brunswick. Excavations were carried out on the site from 1891 to 1894 and, in 1990, the site was refurbished and opened to the public.

== Layout ==
Today the oval castle site consists of the remnants of a 10 metre high curtain wall, the remains of several other walls, ditches and ramparts and the round bergfried. The inner ward had an area of 60 by 35 metres.

== Sources ==
- Friedrich Stolberg: Befestigungsanlagen im und am Harz von der Frühgeschichte bis zur Neuzeit, Hildesheim 1983
