= Blankenburg Castle (Harz) =

Castle in Blankenburg, Saxony-Anhalt, Germany

- Schloss Blankenburg
- Blankenburg (Harz)
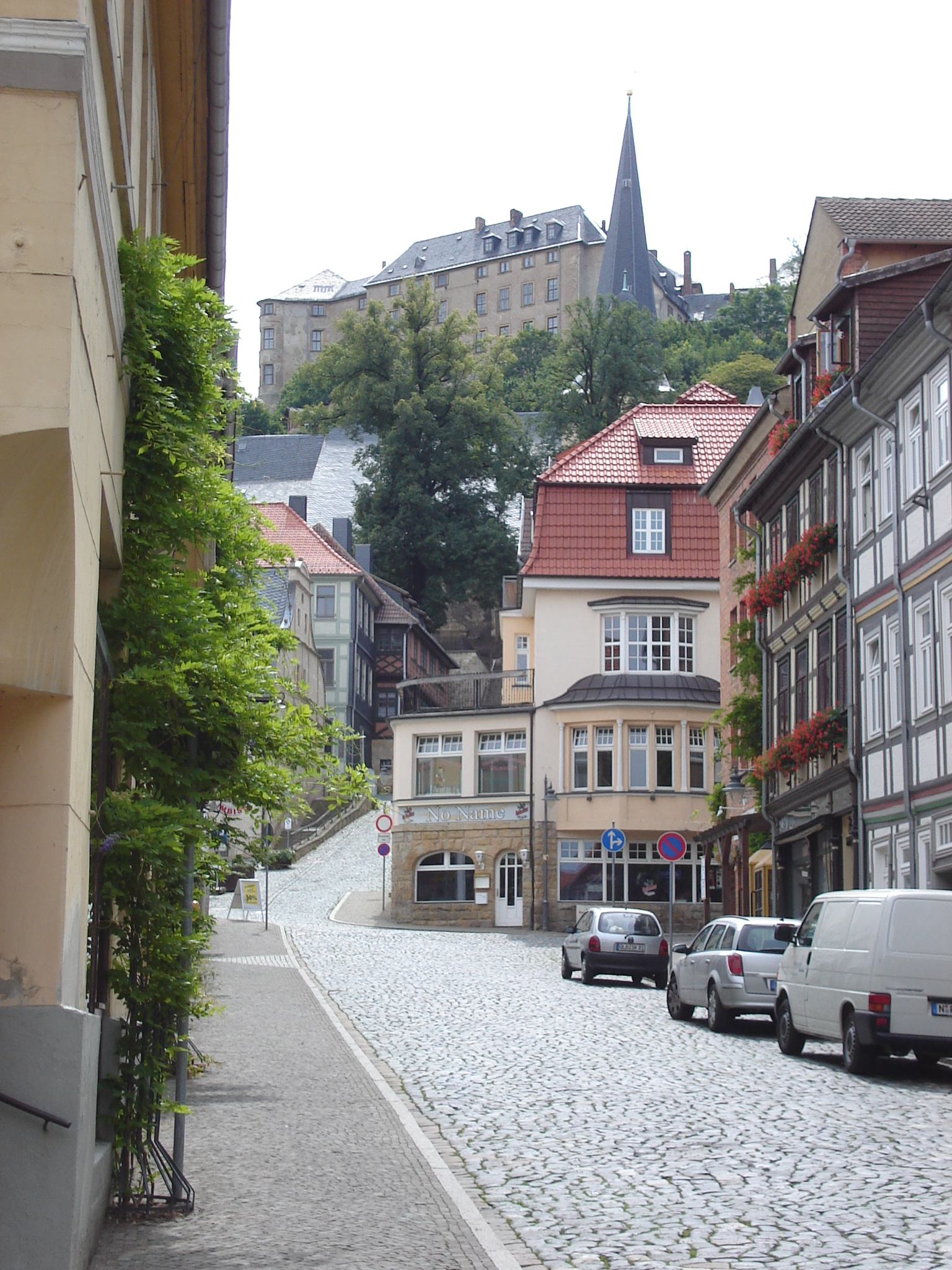
- Blankenburg Castle seen from the Altstadt of Blankenburg

Site information
- Type: hill castle
- Code: DE-ST
- Condition: Preserved, converted into a schloss

Location
- Location within Germany
- Coordinates: 51°47′12″N 10°57′17″E
- Height: 305 m above sea level (NN)

Site history
- Built: around 1123

Garrison information
- Occupants: nobility

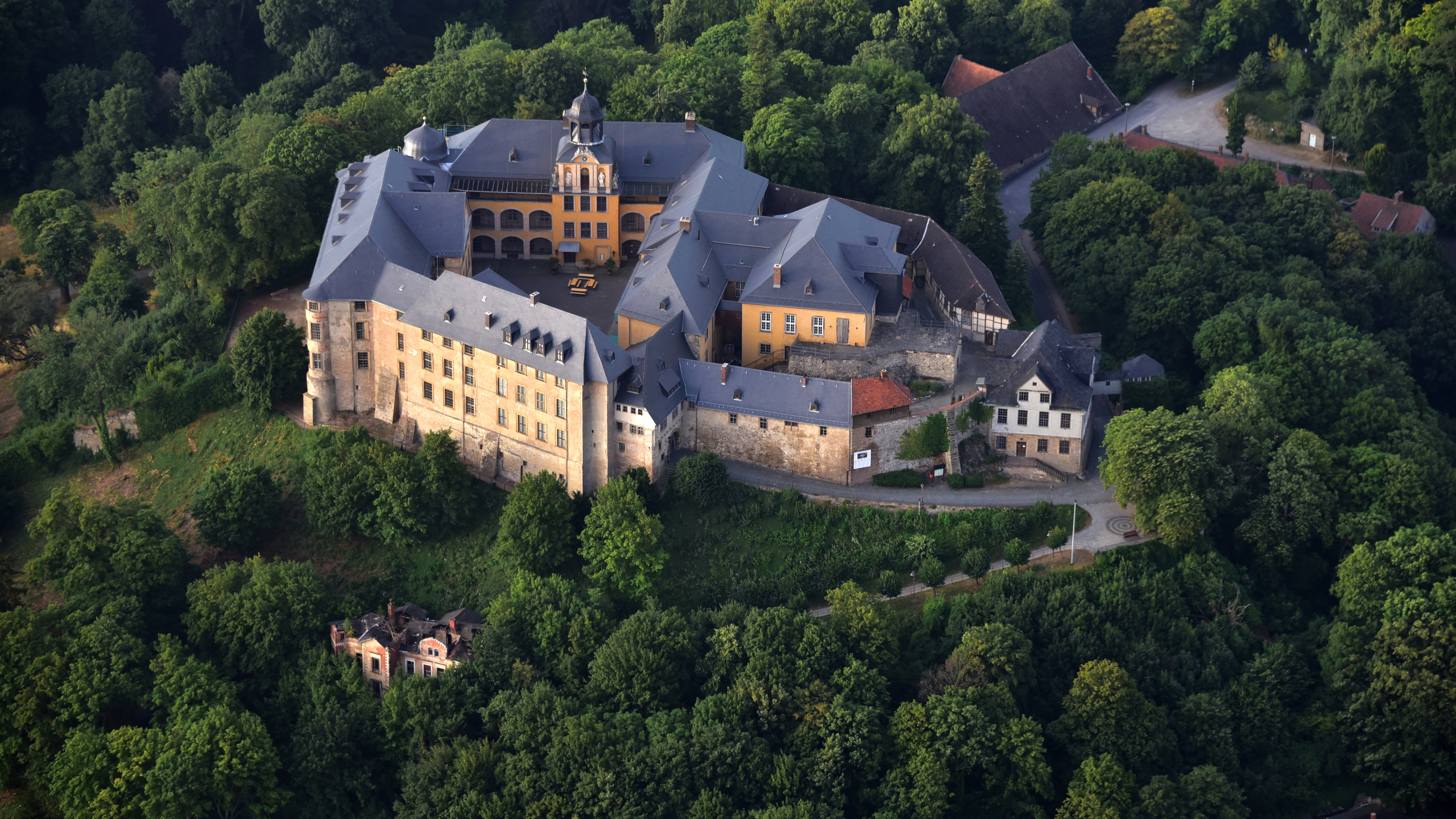
Blankenburg Castle

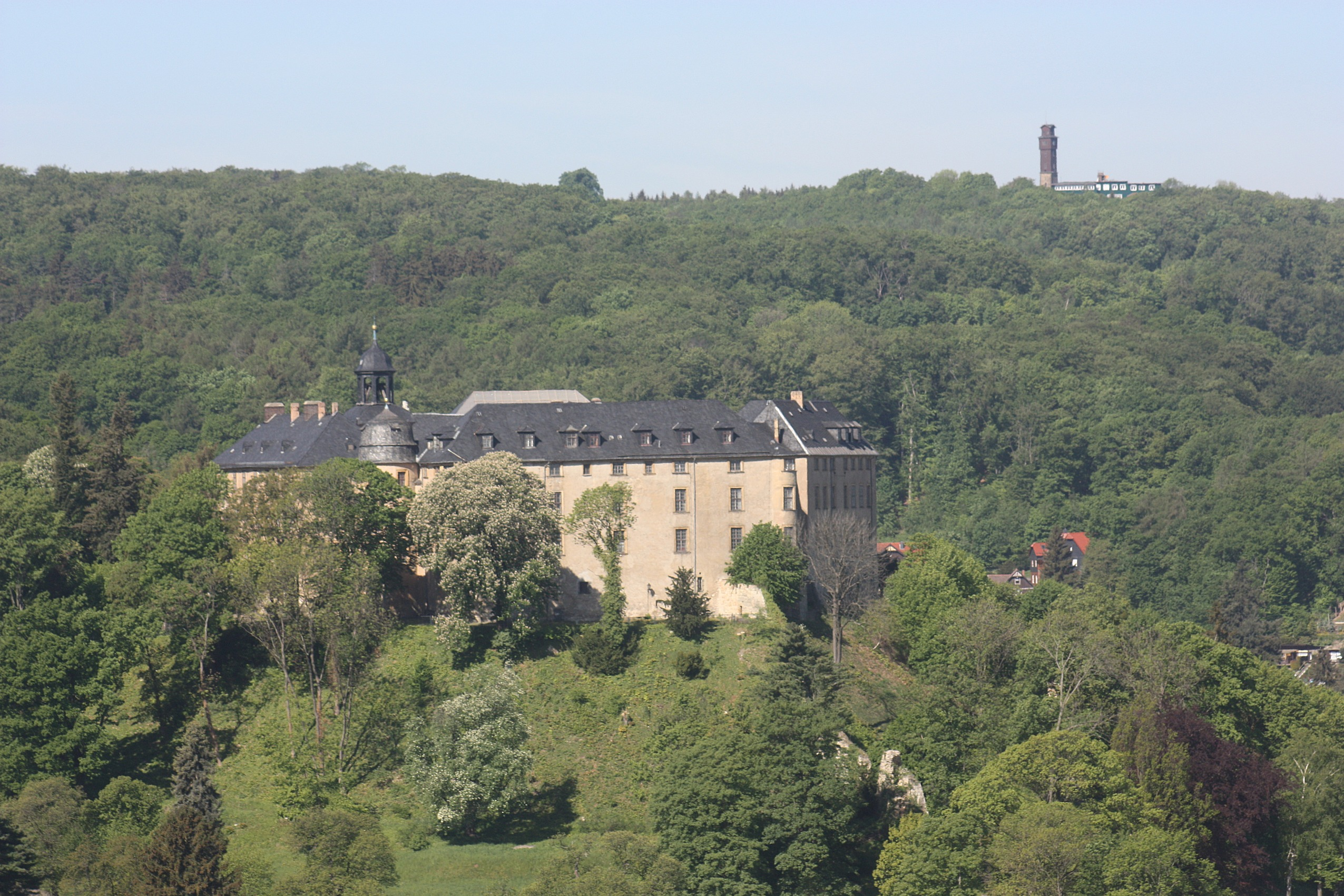
Blankenburg Castle

Great Blankenburg Castle (German: Schloss Blankenburg) was built on the limestone hill of Blankenstein (305 m above sea level (NN)) in the town of Blankenburg in the district of Harz in the German state of Saxony-Anhalt. Nearby is the Little Castle with its Baroque garden, tea house and museum, the town wall, the pheasant garden, the castle park and the castle pond.

== History ==
Around 1123 Lothair of Süpplingenburg had Blankenburg Castle built on the Blankenstein. Its suzerainty later passed to the House of Welf through Henry the Proud and Henry the Lion.

In 1128 Poppo, from the Frankish noble family of Reginbodonen, was given the county as a fief. His sons shared the county: Conrad received Regenstein Castle and Siegfried I, the Blankenburg. Siegfried I (Henry the Lion) did not return from a pilgrimage and left two sons, Henry and Siegfried II.

In 1181 the castle and town of Blankenburg were besieged, under the direction of Bishop Dietrich of Halberstadt, by imperial armies. Emperor Frederick Barbarossa took over the reins of power.

In 1182 Blankenburg was captured and eventually handed over for plundering. The brothers, Henry and Siegfried II went into captivity, but were given the county back again after peace was re-established. The castle was rebuilt and greatly extended.

In 1190 Count Henry took over the "agreed" estates of Regenstein and Siegfried II retained the County of Blankenburg, his descendants keeping possession of Blankenburg until 1343. Thereafter, the Blankenburg and Regenstein Castle went back to the younger Heimburg line of the House of Regenstein.

In 1386, according to legend, the Blankenburg was supposed to have been secretly looted in the night by Dietrich of Wernigerode, while Count Busso was absent. There is a carved head in the castle wall that recalls this raid.

Around 1500 Count Ulrich XI, despite serious debts, had the east wing knocked down and a palace-like building constructed. In 1539 Count Ulrich V broke away from the Roman Catholic Church.

On 19 November 1546 a fire broke out at night before the new building had been occupied, which destroyed large parts of the old castle. According to legend, the fire was start with dry kindling by the castle firelighter under the stairs of the old castle, after baptists had paid him with gold. The sleeping residents noticed the fire too late. The maids and servants fled onto the rooftops and out of the windows and down the walls, but forgot their masters. The younger children were dropped out of the windows by their nurses wrapped in blankets. Countess Magdalena of Regenstein was trapped by the flames. The countess asked her husband, Count Ulrich to leave her and save his life. The count escaped through the toilet window and hung from it on the outside before being rescued having been badly burnt. In memory of the fire and the dead, Count Ulrich had a plaque made with inscriptions in Latin and German. It portrays the count, the countess, their six sons and four daughters.

In 1599 the House of Regenstein died out and the castle went back to the dukes of Brunswick.

In 1705 the conversion of the Renaissance castle into a Baroque residence was started by state architect, Hermann Korb, on behalf of Duke Louis Rudolf of Brunswick-Wolfenbüttel. The reconstruction resulted in a simpler and clearer structure of the outer shape and lasted until 1718. Also created were reception rooms (the Grey Hall, Reduten Hall and Imperial Hall) in the interior, and a multi-storey, octagonal royal church.

When Elizabeth Christine married the future emperor, Charles VI, during the time of residence of Louis Rudolf, Emperor Joseph I elevated Blankenburg to the status of a principality. Elisabeth Christine's eldest daughter later became the Empress Maria Theresa.

The family of the Duke Ernest Augustus of Brunswick (1887–1953) and his wife Duchess Victoria Louise, Princess of Prussia (1892–1980), lived in the castle from 1930 until their flight and the expropriation of their property in 1945. The family had been given the castle as their private property as compensation in the wake of loss of the principality in 1924. In 1917 the only daughter of the Duke and Duchess, Frederica, who was later Queen of the Hellenes and mother of the Spanish queen, Sophia, was born here. In 1937, the Duke and Duchess hosted a ball here celebrating the engagement of their daughter Frederica with then crown prince Paul of Greece.

The court of Blankenburg became famous for its festivals and theatrical performances.

After 1945 the House of Hanover was expropriated, thereby losing the Old and the New Castle together with vast forests at Blankenburg, as well as Hessen castle and estates.

Under the East German rule, the Technical College for Domestic Commerce was housed in Blankenburg Castle. During this time the building was architecturally maintained. Following the closure of the school with the demise of East Germany in 1990 a long period began in which the castle was not used and the building became neglected as a result. Plans by a buyer, who had acquired the castle in 1996, to run a major tourist project did not come to fruition. Years of decline followed, resulting in leaking roofs, permanent damp in the building and its infestation by dry rot, leading to a danger of collapse. Vandalism and theft made for further decline.

The vacancy for 12 years almost destroyed the substance of the building. What looks imposing and impressive from a distance is exposed to decay in many places on closer inspection. However many people from Blankenburg and friends of the castle formed an association in 2005 in order to preserve the castle. With work and support of many partners and sponsors as well as various subsidies, they have succeeded in completing the most important safeguard measures for the preservation of the building and making the first parts accessible again. The most representative rooms of the complex can be visited during the regular public guided tours of the castle. The Grey Hall, the Theater, the Castle Chapel, the Imperial Hall and the Knight's Hall have been restored and are now available for guided tours and events. Romantic weddings are also held once again in the castle.
