= Regenstein Castle =

- Burg Regenstein
- Blankenburg (Harz district)
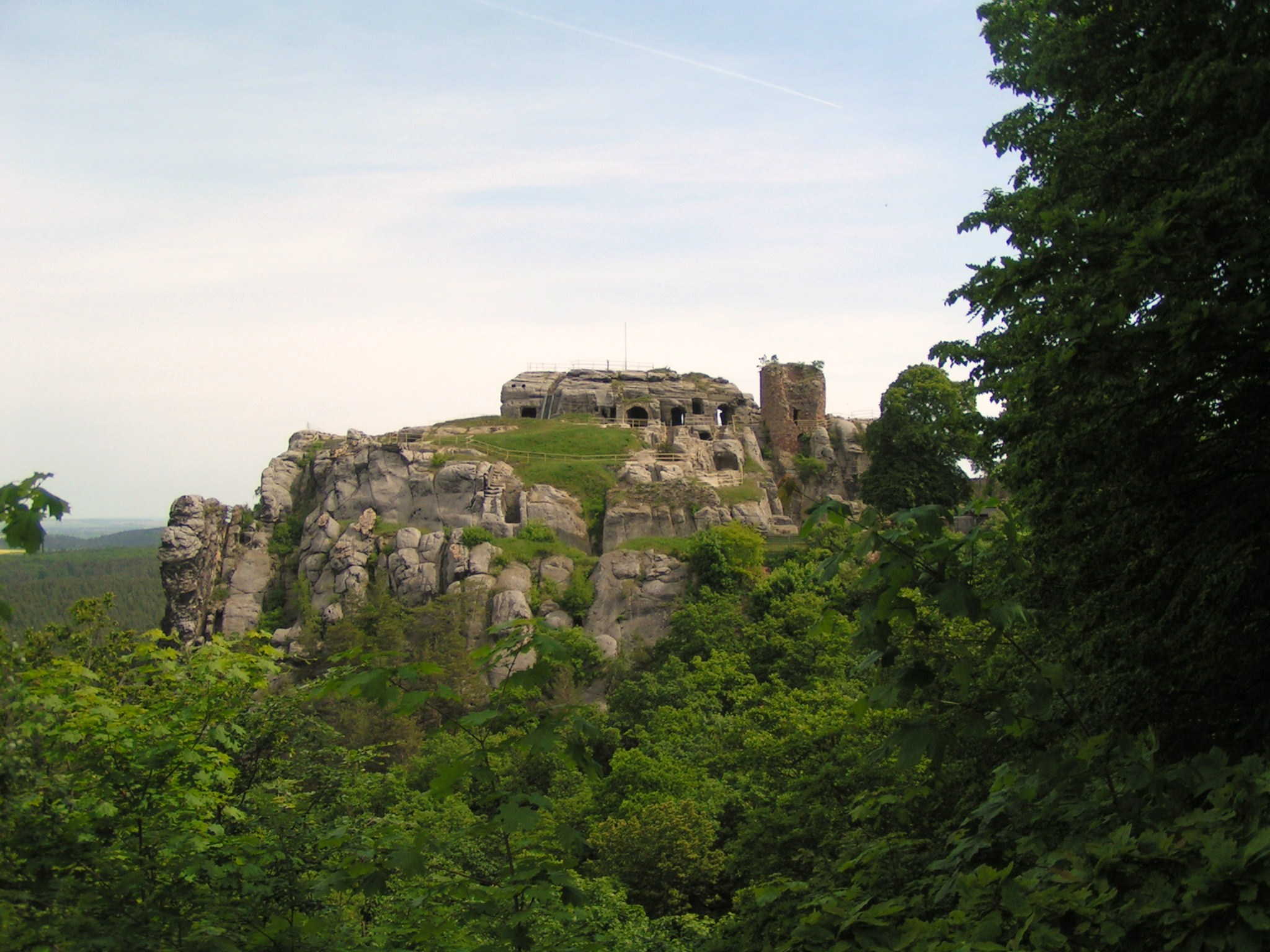
- The ruins of Regenstein

Site information
- Type: Rock castle
- Code: DE-ST
- Condition: ruin

Location
- Location within Saxony-Anhalt Location within Germany
- Coordinates: 51°48′55″N 10°57′35″E

Site history
- Built: 12th century

Drone footage

Regenstein Castle (German: Burg Regenstein) is a ruined castle that lies three kilometres north of Blankenburg in the German state of Saxony-Anhalt. It is a popular tourist destination where, each year, a knight's tournament and a garrison festival are held.

Of this once relatively impregnable castle, which was built in the early and high Middle Ages on a 294 metre high sandstone rock towering over the surrounding area, only ruins are visible today. Several internal rooms, carved into the rock, have survived, as have the ruins of the keep. The castle is surrounded by remnants of a more recent fortress. Regenstein Castle is No. 80 in the system of checkpoints on the Harzer Wandernadel hiking trail network. Below the castle is the site of the old Regenstein Mill that used to supply it with water.

== Castle of the Regenstein counts ==
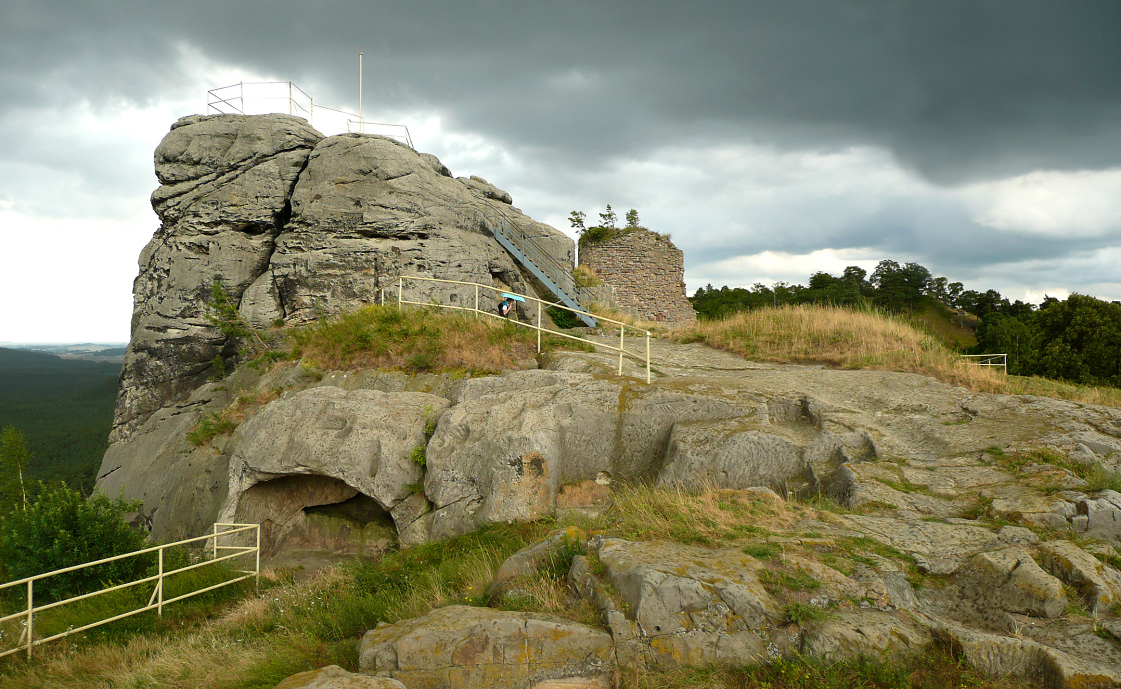
The keep

in 1162 the Comes de Regenstein (Count of Regenstein), Conrad, was mentioned for the first time. He was the son of Count Poppo I of Blankenburg from the House of Reginbodonen. The castle became renowned mainly through Count Albert II of Regenstein (1310-1349) who, in the 1330s, had frequent disputes with the rulers of the surrounding towns, the Bishop of Halberstadt and the Abbess of Quedlinburg. This has been romantically recounted in the ballad, Der Raubgraf ("The Robber Count"), by Gottfried August Bürger (music by Johann Philipp Kirnberger) and the novel by Julius Wolff (Der Raubgraf).

In the 15th century, the Regenstein counts moved to Blankenburg Castle. Regenstein fell into disrepair and became a ruin. The last male descendant of the noble family, Count John Ernest of Regenstein in 1599.
In 1643 after several changes of ownership Regenstein, which was sometimes written as Rheinstein or Reinstein, was enfeoffed by Archduke Leopold William of Austria in his capacity as Bishop of Halberstadt to the Lower Bavarian count, William of Tattenbach. From then on members of this noble family went under the title of "Count of Reinstein-Tattenbach". In 1671 John Erasmus, Count of Reinstein-Tattenbach was beheaded in Austria for being party to the magnate conspiracy, following which Prince-Elector Frederick William of Brandenburg confiscated the county.

== Prussian fort ==
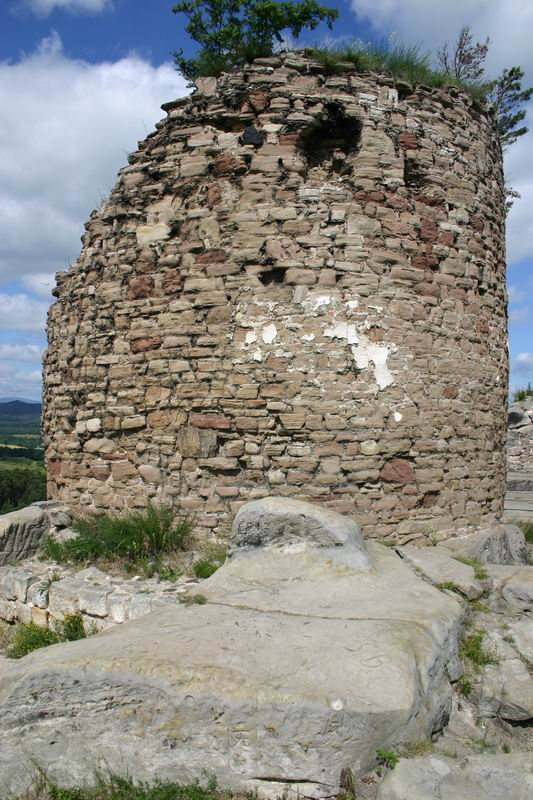
The keep

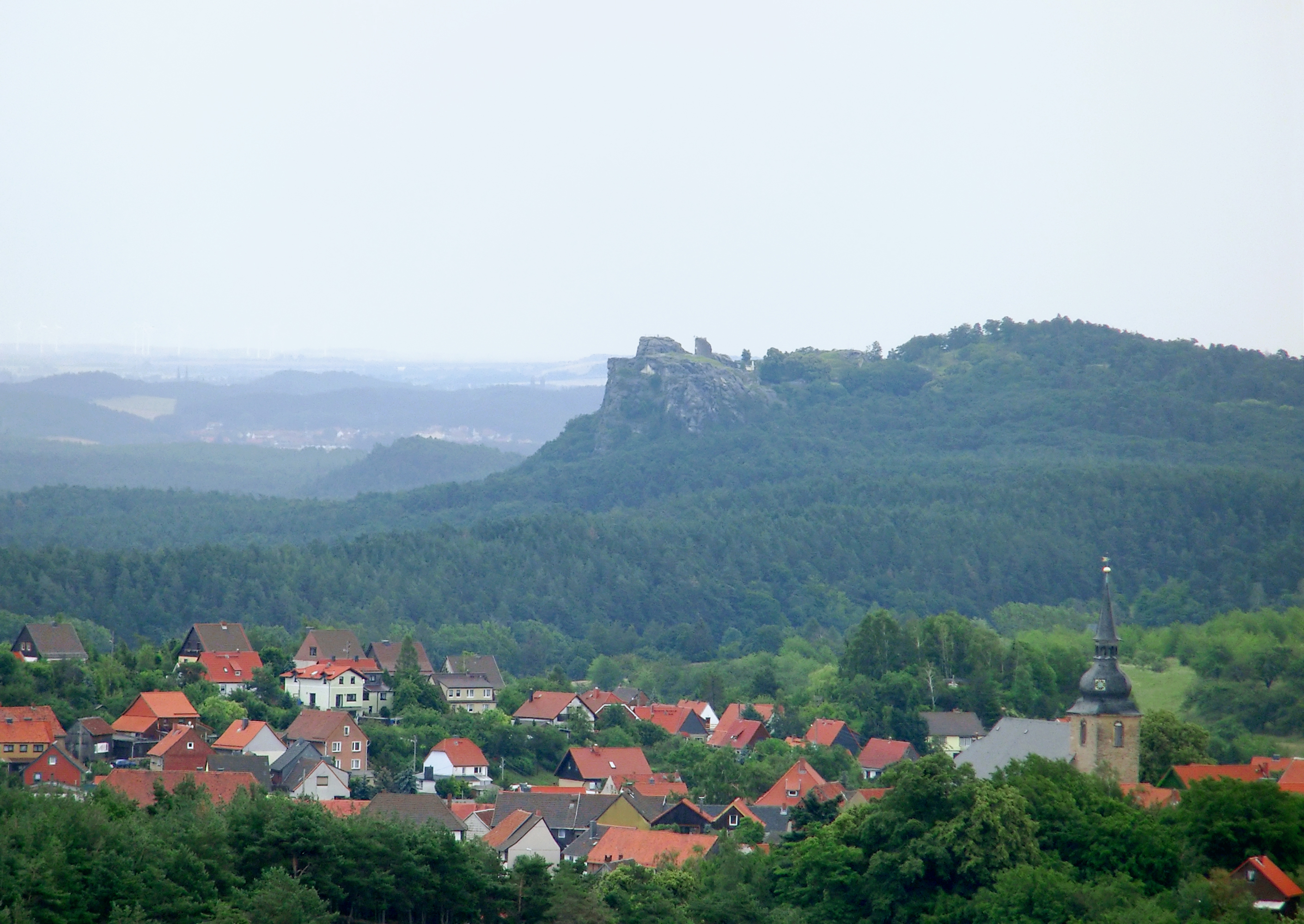
Regenstein Castle from the crest of the Ziegenberge. In the foreground: the village of Heimburg

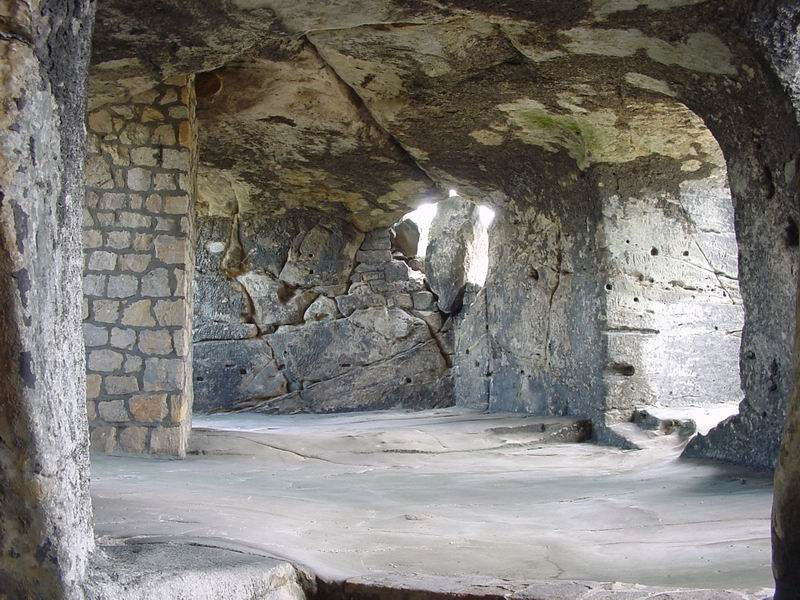
Room hewn out of the rock in the centre of the medieval castle

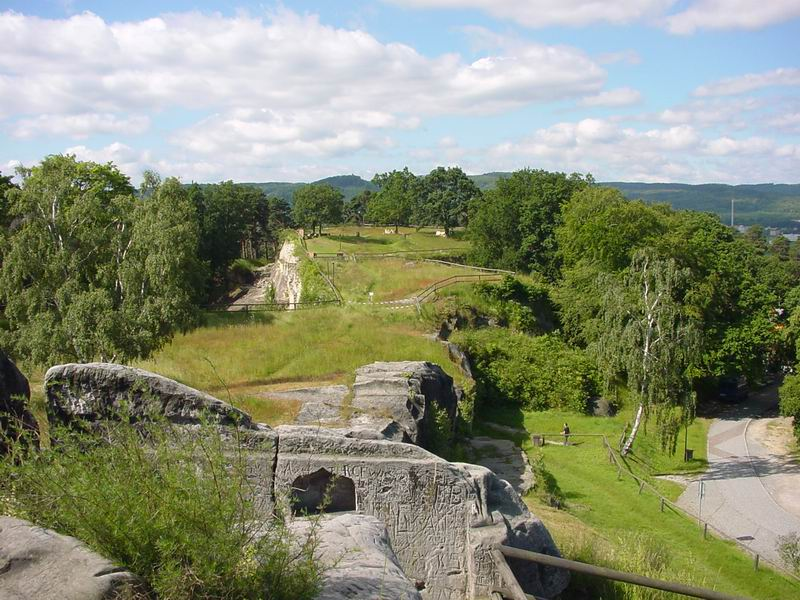
View towards the Scharfe Ecke ("sharp angle")

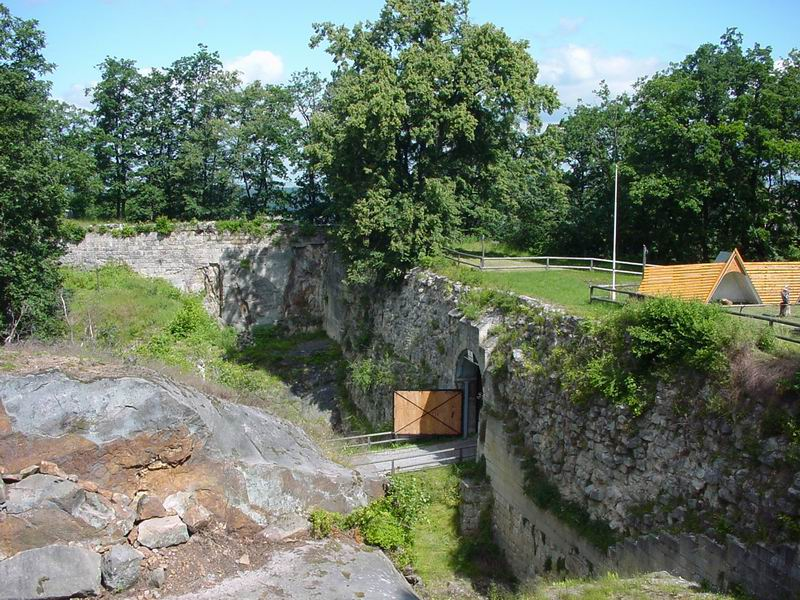
Fortification ditch and gateway

From 1671 the medieval castle was expanded into a fortress by the Prussians, who were the last users of its military function. The original castle occupies only a small part of the greater fortification. In 1677 the fort became a garrison. The length of its outer perimeter was extended in 1742 to 1,200 metres. Even under the French, to whom the fortress had to be handed over on 12 September 1757, it was extended structurally. The Prussians captured it five months later (12 February 1758) and rendered the position unusable. The powder magazine, which was located near the top was blown up. Of the fortress only the casemate, those facilities carved out of the rock and the (now restored) gateway remain. A characteristic of the fortress is the large number of cavernous rooms in the natural rock (one now houses an exhibition of archaeological finds from the castle site). Even the stables were hewn out of the rock. After 1758, the pastures and forests of the Regenstein went to the Prussian Amt of Westerhausen. From 1815 to 1945, following the reign of Westphalia (1807-1813, Canton Halberstadt Land), Regenstein became the smallest Prussian exclave and belonged to the district of Halberstadt. Today it is part of the town of Blankenburg.

Johann Wolfgang von Goethe visited the Regenstein on 11 September 1784 together with the artist, Georg Melchior Kraus, on his third trip to the Harz (8 August to 14 September 1784) to conduct geological studies (two drawings and a rock sample from Goethe's collection of rocks recall that visit). The first restaurant was opened in 1812, thus beginning the rock's role as a tourist attraction.

== The legend of the Regenstein ==
According to legend, once upon a time one of the most beautiful young women in the land was imprisoned in the dungeon of Regenstein Castle, because she had spurned the love of the Count of Regenstein. Using a diamond ring she scratched a hole in the rock, which became so large after a year that she was able to crawl through and escape. After her escape, she returned with her family to the castle, but the count had fled. A little later, she noticed thick smoke gushing from a crack in a rock wall. When she looked through it, she saw the count in purgatory. Then, out of pity, she threw him her ring to him in order to enable the spirit of the count to rest.

== See also ==
- County of Regenstein
- House of Regenstein

== Sources ==
- Steinhoff, R. (1883). Der Regenstein, Blankenburg: A. Brüggemann.
- Bürger, K. (1905). Der Regenstein bei Blankenburg/Harz - seine Geschichte und Beschreibung seiner Ruinen, Braunschweig: E. Appelhans
- Wedler, H. and Dülsner, E. (1967). Die Burgruine Regenstein, Leipzig, Jena, Berlin: Urania-Verlag, 7th ed.
- Behrens, Heinz A. (1989). Der Regenstein - Besiedlung und Geschichte der Grafen bis 1500, Blankenburg: Burg- und Festung Regenstein (ed.)
- Behrens, Heinz A. and Reimann, J. (1992). Der Regenstein Baugeschichte und Festungszeit, Blankenburg: Burg- und Festung Regenstein (ed.)
- Woltereck, K. Der Regenstein am Harz - Eine deutsche Trutzburg aus vorgeschichtlichen und geschichtlichen Zeiten, Gernrode: Carl Mittag, o.J.
