= Blankenburg (Harz) =

- Town
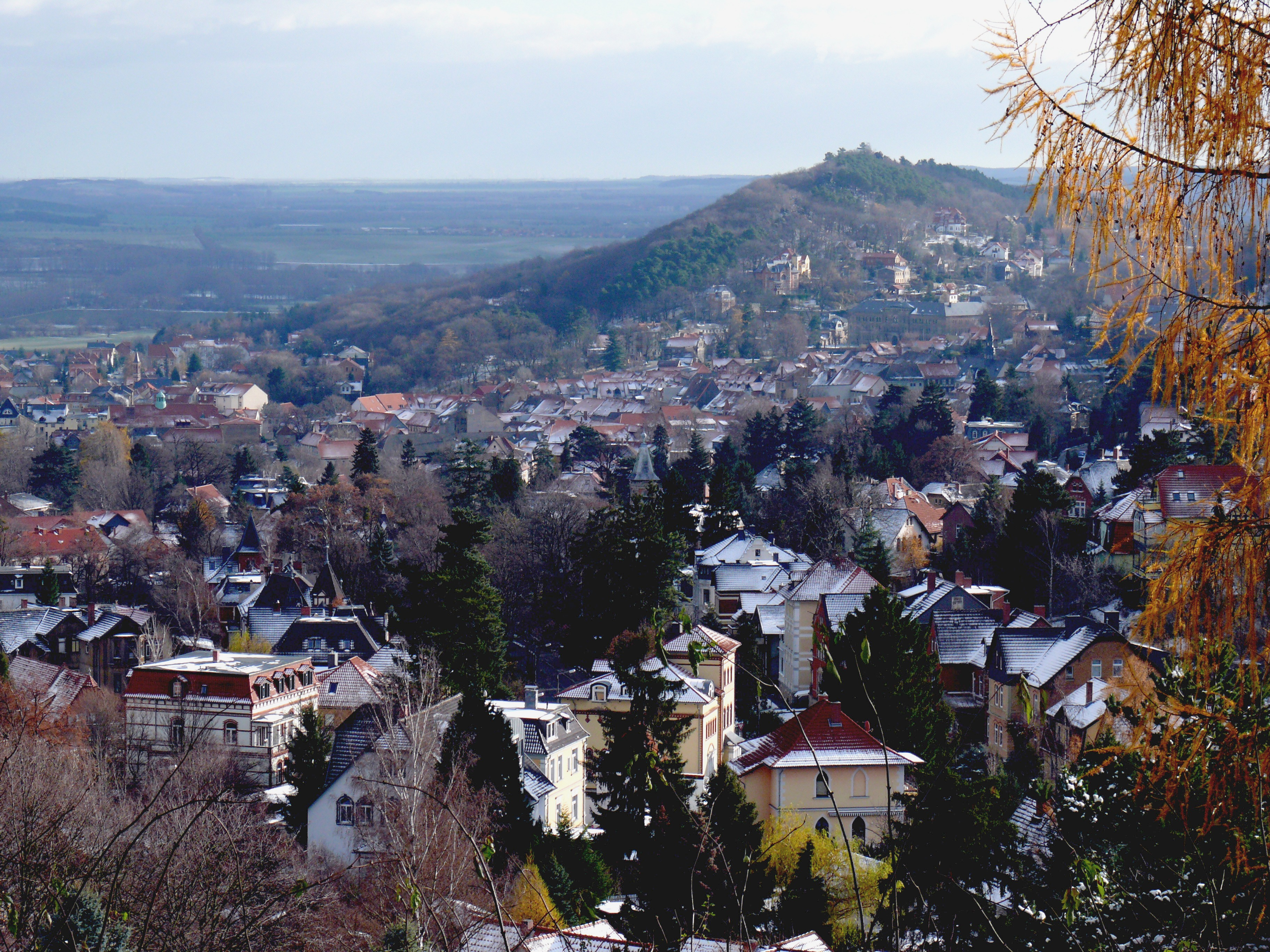
- Blankenburg seen from the Eichenberg to the west of the town

- Coat of arms

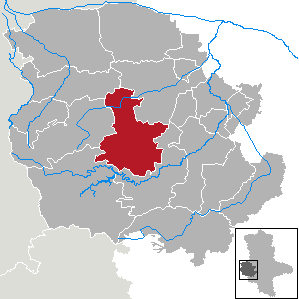
- Location of Blankenburg within Harz district
- Interactive map of Blankenburg
- Location within Germany Location within Saxony-Anhalt
- Coordinates: 51°47′43″N 10°57′44″E
- Country: Germany
- State: Saxony-Anhalt
- District: Harz
- Subdivisions: 6

Government
  - Mayor (2022–29): Heiko Breithaupt (CDU)

Area
  - Total: 148.94 km^{2} (57.51 sq mi)
- Elevation: 288 m (945 ft)

Population (2025-12-31)
  - Total: 18,765
  - Density: 125.99/km^{2} (326.31/sq mi)
- Time zone: UTC+01:00 (CET)
  - Summer (DST): UTC+02:00 (CEST)
- Postal codes: 38889
- Dialling codes: 03944
- Vehicle registration: HZ
- Website: http://www.blankenburg.de

Blankenburg (Harz) (German pronunciation: [ˈblaŋkn̩bʊʁk]) is a town and health resort in the district of Harz in Saxony-Anhalt, Germany, at the north foot of the Harz Mountains, 12 miles (19 km) southwest of Halberstadt.

It has been largely rebuilt since an 1836 fire, and possesses a castle with various collections, a museum of antiquities, an old town hall and churches. There are pine-needle baths and a psychiatric hospital. The nearby ridge of rocks called the Teufelsmauer ('Devil's Wall') offers views across the plain and into the deep gorges of the Harz.

== Geography ==
The town of Blankenburg (Harz) lies on the northern edge of the Harz mountains at a height of about 234 metres. It is located west of Quedlinburg, south of Halberstadt and east of Wernigerode. The stream known as the Goldbach flows through the district of Oesig northwest of the town centre.

=== Divisions ===
The town Blankenburg (Harz) consists of Blankenburg proper and the following Ortschaften or municipal divisions:

- Börnecke
- Cattenstedt
- Derenburg
- Heimburg
- Hüttenrode
- Timmenrode
- Wienrode

In addition there are the following unofficial names for localities in the town:

- Gehren
- Helsungen
- Michaelstein
- Oesig
- Regenstein
- Sonnenbreite

=== Neighbouring settlements ===
Clockwise from the north:

- Municipality of Nordharz
- District town of Halberstadt
- UNESCO World Heritage Town of Quedlinburg
- Town of Thale
- Municipality of Oberharz am Brocken
- Town of Wernigerode

== History ==
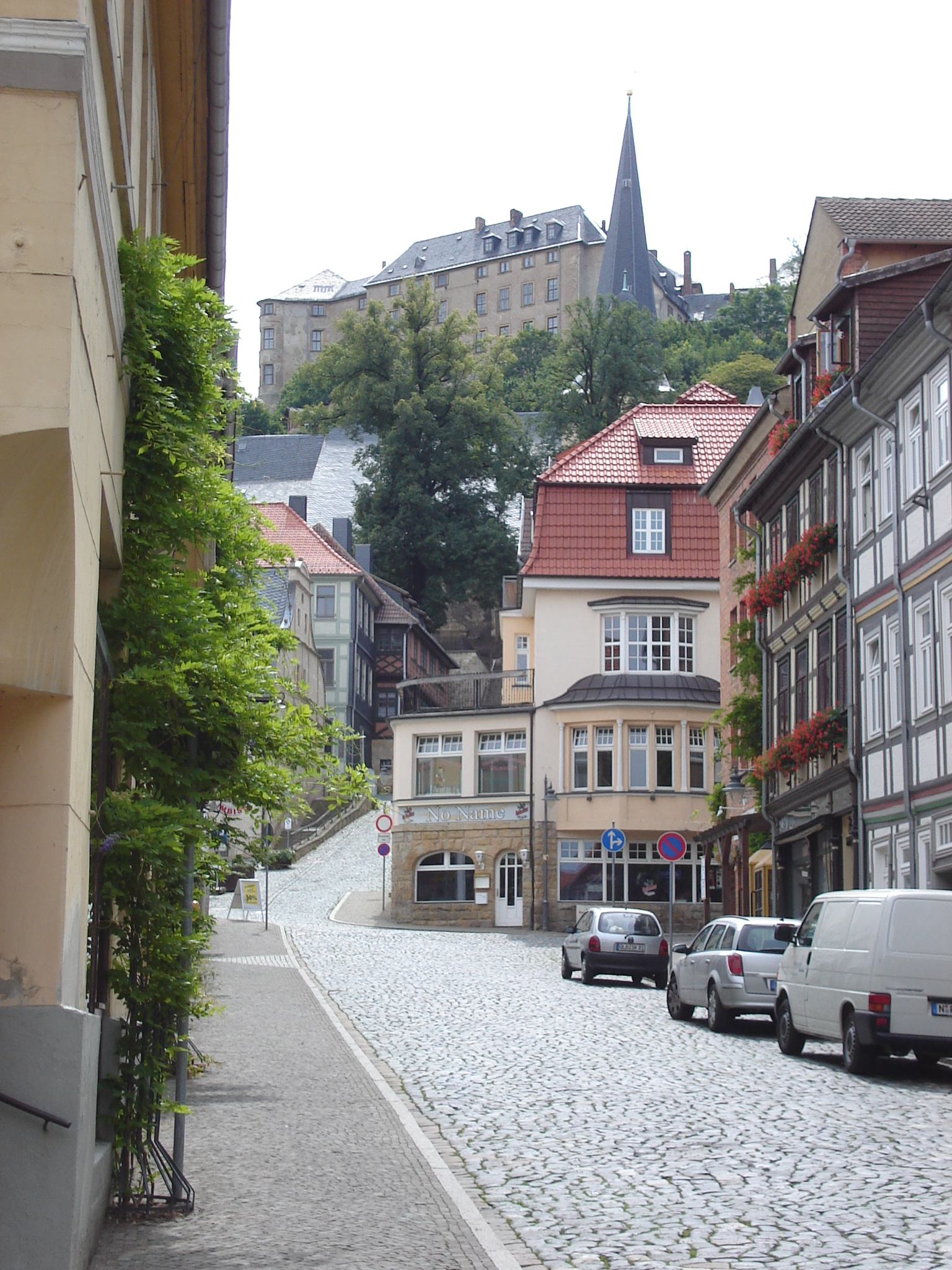
Blankenburg with its castle in the background

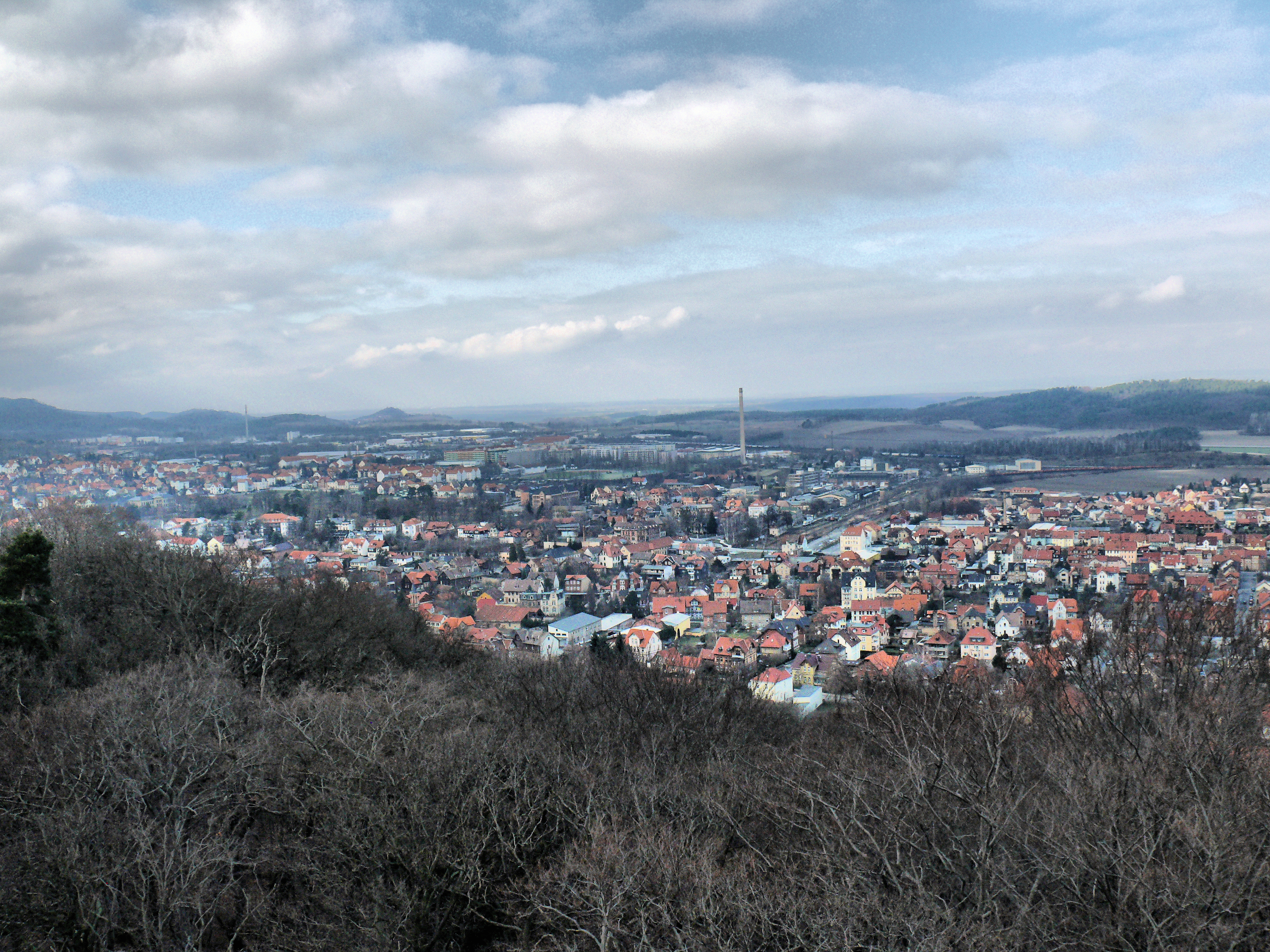
Blankenburg, view from the rocks of Großvaterfelsen to the north

The first traces of settlement date to the Old Stone Age, but the first recorded mention of Blankenburg goes back to 1123. The Saxon duke, Lothair of Supplinburg, installed Poppo, a nephew of Bishop Reinhard of Halberstadt, as count at the castle, which stood on a bare limestone rock on the site of the present castle. The name of the town derives from this castle.

Count Poppo I of Blankenburg very probably came from the Frankish noble family of Reginbodonen. His descendants were also subject to the nearby Regenstein Castle. This was a fief from the Bishopric of Halberstadt like the County of Blankenburg, also called the Hartingau. In 1180–82 Frederick Barbarossa had Blankenburg devastated because it had pledged "sole allegiance" to the Welf, Henry the Lion. In 1386 Blankenburg suffered heavy destruction again.

Following the death of the last count of Regenstein, John Ernest, the county went in 1599 as an agreed enfeoffment (erledigtes Lehen) back to the dukes of Brunswick-Lüneburg. During the Thirty Years' War Blankenburg was pressed by Albrecht von Wallenstein and was occupied in 1625. Nine cannonballs embedded in the walls of the town hall evince this difficult time.

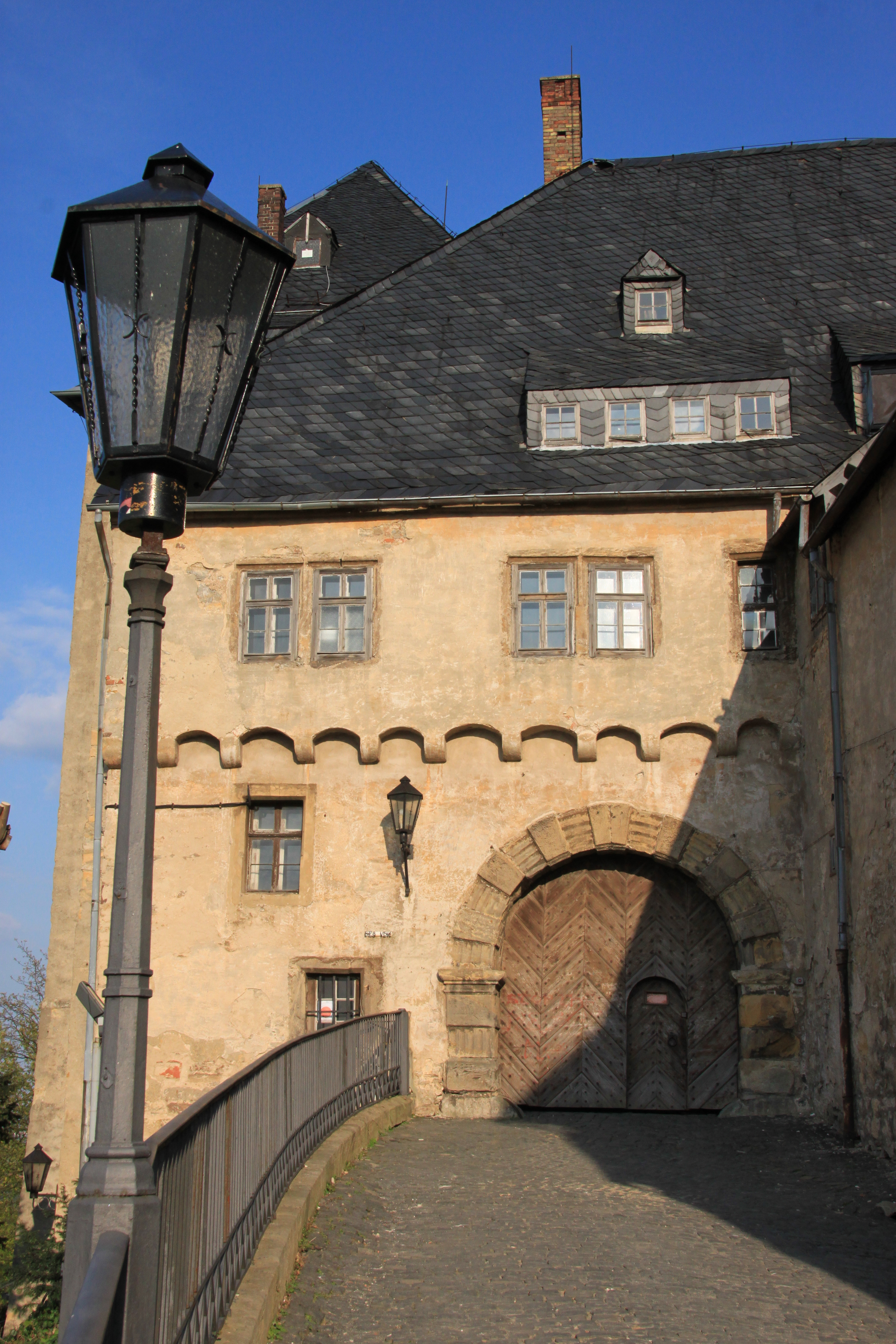
Blankenburg Castle

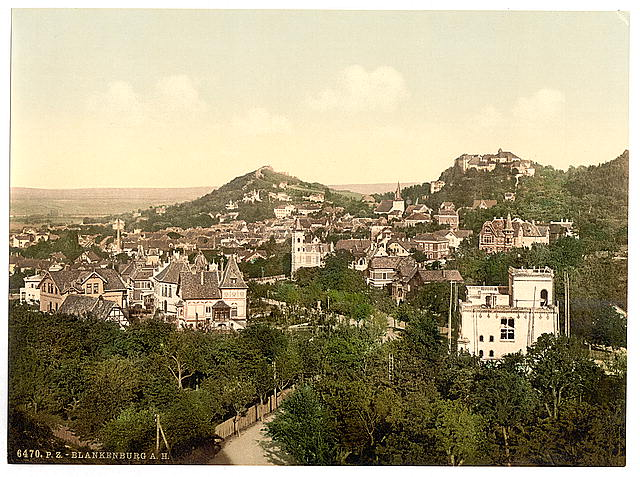
Blankenburg around 1900

The dukes of Brunswick-Lüneburg turned the place into a secondary residence in the 17th century and it enjoyed its heyday under Duke Louis Rudolf (1690–1731), the second son of Anthony Ulrich of Wolfenbüttel. Rudolf was given Blankenburg in 1707 as a paragium. At the same time the County of Blankenburg was elevated to the status of an imperial principality (Reichsfürstentum) which was ruled independently until 1731, but then, because Louis Rudolf became a duke, was reunited with Brunswick where it remained. The present-day Little Castle with its terraced garden and Baroque pleasure garden stems from that period.

In the Seven Years' War the absolute neutrality of the town made it a safe refuge for the Brunswick court. Louis XVIII also stayed in Blankenburg under the name of Count of Lille from 24 August 1796 to 10 February 1798, after his escape from Dillingen.

From 1807 to 1813, Blankenburg belonged to the Kingdom of Westphalia and returned to the Principality of Brunswick-Wolfenbüttel after the Wars of Liberation. From 1815 to 1918, as a result of the Congress of Vienna, Blankenburg belonged to the Duchy of Brunswick.

In the early days of Nazi era, those who opposed the Nazi regime were persecuted and murdered. In a notorious campaign by Brunswick SS commander, Jeckeln, in September 1933, 140 communists and social democrats were herded together in the inn, Zur Erholung. Here and in the Blankenburger Hof they were severely beaten, some dying as a result. During the Second World War the Blankenburg-Oesig subcamp of Buchenwald concentration camp was set up in the Dr. Dasch (Harzer Werke) Monastery Works and, shortly thereafter, subordinated to Mittelbau-Dora concentration camp. Here some 500 prisoners had to carry out forced labour in the monastery factory and Oda Works. In addition, there was a work camp run by the Gestapo for "half-Jews" who were forced to do hard labour. Another camp was occupied in February 1945 by inmates of the Auschwitz subcamp of Fürstengrube and managed as Blankenburg Regenstein subcamp.

As part of the division of Germany into occupation zones in 1945, Blankenburg district was initially assigned to the British zone in accordance with the Potsdam Conference and London Protocol. But because the larger eastern part of the district was linked to the rest of the British zone only by a road and a railway, the boundary was adjusted and Blankenburg incorporated into the Soviet zone. The largest part of the district thus ended up later in East Germany and became part of the state of Saxony-Anhalt. The main part of the former Free State of Brunswick went to the British zone and thus became part of Lower Saxony.

The tunnels of the Regenstein-Blankenburg facility were used from 1974 by the National People's Army (NVA) in the GDR as a large ammunition depot. In 1992 the Bundeswehr were given the 8 km long tunnel system and established there, "the largest underground pharmacy in the world", both for routine Bundeswehr missions, but also for disaster relief around the world and for cases of serious military "operations".

On 1 January 2010, the town Blankenburg absorbed the former municipalities Cattenstedt, Derenburg, Heimburg, Hüttenrode, Timmenrode and Wienrode.

== Jewish life in Blankenburg ==
At end of the 12th century, the abbess of Quedlinburg pledged estates to Blankenburg Jews. These appear at the time to have been both in Blankenburg and in Quedlinburg. Whether there was a synagogue in Blankenburg in the Middle Ages, is not clear.

In modern times, there was no longer a synagogue in Blankenburg. On Saturdays several Jewish families met at Chrons for the Sabbath, including the families of the businessmen Alexander Meyer, Moritz Westfeld and Conrad Hesse, as well as Anna Ewh and Lydia Rhynarsewsky. In the wake of Kristallnacht on 9 November 1938, Jews were deported from Blankenburg to different camps. In the census on 17 May 1939 there were still twelve Jewish citizens registered, including five men.

== Politics ==
Town hall

On 25 May 2009 the title Ort der Vielfalt ("Place of Variety") was conferred on the town by the federal government.

=== Town council ===
Since the local elections on 26.05.2019 the town council has been composed as follows:

- CDU: 8 seats
- AfD: 1 seat
- The Left: 3 seats
- Wählergruppe Pro Blankenburg: 3 seats
- SPD: 2 seats
- Alliance '90/The Greens: 2 seats
- Freiwillige Feuerwehr Derenburg: 2 seats
- Union Blankenburg UB: 1 seat
- FDP: 1 seats
- Wählergemeinschaft Timmenrode WGT: 1 seat
- Bürgeraktiv Wienrode BAW: 1 seats

The AfD got, according to the results in the local elections, 3 seats in the town council, but put up only 1 candidate.

== Economy and infrastructure ==
The most important economic factors for Blankenburg (Harz) are tourism and facilities for spa and health industry. In addition there are several small to medium sized businesses. The largest industrial concern in the town is the Harzer Werke Motorentechnik with about 60 employees, which grew out of a grey iron foundry founded in about 1870.

=== Transport ===
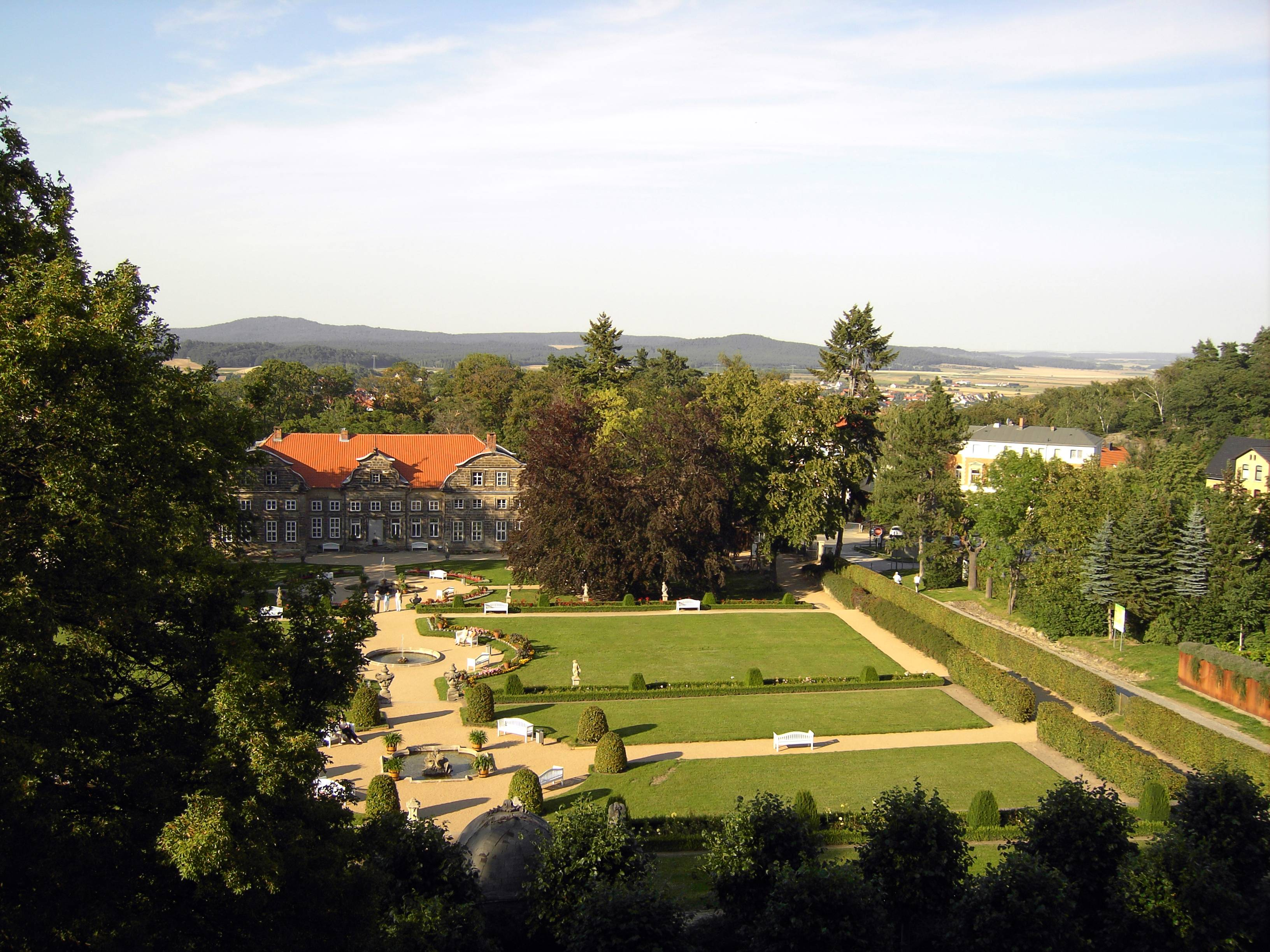
Little Castle and car park

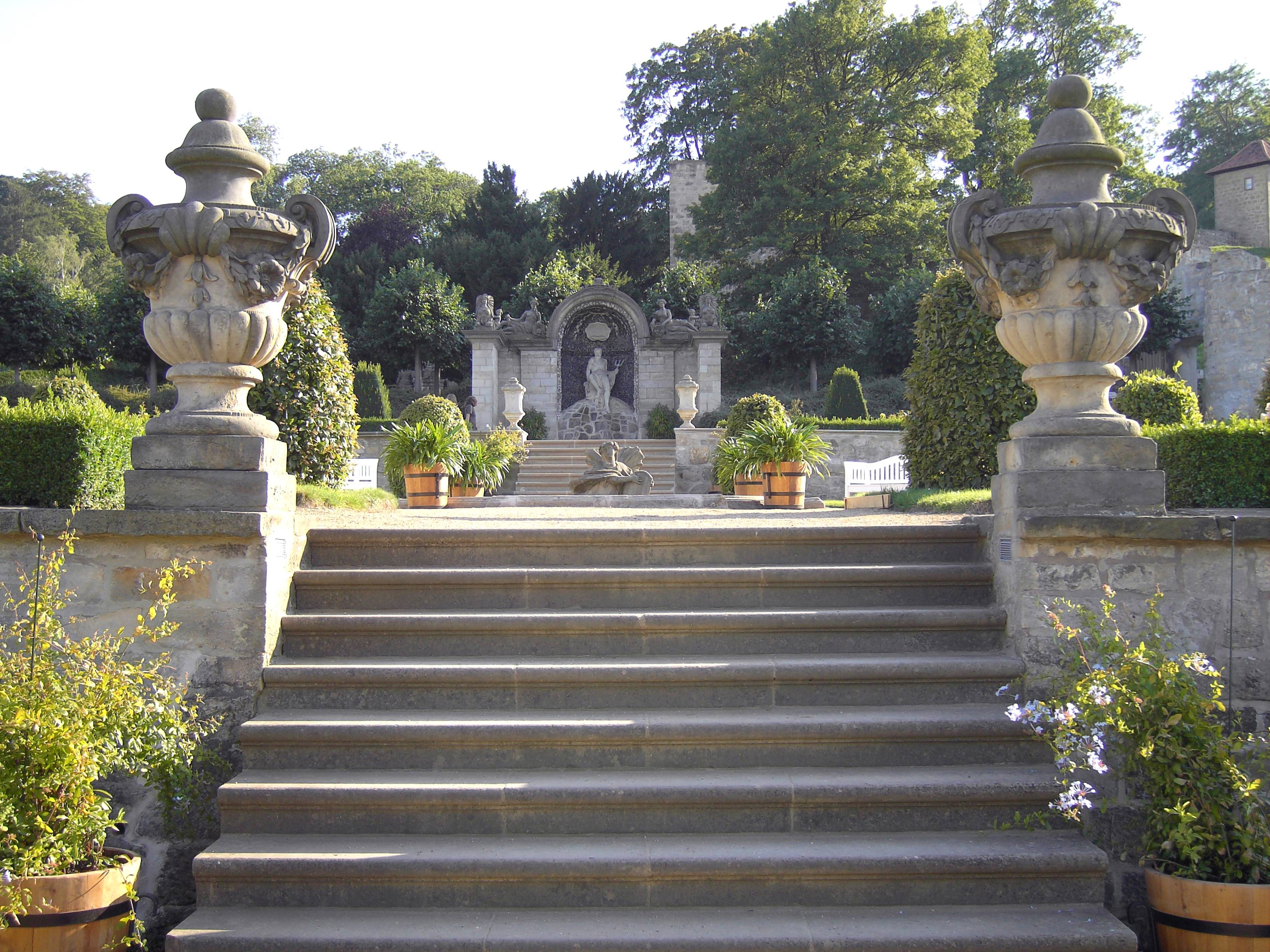
Baroque terraced garden at the Little Castle

Blankenburg (Harz) station is a terminus and has a bypass for goods traffic. There is a connection to Elbingerode (Rübeland Railway) (goods trains only) and Halberstadt. The regional express line RE31 operated by Abellio Mitteldeutschland connects Blankenburg and Halberstadt hourly and Magdeburg every 2 hours since December 2018. In the 20th century there was a line to Thale and Quedlinburg.

Blankenburg (Harz) is located next to the A 36, which was formerly known as the B 6n, and is linked to it over two junctions: Blankenburg Ost and Blankenburg Mitte. In addition, the B 27 federal road runs southwest and the B 81 north to south through Blankenburg (Harz).

=== Educational establishments ===
- Primary schools: Am Regenstein Primary School, Martin Luther School
- Secondary school: August Bebel School
- Grammar school: Gymnasium Am Thie
- Yamaha Music School, Schicker

=== Leisure and sports facilities ===
- Sportforum
- "Am Thie" open-air swimming pool

== Culture and places of interest ==
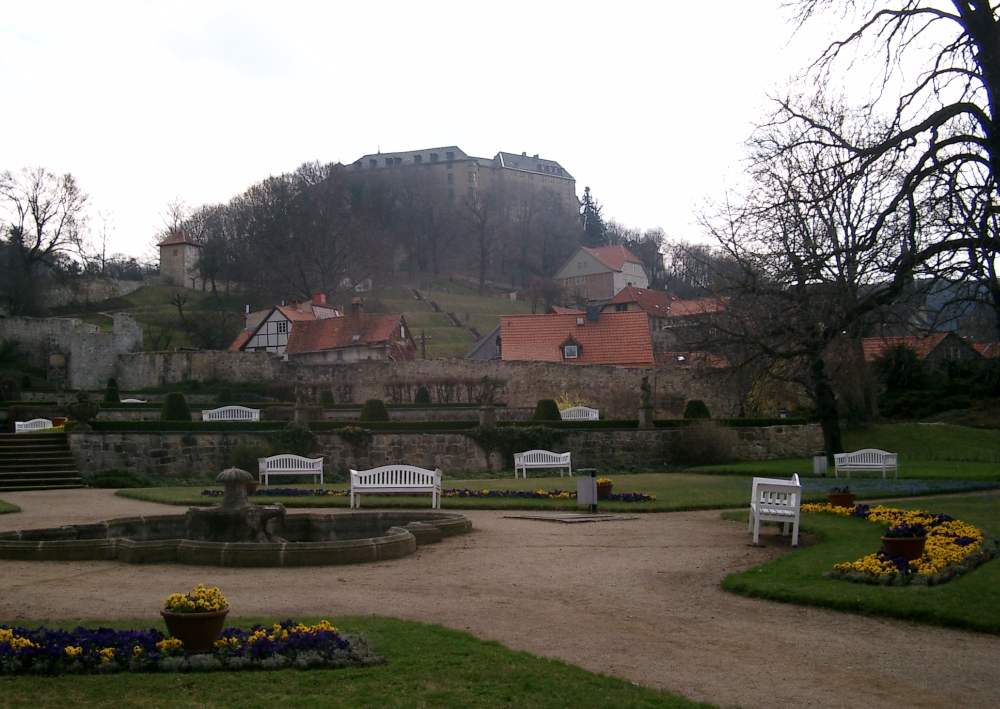
Baroque garden with Blankenburg Castle in the background

- Above the town to the south on the hill of Blankenstein (334 m) is Blankenburg Castle
- The Little Castle (Kleine Schloss) with its Baroque gardens belongs to the network of Saxony-Anhalt Garden Dreams. The gardens are checkpoint 78 in the Harzer Wandernadel hiking network.
- The town hall stems from the renaissance period (internally older, later converted).
- Above the town hall is the medieval parish church of St. Bartholomew. In the tower and the chancel of the church there are late Romanesque section of wall from around 1200. The statues of benefactors in the chancel, probably around 1300, belong to the other successors of the Naumburg benefactors' statues.
- The town has picturesque villas from the turn of the 20th century.
- Also worth seeing are the historic gardens (Baroque garden, castle park, pheasant garden, animal park).
- On the edge of the town lies the former robber baron castle and fortress of Regenstein.
- Regenstein Mill (Regenstein-Mühle) in the woods west of Regenstein Castle, an old mill with water channels carved out of the rock (Harzer Wandernadel checkpoint no. 82).
- The Teufelsmauer (Devil's Wall), a bizarre sandstone rock formation and geological natural monument
- The Ziegenkopf ridge and nature reserve.
- Remains of the Luisenburg castle.
- The sand caves of Sandhöhlen im Heers in the woods below Regenstein Castle which are also thought to be a Germanic cult site or thingstead (Harzer Wandernadel checkpoint no. 81).

=== Theatre ===
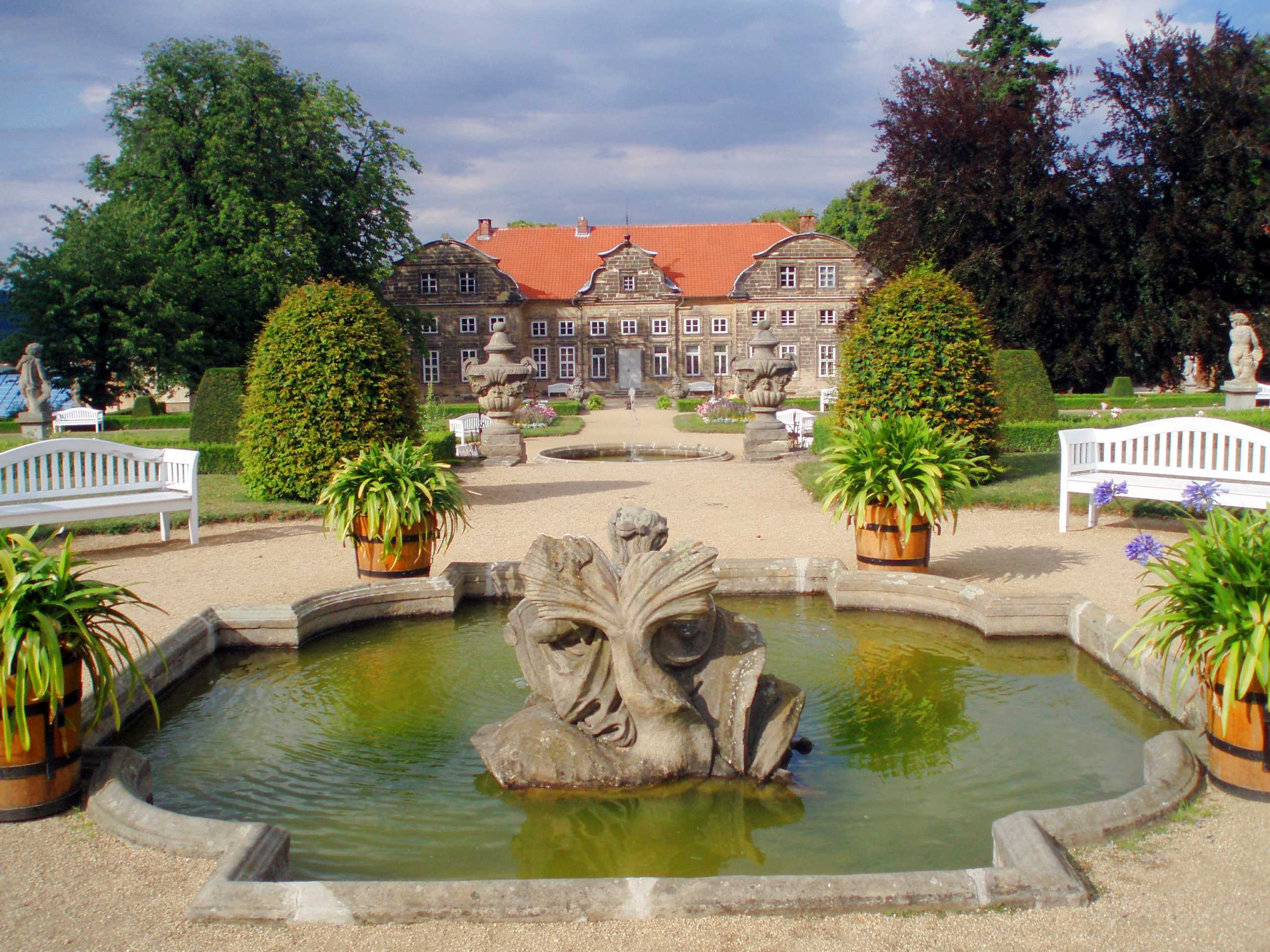
Little Castle in the Baroque garden

In the Great Castle is a theatre which is to be restored again.

=== Museums ===
- The town museum for Blankenburg (Harz) is in the Little Castle, the former ducal Lustschloss
- Unique in Germany is the hostel museum. It contains a large collection of items, as well as a library of craft work.
- In addition there is Michaelstein Abbey with its herb garden and instrument museum.

=== Buildings ===
- Great Castle
- Little Castle
- Town hall
- Church of St. Bartholomew
- Michaelstein Abbey
- Ruins of Regenstein Castle
- Wilhelm Raabe Tower west of Blankenburg (Harz) on the Eichenberg

=== Historical monuments ===
- Memorial grove for concentration camp prisoners and forced labourers of various nationalities at the levelled cemetery of Alten Friedhof on Lühner-Tor-Platz
- Monument stone in memory of the concentration camp inmates of the subcamp near the present-day Diesterweg School in the district of Oesig
- Memorial board in Mauerstraße 14 to the sentencing of 63 anti-fascists in September 1933

=== Regular events ===
- Viking Festival (Easter)
- Country- and Trucker Festival
- Knight's Tournament (in July)
- Abbey Festival
- Historic weekends (railways and markets; baroque castle gardens and parks)
- Michaelstein Abbey concerts (all year)
- Sternthal Christmas market

== Notable people ==
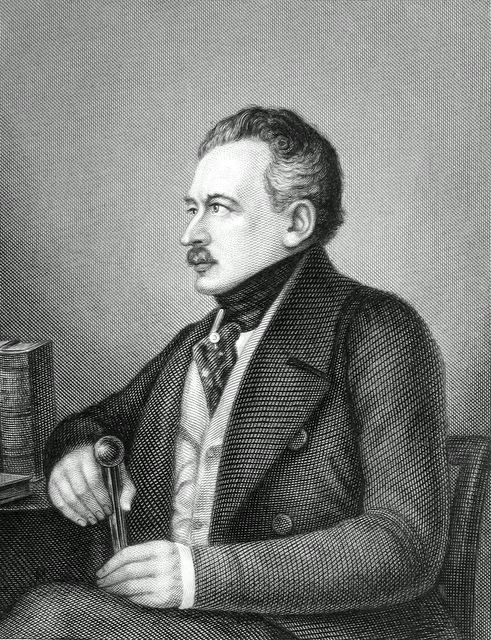
Joseph von Radowitz

- Joseph von Radowitz, (1797–1853), general and politician
- Alexander von Schleinitz (1807–1885), politician
- Adolph von Steinwehr (1822–1877), geographer, cartographer, brigadier general in the American Civil War (Battle of Gettysburg)
- Julius Elster (1854–1920), physicist
- Robert Koldewey, (1855–1925), architect and archaeologist
- Oswald Spengler, philosopher, (1880–1936) (The Decline of the West)
- Joachim Albrecht Eggeling, (1884–1945), Nazi Gauleiter
- Kurt Ranke (1908–1985), folklorist, Germanist, antiquarian and narrative researcher
- Polykarp Kusch, (1911–1993), co-recipient of the Nobel Prize for Physics in 1955
- Frederica of Hanover, (1917–1981), queen consort of Paul of Greece
- Susi Erdmann (born 1968), bob driver
- Christian Lademann (born 1975), cyclist
- Subaru Kimura (born 1990), German-Japanese actor

== Twin towns ==
- Herdecke, North Rhine-Westphalia
- Meerbusch, North Rhine-Westphalia
- Wolfenbüttel, Lower Saxony
- Georgsmarienhütte, Lower Saxony

== See also ==
- County of Blankenburg
