= Principality of Halberstadt =

State of the Roman Empire

Principality of Halberstadt Fürstentum Halberstadt
- Province of Brandenburg-Prussia
- 1648–1817
- Coat of arms
- Capital: Halberstadt
- Area
  - Coordinates: 51°53′N 11°2′E
- History
  - Established: 1648
  - Disestablished: 1817
Preceded by	Succeeded by
Bishopric of Halberstadt	Province of Saxony

The Principality of Halberstadt (German: Fürstentum Halberstadt) was a state of the Holy Roman Empire ruled by Brandenburg-Prussia. It replaced the Bishopric of Halberstadt after its secularization in 1648. Its capital was Halberstadt. In 1807, the principality was made a state or regional capital of the Kingdom of Westphalia. In 1813, control of the principality was restored, and its sovereign rights were confirmed as the possession of the Kingdom of Prussia.

== History ==
According to the Peace of Westphalia of 1648, the former prince-bishopric was secularized as the Principality of Halberstadt and together with Magdeburg, Minden and Cammin given to the Brandenburg Elector Frederick William I of Hohenzollern as a compensation for Western Pomerania, which in the aftermath of the Brandenburg-Pomeranian conflict he had to cede to Sweden. This agreement was negotiated by Frederick William's representative Joachim Friedrich von Blumenthal, who in reward was appointed Halberstadt's first secular governor.

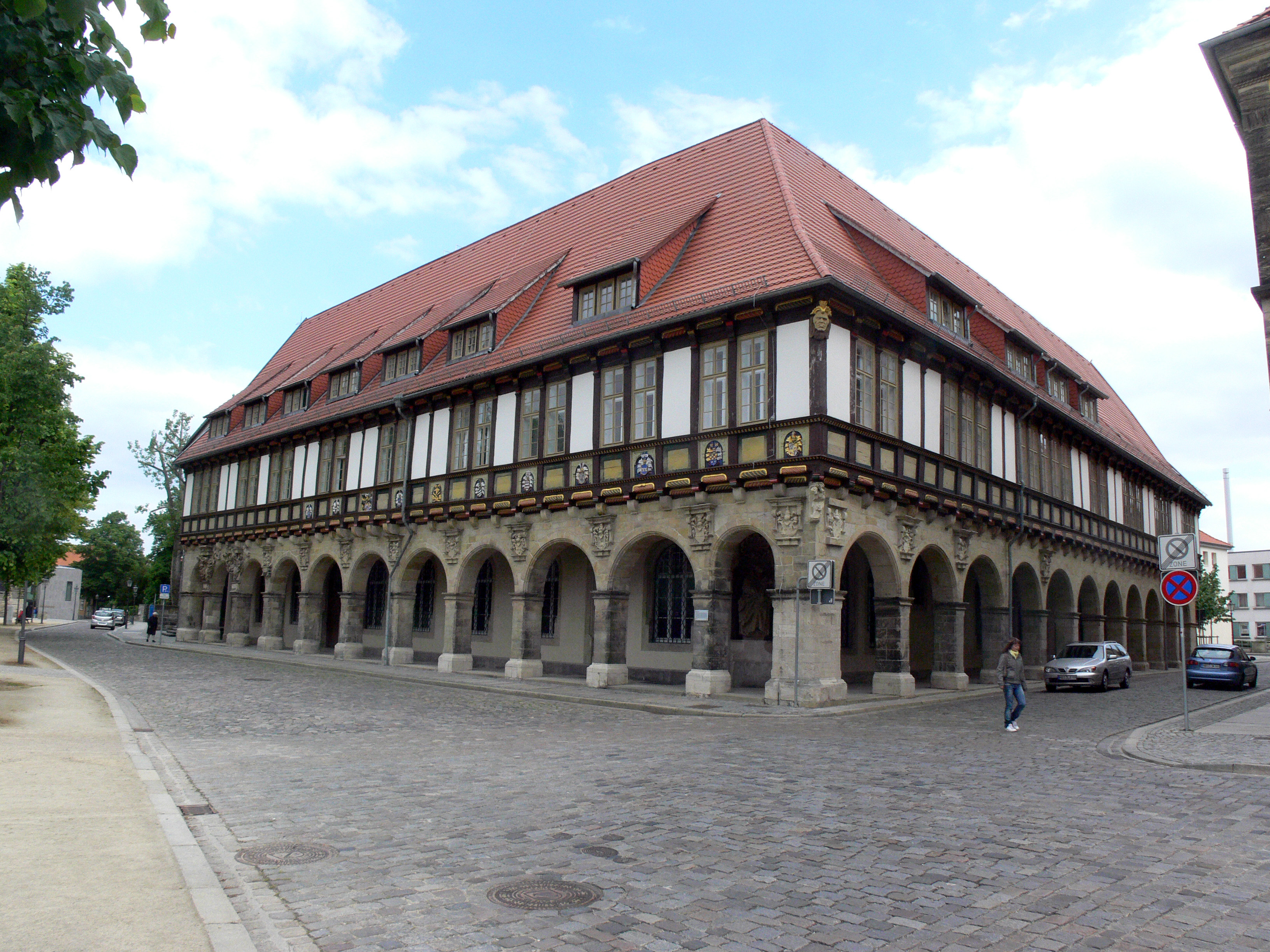
Halberstadt, Dompropstei

The newly created Principality of Halberstadt consisted of the territory around the historic towns of Osterwieck and Halberstadt, the former Principality of Anhalt-Aschersleben, the former County of Regenstein including Heimburg Castle and the County of Falkenstein. The Lordship of Derenburg was added in 1701, Hasserode acquired from Stolberg-Wernigerode in 1714 and after the Congress of Vienna in 1815, the Principality of Halberstadt obtained the Barony of Schauen and the Lordship of Hessenrode. Lost territories included Weferlingen, which King Frederick I in 1703 ceded to his cousin Christian Heinrich of Brandenburg-Bayreuth-Kulmbach, a subdivision of the County of Hohenstein about the same time and Stapelburg left to Stolberg-Wernigerode in 1727.

The Principality of Halberstadt was dissolved according to the 1807 Treaty of Tilsit following Prussia's defeat in the War of the Fourth Coalition. Its territory became part of the Kingdom of Westphalia, a Napoleonic client-state under his younger brother Jérôme. After the French final defeat at Waterloo, the principality was restored to Prussia in 1813 and incorporated into the new Province of Saxony in 1817. Prussian monarchs of the House of Hohenzollern continued to style themselves as "Princes of [...] Halberstadt" until 1918.
