= Reinhard of Blankenburg =

Reinhard of Blankenburg (11th century – 1123) was Bishop of Halberstadt from 1107 to 1123.

He was related to the later comital family. Reinhard may have not have been native in Saxony, but had Saxon relations.

As a young man, he went to Paris to study theology at the school established under the noted theologian, William of Champeaux, at the newly founded Abbey of St. Victor, which William had established.

His nephew, Count Poppo I of Blankenburg, the son of Count Conrad of Blankenburg, seems not to have been from Saxony, but Reinhard assisted him by granting him an estate. Another nephew by his brother, later known as Hugh of St. Victor, entered a local priory of canons regular, but civil unrest in the region led the bishop to advise his nephew to transfer to the abbey where he himself had studied, which Hugh did, and where he gained a reputation as a teacher and mystic.

Reinhard died on 2 March 1123.

Preceded by Frederick I	Bishop of Halberstadt; 1107-1123	Succeeded by Otto of Kuditz
