= Poppo I of Blankenburg =

Count of Regenstein-Blankenburg

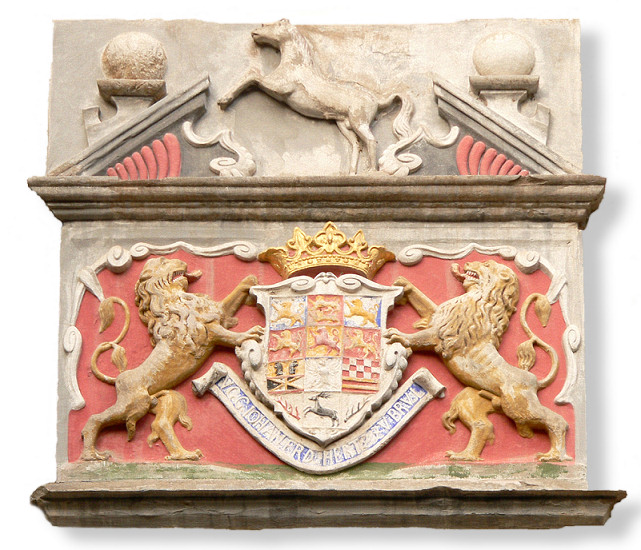
The coat of arms of the two lines started by Poppo's sons (r and l and lower l) at the entrance to Herzberg Castle

Poppo I of Blankenburg (c. 1095–1161 or 1164) probably came from the House of Reginbodonen and was Count of Regenstein-Blankenburg in the Harz in central Germany.

His father was Conrad, Count of Blankenburg. His uncle, Reinhard of Blankenburg, was the Bishop of Halberstadt, and who probably paved the first steps for him.

As the vassal of Emperor Lothair of Supplinburg he exercised count's rights in the Harzgau and was later recorded as a vassal of Henry the Lion. From 1128 he was given the title of comes. His county, which had probably been created by his in-law, Lothair of Supplinburg, was in the eastern Harzgau between the rivers Ilse and Bode. (Lothair was also an in-law of Burchard I of Loccum).

He married Richenza of Boyneburg, the daughter of Count Siegfried III of Boyneburg. They had a son, Conrad, who was the first documented member of the House of Regenstein. Record show that Poppo I also had another son called Siegfred, who was noted for witnessing some of the charters of Duke Henry of Saxony and Bavaria, Urkundel HL, nos 48, 52, and 60. The count also had another son called Reinhard, who settled in Paris as an academic.

In 1163 as the brother-in-law of the late count, Siegfried IV of Boyneburg, who had died in 1144, he brought certain claims against Northeim Abbey, mediated by his wife, Richenza, before Henry the Lion, who had to uphold them. Henry the Lion later purchased the rights to this abbey from his sons.
