= F. L. Lucas =

British writer and classical scholar (1894–1967)

F. L. Lucas OBE
- Lucas in 1957
- Born: Frank Laurence Lucas; 28 December 1894; Hipperholme, Yorkshire, England
- Died: 1 June 1967 (aged 72); Cambridge, England
- Education: Trinity College, Cambridge
- Occupations: Academic, writer, critic
- Writing career
- Genres: Essay, literary criticism, fiction, poetry, drama, polemic, travel writing
- Notable works: The Complete Works of John Webster (1927); Style (1955)
- Notable awards: Benson Medal (1939); OBE (1946)

Frank Laurence Lucas OBE (28 December 1894 – 1 June 1967) was an English classical scholar, literary critic, poet, novelist, playwright, political polemicist, Fellow of King's College, Cambridge, and intelligence officer at Bletchley Park during World War II.

He is now best remembered for his scathing 1923 review of T. S. Eliot's The Waste Land, and for his book Style (1955; revised 1962), an acclaimed guide to recognising and writing good prose. His Tragedy in Relation to Aristotle's 'Poetics' (1927, substantially revised 1957) was for over fifty years a standard introduction. His most important contribution to scholarship was his four-volume old-spelling Complete Works of John Webster (1927), the first collected edition of the Jacobean dramatist since that of Hazlitt the Younger (1857), itself an inferior copy of Dyce (1830). Eliot called Lucas "the perfect annotator", (Note: Lucas's views on the editing and annotation of literary texts, and his answer to the question 'What are the qualities of a perfect edition of an English Literature Classic?', are outlined in his article 'Publishing in Utopia' (New Statesman, 3 October 1925, p.697-8) and in the Preface to his Webster (1927).) and subsequent Webster scholars have been indebted to him, notably the editors of the new Cambridge Webster (1995–2019).

Lucas is also remembered for his anti-fascist campaign in the 1930s, and for his wartime work at Bletchley Park, for which he was appointed an Officer of the Order of the British Empire (OBE).

== Life ==
=== Early life and the War ===
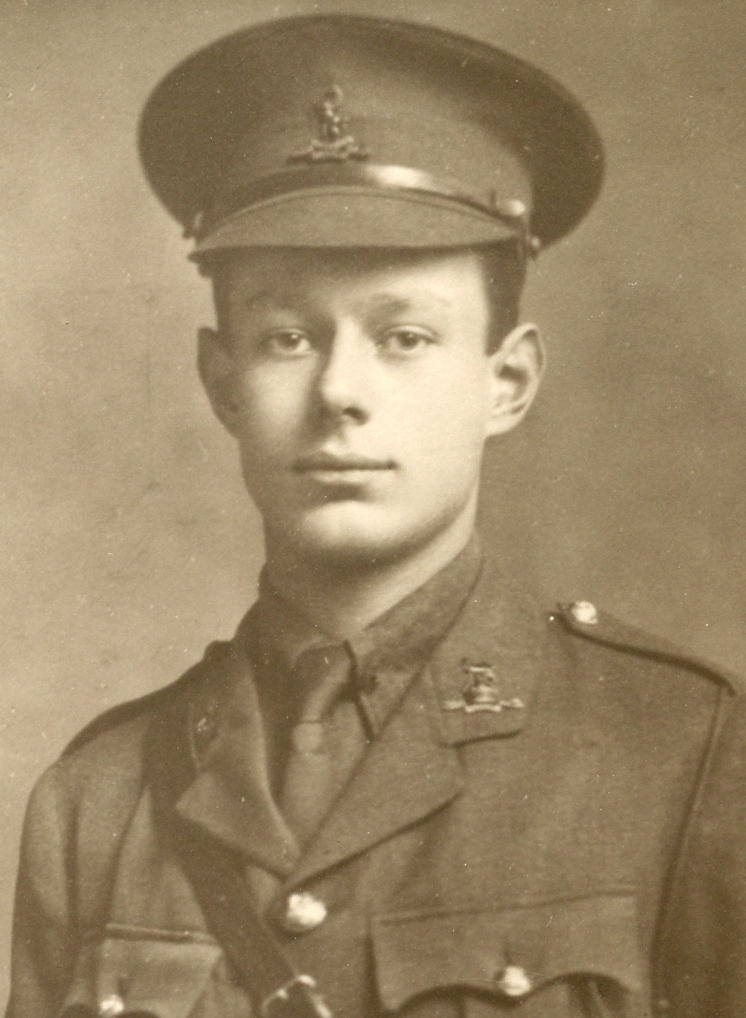
Lucas in 1914

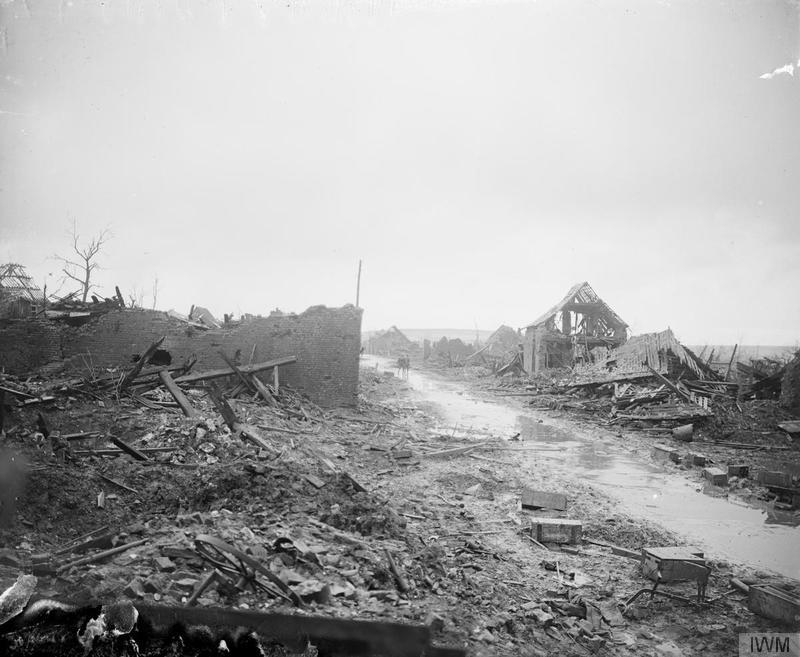
Miraumont-sur-Ancre (March 1917), taken in the British advance of 25 Feb. 1917. The Official History mentions "a daring and resourceful reconnaissance on the crest south of Miraumont by Lt. F. L. Lucas, 7/Royal West Kent, on the afternoon of Feb. 22, conducted whilst British shrapnel was bursting behind him", which brought the first indication of the German retreat to the Hindenburg Line.

F. L. ("Peter") Lucas grew up in Blackheath and was educated at Colfe's (1902–1909), where his father F. W. Lucas (1860–1931) was headmaster, and from 1910 at Rugby, where he was tutored by the Sophocles scholar Robert Whitelaw (1843–1917) in his last year before retirement. He won a scholarship to Trinity College, Cambridge, in 1913 to read for the Classical Tripos, adding the Pitt Scholarship and Porson Prize in 1914. In January 1914 he was elected Apostle – the last Apostle elected before the War – coming under the influence of G. E. Moore. Believing Cambridge threatened with the fate of Louvain, he volunteered, aged 19, in October 1914 and was commissioned in November, serving from 1915 as second lieutenant in the 7th Battalion The Royal West Kent Regiment in France. From August 1915 he was in the Somme trenches opposite Fricourt and Mametz; he was wounded by shrapnel in May 1916. "One simply gapes at the gigantic capriciousness of things," he wrote to John Maynard Keynes in October of that year, "waiting our own turn to disappear in the Cyclops' maw." He returned to the front as lieutenant in January 1917, went into battle near Grandcourt on 17 February in the Ancre Offensive, was mentioned in despatches on 22 February, and was gassed on 4 March. In all he spent seventeen months in war-hospitals, among them Dorchester House. By September 1917 he felt that the cause of honour and justice had been lost in the lust of Victory ("We were too ready to go on fighting without offering terms"). Passed fit for garrison duty at Chatham (3rd Battalion Royal West Kent HQ), he sought the help of fellow-Apostle Keynes to return to France, and from August 1918 to the Armistice he was Staff lieutenant in the Intelligence Corps (Third Army HQ), examining German prisoners near Bapaume and Le Quesnoy. His life hung in the balance in November 1918 shortly after the Armistice, when his lung wounds reopened in the influenza pandemic. (Note: Lucas's war memoirs are contained in his Journal Under the Terror, 1938 (1939) [pp. 12–19, 38–39, 95–96, 235–236, 257–259], in The Greatest Problem (1960) [pp. 26–27, 143–151], and in the final chapters of The River Flows (1926).) He returned to Cambridge in January 1919. Fell-walking in the Lake District "on Easter morning [1919] on Kidsty Pike, between Hawes Water and Hayes Water, a blinding spring sun on snowy ridge beyond ridge, from Fairfield to Blencathra, brought a moment of such ecstatic intoxication that, were I a mystic, I should have called it a mystical experience."

=== Career ===
Resuming his undergraduate studies, Lucas won a Chancellor's Medal for Classics and the Browne Medal (1920), and revived meetings of the Apostles, suspended since 1914, becoming Society Secretary and contributing nineteen papers. He was elected to a Fellowship at King's College in 1920 before he had completed his degree, Keynes paying for him to holiday in Greece with Sebastian Sprott on the eve of his Tripos. He took a starred first (Note: At that time a pass in the fifteen papers of Part I of the Classical Tripos was equivalent to a B.A. degree. Lucas proceeded to his M.A. in 1923.) and began his career as a Classics lecturer in October 1920. In the spring of 1921 he spent three months in Greece as a student of the British School at Athens, locating the site of the Battle of Pharsalus in Thessaly (see Pharsalus below). Back in Cambridge he switched that year to teaching for the English Tripos (instituted in 1919). He was a member of the Cambridge University English Faculty (as it later became) from 1921 to 1939 and from 1945 to 1962, and a university Reader in English from 1947 to 1962. At the invitation of Desmond MacCarthy, literary editor of the New Statesman, Lucas reviewed poetry and criticism for that journal from 1922 to 1926, having begun his career as reviewer with the Athenaeum in 1920–21, its last year. Early reviews and essays were collected in his Authors Dead and Living (1926). Among them was a review of Housman's Last Poems (1922) that, unusually, met with the approval of the poet himself. His move from Classics to English and his edition of Webster (1927) were inspired in large part by J. T. Sheppard's March 1920 Marlowe Society production of The White Devil, which made a powerful impression on him: "What could make the Cambridge production of The White Devil in 1920 seem, to at least two who saw it then without preconceptions, the most staggering performance they had ever known?" he asked in the New Statesman. (The production had been swift-moving, in the Elizabethan manner, with minimal scenery and with emphasis on "beautiful poetry beautifully spoken".) "[Lucas] has been lucky in finding a writer [Webster] who takes his standpoint," T. E. Lawrence remarked, "and sums up life rather in his fashion." Lucas' preference, however, lay with Comparative Literature, and after Webster he turned to his Studies French and English (1934; revised 1950) (he was Membre Correspondant Honoraire de L'Institut Littéraire et Artistique de France), and later to studies of Scandinavian literature. He served as committee member for the Cambridge Greek Play (1921–33) and continued to write on Greek and Latin literature. As part-time Librarian at King's (1922–36) he accessioned the donated papers of Rupert Brooke. His students at King's included George Rylands, John Hayward, F. E. Halliday, H. C. A. "Tom" Gaunt, Alan Clutton-Brock, Julian Bell, Desmond Flower, Ken'ichi Yoshida, and Winton Dean. By Cambridge English students in general he was known as "F. L.".

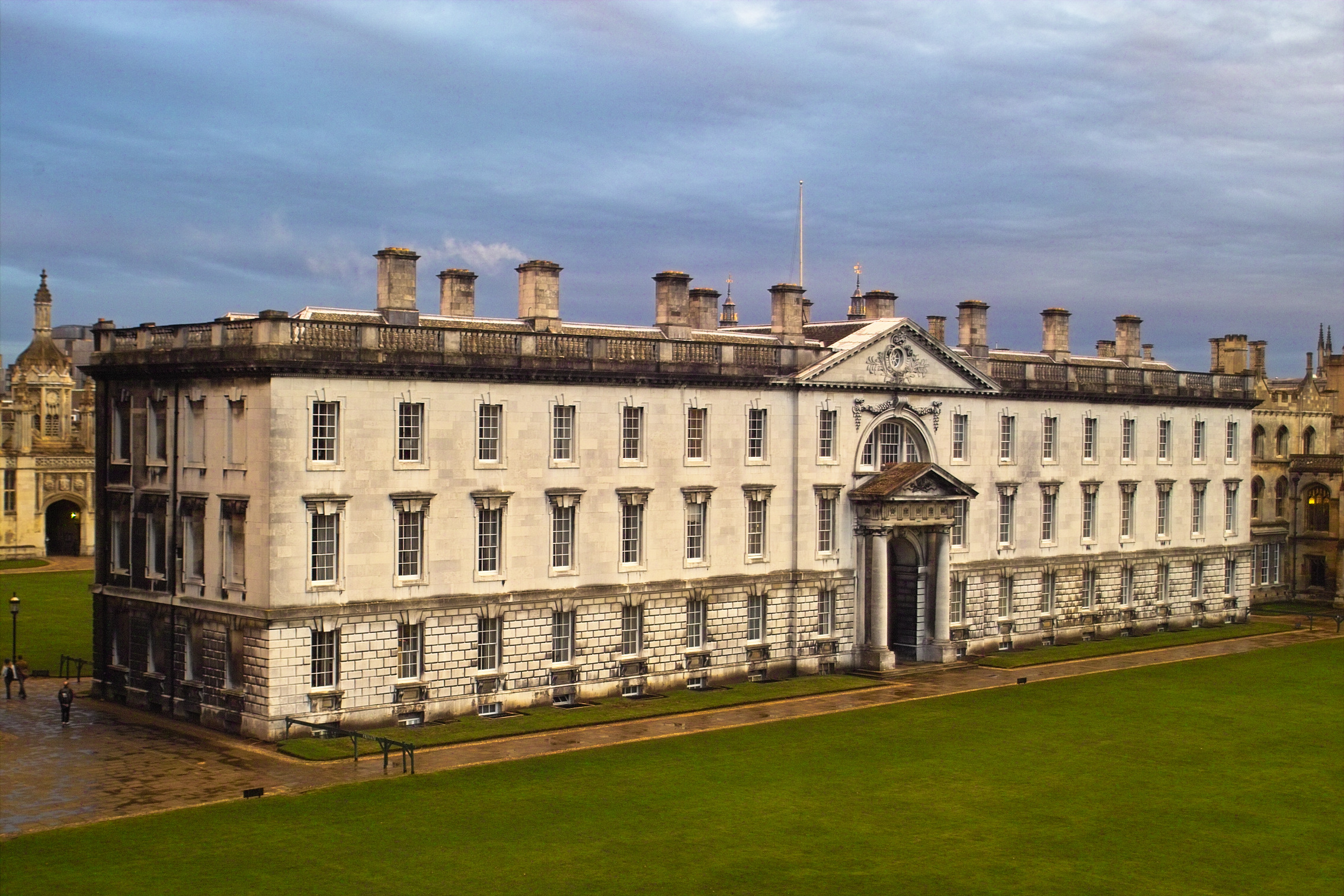
The Fellows' Building, King's. Of King's Lucas wrote: "Never in my experience of half a lifetime has it declined for one moment from that tradition of humanism, tolerance, and freedom in which I believe it unsurpassed throughout the Universities of the world."

Following the publication of his Webster, scholars turned to him for editorial advice: he helped in the preparation of Hayward's Nonesuch Donne (1929), Housman's More Poems (1936), Theodore Redpath's Songs and Sonets of John Donne (1956), and Ingram and Redpath's Shakespeare's Sonnets (1964). (Note: "F. L. Lucas ... who scrutinised almost all our edition with keen eye, saved us from some definite mistakes, and made a great number of perceptive suggestions which have vastly benefited the edition." W. G. Ingram & Theodore Redpath, Shakespeare's Sonnets (London, 1964), p.xv) He also performed an editorial and advisory role for Christopher Sandford at the Golden Cockerel Press, where he introduced Victor Scholderer's New Hellenic typeface (1937). Four of his verse translations from Greek and Latin, with engravings by John Buckland Wright, were published in collectors' editions by the Golden Cockerel Press and Folio Society. In the middle years of his career he was in demand as an invitation lecturer, giving seven BBC wireless talks in 1930, on Dorothy Osborne and on the Victorian Poets, delivering the 1933 Warton Lecture on English Poetry to the British Academy, lecturing at the Royal Institution on Classicism and Romanticism (1935) and at the Royal Society of Literature on travel writing (1937), and, as part of a British Council drive to counter Soviet propaganda, lecturing in German on European literature to packed halls at the British Information Centre in West Berlin in October 1948 during the Berlin Blockade.

In later years Lucas won acclaim for his translations from the classics (see Verse translation below) and for his book Style (1955). He also turned encyclopedist, contributing articles on 'Poetry', 'Epic', 'Lyric', 'Ode', 'Elegy' and 'Pastoral' to the 15-volume 1950 Chambers's Encyclopaedia, among others, and serving on the editorial board of the Encyclopædia Britannica's Great Books of the Western World series (1952). As he told Nikos Kazantzakis, who visited him in Cambridge after the War, Je ne lis plus; je relis [:I no longer read; I reread].

For Lucas's anti-fascist campaign in the Thirties and his wartime service in Intelligence, see Appeasement and Bletchley Park below.

=== Personal life ===
From February 1921 to 1929 Lucas was married to the novelist E. B. C. Jones (1893–1966), known as "Topsy" to her friends. She was the sister-in-law of his former supervisor at Trinity, Donald Robertson; he got to know her after reading and admiring her first novel, Quiet Interior (1920). Jones dedicated two novels to Lucas and based two characters on him – Hugh Sexton, gassed in the War, in The Singing Captives (1922), and Oliver in The Wedgwood Medallion (1923), a Cambridge classics graduate now studying the Elizabethan drama. Lucas based the character Margaret Osborne in The River Flows (1926) on her – a semi-autobiographical first novel that shifts some of his experiences of 1919–1920 to 1913–1915. The character Hugh Fawcett ("the best brain in the Foreign Office" but not much use as a matchmaker) was based on Keynes. Through the Apostles Lucas was associated with the Bloomsbury Group, (Note: "Then I went to Trinity, and talked for some hours with Lucas, who appeared to me decidedly fascinating – though exactly why I'm blessed if I know." – Lytton Strachey, May 1920, The Letters of Lytton Strachey, ed. Paul Levy (London, 2005)) Virginia Woolf describing him to Ottoline Morrell as "pure Cambridge: clean as a breadknife, and as sharp". To Lucas, interviewed in 1958, Bloomsbury had seemed "a jungle":

Book dedications
Euripides and his Influence	1923	E. B. C. Jones
The River Flows	1926	Sebastian Sprott
Works of John Webster	1927	John Maynard Keynes
Tragedy in Relation to Aristotle's 'Poetics'	1927	Clive Bell
Time and Memory	1929	E. M. Forster
Cécile	1930	T. E. Lawrence
Marionettes	1930	Desmond MacCarthy
Eight Victorian Poets	1930	John Hayward
The Art of Dying	1930	Virginia Woolf
The Wild Tulip	1932	Julian Bell
Alfred, Lord Tennyson	1932	Anne Barnes
Thomas Lovell Beddoes	1932	George Barnes
George Crabbe	1933	Roger Fry
D. G. Rossetti	1933	Ken'ichi Yoshida
The Bear Dances	1933	Leon M. Lion
Studies French and English	1934	Marie Mauron
The Decline and Fall of the Romantic Ideal	1936	Gordon Bottomley
The Delights of Dictatorship	1938	Henry Nevinson
The Iliad. Verse translation in selection	1950	D. W. Lucas
Literature and Psychology	1951	Hilda Stekel
Greek Poetry for Everyman	1951	George Boas
Greek Drama for Everyman	1954	Herbert Grierson
Style	1955	Charles Tennyson
The Search for Good Sense	1958	Harry Hinsley

The society of Virginia and Leonard Woolf, Duncan Grant, Clive and Vanessa Bell, and Lytton Strachey was far from being in the ordinary sense a happy family. They were intensely and rudely critical of each other. They were the sort of people who would read letters addressed to others. They tormented each other with endless love affairs. In real crises they could be generous, but in ordinary affairs of life they were anything but kind ... Dickinson and Forster were not really Bloomsbury. They were soft-hearted and kind. Bloomsbury was certainly not that.

Jones's admiration for George Rylands undermined the marriage by 1927. After affairs with Dora Carrington (d. 1932) and Shelagh Clutton-Brock (d. 1936), in December 1932 Lucas married the 21-year-old Girton Classics graduate and sculptor Prudence Dalzell Wilkinson (1911–1944). His travel writings, accounts of their long walks through landscapes with literary associations, date mostly from the years of his second marriage (1932–1939): From Olympus to the Styx (1934), a book on their 1933 walking tour of Greece (one of five journeys he made to that country (Note: 1920, 1921, 1933, 1937 and 1954.)); 'Iceland: in practice', a travelogue in The Cornhill on their 1934 journey to the saga sites, included in the original edition of his The Decline and Fall of the Romantic Ideal (1936); (Note: The 1935 Cornhill travelogue was read by Auden and MacNeice before their summer 1936 Iceland journey. Auden and MacNeice, Letters from Iceland (London, 1937), p.48.) and journal-entries on their visits to Norway, Ireland, Scotland and France. In these years they were frequent visitors to the home in Saint-Rémy-de-Provence of Marie Mauron, whose Provençal stories Lucas translated. From Olympus to the Styx argues for the return of the Elgin Marbles:

Considering what was to come, the much-abused 'theft' of the sculptures from the Acropolis by Lord Elgin was an undoubted blessing, though it was carelessly carried out, especially in removing the Caryatid from the Erechtheum; it would none the less be a graceful act for England to return them now to Athens.

Prudence Lucas, as well as sharing these interests, designed the costumes and sets for the first production (Garrick Theatre, Stockport, 1938) of his Icelandic tragedy The Lovers of Gudrun (1935). Her nervous breakdown in 1938 is touched on in Lucas's Journal Under the Terror, 1938 (1939); Lucas sought help from, among others, Wilhelm Stekel, whom he met in London in 1939, but the rift proved irreparable. (Note: Prudence ('Prudey') Dalzell Wilkinson, born 25 May 1911 in Shanghai; lived near Ballyronan, County Londonderry, which she revisited with Lucas in 1931 (Poems, 1935, p.61-67; Journal Under the Terror, 1938, p.130-137); moved to West Indies after 1939 divorce; died in Trinidad, 1944 ('The Nervous State', player.sheffield.ac.uk/events/nervous-state). Photograph of Prudence Lucas at Monk's House, 1933, in Maggie Humm, Bloomsbury Photographs, Yale, 2024, p.128.) The emphasis on psychology in his post-war books – Literature and Psychology (1951), Style (1955), The Search for Good Sense (1958), The Art of Living (1959), the essay on 'Happiness' in The Greatest Problem (1960), The Drama of Ibsen and Strindberg (1962), The Drama of Chekhov, Synge, Yeats and Pirandello (1963) – reflects an interest shared with his third wife (1940–1967), the Swedish psychologist Elna Kallenberg (1906–2003), whom he married in 1940 – "the stranger who came to me from beyond the sea when I most needed her" (Elna Kallenberg, a friend of Hilda Stekel, had flown from Sweden, with special permission from the Home Office, to join him in late 1939). They had two children, Signe and Sigurd.

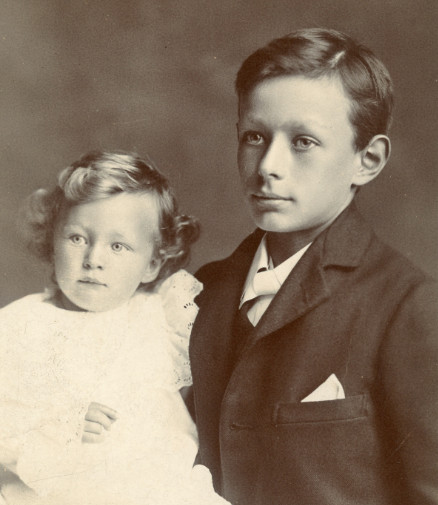
D. W. Lucas and F. L. Lucas, c. 1906

Lucas returned time and again in his books to the theme of happiness, and in 1960 summed up his thoughts on happiness thus:

Vitality of mind and body; the activity to employ and maintain them; the zest and curiosity that they can animate; freedom to travel widely in nature and art, in countries of the world and countries of the mind; human affections; and the gift of gaiety – these seem to me, then, the main causes of happiness. I am surprised to find how few and simple they are.

Lucas lived at 7 Camden Place, Cambridge, from 1921 to 1925; at 20 West Road, Cambridge from 1925 to 1939; at High Mead, Great Brickhill from 1939 to 1945; and again at 20 West Road, Cambridge, from 1945 until his death in 1967. The dissident Czech academic Otakar Vočadlo (1895–1974), Lucas's Prague correspondent in 1938–39 (see Appeasement below) and a concentration camp survivor, celebrated his restoration, during the Prague Spring of 1968, to his Chair of English at Prague, by giving a course of lectures on Webster in memory of Lucas, whose support for the Czech cause in 1938–39 had not been forgotten.

D. W. Lucas, the classical scholar (1905–85), Fellow of King's College, Cambridge, University Director of Studies in Classics, and Perceval Maitland Laurence Reader in Classics, was F. L. Lucas's brother.

== Literary criticism ==
=== Approach ===
Except in reviews of work by contemporaries, Lucas adopted the historical and biographical approach to criticism and examined the views of earlier critics, whose dogmatism he was swift to rebut. He increasingly linked his studies to developments in psychology, notably in Literature and Psychology (1951). "The real 'unwritten laws'", he observed, "seem to me those of human psychology." Centrally, he discussed the writer's psychology as revealed through style. "Even science", he noted, "has invented no pickle for embalming a man like style."

The poets to whom he returned most often in publications were Tennyson (1930, 1932, 1947, 1957) and Housman (1926, 1933, 1936, 1960), but he ranged widely over Classical, European and English literature. Conscious that books can influence for good or ill, he admired authors he saw as defenders of sanity and good sense – men like Montaigne and Montesquieu – or as compassionate realists, like Homer in the Iliad, Euripides, Hardy, Ibsen and Chekhov. "Life is 'indivisible'", he wrote.

A public tends to get the literature it deserves: a literature, to get the public it deserves. The values men pursue in each, affect the other. They turn in a vicious, or a virtuous, circle. Only a fine society could have bred Homer: and he left it finer for hearing him.

His criticism, while acknowledging that morality is historically relative, was thus values-based. "Writers can make men feel, not merely see, the values that endure." Believing that too many modern writers encouraged men and women to flee to unreason, decadence and barbarism, he condemned the trahisons des clercs of the twentieth century, and used his lectures and writing to campaign for a responsible use of intellectual freedom. "One may question whether real civilisation is so safely afloat," he wrote in his last published letter (1966), "that we can afford to use our pens for boring holes in the bottom of it." The writer or artist serving up "slapdash nightmares out of his Unconscious", "in an age morbidly avid of uncivilised irreticence", not only exhibited his own neuroses, but fed neurosis in others. One contemporary writer he admired was "sane and balanced, intelligent and civilised" Somerset Maugham, whom he regarded as a between-the-lines moralist like Maupassant. The serious note in his criticism was counterbalanced by wit and urbanity, by lively anecdote and quotation, and by a gift for startling imagery and epigram.

Literary critics, too, had to take more responsibility. "Much cant gets talked", Lucas noted of the Structuralists, "by critics who care more for the form and organisation of a work than for its spirit, its content, its supreme moments." What he wrote about Housman's Name and Nature of Poetry in 1933 (though he contested some of its ideas) sums up what he himself aspired to as a literary critic: "… the kind of critical writing that best justifies itself before the brevity of life; that itself adds new data to our experience as well as arguing about the old; that happily combines, in a word, philosophy with autobiography, psychology with a touch of poetry – of the 'poetic' imagination. It can make acceptable even common sense. There are sentences here which recall the clear-cut Doric strength of the Lives of the Poets ..."

His Cambridge colleague T. R. Henn noted that Lucas's approach and style were influenced by the Strachey of Books and Characters (1922).

=== Controversy ===
Lucas's impatience with the "obscurantism" and coterie-appeal of much modern poetry made him in the interwar years one of the foremost opponents of the new schools. "As for 'profundity'," he wrote, "it is not uncommonly found also in dry wells; which may likewise contain little but obscurity and rubbish." He opposed also what he saw as the narrow dogmatism of the new critics, those "tight-lipped Calvins of art", as he called them, of Criterion and Scrutiny. Discussions of I. A. Richards's criticism appear in his essay 'English Literature' in the volume University Studies: Cambridge 1933 and in Chapter 4 of his Decline and Fall of the Romantic Ideal (1936), and of Eliot's in the 1929 essay 'Modern Criticism', reprinted in his Studies French and English (1934). An anonymous New Statesman review (29 December 1928) of Eliot's criticism, however, to which F. R. Leavis replied apparently believing it was by Lucas, and which Leavis's biographer says "was certainly by Lucas", was in fact by Richard Ellis Roberts. Lucas had stopped regular reviewing for the New Statesman in 1926 and never reviewed anonymously. (Note: The New Statesman published 48 signed Lucas reviews from April 1922 to Jan. 1926. He returned, briefly, for two signed reviews of authors he found congenial, Browning (22 Nov. 1928) and Beddoes (10 Dec. 1928), and for a review of Julian Bell's writings edited by Quentin Bell (26 Nov. 1938).) His critique of Q. D. Leavis's Fiction and the Reading Public (1932) in University Studies: Cambridge 1933 was described by F. R. Leavis's biographer as "improper": "senior academics do not use quasi-official publications to attack graduate students". (The volume, though printed by the University Press, was not published there; its editor stressed that the contributions were "unofficial" glimpses into the "intense mental activity" of each Cambridge department; and published theses are not normally considered exempt from criticism.)

=== Lucas and Eliot ===
Lucas's 1923 review of The Waste Land, much reprinted in the decades since his death, was omitted from his Authors Dead and Living (1926), a collection of New Statesman pieces, probably because he had ended by saying the poem should be left to sink. Remarks elsewhere confirm that he had not changed his opinion. (Note: Sentences repeating opinions from the Waste Land review appear in 'The Progress of Poetry' in Authors Dead and Living (p.286) and Journal Under the Terror, 1938 (p.172).) The Letters of T. S. Eliot includes correspondence between Eliot and Lucas from the mid-1920s but no reference to the review. Described by F. W. Bateson as "brilliantly wrong-headed", the piece is better known today than it was during Lucas's lifetime. Historians of The New Statesman have regretted that Desmond MacCarthy invited Lucas to review modern poetry, one of them declaring Lucas "a disastrous choice" for a Waste Land review. (Disastrous, that is, for the journal's avant-garde image.) His only other comment on the poem occurs in his essay 'English Literature' in the volume University Studies: Cambridge 1933, where he contested Richards' view of it in Science and Poetry (1926): "The Waste Land is praised [by Richards] for its 'complete severence' from all beliefs, when it is really a yearning cry for them, and at its close some sort of faith is so clearly impending that it has been praised by others as a great religious poem (such are the triumphs of obscurity)."

After 1923, though attacking obscurantism in general terms, Lucas largely ignored Eliot's poetry, aside from a retrospective dig in 1942 at 'The Hollow Men' ("hollow men whimpering under prickly pear trees, conceited still amid their grovellings because a prickly pear remains an exotic and highly intellectual plant") and at 'Sweeney among the Nightingales' ("the nightingales of Aeschylus now exhibit to a ravished public their 'droppings'; for to the sewer all things are sewer"). (Note: Of the "ragged claws" lines in 'Prufrock' he wrote more playfully: "One modern poet, in verses peculiarly admired, has lamented that he was not born a healthy lobster". (Lucas, The Criticism of Poetry, Oxford University Press, 1933; p.24.)) On the later Eliot he was silent. He had no time for mystical poetry, regarding religion as an aberration of the human mind.

In 1928 Lucas had been stung by Eliot's review in the Times Literary Supplement criticising aspects of the Introduction to his Webster. He replied vigorously in the same journal, only to find Eliot extending his criticisms in another review in The Criterion. Lucas counter-attacked in his 1929 essay 'Modern Criticism', ridiculing Eliot's literary-critical obiter dicta and oracular tone. In later editions of his essays, Eliot made minor changes or added clarifications to sentences Lucas had ridiculed, and praised the textual and historical scholarship of the 1927 Webster. Lucas left the Introduction out of his 1958 revised editions of the two major plays, (Note: His later views appear in his Webster article in The Concise Encyclopaedia of English and American Poets and Poetry, eds. Stephen Spender and Donald Hall (London, 1963).) but demand for the unabridged 1927 Webster continued, and it was reprinted on both sides of the Atlantic in 1966.

=== Reputation ===
Lucas's standing as a literary critic was probably at its highest in the 1930s. "In three respects," wrote the Times Literary Supplement in 1934, "Lucas rises pre-eminent from the crowd of contemporary critics: in his care for style, for dignity and grace in his method of presentment: in his learning in the literature of several languages: and in the balance, the sanity of his judgment." (Note: When the Cambridge chair in English fell vacant in 1944, Lucas was among those considered. "I had a long talk with Nichol Smith," Sir Anthony Bevir wrote to the Vice-Chancellor in December 1945, "and asked him frankly his opinion about all the names which had been mentioned, and it entirely confirmed the general impression which I had got in Cambridge, namely that Lucas was probably the ablest man but that his judgement was uncertain and his work, though at times brilliant, not always of permanence." (From a 1945 manuscript in Cambridge University Library, quoted in Stefan Collini, Literature and Learning: a History of English Studies in Britain, Oxford University Press, 2025, p.357).) Post-war, reviewers were often more hostile. Many post-war reviews amounted to reprisals by the Leavisite camp: "There is an air of breezy Bloomsbury superficiality and cultural omniscience about this book that is distressing," wrote one. "His is the type of over-cultivated fuddy-duddy mind that has done – and is doing – great damage to our whole culture in general and to literary appreciation in particular." Probably because, psychoanalytic literary criticism aside, Lucas scorned most new trends – he described the critical theory of the 1950s as "largely pseudo-scientific bubble-blowing" – his criticism has long been out of fashion and is mostly out of print.

"His criticism is the table-talk of a man of the world of fine taste and faultless memory. And he has to an exceptional degree the gift of creating and communicating an enjoyment of literature. It is impossible to put his books down without a grateful determination to reread those masterpieces of literature he describes and illustrates so engagingly."

― F. W. Bateson, Review of English Studies, 1938

"The literary world has passed on," wrote L. P. Wilkinson, "but that does not mean that what supervened was better; and just because of his uncompromising brilliance the whirligig of time may bring in his criticism again. His Style (1955) has a permanent value in any case, unaffected by trends." His two earliest books, Seneca and Elizabethan Tragedy (1922) – his Fellowship dissertation, dedicated to his mother, Ada Ruth Blackmur (1865–1948), who at his request had taught him to read by four – and Euripides and His Influence (1923), neither superseded in similar concise form, continue to be reprinted. The editors of the new Cambridge Webster (1995–2007) praise "his customary accuracy and astuteness" in matters of dating, authorship, and textual scholarship. "With its voluminous and marvellously wide-ranging notes," writes D. C. Gunby, "Lucas's four-volume, old-spelling edition remains essential reading for those who love scholarship and, more, love the plays of John Webster".

== Verse translation ==
THE SPRING OF HERMES
Beside the grey sea-shingle, here at the cross-roads'

meeting,

I, Hermes, stand and wait, where the windswept orchard

grows.

I give, to wanderers weary, rest from the road and

greeting:

Cool and unpolluted from my spring the water

flows.

– Anyte of Tegea, Anth. Pal., IX.314, trans. Lucas

Lucas dedicated much of his time to making classical (mainly Greek) poetry accessible through verse translations. His companion volumes Greek Poetry for Everyman (1951) and Greek Drama for Everyman (1954) contain some 20,000 lines. No single translator had attempted before to bring together in homogeneous volumes so much of the best of Greek poetry from Homer to the 6th century A.D., with the introductions and notes needed by the non-classicist. The translations were praised for their grace and fidelity – "the sense and the imagery are minutely reproduced" – and were hailed by the press as Cambridge's single-handed answer to the [collaborative] Oxford Book of Greek Verse in Translation. Reviewers of the first volume, Greek Poetry, generally preferred his translations of lyric, Alexandrian and later poetry to the 7,000 rhymed lines from Homer, which were omitted from the second edition (Everyman's Library, 1966). Of the second volume, Greek Drama, a reviewer wrote: "Lucas makes the plays deceptively easy to read and appreciate by smoothing away the austerities and complexities of the Greek – qualities which some modernists conscientiously preserve or even exaggerate." "His translations have no striking originality of style," commented A. H. Coxon, "but they are accurate, graceful, and dignified, and they have the merit of not veiling the Greek, so that for long stretches the poetic quality of the original shines through." Lucas's 1960 essay 'Translation' sets out his guiding principles on the subject.

== Original writing ==
=== Novels ===
Of Lucas's novels the best received was Cécile (1930), a tale of love, society and politics in the France of 1775–1776. Lucas dedicated the book to T. E. Lawrence, a friend and admirer. He wrote two further historical novels, Doctor Dido (1938), set in Cambridge in 1792–1812, and The English Agent: A Tale of the Peninsular War (1969), set in Spain in 1808; and a novella, The Woman Clothed with the Sun (1937), on the Buchanites of the 1780s–90s. The three novels focus on a love-affair between an Englishman and a Frenchwoman (Lucas was a self-confessed gallomane); the Scots novella takes the form of an account, written by a Scottish minister in middle age, of his youthful bewitchment by Elspeth Buchan and of his curious sojourn among the Buchanites. A theme common to all four is the tension between fragile 18th-century rationalism and, in varying forms, Romantic "enthusiasm" and unreason. For his semi-autobiographical first novel, The River Flows (1926), see Personal Life above.

=== Poems ===
As a poet Lucas was a polished ironist. Early collections (Time and Memory, 1929, Marionettes, 1930, Poems, 1935) were mostly personal lyrics or satires, but he came to specialise in dramatic monologues and narrative poems based on historical episodes "that seem lastingly alive" (Messene Redeemed, 1940; From Many Times and Lands, 1953). His First World War poems, including Morituri – August 1915, on the road from Morlancourt' (1935) and (below) ' "The Night is Chilly but not Dark" ' (1935), offer a retrospect of his experiences at the front.

On nights when the moon creeps shrouded up the sky
And hedge and holt lie glimmering ghostly grey,
A voice still whispers in me, far away –
A good night, this, for wiring – and suddenly
There rises from the dead that shadowy hell,
The barbed-wire rasps, uncoiling through my hand,
The flares dance flickering over no-man's-land,
A dull machine-gun raps from La Boisselle.
Then fades the phantom, and once more I know
Our spider-webs of wire are rust by now,
Our battlefields reconquered by the plough,
And hands that worked with mine, dust long ago.

The inclusion of 'Beleaguered Cities' (1929) in various mid-twentieth century anthologies of English verse made it probably Lucas's best-known poem. Others that have gained currency through anthologies include 'The Destined Hour' (1953), a re-telling in verse of the old 'appointment in Samarra' fable, and 'Spain 1809', the story of a village woman's courage during the French occupation in the Peninsular War. The romantic lyric, 'Her answer, in after years' (1935), is a nostalgic look back at his travels. His most ambitious poem was Ariadne (1932), an epic re-working, in the light of modern psychology, of the Labyrinth myth, with the Minotaur a sadistic Minos in a bull-mask. Extracts from the poem were read on the BBC Home Service in 1934.

=== Drama ===
Lucas's most successful play was the thriller Land's End (1935), set in Cornwall in the mid-1930s (Westminster Theatre, February–March 1938, 29 performances, with Cathleen Nesbitt, Cecil Trouncer and Alan Napier among the cast). One of Paul Scofield's earliest roles was in the Birmingham Rep's revival of the play in March–April 1945. Lucas's radio play The Siren was first broadcast on the BBC Third Programme in 1948, with Catherine Lacey, Frith Banbury and Deryck Guyler in the cast; a second production followed on the Home Service in 1949, with Cathleen Nesbitt and Hugh Burden. The play dramatises George Sand's amorous escapades in Paris and Italy with Alfred de Musset and Dr. Pietro Pagello – the subject of the 1999 film Les Enfants du Siècle. His political drama The Bear Dances: A Play in Three Acts was the first dramatisation of the Soviets on London's West-end stage (Garrick Theatre, 1932, with Elena Miramova, Abraham Sofaer and Olga Lindo). This play, though it closed early in London, was revived by various repertory theatres in the North of England in the later 1930s. It was an attempt at ideological disinfectant, written at a time when Cambridge University (in Lucas's words) "grew full of very green young men going very Red".

== History, politics and society ==
=== Pharsalus ===
Outside literature, Lucas is remembered for his solution to one of the more contentious problems of ancient topography. His "north-bank" thesis on the location of the Battle of Pharsalus (48 B.C.), based on his 1921 solo field-trip to Thessaly and on a re-examination of the sources, dismissed a dozen previous theories and is now widely accepted by historians. John D. Morgan in his definitive 'Palae-pharsalus – the Battle and the Town' writes: "My reconstruction is similar to Lucas's, and in fact I borrow one of his alternatives for the line of the Pompeian retreat. Lucas's theory has been subjected to many criticisms, but has remained essentially unshaken."

=== Appeasement ===
"Are our minds clear, or are we drifting foggily into another 1914? It was because England hedged then, that we all but perished in the ditch beyond."
– F. L. Lucas, The Week-end Review, 16 Sept. 1933

In the 1930s Lucas was widely known for his political letters to the British Press with their outspoken attacks on the policy that came to be known as appeasement. Following the inaction of the League over Manchuria, he called repeatedly for "a League within the League", of nations pledged to uphold international law and oppose aggression. "Since the War," he wrote in 1933, "British policy has been shuffling, timid, ignoble." Having read Mein Kampf in the unexpurgated original and taken its threats as a statement of intent, he urged in September 1933 that Nazi Germany be prevented from re-arming. "Versailles was monstrous", he wrote in The Week-end Review,

"but one thing surely comes first: Germany must not be allowed to re-arm. How prevent it? By an international police-force? It would be ideal. Unfortunately it does not exist. The French have urged it. We in our muddle-headedness want neither it nor the alternative – war. Are we prepared to see France do its work instead and take action in Germany? – or are we going to sit sanctimoniously on the fence, disapproving, but secretly relieved? I devoutly hope the first. Germany must not re-arm; even if the French had to invade it once every five years, that would be better than the alternative."

This letter struck some readers as "brutal", and marked him as a hard-liner. The pro-appeasement Times refused to publish him after 1935 (he described the Editor's office as "an annexe of the German embassy"); and when he condemned the Italian invasion of Abyssinia and the democracies' inadequate response, he received abusive and threatening replies from Fascists, including one from Ezra Pound (he put Pound's letter on display at the Cambridge Anti-Fascist Exhibition). In the years following he varied his arguments, but not their message. A hatred of war, he urged in 1936, "can be no reason for being false to ourselves, in the name of an aimless amiability that cries 'peace' where there is none." By 1937 the emphasis was on the dishonesty of British policy: "We have not kept agreements we made; we have made agreements we should not; we have tried to cheat our way to security, and now the security proves a cheat. We have forgotten the wisdom which says that since we cannot foresee where any road will lead in the end, we should stick to the straight and honest one." Despite the prevailing pacifism of the time – and he exchanged views with "passive pacifists" in the correspondence-columns – such sentiments struck a chord. "This is the voice of the England I love," wrote a correspondent from Prague in 1938, (Note: Lucas's Prague correspondent was Otakar Vočadlo (1895-1974).) "and for whose soul I was trembling when I heard about the welcome given Mr Chamberlain on his return from Munich."

Splendid Isolation

( "The British policeman should stick to his own beat." – Evening Standard, 22 April 1935 )

...
Paris may pass in gas and flame and blood –
We shall sit safe behind our sundering flood.
Berlin may build a Holier Inquisition –
It will but mean an extra-late edition.
Hitler be hailed through all a wrecked Ukraine –
We shall just read, and turn to golf again.
For God, the day our guardian seas He took,
Gave us the broad breast of a Beaverbrook;
Round us, though fails the Channel – never fear! –
Still lie the stainless depths of Rothermere.

[From a verse-satire by F. L. Lucas on the non-interventionist British press barons; New Statesman and Nation, 11 May 1935, p. 669]

As well as letters to the press (some forty in all, most to The Manchester Guardian – see Political letters below) his campaign included satires, articles, books, public speaking, fund-raising for the Red Cross, petitions to Parliament, meetings with émigrés like Haile Selassie and Stefan Zweig, and help for refugees. In these activities he was inspired by the example of "that grand old man" H. W. Nevinson, "one of the most striking personalities I have ever known", "whose long life has been given to Liberty". He dedicated his 1938 book The Delights of Dictatorship to Nevinson, by then a friend.

Believing that future readers would be interested in what it had been like to live through such times, Lucas kept and published in mid-1939 a diary for 1938, Journal Under the Terror, 1938. (The "high source" he refers to in Journal was probably Harold Nicolson.) Journal is notable for its candid remarks on pro-Nazi and pro-appeasement figures in the British Establishment. Of Chamberlain at Munich he wrote (30 September):

"Even if what he did were the right thing to do, this was not the way to do it." "The surrender might have been necessary: the cant was not. Any statesman with a sense of honour would at least have stilled that hysterical cheering and said: My friends, for the present, we are out of danger. But remember that others, who trusted in us, are not. This is a day for relief, perhaps; but for sorrow also; for shame, not for revelling. But this Chamberlain comes home beaming as fatuously as some country-cousin whom a couple of card-sharpers in the train have just allowed to win sixpence, to encourage him."

The outcome he feared was an Anglo-German peace agreement – an accord between Nazis and the British Establishment: "One day a little note from Berchtesgaden will appoint Lord Londonderry to 10 Downing Street. And that will settle everything." Though he welcomed the Government's about-turn on appeasement in March 1939, he doubted the genuineness of the conversion. "The noble lords of our Fifth Column still go marching on."

The Nazis had noted Lucas's letters. In August 1939 he received a reply from Goebbels, advising him to heed public opinion. As a leading anti-fascist campaigner, he was placed by the Nazis on their Sonderfahndungsliste G.B. [:Special Search List G.B.] of Britons to be arrested and liquidated.

=== Bletchley Park ===
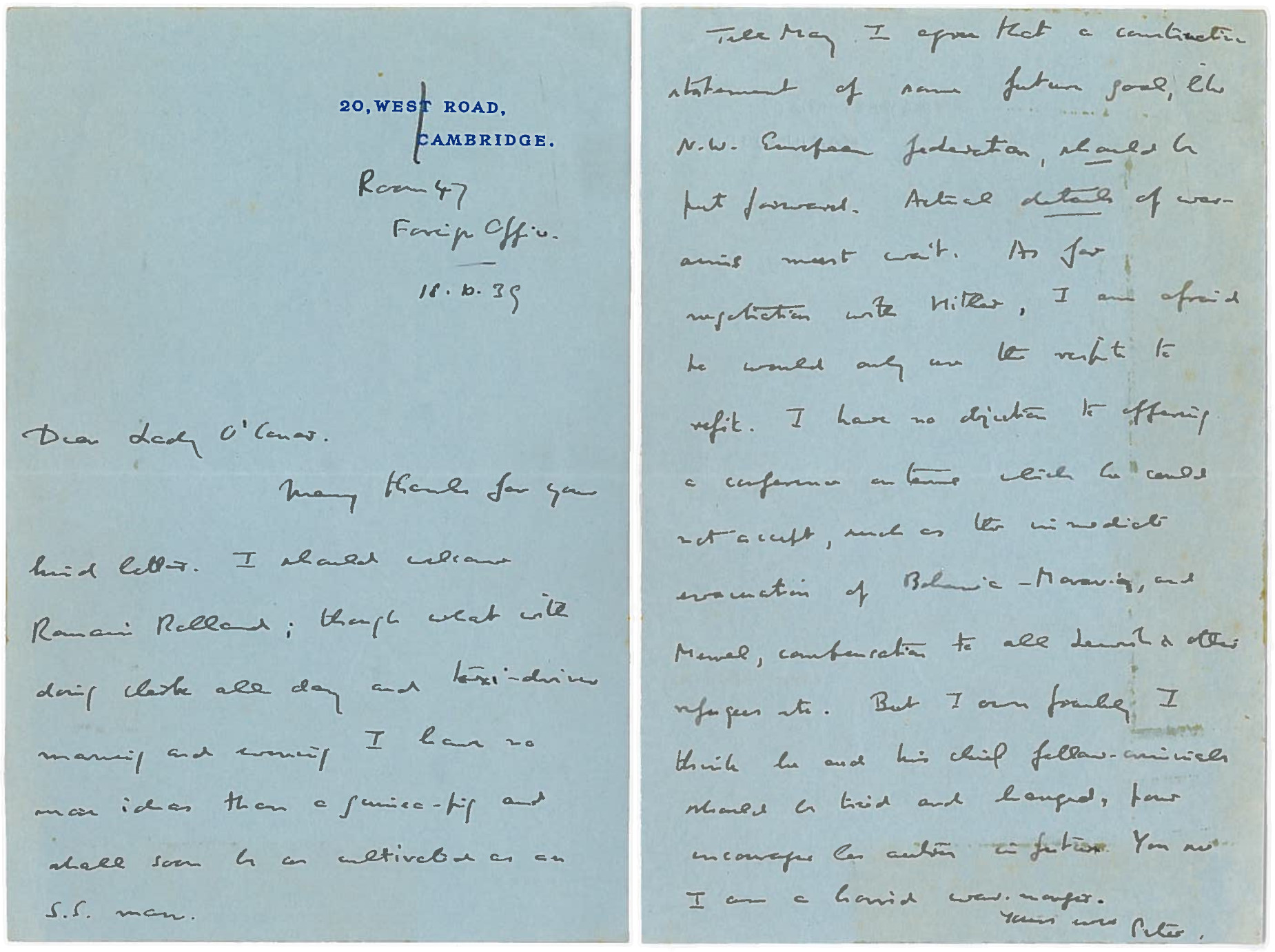
A 1939 Lucas letter from 'Room 47, Foreign Office' [:Bletchley Park], throwing a correspondent off the scent.

A brilliant linguist with infantry and Intelligence Corps experience from 1914 to 1918, proven anti-fascist credentials and a scepticism about the Soviet Union, Lucas was one of the first academics recruited by the Foreign Office – on 3 September 1939 – to Bletchley Park. He was one of the original four members of Hut 3, whose organisation he set up, and from March to July 1942, when the Hut was run by committee, acting head. He remained a central figure there, working throughout the war on the Enigma decodes as translator, intelligence-analyst and (from July 1942) head of the Research Section, 3G [:Hut 3 General Intelligence], on the busy 4 p.m. to 1 a.m. shift. His main activities in 3G were cracking Axis covernames and covernumbers in decodes, analysing German "proformas" (supplies and ammunition returns), and writing general intelligence papers.

Among the intelligence-reports he produced was a study of Hitler's intentions in the east in May 1941, which contrasted with the Foreign Office view that the Germans were just "building up pressure [on the U.S.S.R.] to extract more raw materials". "It becomes harder than ever to doubt," Lucas wrote,

"that the object of these large movements of the German Army and Air Force is Russia. From rail movements towards Moldavia in the south to ship movements towards Varanger fjord in the far north there is everywhere the same eastward trend. Either the purpose is blackmail or it is war. No doubt Hitler would prefer a bloodless surrender. But the quiet move, for instance, of a prisoner-of-war cage to Tarnow looks more like business than bluff."

Other Lucas papers ranged from practical suggestions, such as the proposal that the Salonica-Athens railway be cut in the Oeta gorges viaducts (carried out in Operation Harling), to psychological overviews later in the war, like 'Hitler as seen by Source' [:through decodes] and 'German Morale as seen by Source' (his old special subject from 1918 Intelligence Corps days).

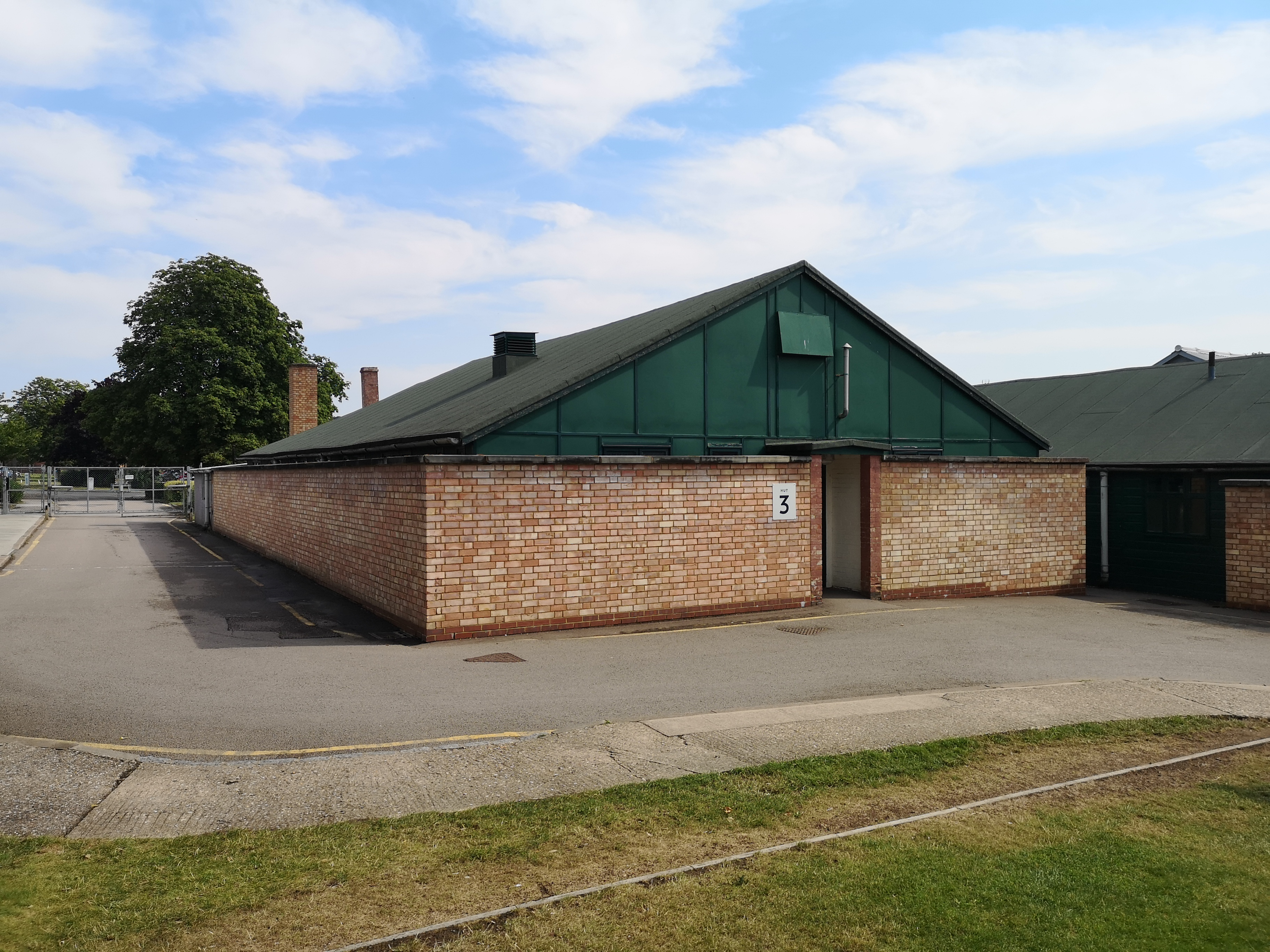
Hut 3 with a blast wall rebuilt by Bletchley Park Trust

He also wrote confidential Special Reports for the Bletchley Park Director-General, one on Second Front rumours in German signals, and another, with Peter Calvocoressi, in late 1944 on Ultra and the failure of Allied intelligence to foresee the German counter-offensive through the Ardennes in December 1944. Lucas and Calvocoressi concluded "the costly reverse might have been avoided if Ultra had been more carefully considered". For its part, Hut 3 had grown "shy of going beyond its job of amending and explaining German messages", believing that "drawing broad conclusions was for the intelligence staff at SHAEF, who had information from all sources", including aerial reconnaissance. E. J. N. Rose, head Air Adviser in Hut 3, read the paper at the time and described it in 1998 as "an extremely good report" that "showed the failure of intelligence at SHAEF and at the Air Ministry". The report is not known to have survived. It was probably the "Top Secret [intelligence] digest", a post-mortem on that failure, referred to by General Strong (1968), "both record-copies of which were destroyed". (A report by "C", the Chief of the Secret Intelligence Service, On indications of German December 1944 counter-offensive in Ardennes, derived from ULTRA material, submitted to DMI by C, issued 28 December 1944, is held in the UK National Archives as file HW 13/45; Calvocoressi, however, who knew Bennett's 1979 book and General Strong's claim, stated in 2001 that the Lucas-Calvocoressi report was not.) Lucas and Calvocoressi "expected heads to roll at Eisenhower's HQ, but they did no more than wobble".

The most "exciting" work he did at Bletchley Park, he recalled, was handling operational signals on Axis convoys to North Africa from July 1941 and deducing convoys' routes using decrypts, maps, pins and pieces of string. The high standards of accuracy and clarity that prevailed in Hut 3, his chief maintained, were "largely due to [Lucas's] being such a stickler" for them.

In out-of-hut hours Major Lucas was Officer Commanding the Bletchley Park Home Guard, a "rabble of egg-heads" that he turned, contrary to stereotype, into an efficient unit that outwitted the local regular forces in military exercises. He arranged the digging of defence positions to give code-breakers time to destroy papers should Bletchley Park come under attack. From June 1945 to the end of the War he was head of the Hut 3 History Section, compiling a 'History of Hut 3', now documents HW3/119 and HW3/120 in the National Archives. He was awarded the OBE in 1946 for his wartime work. (Note: Non-Intelligence-specific reflections on his wartime years, and on work and colleagues at Bletchley Park ("my War Office department"), are contained in The Greatest Problem (London, 1960) [pp.43, 117, 151, 270–271, 278], in Literature and Psychology (London, 1951) [p.68], in Style (London, 1955) [p.22, p.143], and in the autobiographical essay in World Authors, 1950–1970: A Companion Volume to Twentieth-Century Authors, ed. John Wakeman (New York 1975) [pp.882-884].)

=== Demographics ===
In later years Lucas took up the cause of population-control, "a problem not talked about nearly enough", discussing the dangers of world overpopulation in The Greatest Problem (1960). Having laid out the statistics to 1959 and future projections, he argued that the "reckless proliferation" of homo sapiens, as well as impoverishing the world by environmental damage and species-extinctions, would be damaging to the individual and to society:

"The finest human qualities are endangered, because the size of populations increases, and ought to be diminished; the size of states increases, and ought to be diminished; the size of cities increases, and ought to be diminished. Vast communities lead to small individuals; and the real worth of any community lies in the worth of its individuals... The individual comes to feel himself a mere drop in the ocean; and feeling impotent, he grows irresponsible... Vast democracies cannot keep the virtues of democracy."

If population-growth went unchecked, he felt, "the damage to national efficiency might drive governments to act more intelligently"; but better would be "a concentrated drive for population-planning, despite the formidable practical, scientific and psychological obstacles". "Far more, however," he added, "depends on the individual and his power to realise his own plight. Hence the need for constant and frank discussion, instead of leaving the subject, as now, in a conspiracy of uneasy silence; and the need for patient and tireless propaganda against man's reckless propagation."

Axiom

"The more populous the world and the more intricate its structure, the greater must be its fundamental insecurity. A world-structure too elaborately scientific, if once disrupted by war, revolution, natural cataclysm or epidemic, might collapse into a chaos not easily rebuilt."

― F. L. Lucas, The Greatest Problem (1960), p. 319-320

He singled out the Vatican for particular criticism. "Common sense percolates," he had written in 1934, "despite the Roman Church; which with its half-cynical sense of reality will doubtless end by swallowing the inevitable, as with Copernicus and Darwin, and evolve some doctrine of Immaculate Contraception." He later pointed out the illogicality of the doctrine declaring it lawful to juggle with the calendar but otherwise unlawful to practise contraception.

He was not optimistic about post-war immigration to the UK, believing that in the modern world overbreeding was not solved by migration, which in turn could bring new social problems. "Persons of liberal principles are shocked if one views this influx with misgiving. But the advantages are far from certain. Principles, however liberal, are no substitute for common sense."

In Literature and Psychology (1951) he had conjectured that the end of civilisation might come, not from war or famine, but from a decay of man's intelligence and self-control under the strain of a too artificial way of life. His only science-fiction story, 'Last Act' (1937), set in a not-too-distant future, had depicted the beginning of the end for "the desolator, Man", in an overpopulated, over-technological, and rapidly overheating biosphere.

== Works ==
=== Books ===
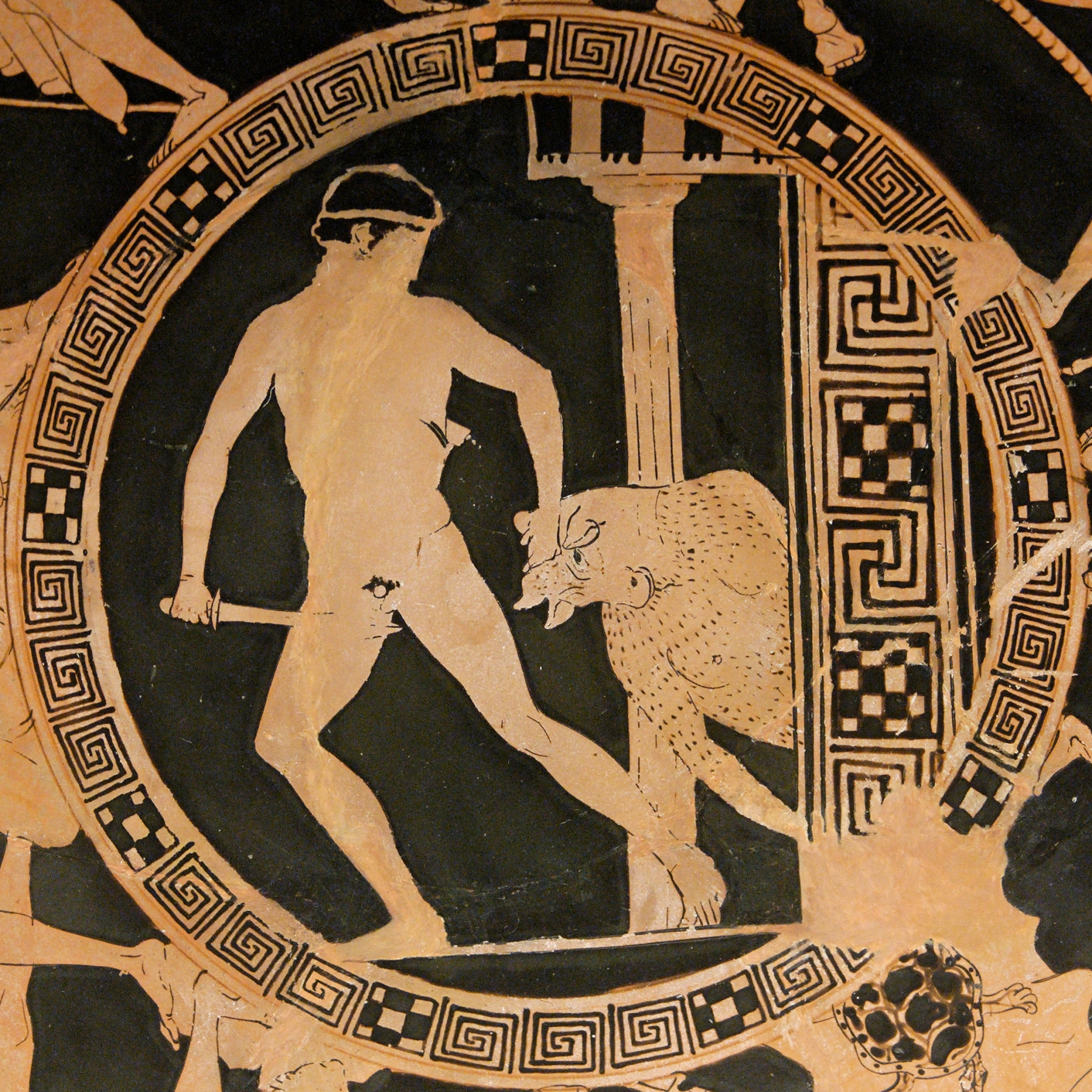
Theseus dragging Minotaur from Labyrinth, Attic vase-painting chosen by Lucas as cover emblem for four of his books published by the Cambridge University Press

- Seneca and Elizabethan Tragedy (Cambridge University Press, 1922 ; C.U.P. paperback 2009, ISBN 1-108-00358-3)
- Euripides and his Influence (Marshall Jones, Boston, 1923 ; Harrap, London, 1924; Literary Licensing LLC paperback 2012, ISBN 1-258-33712-6)
- Euripides: Medea, partly in the original and partly in translation; with introduction and notes (Oxford University Press, 1923)
- Euripides: Medea; verse translation, with introduction and notes (Oxford University Press, 1924)
- Ferenc Békássy: 'Adriatica' and other poems; selection with preface (Hogarth Press, London, 1925)
- Authors Dead and Living; reviews and essays from the New Statesman [Li-Po, Drayton, Donne, Vaughan, Cotton, Marvell, Leopardi, Melville, Whitman, Swinburne, O'Shaughnessy, Flecker, Masefield, Housman, de la Mare, Bottomley, Davies, Rosenberg, Drinkwater, Dobson, Luce, Campbell, H.D., Edna St Vincent Millay, Belloc, Blunt, Sara Teasdale, Yeats, Lawrence, Wolfe, Sylvia Townsend Warner, Graves] (Chatto & Windus, London, 1926 ; Hassell Street Press, 2021, ISBN 1013735471; essay on Housman reprinted in the Critical Heritage series, ed. Philip Gardner, 1992)
- The River Flows; novel (Hogarth Press, London, 1926)
- The Complete Works of John Webster; edition in four volumes: 1 , 2 , 3 , 4 (Chatto & Windus, London, 1927; Houghton Mifflin, N.Y., 1928; O.U.P., New York, 1937; Chatto & Windus, London, 1966 ; Gordian Press, N.Y., 1966)
- Tragedy in Relation to Aristotle's 'Poetics' (Hogarth Press, London, 1927)
- Time and Memory; poems and verse translations (Hogarth Press, London, 1929)
- Cécile; novel (Chatto & Windus, London, 1930; Henry Holt, New York, 1930 ; Chatto & Windus Centaur Library, London, 1931)
- Marionettes; poems and verse translations (Cambridge University Press, 1930; paperback 2012, ISBN 1-107-60498-2)
- Eight Victorian Poets; essays [Tennyson, Browning, Arnold, Clough, Rossetti, Swinburne, Morris, Hardy] (Cambridge University Press, 1930)
- The Art of Dying – an anthology of last words; selected with Francis Birrell; preface by Lucas (Hogarth Press, London, 1930)
- The Wild Tulip; novella (Joiner & Steele, London, 1932)
- Ariadne; poem, in four books (Cambridge University Press, 1932; paperback 2014, ISBN 9781107677524)
- Alfred, Lord Tennyson – an anthology; with introduction (Cambridge University Press, 1932; paperback 2013, ISBN 9781107682832)
- Thomas Lovell Beddoes – an anthology; with introduction (Cambridge University Press, 1932; paperback 2013, ISBN 9781107652446)
- Dante Gabriel Rossetti – an anthology; with introduction (Cambridge University Press, 1933; paperback 2013, ISBN 9781107639799)
- George Crabbe – an anthology; with introduction (Cambridge University Press, 1933)
- The Bear Dances: A Play in Three Acts; drama, with political essay: 'The Gospel According to Saint Marx' (Cassell, London, 1933)
- The Criticism of Poetry; essay [The Warton Lecture on English Poetry, 1933; Proceedings of the British Academy, Vol.19.] (Oxford University Press, London, 1933)
- Studies French and English ; essays [Hesiod, Langland, Ronsard, Montaigne , Dorothy Osborne, Crabbe, Beddoes, Flaubert, Proust] (Cassell, London, 1934; revised edition, 1950); (essay on Ronsard reprinted in The Cassell Miscellany, London, 1958); Forgotten Books edition, 2017 ISBN 978-0-259-21221-8
- From Olympus to the Styx; Greek travelogue, written with Prudence Lucas (Cassell, London, 1934)
- Marie Mauron: Mount Peacock, or Progress in Provence; translation, with introduction (Cambridge University Press, 1934; paperback, 2014 ISBN 9781107647183)
- Poems, 1935; poems and verse translations, with preface (Cambridge University Press, 1935)
- Four Plays: 'Land's End'; 'Surrender to Discretion'; 'The Lovers of Gudrun'; 'Death of a Ghost' (Cambridge University Press, 1935)
- The Awakening of Balthazar; poem for the Abyssinian Red Cross Fund (Cassell, London, 1935)
- The Decline and Fall of the Romantic Ideal; literary criticism, with Iceland travelogue and essay on Icelandic Sagas (Cambridge University Press, 1936 ; Read Books paperback 2012, ISBN 1-4067-2311-8; CUP paperback 2014, ISBN 9780521092005)
- The Golden Cockerel Greek Anthology; originals and verse translations, with introduction and notes; engravings by Lettice Sandford (Golden Cockerel Press, 1937)
- The Woman Clothed with the Sun, and Other Stories; a novella and short stories (Cassell, London, 1937; Simon and Schuster, New York, 1938)
- The Delights of Dictatorship; history and politics (Heffer, Cambridge, 1938)
- Doctor Dido; novel (Cassell, London, 1938)
- A Greek Garland; a Selection from the Palatine Anthology; originals and verse translations, with introduction and notes [enlarged version of 1937 volume] (Oxford University Press, 1939)
- Journal Under the Terror, 1938; diary (Cassell, London, 1939)
- The Vigil of Venus; the original and a verse translation, with introduction and notes; engravings by John Buckland Wright (Golden Cockerel Press, 1939)
- Messene Redeemed; a verse drama (Oxford University Press, 1940)
- Ten Victorian Poets; essays [Tennyson, Browning, Arnold, Clough, Patmore, Rossetti, Christina Rossetti, Swinburne, Morris, Hardy] (Cambridge University Press, 1940; essay on Hardy reprinted in the Macmillan Casebook series, editors Gibson & Johnson, 1979)
- Critical Thoughts in Critical Days; essay (Allen & Unwin, London, 1942)
- Tennyson, Poetry and Prose; an anthology, with introduction and notes (Oxford University Press, 1947)
- The Homeric Hymn to Aphrodite; the original and a verse translation, with introduction and notes; engravings by Mark Severin (Golden Cockerel Press, 1948)
- Aphrodite – two verse translations: the Homeric Hymn to Aphrodite and the Pervigilium Veneris; with the originals; brings together 1939 and 1948 volumes (Cambridge University Press, 1948)
- Gilgamesh, King of Erech; poem in free verse, re-telling the Sumerian epic; engravings by Dorothea Braby (Golden Cockerel Press, 1948)
- Homer: The Odyssey; verse translation in selection, with introduction and notes; engravings by John Buckland Wright (Folio Society, 1948)
- Musaeus: Hero and Leander; verse translation, with introduction; engravings by John Buckland Wright (Golden Cockerel Press, 1949)
- Homer: The Iliad; verse translation in selection, with introduction and notes; engravings by John Buckland Wright (Folio Society, 1950)
- Literature and Psychology; literary criticism based on the case-notes of Wilhelm Stekel [Shakespeare, The Romantics, Romanticism in Decay] (Cassell, London, 1951; revised edition, University of Michigan Press, 1957 )
- Greek Poetry for Everyman; verse translations, with introductions and notes (Dent, London, 1951)
- From Many Times and Lands; poems of legend and history (Bodley Head, London, 1953)
- Greek Drama for Everyman; full verse translations [Prometheus Bound, Agamemnon, Oedipus the King, Antigone, Hippolytus, Bacchae, Clouds] and selections, with introductions and notes (Dent, London, 1954)
- Style (Cassell, London, 1955; 2nd ed., with footnote translations: Collier Books, 1962, Pan Books, 1964; 3rd ed. Harriman House Publishing, 2012 ISBN 978-0-85719-187-8); 4th ed. Harriman House Publishing, 2020, with foreword by Joseph Epstein
- Tragedy: Serious Drama in Relation to Aristotle's 'Poetics'; revised and enlarged edition of 1927 volume (Hogarth Press, London, 1957; with footnote translations: Collier Books, 1962)
- Tennyson ; essay [British Council 'Writers and their Works' series] (Longman, London, 1957)
- Webster: The White Devil; revised edition (Chatto & Windus, London, 1958)
- Webster: The Duchess of Malfi; revised edition (Chatto & Windus, London, 1958)
- The Search for Good Sense: Four Eighteenth-Century Characters: Johnson, Chesterfield, Boswell, Goldsmith (Cassell, London, 1958; 2nd edition, with corrections, Cassell, Nov. 1959; Bloomsbury Publishing, 2015 )
- The Art of Living: Four Eighteenth-Century Minds: Hume, Horace Walpole, Burke, Benjamin Franklin (Cassell, London, 1959)

'Germany and Europe'

... My dream is of a British statesman who could say to his countrymen: "You are sick of war, weary of entanglements. There are some who would have you renounce both. I offer you instead a heavier load of foreign responsibilities, a risk of new war. Because that is the only road to lasting peace. Since the War, British policy has been shuffling, timid, ignoble. Be bold at last, and give a lead to Europe, by offering to form with France and whatever other European states will join, a League within the League, of nations pledged to submit all disputes to the League, but pledged also to fight without hesitation in defence of any member of the group who is attacked. If Germany will join, so much the better; though Germany as she is never will. If America, better still; for the present America is a broken reed. All the more honor for us to accept a responsibility if she refuses.

"The way will not be easy. We shall often regret the day we pledged ourselves to bear taxation in peace and face death in war for interests and frontiers not our own. But no interest is more really our own than the reign of law between nations."

That is little likely to happen. Only an Abraham Lincoln takes risks of that sort with a nation. But this is not because the ordinary politician is wiser; it is because the ordinary politician does not realize the latent force of idealism, all the stronger with the decay of the religions which gave it other outlets, ready in the world of to-day for any leader with the courage to use it; and so easily abused accordingly by the rulers of Moscow and Berlin.

[From a letter by Lucas to The Week-end Review, 21 October 1933]

- The Greatest Problem, and Other Essays; an essay on world overpopulation, literary essays [Tolstoy, Housman, 'Translation'], and autobiographical pieces (Cassell, London, 1960)
- The Drama of Ibsen and Strindberg; literary criticism (Cassell, London, 1962)
- August Strindberg: Inferno; translation by Mary Sandbach, introduction by Lucas (Hutchinson, London, 1962)
- The Drama of Chekhov, Synge, Yeats and Pirandello; literary criticism (Cassell, London, 1963)
- Greek Poetry; verse translations; revised and renamed edition of 1951 volume, without the passages from Homer (Everyman's Library, Dent, London, 1966)
- Greek Drama for the Common Reader; verse translations; revised and renamed edition of 1954 volume (Chatto & Windus, London, 1967)
- Greek Tragedy and Comedy; verse translations; renamed paperback edition of 1967 volume (Viking Press, New York, 1968)
- The English Agent: A Tale of The Peninsular War; novel (Cassell, London, 1969)

=== Other writings ===
- 'The Boar'; short story set in the aftermath of the Second Servile War (Athenaeum, 10 September 1920)
- 'The Fortune of Carthage'; short story on the Battle of the Metaurus (Athenaeum, 28 January 1921)
- 'The Brown Bag'; short story (Cambridge Review, 6 May 1921)
- 'The Battlefield of Pharsalos'; report on a field study (Annual of the British School at Athens, No. XXIV, 1919–21)
- 'The Reverse of Aristotle'; a discussion of Peripeteia (Classical Review, August–September 1923)
- 'The Waste Land'; review (New Statesman, 3 November 1923 ; reprinted in the Macmillan Casebook series and the Critical Heritage series)
- 'The Duchess of Malfi'; essay (New Statesman, 1 March 1924)
- 'Playing the Devil'; theatre-review of The White Devil (New Statesman, 17 October 1925)
- 'English Literature'; essay on English at Cambridge (University Studies, Cambridge 1933; editor Harold Wright; London, 1933)
- 'Poetry Examined by Professor Housman'; review of Housman's Name and Nature of Poetry (Cambridge Review, 8 June 1933)
- 'Iceland: 1. In theory'; essay on the sagas (The Cornhill Magazine, July 1935, vol.152, no.907, p.11)
- 'Iceland: 2. In practice'; travelogue (The Cornhill Magazine, August 1935, vol.152, no.908, p.9]
- 'Mithridates – The Poetry of A.E. Housman'; essay (Cambridge Review, 15 May 1936; reprinted in A. E. Housman: The Critical Heritage, ed. Philip Gardner, 1992; reprinted 2024 )
- 'Julian Bell'; a memoir (Cambridge Review, 15 October 1937; reprinted in The Cambridge Mind, editors Homberger, Janeway & Shama, 1970)
- 'Proud Motherhood (Madrid A.D. 1937)'; poem (Poems for Spain, 1939; editors Spender & Lehmann; reprinted in The Penguin Book of Spanish Civil War Verse)
- 'William Wordsworth'; essay (Fifteen Poets, an anthology, Oxford University Press, 1941)
- 'A History of Hut 3'; memoir (National Archives documents, ref. HW3/119 and HW3/120)
- 'Poet Laureate of Henry VIII'; essay on John Skelton (The Listener, 8 May 1947, p. 270)
- 'Poetry'; 'Epic'; 'Ode'; 'Elegy'; 'Lyric'; 'Pastoral'; articles (Chambers's Encyclopaedia, 1950–66)
- 'On the Fascination of Style'; essay (Holiday, March 1960; reprinted in The Odyssey Reader: Ideas and Style, ed. Birk and Birk, N.Y. 1968, and in Readings for Writers, ed. Jo Ray McCuen and Anthony C. Winkler, N.Y., 2009 ISBN 1-4282-3128-5); reissued as 'How to Write Powerful Prose', Petersfield, 2012 )
- 'Johnson's Bête Grise'; essay on Johnson's criticism of Gray's poetry (The New Rambler: Journal of the Johnson Society of London, June 1960)
- 'The Lonely Beauty of Iceland'; travelogue (Holiday, September 1963)
- 'Across Eternal Egypt'; travelogue (Holiday, June 1964)
- 'The Art of Proverbs'; essay (Holiday, September 1965; reprinted in Mieder and Sobieski, Gold Nuggets or Fool's Gold? Magazine and Newspaper Articles on the (Ir)relevance of Proverbial Phrases, Burlington, 2006)
- 'Long Lives the Emperor'; essay on The Hundred Days (The Historical Journal, Vol.8, No.1, Cambridge, 1965 )

=== Political letters ===
'The limits of self-determination for racial minorities'

To the Editor of the Manchester Guardian

Sir,

Many honest folk feel it hard to deny the Sudetens self-determination, if they want to belong to the Reich. But then, can we deny it to the Czech areas among the Sudetens? Then what about Sudeten pockets in the Czech areas? Self-determination must stop somewhere. In politics, as in physics, you come to a point where you cannot go on splitting things. You cannot have self-determination by villages. You may split Czechoslovakia now. In a few years it will be one again. Only it will be German. That is all.

What would our own answer be, supposing we were expected on racial grounds to hand over to Berlin our coastal counties from Essex to Northumberland? We should reply that any nation must defend itself against a step which would make it impossible to defend itself.

You cannot by any juggling with frontiers abolish racial minorities in Europe. And you cannot totally ignore geography. It follows that where you cannot move mountains you must move men. If the Sudetens are irrevocably set on being in the Reich let them go to the Reich instead of expecting the Reich to come to them. The Germans are the later comers in Bohemia. There are precedents for such an exodus. Good Aryans may disdain to copy Moses, but within these fifteen years just such an exchange of minorities has cured, as nothing else could have cured, the secular hate of Greek and Turk. If a small, poor and barren state like Greece could absorb between one and two million refugees it is absurd to pretend that a great country like Germany, which Hitler has set flowing with milk and honey, could not do as much and more. And if the Czechs can give a home to the persecuted refugees of the Axis, so much the better.

This seems to me justice. The alternative is to admit the Trojan Horse into Prague. That may be the sort of fool's wisdom called "expediency"; it is the line of least resistance; but at least let us not cant about its honesty.

Undoubtedly Hitler will object. He has other aims. It is not oppression he minds; the loudest yelps about persecution come from the persecutor of the Jews. Czechoslovakia lies on the flank of the German drive to the Black Sea. Therefore, Hitler will not hear reason.

A question that vitally affects all Europe should be discussed by Europe. If Hitler foams at the mere mention of the League, let it be a European conference. Only let it give full weight to those smaller Powers which have often a more disinterested sense of decency than their great neighbours. If Hitler refuses he puts himself at once in the wrong. The verdict of such a conference may not convince him; but if he cannot reason, he can count.

[From a letter by Lucas to the Manchester Guardian, 15 September 1938]

- 'New Forms of Harmony in Germany' (The Listener [BBC], 16 August 1933)
- 'Germany, Europe and Peace' (Week-end Review, 16 September 1933)
- 'Germany and Europe' (Week-end Review, 21 October 1933)
- 'Abyssinia: Our Duty' (The Daily Telegraph, 25 July 1935)
- 'Italy and Abyssinia' (Daily Telegraph, 31 July 1935)
- 'Italy's Claims' (Daily Telegraph, 7 August 1935)
- 'An Italian Teacher's Political Views' (Manchester Guardian, 9 August 1935)
- 'Impartiality at Cambridge' (Manchester Guardian, 14 August 1935)
- 'Home-truths from Italy' (New Statesman and Nation, 24 August 1935)
- 'Reply to an Italian's defence' (Morning Post, 12 October 1935)
- 'Mussolini's War' (Manchester Guardian, 14 October 1935)
- 'Mr. Bernard Shaw's Letter' (The Times, 24 October 1935)
- 'The Italians in Tripoli' (Manchester Guardian, 11 January 1936)
- 'Congratulations to the University of Heidelberg' (Cambridge Review, 14 February 1936)
- 'The League's Abyssinian Front' (Manchester Guardian, 12 March 1936)
- 'Alliance with Germany' (Daily Telegraph, written 27 April 1936)
- 'Fascism and Communism' (Daily Telegraph, 3 August 1936)
- 'British Policy in World Crises' (Manchester Guardian, 22 September 1936)
- 'Democracy and Progress' (Time and Tide, 10 October 1936)
- 'Blackshirt Marches and Meetings' (Manchester Guardian, 23 October 1936)
- ' "Non-Intervention in Spain" ' (Manchester Guardian, 16 February 1937)
- 'Barbarities of Modern War' (Manchester Guardian, 14 May 1937)
- 'The National Government's Foreign Policy' (Manchester Guardian, 6 September 1937)
- 'Pacifism and Panic-Mongering' (Manchester Guardian, 1 December 1937)
- 'Pacifism and Air-Raid Precautions' (Manchester Guardian, 7 December 1937)
- 'The Absolute Pacifist Position' (Manchester Guardian, 15 December 1937)
- 'Mr. Chamberlain's "Realistic" Policy' (Manchester Guardian, 10 March 1938)
- 'To the Editor of The Times ' (Journal Under the Terror, 17 March 1938)
- 'An Open Letter to Lord Halifax' (Journal Under the Terror, 12 May 1938)
- 'Labour and the Popular Front' (New Statesman and Nation, 14 May 1938)
- 'Air Defence' (Daily Telegraph, 16 May 1938)
- 'Britain and Political Refugees' (Manchester Guardian, 20 May 1938)
- 'Refugee Jews and England' (Manchester Guardian, 26 August 1938)
- 'The European Crisis' (Manchester Guardian, 15 September 1938)
- 'The Funeral of British Honour' (Manchester Guardian, 4 October 1938)
- 'The Refugees in Czechoslovakia' (Manchester Guardian, 3 November 1938)
- 'The Two Voices' (Manchester Guardian, 7 November 1938)
- 'After Barcelona' (Manchester Guardian, 7 February 1939)
- 'Germany and World Empire' (Manchester Guardian, 10 February 1939)
- 'Hitler as "The Friend of Peace" ' (Manchester Guardian, 24 February 1939)
- 'Friendship with Germany' (Manchester Guardian, 8 March 1939)
- 'German Opinion about England' (Manchester Guardian, 15 August 1939)

== Adaptations ==
- Gerald Finzi set to music Lucas's poem 'June on Castle Hill' (1935) in his collection To a Poet, op.13a no.5
- Margaret Wood's play A Kind of Justice (1966) is based on Lucas's poem 'Spain 1809' (1953)
- John Joubert set to music Lucas's poem 'Beleaguered Cities' (1929) in his collection Landscapes (1992), op.129
- Nicola Baldwin's The Nervous State is a dramatic adaptation of Lucas's Journal Under the Terror, 1938 (1939)
