= The River Flows =

Semi-autobiographical novel by Briton, F. L. Lucas, from 1926

- First edition wrapper
- Author: F. L. Lucas
- Genre: Novel
- Publisher: Hogarth Press
- English publication date: October 1926

The River Flows is a semi-autobiographical first novel, published in 1926, by the British writer F. L. Lucas. The title is taken from a poem by T'ao Ch'ien, translated by Arthur Waley, three lines from which form the novel's epigraph.

== Plot summary ==
Written in the form of a journal with inserted letters, the story begins in early 1913, with the narrator, David Halliday (a Cambridge Classics graduate, aged 22, working on a fellowship thesis on Theocritus) holidaying happily alone in the Lake District. On his way back to Cambridge he visits in Yorkshire student-friend Philip Winton, for whom "in the odd dispassionately passionate Cambridge way", as one reviewer put it, he feels a strong affection. A request by Philip's mother that he help find Philip a wife stirs in David a feeling of possessiveness. A former college friend, Hugh Fawcett, now in the Foreign Office, warns David that Philip will drain him of emotional vitality. At dinner in Cambridge with his Supervisor, Mr Dodgson, and his wife, David meets the youngest sister of Mrs D., Margaret Osborne, 25, a young woman who has just "perpetrated" a first novel, The Crystal Cabinet ("oh, quite shocking, my dear"). David reads the novel and praises it to his confidant-uncle, who notices his admiration for Margaret:

"If you ever fall in love, David, with a real person, don't be too prudent, too easily daunted into silence by bars of circumstance, too ready to suffer dumbly, too sure it's all no use. A real person can be trusted with the truth."

Presenting Philip with the volume, David invites Margaret to meet his best friend; then regrets having no opportunity to talk to Margaret alone. He has fallen in love with her. He agonises for days over whether he should act upon it, given his uncertain circumstances. Finally, resolving to be bold, he invites her to tea alone. She does not show up. That evening, Philip tells David that he and Margaret have become engaged. A letter of apology from Margaret arrives, excusing her absence and expressing the hope that she will not come between the two friends. Full of self-contempt, David takes comfort in the fact that Margaret and Philip haven't noticed his passion. Already struggling with his thesis, he abandons it and takes reviewing work with a 'highbrow' weekly in London. He visits Philip and Margaret in Yorkshire, where he notes signs of incompatibility and basks in Margaret's company. Philip's mother is all admiration for his skills as matchmaker. The following spring (1914) David is invited to join the couple as organiser, interpreter and friend, on a tour of Greece. He knows he shouldn't go, but convinces himself he will be strong enough not to come between them. In Greece, however, with David in his element, Philip's jealousy awakens; it irritates Margaret. In a dramatic crisis near Olympia, Margaret and Philip quarrel and by bad luck are separated during a long mountain hike, Margaret being benighted with David. David confesses all. Next day, convinced that he has been betrayed (he hasn't), Philip strikes his friend and returns alone to Athens, where he attempts suicide. The attempt leaves him suffering from memory-loss, depression and a nervous possessiveness. Margaret and David, now lovers, nurse him and bring him back to England. The pair steal night meetings on the moors (the novel "contains a scene of love in the heather above Swaledale that was considered unusually frank for 1926", recalled a colleague of Lucas's at King's). War breaks out in Europe; David, after much inward debate and discussion with friends, applies for a commission in the army. On leave from training and later from the Front, he visits Margaret and Philip in Yorkshire, the two lovers resuming the secret affair. Growing careless, one dawn they are discovered by Philip, whose memory of events at Olympia horribly returns. The lovers part for the last time. David returns to the Trenches. His journal ends abruptly in September 1915, in mid-sentence.

== Background ==
Lucas did not write a World War I memoir as such, but described some of his wartime experiences in The River Flows, in Journal Under the Terror, 1938 (1939) and in autobiographical essays in The Greatest Problem, and other essays (1960). Some of the events the novel is loosely based on occurred in 1919–1921 (see F. L. Lucas, Biographical), but Lucas moved them to a pre-War setting in order to conclude with the War pages (1914–15). Margaret Osborne is based on Lucas's first wife, the novelist E. B. C. Jones, Philip Winton on Sebastian Sprott (to whom the book was dedicated), Hugh Fawcett ("the best brain in the Foreign Office") on John Maynard Keynes, Mr Dodgson on Donald Robertson of the Trinity Classics department. Jones had recently written a novel, The Wedgwood Medallion (1923, the model for The Crystal Cabinet), about a similar love-triangle, while her Inigo Sandys (1924) had been, in part, about passionate male friendships at Cambridge University. Lucas had visited Greece in 1920 (with Sebastian Sprott) and in 1921 (alone), and used recollections from these visits in The River Flows.

== Themes ==
The novel traces the way a scrupulous, sensitive young intellectual, diffident but proud, highly intelligent but inexperienced, is drawn by emotion into betraying the values he believes in (loyalty, unselfishness, the importance of not causing pain), while forging new ones he only half believes in ('love' and living to the full). The New Statesman called the novel "a candid, delicate, though not a profound study of jealousy". "Nothing is quite so horrible as jealousy," observes Margaret Osborne. "It attacks the best as much as the meanest; and it spoils and debases them under your eyes."

The novel is also notable for its admission – not so common in War memoirs of the 1920s – of the "strange repellent fascination" of war. "Squalor, foulness, utter boredom – yet at instants this strange repellent fascination, that seized me the moment I set eyes on Fricourt and Mametz and the great heave of the gaunt uplands of the Somme. And I abandon myself to it when it comes, as to some turbid, heady wine. There is poison in the dregs, and the cold dread of death. Yet it intoxicates. This insignificant 'I' loses itself for a moment in a grapple of empires, the agony of a world."

== Reception ==
While praising the power and beauty of the scenes in Greece, several reviewers found the form of a confessional-diary with inserted love-letters improbable, and the book as a whole "young". Desmond MacCarthy in the New Statesman, however, reminded them that that was the whole point, and indeed the narrator, looking at his early diary entries with hindsight, admits as much. L. P. Hartley in the Saturday Review found the characters too rational and analytical: "they ask for and need no interpretation from us" and have within them "no force of unexplored, unreasoning life"; while Edwin Muir in The Nation and Athenaeum felt that though the narrator's thoughts were set down with passion, "the desires which colour them are never sufficiently realised". The Times Literary Supplement believed that Lucas had developed "to an unnecessary extent the personal views of the narrator". Nevertheless, it noted, "The book sheds a not uninteresting light on the Cambridge scene".

Keynes, model for Hugh in the novel, wrote Lucas a brief note: "Dear Peter, I finished your book last night. I liked it very much. But perhaps chiefly because it was so very Peterish. Yours affectionately, JMK".

Admirers of the novel included T. E. Lawrence, who found that "Parts of the book come back to my memory without warning at odd times as I lie about brooding. The Greece part, especially. You get a tense effect out of quite simple words," he wrote to Lucas. "Somehow actual sentences have stuck to me". Lucas dedicated his next novel, Cécile (1930), to Lawrence.

== Publishing history ==
T. S. Eliot, as literary editor of Faber and Gwyer, hearing that Lucas had written a novel, wrote to him offering to look at it with a view to publication. The sequel to this offer is not known. The novel was published by the Hogarth Press, London, in October 1926 – Lucas was a friend of the Woolfs – and reprinted later in the same month, and by the Macmillan Company, New York, 1926 (reprinted by Macaulay Co., New York, 1926).
