= Land's End (play) =

- Written by: F. L. Lucas
- Genre: Stage thriller

Premiere
- Date premiered: 4 May 1935
- Place premiered: People's Theatre, Newcastle upon Tyne

Land's End is a stage thriller in three acts set in Cornwall in the mid-1930s, by British playwright F. L. Lucas. First produced in Newcastle upon Tyne in 1935, it was premiered in London in 1938.

== Characters (and actors in first London production) ==
- Mrs Newsome — Deirdre Doyle
- Valentine Galbraith — Mary MacOwan
- Vernon, her brother — George Astley
- Judith, her mother — Cathleen Nesbitt
- Hugh Gifford — Alan Napier
- Hector Galbraith — Cecil Trouncer
- a fisherman

== Plot summary ==
Land's End, Cornwall. A remote old cliff-top house, rocked by equinoctial gales. It belongs to explorer and hunter, Hector Galbraith, who is away in Africa. His charwoman, the macabre Mrs Newsome, warns her favourite, Hector's daughter Valentine, 20, a student home from Oxford, that her mother Judith (who has been out shooting) is having an affair with her visitor, the writer Hugh Gifford. Valentine, a hard virginal individualist, devoted to her father and hostile to Gifford, is indignant. Her brother Vernon, 19, a student home from Cambridge, is indifferent to bourgeois morality; he is a Communist, dislikes his father, and finds Hugh charming. Judith has grown estranged from her husband since he pressured their elder son, Ivor, into an Amazon expedition, in which Ivor died. Relations between mother and daughter are also strained. Now Mrs Newsome confides in Valentine: she has written to the absent master, and the latter has just returned secretly to England to surprise the adulterous pair. He is on his way to Cornwall. She persuades Valentine not to tell the others. (End of Act One.)

That evening, while Valentine and Vernon are in Penzance at a dance and the two lovers are alone in the gale-buffeted house (the scene never changes from this cluttered claustrophobic drawing-room), Galbraith walks in. After amusing himself by toying with the trapped lovers, he takes control of his house, downing brandy, throwing open the windows, brandishing a revolver, telling Judith she is starting for Africa with him (a plane is standing by at Lympne aerodrome), and giving Gifford five minutes to get out. Judith and Hugh refuse to separate. Galbraith locks Judith out of the room, tosses a second revolver at Hugh, and reminds him of the rules of duelling. If Hugh is killed, he is told, his petrol-drenched motor will be rolled off the cliff road with his body inside. Galbraith counts to three. Hugh, a veteran of the Western Front, fires well wide, in the honourable Turgenev tradition. Galbraith levels his revolver for the kill. A shotgun barrel is seen at the window. Judith blasts Galbraith. (Note: A change introduced, with the playwright's approval, in the 1938 West-End production. In the text, Judith bursts in though another door and shoots Hector.) The shaken lovers hurriedly discuss their options, and decide that, as no one is likely to have seen Hector arrive, they should dispose of him as he had planned to dispose of Hugh. They drag his body out. (End of Act Two.)

An hour and a half later the pair return from the deed, to clean up bloodstains. Just in time: Valentine and Vernon come back early from the dance, full of news: a car has gone over the cliff and is still burning in the cove! Vernon tells how he clambered down and managed to poke some burnt luggage out of the wreck. The luggage is examined: it contains an African death-mask. The distraught Valentine now realises who the victim of the "accident" was, and confesses she knew her father was coming home. Judith and Hugh feign shock. By ill luck, Valentine sees in the grate a tell-tale Russian cigarette stub, discarded by Hector before the duel – and recognises its significance. She confronts her mother. Judith, finding evasion impossible, confesses to killing her husband in defence of Hugh. Valentine, near-hysterical, decides she must call the police. Judith and Hugh try to dissuade her, as does Vernon. All three argue that concealment is possible, but that confession will be catastrophic. Valentine is anguished and torn. At that moment Mrs Newsome and a grizzled fisherman arrive, to ask if everyone is all right (the latter had seen the fire and gone straight to the Galbraiths' housekeeper). Valentine, sickened by Mrs Newsome's meddling, sends her packing, and picks up the telephone to call the police. To the end, we do not know what she will tell them.

== Productions and publication ==
Land's End was first staged by the People's Theatre, Newcastle upon Tyne, from 4 – 11 May 1935, with Cecil McGivern as Hector Galbraith. The text was published by the University Press, Cambridge, and by the Macmillan Company, New York, in Lucas's Four Plays, in October 1935. (Christabel Marshall, who had not seen the plays performed, declared them "very good reading".) Anmer Hall and Leon M. Lion directed an amended text in a West End production at the Westminster Theatre, 23 February to March 1938 (29 performances), with Cathleen Nesbitt, Cecil Trouncer and Alan Napier among the cast, and with decor by Peter Goffin. An account of rehearsals is contained in Lucas's Journal Under the Terror, 1938 (1939). On the first night at the Westminster, "the author was much called for at the close, but failed to appear". Alan Napier in his autobiography recalled one stage mishap. The pool of blood was managed by a piece of wet red cloth on the floor. In one performance, when Cathleen Nesbitt wrung her hands and asked "What are we to do about the blood?", her long skirt caught the edge of the cloth and as she walked on "rolled it up into a neat little sausage" – to the delight of the balcony and the puzzlement of the groundlings, who couldn't see what had happened. One of Paul Scofield's earliest roles was in the Birmingham Rep's revival of the play in 1945 (13 March – 14 April), with Gwen Nelson and Scott Sunderland among the cast.

== Reception ==
Land's End, the most successful of Lucas's six plays, received mixed reviews. The Stage declared it "as full of drama as an egg is full of meat", after, however, a first act "the reverse of exhilarating". "It is the first act that drags, and needs tightening up", agreed the London Mercury. Una Ellis-Fermor was more positive. "At its best," she wrote, "Mr Lucas's dialogue convinces us that it is the talk of people of high intelligence when all their faculties are working at top pressure: wise, incisive, and sometimes memorable." But she had reservations about Lucas's method (a reversal of Ibsen's) of airing family ghosts at the start rather than end.

The reviewers of the London production found Cecil Trouncer's Hector Galbraith "truly terrifying", Cathleen Nesbitt's Mrs Galbraith "magnificent", and Alan Napier's Hugh Gifford "that rare person on the stage, a writer of quick intelligence". George Astley's Vernon was memorable, "fluttering through the story as a Communistic young flower of University life". A. V. Cookman, theatre-critic of the London Mercury, thought it "a bad play" because melodramatic, but nevertheless "full of interesting talk and subtle psychological cross-lights". Elizabeth Bowen in the New Statesman agreed: "Mr Lucas has attempted to rush the barrier that divides the discursive from the melodramatic play", to combine "ideas not his own but dramatically plausible, and ideas his own but not dramatic". Still, "There are moments of fine theatre – for instance, Mrs Galbraith's languorous, intimate greeting, as she lies on the sofa with her back to the door, to someone she takes to be her lover back from the post, who is in fact her husband back, for blood, from Africa... The quickness and tension of the third act, when everyone's future hangs on the girl Valentine, an Electra with a green conscience, lasts to the final curtain."

== Background ==
Lucas's first play, The Bear Dances (1932), also directed by Leon M. Lion, had been criticised for its discursiveness and lack of action. The melodramatic Land's End was the playwright's reply, as was his Cowardesque romantic comedy, Surrender to Discretion, first produced by the People's Theatre, Newcastle upon Tyne, from 18 – 25 November 1933. Another in-joke in Land's End is the black-hatted, Montaigne-reading Hugh Gifford, a self-portrait:

VERNON: Hugh? Oh, he's charming. Complete fossil, of course, intellectually and politically – about as up to date as Shaw. But who expects a man to have ideas at forty-five? Ruined by a public-school classical education – but charming – like some ironical French essayist, from the days before essays went hopelessly out of date. Yet fought in the War – God only knows why – and isn't ashamed of it, even now. But – apart from that excursion into militarism – you know the sort of thing: comfortable scepticism, psychological armchair – lie back, light a cigarette and let this tiresome world rip, while you manicure your polished little ego. Still, he has polished his. He's rather charming. I like him. (Hugh Gifford enters, a tall, slim figure in blue tweed coat and grey trousers, with greying hair and hawk-like face.)

The Cambridge University Press, however, advertised Land's End as a tragedy (Valentine's).
