= Style (book) =

- Cover of first UK and US edition
- Author: F. L. Lucas
- Genre: Style guide, literary criticism
- Published: September 1955
- Publisher: Cassell & Company, London Macmillan Company, New York
- ISBN: 978-0-85719-187-8

F. L. Lucas's Style (1955) is a book about the writing and appreciation of "good prose", expanded for the general reader from lectures given to English literature students at Cambridge University. Setting out to answer the questions, "Why is so much writing wordy, confused, graceless, dull?" and "What are the qualities that endow language, spoken or written, with persuasiveness or power?", it offers "a few principles" and "a number of examples of the effective use of language", and adds "a few warnings". Written as a series of eleven essays, with much quotation and anecdote (and without bullet-points or note-form), which themselves illustrate the virtues commended, the work is unified by what Lucas calls "one vital thread, on which the random principles of good writing may be strung, and grasped as a whole". That "vital thread" is "courtesy to readers". It is upon this emphasis on good manners, urbanity, good humour, grace, control, that the book's aspiration to usefulness rests.

== Contents ==
Lucas begins with a definition of style in prose, and a discussion of its importance. He questions the extent to which style can be taught, given that it is a reflection of personality ("The problems of style are really problems of personality"), but concludes that "Writers should write from the best side of their characters, and at their best moments." He goes on to outline the elements of a lucid, varied, pointed prose style; to warn of perils (the book is an anthology of weeds as well as flowers); and to explore different methods of planning, composition and revision. Passages quoted for analysis are in a range of styles, taken from letters, essays, criticism, biography, history, novels and plays. Among writers praised are Voltaire, Montesquieu, Gibbon, the later Johnson, Macaulay, Sainte-Beuve, Anatole France, Lytton Strachey and Desmond MacCarthy.

There is a chapter on the rhythms of prose and on euphony. Of figures of speech, Lucas deals with simile and metaphor; of rhetorical tropes, he discusses irony, and syntactical devices such as inversion and antithesis. For points of correct English usage he refers readers to Fowler's Modern English Usage. Giving, however, a few examples of regrettable change and ignorance, he stresses the importance of "preserving the purity of the English tongue". Languages evolve, but can also degenerate.

"I can think of no constantly perfect stylist who has not laboured like an emmet."

"One cannot ask oneself too often, both in writing and in re-reading what one has written, 'Do I really mean that? Have I said it for effect, though I know it is exaggerated? Or from cowardice, because otherwise I should be ill thought of?' "

"A writer should view his mental offspring as relentlessly as a Spartan father. If he does not 'expose' his unsound offspring himself, others will, in a different sense."

― F. L. Lucas, Style (1955)

Preface
Chapter 1: The Value of Style
Chapter 2: The foundation of Style - Character
Chapter 3: Courtesy to Readers - (1) Clarity
Chapter 4: Courtesy to Readers - (2) Brevity and Variety
Chapter 5: Courtesy to Readers - (3) Urbanity and Simplicity
Chapter 6: Good Humour and Gaiety
Chapter 7: Good Sense and Sincerity
Chapter 8: Good Health and Vitality
Chapter 9: Simile and Metaphor
Chapter 10: The Harmony of Prose
Chapter 11: Methods of writing

== Background ==
Style was based on one of Lucas's first courses of lectures at Cambridge (1946 to 1953) after his return from Bletchley Park. The decision to lecture on 'Good prose, and the writing of it' (the course was later renamed 'Style') reflected a wish to improve the quality of student essays, adversely affected, Lucas felt, by the New Criticism. The decision to expand the lectures into book form for the general reader was prompted partly by his recent experience as an Intelligence report-writer in Hut 3, and partly by his belief that "on the quality of a nation's language depends to some extent the quality of its life and thought; and on the quality of its life and thought the quality of its language".

== Publishing history ==
First published in 1955 by Cassell & Company of London and by the Macmillan Company, New York, Style went through seven impressions in the UK between 1955 and 1964. In the second edition, published by Collier Books of New York in 1962 and by Pan Books of London in 1964, Lucas made minor changes and added – in response to some readers' protests – footnote translations (his own) of the book's foreign-language quotations. Cassell reprinted the first edition in 1974, adding a Foreword by Sir Bruce Fraser; this reissue Cassell mistakenly called the "second edition". After being out-of-print for four decades, the real second edition, with Lucas's translations, checked against the first edition, was reprinted in 2012 by Harriman House Publishing, of Petersfield, who added their own sub-title, 'The Art of Writing Well'. "Though one cannot teach people to write well," Lucas had observed, "one can sometimes teach them to write rather better." Harriman House brought out a fourth edition in 2020, correcting minor errors in the third and adding a Foreword by Joseph Epstein.

== Reception ==
Style was generally well received. "A delightful book," wrote Time and Tide, "exemplifying brilliantly all that it seeks to instill – enjoyment of reading and mastery of writing." It was Lucas's most successful book. He had long had a reputation as a stylist, (Note: Lucas's own early style had been analysed in A. J. J. Ratcliff's Prose of Our Time (London 1931). His later style can be seen in his review-cum-essay, 'Long Lives the Emperor' in The Historical Journal, Vol.8, No.1, Cambridge, 1965.) "one whose pen possesses the sparkle and fascination which made the essay, in the hands of writers such as Bacon and Montaigne, a thing of beauty and interest". Some reviewers expressed the view that "The book's most obvious merit lies in its quotations" (Rayner Heppenstall in the New Statesman). "There are almost as many in French as in English, and their range and aptness are remarkable." Others, however, felt that there should have been fewer examples from poetry and more from contemporary prose. The Listener approved "the entertaining relevance of anecdote". Sir Bruce Fraser praised Lucas's close analysis of faulty style: "The passage in which he dissects a great hunk of Swinburne's prose, reduces it by more than half, recognizes that it could be made shorter still, and ends by suggesting that it need not have been written at all, is in itself worth the whole price of the book". Raymond Mortimer in The Sunday Times, however, found the author "sometimes laboured in his anxiety to be debonair". Philip Toynbee of The Observer disliked the work and dismissed its author as "middlebrow": "There have been wonderful styles which illustrate the virtues of clarity, brevity, simplicity and vitality. Other styles, no less wonderful, have exhibited obscurity, amplitude, complexity and decadence. Good writers have been urbane, gay and healthy: other good writers have been boorish, melancholic and diseased... Mr Lucas pays lip-service to the recalcitrant disorder of the scene" but "writes far too briefly of variety". More recently, Joseph Epstein in The New Criterion (2011) considered the book "filled with fine things ... F. L. Lucas wrote the best book on prose composition, for the not-so-simple reason that, in the modern era, he was the smartest, most cultivated man to turn his energies to the task". The 2011 article "brought attention to this neglected classic and helped set in train its reissue".

== 'On the Fascination of Style' (1960) and 'The Art of Proverbs' (1965) ==
Lucas returned to the subject in a 4000-word essay, 'On the Fascination of Style', published in the March 1960 number of Holiday magazine. The essay reworks the core points of Style more succinctly, in a different order and with some changes in emphasis, and adds new examples and a few autobiographical anecdotes. It was reprinted in Birk and Birk, The Odyssey Reader: Ideas and Style (New York, 1968) and in McCuen & Winkler, Readings for Writers (New York, 2009). The essay was reissued in 2012 as 'How to Write Powerful Prose', by Harriman House Publishing, Petersfield.

His companion essay, 'The Art of Proverbs', published in the September 1965 number of Holiday magazine, explored two aspects of style – brevity and metaphor – in a celebration of world proverbs as a source of wit, wisdom, and insight into human nature and national character. The piece was reprinted in Mieder and Sobieski, Gold Nuggets or Fool's Gold? Magazine and Newspaper Articles on the (Ir)relevance of Proverbial Phrases (Burlington, 2006).
