= The Woman Clothed with the Sun =

Book by F. L. Lucas

- First edition (US)
- Author: F. L. Lucas
- Genre: Historical novel
- Publisher: Cassell (UK); Simon & Schuster (US)
- English publication date: August 1937

The Woman Clothed with the Sun; being The Confession of John McHaffie concerning his sojourn in the Wilderness among the folk called the Buchanites, is a historical novella by the British writer F. L. Lucas. It purports to be an account, written in 1814 by a Scottish minister of the Kirk in middle age and published posthumously, of his youthful bewitchment by Elspeth Buchan and of the time he spent in the 1780s among the Buchanites. First published in 1937, it was Lucas's second historical novella, the first being The Wild Tulip (1932); he had also published a prize-winning historical novel, Cécile (1930).

== Plot summary ==
The narrator, John McHaffie, the bookish 16-year-old son of a schoolmaster in Irvine, Ayrshire, "an overwrought lad and a Johnny-head-in-air", is loved by sensible Jenny Traquair, also 16, an orphan fostered in the McHaffie household. After an account of his childhood, the narrator describes the stir caused in his town in 1782–3 by the fanatical preaching in the Relief Church of the new minister, Hugh White, a fearsome "false Elijah" who has danced among the Shakers of Mother Ann Lee in America. White brings from Glasgow Elspeth Buchan, 44, the self-proclaimed 'Woman Clothed with the Sun' of Revelation. At first John joins the Irvine rabble in persecuting Elspeth and the Buchanites, a revivalist sect who believe they are the elect living in the Last Days, shortly to be translated en bloc to Heaven without tasting death. In reality John is secretly fascinated by Buchan's teaching that wedlock is now abolished and that men and women may couple freely. Elspeth one day finds him spying, asks him why he persecutes her, takes his hands in hers and quotes some erotic lines from The Song of Songs. He is struck by her fine eyes, coils of black hair and queenly bearing. "I read deep in Revelation and Daniel, till my wits were completely upside down." His obsession grows when he sees her dragged out of town by the mob, "her clothes rent to ribbons", her "white shoulders shining in the torchlight". Common-sense Jenny, alarmed, tries reason and mockery to cure him of his interest in this "doited auld ale-wife". On a chance errand, John overtakes the exiles on their way (1785) into the wilderness, to, as they believe, "a place prepared of God, for a time, and times, and half a time". Elspeth takes him to one side, again quotes Scripture ("Come, my beloved, let us go forth into the field. Behold, thou art fair, my love; behold, thou art fair; also our bed is green") and kisses him. Jenny later rounds on him as a "daft young lad beglammered by an auld spaewife might be his ain grandmither". A few weeks later a letter arrives from Elspeth inviting John to join the Society in its new commune in Dumfriesshire. Believing the world about to end, John opens his Bible at random:

The first time I opened, I read: "And Zorobabel begat Abiud; and Abiud begat Eliakim; and Eliakim begat Azov." This did not greatly guide me, so I tried a second time and found: "And they removed from Benejaahan, and encamped at Hor-hagidgad. And they went from Hor-hagidgad and pitched in Jotbathah." Here again I did not feel much enlightened. So I tried a third time and opened the Book, as it happened, at First Thessalonians, fifth and nineteenth: "Despise not prophesyings. Prove all things."

He steals away and joins the sect in the hills of Galloway. He finds its members "blithe as bees to work in the morning, blithe as bees when they returned at night," in the fullness of their faith that Heaven's gates stand already ajar. He perceives that they do indeed couple freely as the beasts that perish. Elspeth wastes little time in initiating the narrator, now 18. Next morning he feels bitterly that he has been false to Jenny; he would not like to think of her in such company. Among the faithful is Jean Gardner, "loveliest of lasses ... with great coils of auburn hair", whom "that ungodly young poet" Robert Burns had tried to lure from the sect. John notes many underhand infringements of the Society's rules by its male leaders. He describes the preparations for Ascension, as the "time for our translation heavenward was near at hand" : the forty-day fast, barricaded in their barn, and the sufferings it brings; the mockery of the locals; the desertion of one of their number and her calling in of the magistrates to save her starving children. Jenny meanwhile devises a stratagem to rescue John. She tells the Irvine magistrates (falsely) that John McHaffie made her pregnant before running off to join the Buchanites. He is summonsed and brought home; but in a few days he escapes and returns to the Society, just in time to witness the abortive Ascension on midsummer's dawn – a failure put down by Elspeth to lack of faith.

Months pass. The faithful (some forty) struggle on at a new location in Kirkcudbrightshire. John, his belief gone, stays on out of pity for and loyalty to Elspeth. Elspeth falls ill and dies. Hugh White buries her in secret and, producing proofs, tells her disciples that the body has been swept up to Heaven. John, disgusted, searches in secret for her grave. He discovers instead the graves of unwanted babies born to the sect. He is "resolved that this imposture should now finish" and calls in Sir Alexander Gordon, Sheriff of Kirkcudbright. In a torchlight scene, Sir Alexander forces Hugh White to disinter Elspeth's coffin. John surprises the gravediggers and accuses White, who defends himself: "Ye fool, canna ye understand that I could ill-use her and yet love her? That I couldna bear to see her shamed before the world? That they all should know, as I know now, that she was but a puir mortal body like us a' ?" Sir Alexander cautions White against further jugglery and advises him to return to America. The novella ends with Jenny arriving to ask John to come home.

In a coda we learn that the narrator returned to Irvine, took Sir Alexander's advice to go up to University of Edinburgh to read Theology, married Jenny (who vets his sermons before he preaches them), settled down as Minister of the Kirk, and dedicated his first sermon to Love.

== Themes ==
The narrative is John HcHaffie's "warning ... (particularly to young callants [lads] puffed up with a little learning) against enthusiasm and false prophets and headstrong wrestings of the Scriptures". "I saw clearly now," he writes, "that once false faiths begin, none can say how they will end". A secondary theme is that sons may react negatively to the virtues of their fathers, so that "through the contrariness of our fallen nature, the bairns might oft times have been better, had their parents been less good." (David McHaffie, who embodies 18th-century rationalism, is "a dour man who loved his duty above all else".) Commonsense Jenny ("as makes a man understand why the heathen Greeks made Wisdom itself a woman") is contrasted with Elspeth, whom the narrator nevertheless portrays sympathetically: "Truly (and it is some excuse for me) she was no ordinary woman." The rabble who persecute her, and the hypocrites within the sect, are more obviously condemned.

== Background ==
At the end of his Decline and Fall of the Romantic Ideal (1936) Lucas had expressed dissatisfaction with the role of literary critic that had established his reputation. According to his American publisher, he planned to turn increasingly to historical fiction to give expression to his beliefs and political convictions. After the cool reception of his novel Doctor Dido (1938), however, he turned instead to history-based poetry, not writing another novel till his retirement – The English Agent: A Tale of the Peninsular War (1969).

== Reception ==
J. D. Beresford in the Manchester Guardian said of The Woman Clothed with the Sun, "The manner of writing is that proper to the period, with a spicing of dialect, both so admirably rendered that we might easily be deceived into the belief that it is an authentic document." "As a pastiche it is brilliant," noted The Times Literary Supplement; "but if Scott or Stevenson had written the same story the 'something' missing in this" [inspiration] "would have been abundantly present". Forrest Reid in The Spectator found it a "delightful" account of Elspeth Buchan and her followers. "Mr Lucas can be amusing and at the same time very much in earnest. His method is ironic." The Scotsman praised the author's "fine sense of drama, remarkable powers of description, and admirable sense of style". Of the book as a whole Beresford wrote, "The stories have a forcible intellectual quality that makes them a real pleasure to read," while Time and Tide opined: "This sombre collection of brilliantly written stories will be a good choice for people who are consoled by the thought that the world never has been up to much."

== Publishing history ==
The novella was the title-story and longest (at some 25,000 words) in a collection of ten, published in 1937 by Cassell and Company of London and in 1938 by Simon & Schuster of New York, as The Woman Clothed with Sun, and Other Stories. Cassell's director was Lucas's former student Desmond Flower. The volume was reprinted in the UK in March 1939 and in the US in 1970.
