= Ariadne (poem) =

Longest poem of F. L. Lucas

- Author: F. L. Lucas
- Genre: Epic poem
- Publisher: Cambridge University Press, & Macmillan Company, New York
- Publication date: 1932

Ariadne (1932) is a short epic or long narrative poem of 3,300 lines, by the British poet F. L. Lucas. It tells the story of Theseus and Ariadne, with details drawn from various sources and original touches based on modern psychology. It was Lucas's longest poem. His other epic reworking of myth was Gilgamesh, King of Erech (1948).

== Summary ==
=== Book I ===
Athens assembles to hear news that the serial killers on the south road have been killed by an unknown traveller, acting alone. In old Aegeus's kingdom, dominated by the King's ambitious nephew Agrion, a reward is offered for the wanderer's head. Eyewitnesses give accounts. One unmasks a hooded youth in the crowd as the perpetrator. The youth identifies himself as the King's lost son, Theseus. Agrion, who has suborned the guard, attempts a coup. Theseus appeals to the people, who drive Agrion out. The same day, the Cretan ambassador, who has come for the Athenian tribute, demands satisfaction. Lots are drawn for seven youths and seven maidens to be sent to Crete (Lucas makes this a once-every-nine-years event). Queen Medea and her young son arrive to welcome Theseus. Her plot to poison him fails and her husband banishes her. Aegeus tells Theseus the story of his love for and betrayal of Aethra, Theseus's mother, and urges his son to value true love when he finds it. Theseus, resenting the Cretan yoke, takes the place of one of the doomed youths. Next morning the two ships sail for Crete. One of the maidens sings a farewell lament to Athens, voicing sorrow that she will die without ever having been loved.

=== Book II ===
The ships stop for the night at an uninhabited islet. Around the campfire, Euaemon, the Greek ship's master, pitying the young, tries to distract them with travellers' tales; but Aegle, the girl who sang the lament, demands to be told the truth about what lies in store. Euaemon tells the little he knows, including the usual story, that the monster in the Labyrinth is the offspring of Pasiphaë, Queen to Minos, by a bull-god. The young people pair off for the night, Theseus choosing Aegle, who has impressed him by her courage and grace. They become lovers. (Theseus had already seduced the pine-bender's young daughter on the way to Athens.) At dawn the south wind prevents departure; the party spend three days on the isle, during which time Theseus and Aegle are happy together. Reaching Crete, the Athenians, wondering at the primitive bull-totems, are led before King Minos and Queen Pasiphaë in Knossos. When Theseus's plea for clemency is brushed aside, Aegle reveals Theseus's identity, in the hope of saving his life – to no avail. Theseus wrenches a spear from a guard and has Minos at his mercy, but one of the King's daughters, the beautiful Ariadne, intervenes daringly to save her father, and Theseus is disarmed. As he is led out Theseus praises Ariadne for her courage, loyalty and beauty, adding: "May God give you, / One day, a lover as brave and fair and true!" Pasiphaë smiles darkly, having already divined the attraction between Theseus and Ariadne.

=== Book III ===
In her chamber that night Ariadne thinks about Theseus – and about the sort of husband her father is likely to choose for her. Her brilliant little sister Phaedra, who witnessed events in court and who is also smitten by Theseus, urges her to seek help from Daedalus, who built the Labyrinth. Daedalus, a Greek exile, has long loved Ariadne in silence, this fair-haired daughter of Minos by a Thracian captive-woman of royal blood. In the small hours Ariadne calls on Daedalus, who hints sadly that he has guessed the secret of the Minotaur. Ariadne doesn't want to know. She accepts his plan and bluffs her way into Theseus' cell, where she files his chain and hands over file, spool and dagger. "I half hate this land of weasel priests," she tells Theseus in the course of a passionate exchange. An escape plan is agreed, should Theseus survive. Next day, while the captives toil their way up Mount Juktas (Lucas places the Labyrinth in a cave-complex on Juktas), Ariadne uses Phaedra to pass a message to Euaemon, to delay his departure and watch for a signal. That night the signal is seen by Ariadne; she parts tearfully from Phaedra, and arrives on the beach in time to see the survivors of the Labyrinth staggering down from the hills. The ship slips away.

=== Book IV ===
On board, while the exhausted survivors sleep, Theseus tells Ariadne of the night's events: how the Athenian maidens were bathed and perfumed by African eunuchs and dressed as brides; how the captives were led into the cave, down mazy passages and dim chambers, each with statues of the Cretan snake-goddess; how the last chamber contained the horror: the Minotaur on a throne, before a flower-strewn bed, surrounded by the dead; how the priests and guards bound the Athenians with thongs and left. Theseus cut his thongs and freed his companion, Euthycles. The Minotaur, seeing the danger, seized a long sword to hold off the unarmed Greeks while it made to escape. Euthycles sprang at it and was killed, allowing Theseus time to crush the creature with its throne. They discover that the Minotaur was King Minos himself in a bull-mask. Hearing this, the horrified Ariadne thinks of the golden tress she left on her father's pillow, as a loving token of farewell. She absolves Theseus of blood-guilt. The ship beaches for the night on Naxos. Aegle watches Theseus sadly, then goes off alone. Theseus finds her, blames Aphrodite for sending him a new love, and offers her a dowry. Aegle is devastated. That night Theseus and Ariadne become lovers. He promises to make her Queen of Athens. At dawn Aegle's body is discovered. She has stabbed herself. Ariadne learns of Theseus's earlier love for Aegle, and decides to leave him. The single love based on ecstasy is what she wants (and which she later seeks in Dionysus). Too late, Theseus recognises that Aegle was his one true love. Approaching Phalerum he forgets to raise the signal white sail, Aegeus commits suicide, and the hero's homecoming is joyless.

== Verse form ==
The poem is in 'open' heroic couplets, with many run-on lines, the underlying iambic pentameter being varied by counterpoint and occasional trochaic lines. Other devices include a varying caesura and occasional hexameters and terminal triplets. Aegeus in Book I:–

"How strange, how strange the thing that is done and gone,
Past God's own power to undo; past man's wit,
When he looks back, himself to fathom it !
For I loved Aethra. – O learn this, my son,
This lesson I can teach, the only one –
I have paid to learn it. Think not true love grows
Through all the world, as the wild poppy blows
Red on a thousand fields, a thousand hills.
Youth thinks it so – to find just as it wills
The red bloom of desire in every lane,
Easy to pluck, to drop, to find again.
Youth does not know." The old man smiled to see
His son's eyes dreamy now with memory;
With memory of the Isthmus – that grim glen
Where he had slain the Pine-bender – and then
A rustle in the thicket, two brown eyes
Like a scared fawn's, and sweet low piteous cries,
As he dragged forth his quarry, a slim maid
Shy as a Dryad in a woodland glade,
Trembling and sobbing for her father's fate.
Sweet that had been, so sweet, as night grew late...

== Background and publication ==
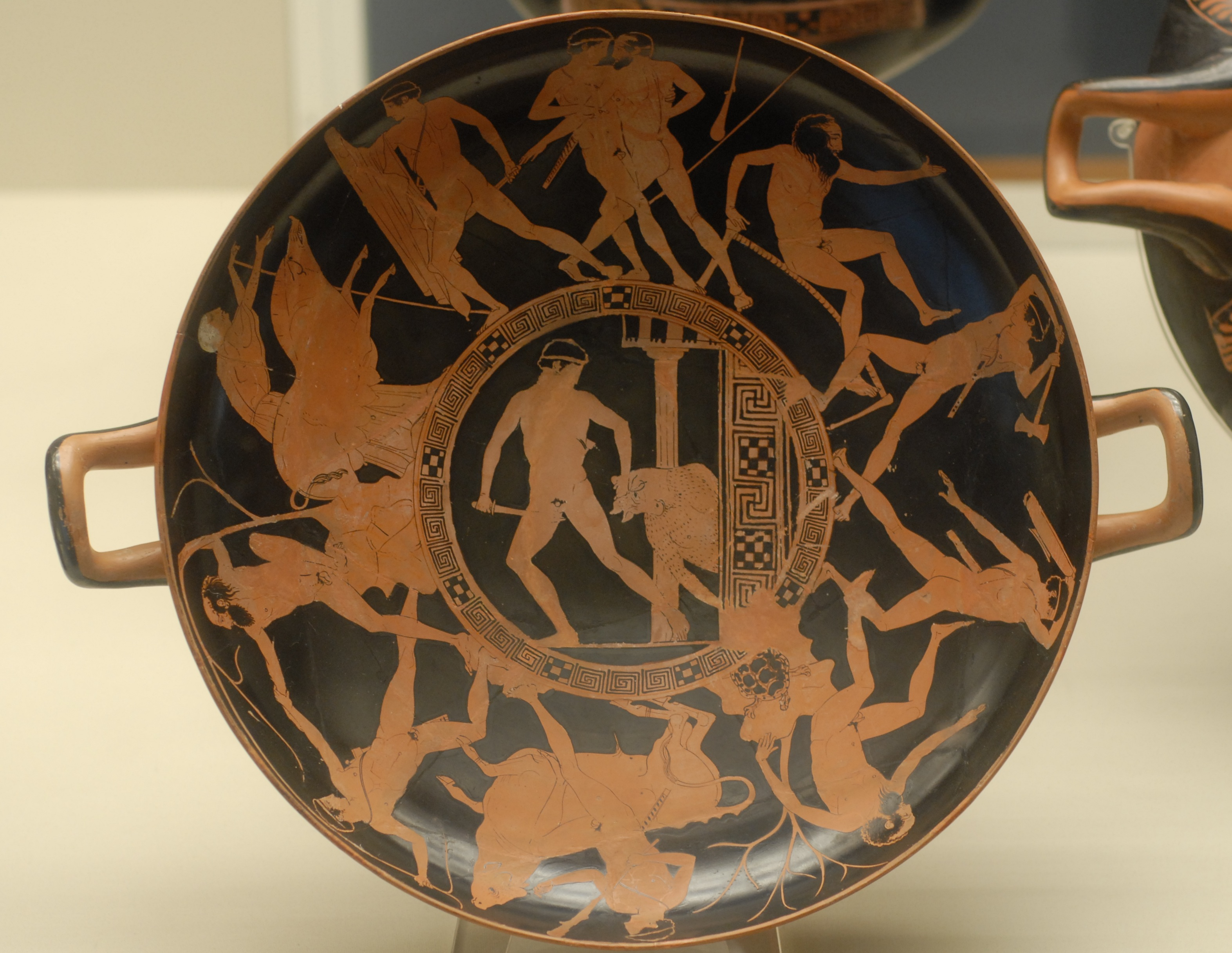
The Deeds of Theseus, Attic red-figured kylix, c.440–430 BC (from Vulci); British Museum

Ariadne was published by the Cambridge University Press and by the Macmillan Company, New York, in November 1932, in a limited edition of 500 copies. The Theseus and Minotaur device on the upper board (Theseus dragging the dead Minotaur into the light), and the Deeds of Theseus illustration on the title-page and dust-cover, were taken from the well-known Attic red-figured kylix, c.440–430 BC (from Vulci), in the British Museum. The University Press continued to use the Theseus and Minotaur device on the front of Lucas's books in the 1930s (and their postwar reprints). The poem was dedicated to Lucas's fiancée, the 21-year-old Girton Classics graduate Prudence Wilkinson (1911–1944), whom Lucas married in December 1932. It includes a serious-playful dedicatory love-poem to her, divided into Prologue and Epilogue. "The wild Greek hills," Lucas notes in the former,

And war, and death, and that worse pain that kills
Love in two hearts gown bitter – these I know:
They were little changed three thousand years ago.

The poem's emphasis on 'true love', on shared values of courage and loyalty, may be seen as its primary theme. The realistic, psychological interpretation of the Minotaur story reflects Lucas's interest in the discoveries of modern psychology. The contrast between light-loving Athens and benighted Minoan Crete, hag-ridden with religion, reflects another authorial preference. (The epigraph, from Bacchylides, is δίζησθαι δὲ φιλαγλάους Ἀθάνας, 'Set out for Athens, land that loves the light'.) Extracts from the poem were read on the BBC Home Service in 1934. Ariadne was reprinted by the Cambridge University Press in May 2014.

== Reception ==
Ariadne was, in the main, well received. "An exception to the generalisation that all modern epics are tedious," declared The Cambridge Review. "Its plot is a model of epic construction in its compactness, directness and speed." "The poetry is skilful," wrote the journal Books. "The parts concerning the lovers sometimes rise to a fine lyric passion." R. P. Blackmur singled out as forceful "the six-page passage [near the end] where Theseus, as a philanderer with good intentions, argues with Ariadne, who defends with resigned eloquence the ecstatic and single love". The Times Literary Supplement praised "the frequent grace of description. Lucas has studied the natural touch in every scene and every colloquy, giving to images of primitive force a modern psychological dress". William Plomer in The Spectator found the poem "better than many a modern novel. It is even in texture, agreeably and skilfully phrased, calls for no great intellectual effort, and would surely have pleased William Morris" (a reference to Morris's Jason). "But it makes no new music; never surprises by a fine excess." The poem was reviewed by Lucas's former tutee, Julian Bell, in the New Statesman and Nation. "The story is constructed with classic dexterity and neatness," Bell wrote, "and both story and verse have a breath-taking rapidity that is wholly admirable." He regretted, however, that Lucas had not used language in the modernist way, with obliqueness and ambiguity. The Listener did not share this regret: "While preserving the great metrical tradition," its reviewer wrote, "Ariadne is a continuous refreshment of it, and is free at once of archaic pedantries and modernist affectations." More recently, Simon Tidworth in The Quest for Theseus (1970) believed that making the Minotaur Minos in a bull-mask was "a real stroke of originality", but, comparing the two works, preferred Nikos Kazantzakis' drama Κούρος, ή Θησέας (Kouros, or Theseus ) (1949), as (in his view) richer in symbolism.
