= Elspeth Buchan =

Founder of the Buchanites

Elspeth Buchan (1738–1791) was the founder of a Scottish religious sect known as the Buchanites.

== Early life ==
She was born in 1738, the daughter of John Simpson and Margaret Gordon, who kept a wayside inn at Fatmacken, between Banff and Portsoy. In early life, she was employed in herding cows, and afterwards entered the house of a relation, by whom she was taught reading and sewing. During a visit to Greenock, she made the acquaintance of Robert Buchan, a working potter, whom she married. They quarrelled and separated, and in 1781 she removed with the children to Glasgow.

== Religious doctrines ==
Having heard Hugh White, of the Relief church at Irvine, preach in Glasgow at the April sacrament of 1783, she wrote him a letter expressing her high approval of his sermons, and stating that no preacher she had ever previously listened to had so fully satisfied her spiritual needs.

The result was that she removed to Irvine to enjoy the privilege of his ministry, and converted both him and his wife to the belief that she was a saint especially endowed and privileged by heaven, White's final conclusion being that she was the woman mentioned in the Revelation of St. John, while she declared him to be the man child she had brought forth.

On account of his proclamation of these peculiar doctrines, White was deposed from the ministry by the presbytery. In May 1784, the magistrates banished the sect from the burgh, and following the supposed guidance of the star which led the wise men to Bethlehem, they settled on the farm of New Cample, in the parish of Closeburn, Dumfriesshire. They were joined here by one of two persons in good positions in life, and their numbers ultimately reached forty-six. Mrs. Buchan, whom they named their "spiritual mother", professed to have the power of conferring the Holy Ghost by breathing, and also laid claim to certain prophetic gifts.

They believed in the millennium as close at hand, and were persuaded that they would not taste of death, but would be taken up to meet Christ in the air. The following account of them by Robert Burns, the poet, may be accepted as strictly accurate: "Their tenets are a strange jumble of enthusiastic jargon; among others she pretends to give them the Holy Ghost by breathing on them, which she does with postures and gestures that are scandalously indecent. They have likewise a community of goods, and live nearly an idle life, carrying on a great farce of pretended devotion in hams and woods, where they lodge and lie together, and hold likewise a community of women, as it is another of their tenets that they can commit no mortal sin".

It is affirmed that Robert Burns had an attachment to a young woman, Jean Gardner, who joined the Buchanites, and that he spent a whole night and day in vainly endeavouring to persuade her to return. His song "As I was a walking" was set to an air to which, according to him, the "Buchanites had set some of their nonsensical rhymes," for the composition of hymns was one of the gifts of Buchan.

In 1785, White issued Divine Dictionary, written by himself and "revised and approven by Elspeth Simpson". The death of Mrs. Buchan, in May 1791, dissipated the faith of most of her followers. White pretended that she was only in a trance, and had her buried clandestinely, but he afterwards renounced his belief in her promise to return and conduct them to the New Jerusalem. The last survivor of the sect was Andrew Innes, who died in 1846.

== Popular culture ==
Robert Burns refers to the Buchanites in some of his personal letters. The following lines attributed to him are thought to relate to Elspeth Buchan:

"The wicked ane frae Glasgow came,
In April auchty-three,
An' lodged her spawn among the saun,
An' noo her fry we see."

Buchan and her followers are the subject of a 1937 novella by F. L. Lucas, The Woman Clothed with the Sun, which takes the form of an account, written by a Scottish minister in middle age, of his youthful bewitchment by Elspeth and of his curious sojourn among the Buchanites.

Scots playwright Hamish MacDonald and Dogstar Theatre brought the tale of Elspeth Buchan and her followers to the stage after discovering the story in a local guidebook.

== Bibliography ==
- J. Train, The Buchanites from First to Last (Edinburgh, 1846).
