= Cecil McGivern =

British broadcasting executive and screenwriter (1907–1963)

Cecil McGivern CBE
- Born: 22 May 1907; Newcastle upon Tyne, England
- Died: 30 January 1963 (aged 55); Buckinghamshire, England
- Education: St Cuthbert's Grammar School
- Alma mater: Durham University
- Employer(s): BBC; The Rank Organisation; ITV
- Title: Controller of BBC Television Service (1950–1957)

Cecil McGivern CBE (22 May 1907, in Newcastle, England – 30 January 1963, in Buckinghamshire, England) was a British broadcasting executive, who initially worked for BBC Radio before transferring to BBC Television in the late 1940s. From 1950 to 1957 he served as the Controller of BBC Television Service, succeeding Norman Collins.

== Early life and career ==
The son of Irish immigrants, McGivern was educated at St Cuthbert's Grammar School and later attended Durham University. His initial ambition was to be an actor (he played the central role in the première of the thriller Land's End at the People's Theatre, Newcastle upon Tyne, in 1935), but he quickly realised that he lacked the necessary talent and so pursued a career as a teacher instead. He did, however, continue working in the theatre as a producer of amateur productions.

== Career ==
McGivern joined the BBC in 1936, working as a producer of drama and documentary programmes in his native Newcastle and also in Manchester. In 1939, he was promoted to occupy the newly created position of programmes director for the North East of England. However, he only held this post for a short time before being seconded to the BBC in London after the outbreak of war, to become part of a group of producers working on war-related programming. During World War II, he wrote and directed several acclaimed radio documentary features, such as Bombers Over Berlin, The Harbour Called Mulberry, Fighter Pilot, and Junction X.

Following the end of the war in 1945, McGivern left the staff of the BBC to join the Rank Organisation film company, where he worked as a screenwriter. Probably the best-known film on which he worked for the company was Great Expectations (1946), starring John Mills. The script was nominated for the Academy Award for Writing Adapted Screenplay.

Despite this success in the film industry, however, in 1947, McGivern returned to the BBC, this time working for the BBC Television Service based at Alexandra Palace. As programme director, he worked under the station's controller, Norman Collins, to establish the popularity of the fledgling channel, with one of the major events covered during this time being the 1948 Summer Olympics, broadcast live by the BBC from Wembley Stadium in London. After Collins left the BBC in 1950 in protest at George Barnes being appointed as his superior, McGivern was elevated to succeed him as controller of programmes.

McGivern's period in Control of the channel's output saw a rapid increase of the television service's popularity, helped greatly by the 20 million audience for the 1953 coronation of Queen Elizabeth II. However, his tenure also saw the arrival of a commercial competitor, ITV, in 1955, breaking the BBC's broadcasting monopoly. In 1957 he was promoted to become the deputy director of BBC Television, but when this post was abolished in a reorganisation of the television service's management structure in 1961, he elected to once more leave the BBC rather than take the scriptwriting post he had been offered.

He joined ITV's northern weekday franchise holder Granada Television as an executive producer.

== Death ==
In January 1963 McGivern was involved in an accident late at night at his home in Buckinghamshire, setting fire to his clothes while attempting to light a cigarette. He was badly burned and died in hospital on 30 January 1963, with the coroner later recording an official verdict of death by misadventure.

== Awards and honours ==
In 1954, he was appointed a CBE for his services to broadcasting, and in 1962 received the Desmond Davis Award for Services to Television.

Media offices
Preceded by Norman Collins	Controller of BBC Television Service; 1950-1957	Succeeded by Kenneth Adam
