= Doctor Dido =

1938 novel by F. L. Lucas

- Author: F. L. Lucas
- Genre: Historical novel
- Publisher: Cassell
- English publication date: 8 September 1938

Doctor Dido is a historical novel by the British writer F. L. Lucas. First published in 1938, it was his third novel (not including the novella The Wild Tulip, 1932). With much local and antiquarian detail, it tells the story of Samuel Plampin, Doctor of Divinity at Cambridge and Vicar of St Peter's Babraham, who in 1792 brings to the vicarage as his housekeeper a young Frenchwoman he finds in Cambridge, a destitute refugee from The Terror.

== Plot summary ==
Just arrived in Cambridge on a sodden evening in September 1792 is Mademoiselle Sophie Letourneur, 26, a spirited femme de chambre in the household of the Duc and Duchesse de la Rochefoucauld-d'Enville. She has travelled for nine days from Revolution-torn Paris, carrying a secret message from her Anglophile master to Prime Minister Pitt. She had been told Pitt was in his constituency; now she learns he is at Stowe. She speaks little English, has been robbed on the way and is destitute. She is rescued by Samuel Plampin of Trinity, 45, Doctor of Divinity, King's Reader in Hebrew at the University, and Vicar of St Peter's Babraham. A bachelor (as Fellows had to be then) and hoping for a little adventure, he offers her hospitality for the night. (He is fluent in French, having spent six months in Paris in 1772 "bear-leading a rich lordling".) Next day they travel to Stowe, where Sophie learns from Pitt that her master has been killed and that she cannot safely return to France. Plampin, already drawn to her ("I had forgotten how exhilarating a clever woman can be") invites her to remain with him as his housekeeper.

His very ears seemed dumbly to protest, as they heard his mouth utter this egregious folly.

She accepts. A friendship develops. He is kind and amusing, regaling her with anecdotes from the parish and University. An Enlightenment man, he is attracted by her French grace, wit and good sense. On New Year's Eve he proposes marriage; she declines, but agrees to be his mistress. Villagers and University colleagues guess the truth. "Come down off it, Tim Tolliday," says a villager to Plampin's coachman in the 'George' one evening, when the latter has been defending "Emmy Grays" and "Parson's Mamzell". "We all knows what Frenchies be." In an excruciating scene the unimaginative Reverend Aaron Knatchbull of neighbouring Hadworth proposes to Sophie, in vain. Ten years pass, happy for Plampin, content for Sophie – "though there were moments when she would feel stifled among these East Anglian cabbages, buried alive in these foggy turnip-fields" – years clouded only by heresy-hunts of supposed Jacobins in Cambridge and grim news from France.

The Peace of 1802 brings the chance for émigrés to return home and for the British to travel abroad once more. Madame Letourneur longs to see her daughter again; Plampin welcomes the chance of a holiday. But in Paris things start to go wrong. So much that Plampin had admired about the France of his youth has been swept away (though he had begun by admiring the Revolution). The old values have been replaced by vulgarity, aggressiveness, Napoleonic fervour. Plampin grows irritable and finds himself at loggerheads with Sophie's brother Charles, a cocky young Captain of Hussars, who regards the English doctor as grotesque and a poor match for his sister. Only the gracious Madame Letourneur is true to the France Plampin loved. Sophie meets Victor Duroc, Captain of Engineers, a former childhood friend. She grows uneasy and three times begs Plampin to take her back to England: but he is now enjoying the Bibliothèque nationale and the art treasures recently taken from Italy by Bonaparte. He brushes aside her fears. Growing estranged, she goes to amusements without him, wears make-up, dresses in the Grecian style. They quarrel. Victor, she admits to her mother, makes her feel for the first time in her life "alive". One day Plampin returns from the library to find her gone. A sad, guilt-ridden letter from Sophie informs him that she is now Madame Duroc and on her way to Saint-Domingue in the Caribbean.

He understood too well. In the grey light of disillusion, he saw now his own past folly; as a traveller who has climbed some height leading only into a wilderness, not homeward, looking back too late through the last pallors of sunset, sees all too clearly how and where he went astray.

Plampin suffers an immediate collapse. With sensitivity and tact, Madame Letourneur nurses him; at the earliest opportunity he returns to England. Babraham and Cambridge buzz with gossip about his solo return. He is nicknamed "Doctor Dido" by unkind colleagues and students. Home is full of sad reminders of Sophie. His faith lost, Plampin can no longer bear his ecclesiastical duties, resigns his living, and returns to college. No longer believing in scholarship or the future, he abandons his life-work, A Natural History of Enthusiasm (planned as a sly Gibbonian counterblast to all things Romantic). The Combination-Room is stifling with petty rivalries and malice. He finds solace for his unhappiness by tutoring bright young students, by botanizing among the hedgerows and woods of East Anglia, and by visits to the North and the West Country. Ten lonely years pass. One day a letter from old Madame Letourneur brings news that both Sophie and Victor Duroc are dead, drowned in the crossing of the Beresina in November 1812 during the Retreat from Moscow. In the Combination-Room on New Year's Eve 1812, as the port goes round, Plampin is taunted by a colleague for having taken "one French lesson too many". "If you refer to the lady who did me the honour to keep house for me," replies Plampin, breathing heavily, "I have had my last lesson from her." He reads to the hushed gathering a letter dictated to an orderly by Captain Charles Letourneur, now a mutilé de guerre, describing the horrors of the Crossing of the Beresina and the details of Sophie's death (she had abandoned the safety of Danzig to nurse her wounded husband during the retreat). In the silence that follows, Plampin walks out. One of the dons acidly quotes Scripture: "The lips of a strange woman drop as a honeycomb, and her mouth is smoother than oil: But her end is bitter as wormwood, sharp as a two-edged sword." The uneasy talk that follows is broken by the entry of a college servant, who has just found Plampin hanged.

== Background ==
The novel was written in the shadow of the coming war (see F. L. Lucas, Appeasement). In his 1938 Journal Lucas described it as "filled, between the lines, with all our hopes and fears for present and future, and dedicated, with growing misgivings for that future, 'To the Enduring Friendship of England and France'." Its depiction of the Napoleonic war-lust gripping France in the early 19th century foreshadows that of Hitler's Germany:

Suddenly all his self-centred pain lost itself once more in an infinite pity ... for the whole of this human race so mad to heap sorrows of its own seeking on the sorrows nothing can avoid.

The policy of Appeasement, which Lucas deplored, colours other passages: "To the English, she reflected, clear-headedness is indecent – one's mind's must always be properly clothed in a chaste modicum of cloud... For the present she decided after all to shut her eyes, English-fashion, and drift." For Lucas's attitude to 18th Century France, see Cécile (1930), Background.

Lucas's Journal reveals that the death of Shelagh Clutton-Brock (see F. L. Lucas, Personal life) was much in his mind as he was writing Docto Dido, his sense of sorrow and loss probably colouring his account of Plampin's sorrow for the lost Sophie.

== Themes ==
Doctor Dido is the familiar story of the middle-aged bachelor who falls in love with a woman much younger than himself, and pays for much bliss with much unhappiness. It explores "The dreadful fatality of passion, its inhuman indifference, once its tide has turned, to all that the most devoted adoration can ever do to turn it back again". It is, in addition, a satire on University life, contrasting the parochialism of Cambridge with the world-shaking events on the Continent, the malice of the Combination-Room with the kindliness of individuals. It disapproves of the monasticism imposed on dons by the ban on married Fellows:

—"Good God, Pellew, without assistance I don't believe you would know a woman from an isosceles triangle."
—"I would not go quite so far as that. I know something of isosceles triangles."

Like the earlier Cécile (1930) and the later English Agent (1969), Doctor Dido traces the tension between 18th-century rationalism and, in varying forms, Romantic unreason. Samuel Plampin is a man of the Age of Reason who has outlived his era and feels alienated by the new world. Too late, he realises that he, the satirical historian of "Enthusiasm", has himself been guilty of Romantic excess. Lucas's hostility to religion is another undercurrent in the novel, as it was in Cécile and in the novella The Woman Clothed with the Sun (1937). When Plampin adduces Mr Paley's watchmaker analogy to try to convince Sophie, she crushes him with the reply: "Mon ami, if as he says a watch implies a watchmaker, then a crime implies a criminal... Either abandon all reasoning for ever, or admit that God is meaner than yourself – you who would never will a single ant an instant's pain."

== Reception ==
The novel had mixed reviews. "The book wears altogether too studied an air," noted The Times Literary Supplement; "it carries a miscellaneous load of literary learning with a jocular lightness that seems rather forced and all too soon becomes monotonous. Mr Lucas may claim complete realism for his study of heavily academic manners, but the fact remains that realism of this sort makes for fatiguing reading." "Doctor Dido has its longueurs," admitted another reviewer. "Its brilliant scenes of Cambridge university life at the end of the eighteenth century are too cruel." Forrest Reid in The Spectator disagreed: "It has far too much vitality to be depressing," he wrote, "and for the reader at least, if not for Dr Plampin, there is the consolation of humour, wit, and irony." Several reviewers noted the novel's emotive appeal. "The futility and loneliness which overwhelm the returned Dr Plampin," noted Desmond Shawe-Taylor in the New Statesman, "are so touchingly conveyed that we find ourselves at last really concerned for this author of A Natural History of Enthusiasm who had been unable to buttress his own heart against the unreasonable tides of passion." "It deserves to be read and appreciated," stated The Cornhill. "Dr Plampin and Sophie will not readily fade from the reader's remembrance." Appraising Doctor Dido in The Cambridge Review, D. A. Winstanley, author of The University of Cambridge in the Eighteenth Century (1922), one of Lucas's sources, thought the novel "most charming": "Nor is it only for its human appeal that this book deserves to be read. If it contained nothing but its descriptions of Cambridge scenery it would be a thing of delight."

== Publishing history ==
The novel was published on 8 September 1938 by Cassell and Company of London, whose director was Lucas's former student Desmond Flower. It sold slowly. Cassell's London warehouse was destroyed in the Blitz, with the result that copies of the novel are now scarce. There was no US or Canadian edition. Flower nevertheless considered Doctor Dido Lucas's most successful novel artistically, and in 1967, at the time of Lucas's death, was planning to reprint it. Priority, however, was given to Lucas's new novel, The English Agent, written in his retirement (published posthumously by Cassell in 1969), and the planned reprint of Doctor Dido came to nothing.
