= Charles Mauron =

French translator

Charles Mauron (French: [moʁɔ̃]; 27 June 1899 – 5 December 1966) was a French translator of contemporary English authors, including E. M. Forster and Virginia Woolf, and a literary critic who made use of psychoanalytic literary criticism. He is noted for his books Aesthetics and Psychology (1935) and Des métaphores obsédantes au mythe personnel (1962). He was married from 1919 to 1949 to the writer Marie Mauron (1896–1986), and their home in Saint-Rémy-de-Provence became a focal-point in the inter-war years for their friends in the Bloomsbury Group.

== Biography ==
Charles Mauron was born in 1899 in Saint-Rémy-de-Provence, and attended the Lycée Thiers secondary school in Marseille. He achieved a diplôme d'études supérieures in chemistry from Aix-Marseille University, however failing eyesight prevented him from performing laboratory work, leading him to pursue his personal passion of literature instead.

He died in Saint-Rémy-de-Provence and is buried in its cemetery.

== Psychocriticism ==
In 1963, Charles Mauron conceived a structured method to interpret literary works via psychoanalysis. The study implied four different phases:

1. The creative process is akin to dreaming awake: as such, it is a mimetic, and cathartic, representation of an unconscious impulse or desire that is best expressed and revealed by metaphors and symbols.
2. Then, the juxtaposition of a writer's works leads the critic to define symbolical themes.
3. These metaphorical networks are significant of a latent inner reality.
4. They point at an obsession just as dreams can do. The last phase consists in linking the writer's literary creation to his own personal life.

The author cannot be reduced to a ratiocinating self: his own more or less traumatic biographical past, the cultural archetypes that have suffused his "soul" ironically contrast with the conscious self, The chiasmic relation between the two tales may be seen as a sane and safe acting out. A basically unconscious sexual impulse is symbolically fulfilled in a positive and socially gratifying way, a process known as sublimation.
