= Cecil Trouncer =

English actor (1898–1953)

- in The Guinea Pig (1948)
- Born: Cecil Stallard Trouncer; 5 April 1898; Southport, Lancashire, England
- Died: 15 December 1953 (aged 55); Fulham, London, England

Cecil Stallard Trouncer (5 April 1898 – 15 December 1953) was an English actor. His daughter Ruth Trouncer also took up acting.

== Early life ==
Cecil Trouncer was born in Southport on 5 April 1898 and was educated at Clifton College. During the First World War he served in the 3rd Battalion, of the Dorset Regiment.

== Filmography ==
- Pygmalion (1938)
- While the Sun Shines (1947)
- London Belongs to Me (1948)
- Saraband for Dead Lovers (1948)
- The Guinea Pig (1948)
- The Lady with a Lamp (1951)
- The Magic Box (1951)
- The Pickwick Papers (1952)
- Isn't Life Wonderful! (1953)
- The Weak and the Wicked (1954)
