= W. J. H. Sprott =

British psychologist and writer (1897–1971)

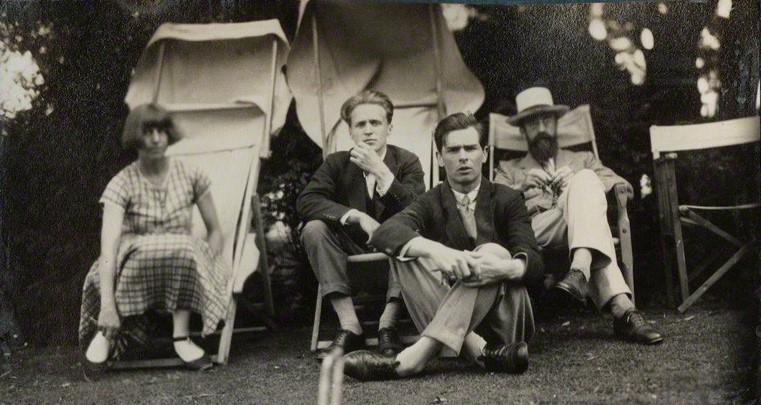
By Lady Ottoline Morrell (1873–1938), vintage snapshot print/NPG Ax142600. Dora Carrington; Stephen Tomlin; Walter John Herbert ('Sebastian') Sprott; Lytton Strachey, June 1926

Walter John Herbert Sprott (19 April 1897 – 2 September 1971), known to friends as 'Sebastian' Sprott, and also known as Jack Sprott, was a British psychologist and writer.

== Life ==
Sprott was born on 19 April 1897 at Sillwood Place, Crowborough, Sussex, to Herbert Sprott and his wife, née Mary Elizabeth Williams. He was educated at Felsted School and Clare College, Cambridge, where he became a member of the Cambridge Apostles. He was invalidated from serving in the military during the First World War and taught in preparatory schools. In the 1920s, he became acquainted with other members of the Bloomsbury Group. He was romantically involved with the economist John Maynard Keynes, who was at the time also seeing the ballerina Lydia Lopokova. Sprott's affair with Keynes ended after Keynes married Lopokova. After a job as a demonstrator at the Psychological Laboratory in Cambridge, he moved to the University of Nottingham, where he eventually became professor of philosophy.

He died on 2 September 1971 at Langham Road, Blakeney, Norfolk.

== Works ==
- (tr.) Physique and character; an investigation of the nature of constitution and of the theory of temperament by Ernst Kretschmer, 1925. The International Library of Psychology, Philosophy and Scientific Method.
- (tr.) New introductory lectures on psycho-analysis by Sigmund Freud. New York: W.W. Norton, 1933.
- General psychology, 1937
- Sociology, 1949
- Social psychology, 1952
- Science and social action, 1954
- Human groups, 1958

== See also ==
- List of Bloomsbury Group people
