= 12th Tony Awards =

1958 US theatrical awards ceremony

- Date: April 13, 1958
- Location: Waldorf-Astoria; New York City
- Hosted by: Bud Collyer
- Most wins: The Music Man (6)
- Most nominations: The Music Man (9)

Television/radio coverage
- Network: none

The 12th Annual Tony Awards took place at the Waldorf-Astoria Grand Ballroom on April 13, 1958. Bud Collyer was the Master of Ceremonies. For the second year the program was not telecast, due to a strike against WCBS-TV.

== Eligibility ==
Shows that opened on Broadway during the 1957 season before February 28, 1958 are eligible.

Original plays

- Blue Denim
- A Boy Growing Up
- The Cave Dwellers
- The Chairs
- Cloud 7
- Compulsion
- Copper and Brass
- The Dark at the Top of the Stairs
- The Day the Money Stopped
- The Egghead
- The Entertainer
- Fair Game
- The First Gentleman
- The Genius and the Goddess
- Good as Gold
- The Greatest Man Alive
- Hide and Seek
- I Knock at the Door
- The Infernal Machine
- Interlock
- The Lesson
- Look Back in Anger
- Look Homeward, Angel
- Maybe Tuesday
- Miss Isobel
- Miss Lonelyhearts
- Monique
- A Moon for the Misbegotten
- Nature's Way
- Nude With Violin
- Orpheus Descending
- Romanoff and Juliet
- The Rope Dancers
- A Shadow of My Enemy
- The Sin of Pat Muldoon
- The Square Root of Wonderful
- Summer of the 17th Doll
- Sunrise at Campobello
- Time Remembered
- Two for the Seesaw
- Under Milk Wood
- Winesburg, Ohio

Original musicals

- The Body Beautiful
- Jamaica
- Livin' The Life
- Mask and Gown
- The Music Man
- New Girl in Town
- Oh, Captain!
- Portofino
- Rumple
- Shinbone Alley
- Simply Heavenly
- West Side Story

Play revivals

- The Country Wife
- The Duchess of Malfi
- Hotel Paradiso
- Makropoulos Secret
- Mary Stuart
- Present Laughter

Musical revivals

- Brigadoon
- Carousel
- Ziegfeld Follies

== The ceremony ==
Presenters: Sydney Chaplin, Greer Garson, Judy Holliday, Celeste Holm, Nancy Kelly, Mary Martin, Elsa Maxwell, Laurence Olivier, Tyrone Power, Martha Scott, Phil Silvers, Walter Slezak. Performers were Mindy Carson and Bill Hayes. Music was by Meyer Davis and his Orchestra.

== Winners and nominees ==
Winners are in bold

Best Play	Best Musical
**Sunrise at Campobello – Dore Schary**; The Dark at the Top of the Stairs – William Inge; Look Back in Anger – John Osborne; Look Homeward, Angel – Ketti Frings; Romanoff and Juliet – Peter Ustinov; The Rope Dancers – Morton Wishengrad; Time Remembered – Jean Anouilh with English version by Patricia Moyes; Two for the Seesaw – William Gibson	**The Music Man**; Jamaica; New Girl in Town; Oh, Captain!; West Side Story
Best Performance by a Leading Actor in a Play	Best Performance by a Leading Actress in a Play
**Ralph Bellamy – Sunrise at Campobello as Franklin Delano Roosevelt**; Richard Burton – Time Remembered as Prince Albert; Hugh Griffith – Look Homeward, Angel as W.O. Gant; Laurence Olivier – The Entertainer as Archie Rice; Anthony Perkins – Look Homeward, Angel as Eugene Gant; Peter Ustinov – Romanoff and Juliet as The General; Emlyn Williams – A Boy Growing Up as Performer	**Helen Hayes – Time Remembered as The Duchess of Pont-Au-Bronc**; Wendy Hiller – A Moon for the Misbegotten as Josie Hogan; Eugenie Leontovich – The Cave Dwellers as The Queen; Siobhán McKenna – The Rope Dancers as Margaret Hyland; Mary Ure – Look Back in Anger as Alison Porter; Jo Van Fleet – Look Homeward, Angel as Eliza Gant
Best Performance by a Leading Actor in a Musical	Best Performance by a Leading Actress in a Musical
**Robert Preston – The Music Man as Harold Hill**; Eddie Foy Jr. – Rumple as Rumple; Ricardo Montalbán – Jamaica as Koli; Tony Randall – Oh, Captain! as Captain Henry St. James	**Thelma Ritter – New Girl in Town as Marthy Owen** (tie); **Gwen Verdon – New Girl in Town as Anna Christopherson** (tie); Lena Horne – Jamaica as Savannah; Beatrice Lillie – Ziegfeld Follies as Various Characters
Best Performance by a Supporting or Featured Actor in a Play	Best Performance by a Supporting or Featured Actress in a Play
**Henry Jones – Sunrise at Campobello as Louis McHenry Howe**; Sig Arno – Time Remembered as Ferdinand; Theodore Bikel – The Rope Dancers as Dr. Jacobson; Pat Hingle – The Dark at the Top of the Stairs as Rubin Flood; George Relph – The Entertainer as Billy Rice	**Anne Bancroft – Two for the Seesaw as Gittel Mosca**; Brenda de Banzie – The Entertainer as Phoebe Rice; Joan Blondell – The Rope Dancers as Mrs. Farrow; Mary Fickett – Sunrise at Campobello as Eleanor Roosevelt; Eileen Heckart – The Dark at the Top of the Stairs as Lottie Lacey
Best Performance by a Supporting or Featured Actor in a Musical	Best Performance by a Supporting or Featured Actress in a Musical
**David Burns – The Music Man as Mayor Shinn**; Ossie Davis – Jamaica as Cicero; Cameron Prud'Homme – New Girl in Town as Chris; Iggie Wolfington – The Music Man as Marcellus Washburn	**Barbara Cook – The Music Man as Marian Paroo**; Susan Johnson – Oh, Captain! as Mae; Carol Lawrence – West Side Story as Maria; Jackie McKeever – Oh, Captain! as Mrs. Maud St. James; Josephine Premice – Jamaica as Ginger
Best Director	Best Choreography
**Vincent J. Donehue – Sunrise at Campobello**; Morton DaCosta – The Music Man; Peter Hall – The Rope Dancers; George Roy Hill – Look Homeward, Angel; Elia Kazan – The Dark at the Top of the Stairs; Arthur Penn – Two for the Seesaw	**Jerome Robbins – West Side Story**; Bob Fosse – New Girl in Town; Onna White – The Music Man
Best Scenic Design	Best Costume Design
**Oliver Smith – West Side Story**; Boris Aronson – A Hole in the Head / Orpheus Descending / The Rope Dancers; Ben Edwards – The Dark at the Top of the Stairs; Peter Larkin – Blue Denim / Compulsion / Good as Gold / Miss Isobel; Jo Mielziner – The Day the Money Stopped / Look Homeward, Angel / Miss Lonelyhearts / Oh, Captain! / The Square Root of Wonderful; Oliver Smith – Brigadoon / Carousel / Jamaica / Nude with Violin / Time Remembered / West Side Story	**Motley – The First Gentleman**; Lucinda Ballard – Orpheus Descending; Motley – The Country Wife / The First Gentleman / Look Back in Anger / Look Homeward, Angel / Shinbone Alley; Irene Sharaff – West Side Story; Miles White – Jamaica / Oh, Captain! / Time Remembered
Best Conductor and Musical Director	Best Stage Technician
**Herbert Greene – The Music Man**; Max Goberman – West Side Story	**Harry Romar – Time Remembered**; Sammy Knapp – The Music Man

== Special awards ==
- New York Shakespeare Festival, for presenting free performances in Central Park and the Hecksher Theater
- Mrs. Louise Beck, for fifteen years of untiring dedication to the American Theatre Wing, which she served as treasurer, secretary and chairman of the board of directors. (Presented by Elaine Perry, daughter of Antoinette Perry.)
- Circle in the Square, Phoenix Theatre, Esther Hawley

=== Multiple nominations and awards ===
These productions had multiple nominations:

- 9 nominations: The Music Man
- 7 nominations: Jamaica, Look Homeward, Angel and Time Remembered
- 6 nominations: Oh, Captain!, The Rope Dancers and West Side Story
- 5 nominations: The Dark at the Top of the Stairs, New Girl in Town and Sunrise at Campobello
- 3 nominations: The Entertainer, Look Back in Anger and Two for The Seesaw
- 2 nominations: Orpheus Descending and Romanoff and Juliet

The following productions received multiple awards.

- 6 wins: The Music Man
- 4 wins: Sunrise at Campobello
- 2 wins: New Girl in Town, Time Remembered and West Side Story

== See also ==
- 30th Academy Awards
