= John Marriott (actor) =

American actor

- A 1953 promotional photo of Marriott
- Born: September 30, 1893; Boley, Indian Territory, United States
- Died: April 5, 1977 (aged 83); Jamaica, New York, United States
- Occupation: Actor
- Years active: 1922–76

John Marriott (September 30, 1893 – April 5, 1977) was an American actor of the stage, film and screen, whose career spanned five decades. His acting career began on the stage in Cleveland, prior to his moving to New York City, where he was a regular performer on the Broadway stage. In the 1940s he also began to perform in films, when he reprised his role from the hit Broadway play, The Little Foxes, in the William Wyler movie of the same name, starring Bette Davis. While he appeared infrequently in films (only ten during his career), he was quite active in theater, both on Broadway and in regional productions. His final performance was on-screen, in the Al Pacino film, Dog Day Afternoon.

== Life and career ==
=== 1930s and 1940s ===
Marriott was born in Boley, Indian Territory which is now a part of Oklahoma. He died in Jamaica, Queens, New York City. He began his acting career as a member of the Karamu Players in Cleveland in 1922. He was a member of the Cleveland Playhouse theater company. His first significant role was in the short-lived Broadway production, Too Many Boats, which opened at the Playhouse Theatre on September 11, 1934, but ran for only seven performances. Over the next 40 years he would appear in over 20 Broadway productions. In 1936 he appeared in a production of Sweet River, an adaptation of Harriet Beecher Stowe's Uncle Tom's Cabin at the 55th Street Theater. In 1939 he originated the role of Cal in The Little Foxes, which opened on February 15 at the National Theatre and ran for 410 performances.

As the new decade dawned, Marriott appeared at the Flatbush Theater in a revival of Langston Hughes' melodrama, Mulatto. In 1941 he reprised his role in the William Wyler film version of The Little Foxes, which stars Bette Davis. Marriott was one of five members of the original Broadway cast to appear in the film. After his foray into film, he would return to New York to focus on his stage career over the next decade. In 1941 he appeared in the production of The Pursuit of Happiness, starring Francis Lederer at the Flatbush Theater. In 1942, he originated the role of Rodney in Janie, which ran for 642 performances at five different theaters from 1942 to 1944. The play would be made into a film by Michael Curtiz in 1942, although Marriott was not selected for the film's cast. Marriott would also appear in regional theater productions, as he did in a 1944 version of Elena Miramova's play, Dark Eyes in Stamford, Connecticut. Also in 1944, he appeared in the Broadway production of No Way Out, at the Cort Theater. In 1946 he appeared in the role of Dr. Einstein in the all-Black production of Arsenic and Old Lace, in the debut production of the McKinley Square Players, which starred Abbie Mitchell, Ruby Dee, and Avon Long. Also in 1946 he originated the role of Joe Mott, one of the major parts in the Eugene O'Neill classic, The Iceman Cometh, which opened at the Martin Beck Theatre on October 9. Marriott was the only Black member of the cast, and after the play opened he said, "I've enjoyed this part more than any I've ever done. Joe Mott, the character I portray, is a real part in the story. This looks as if, at last, there might be a breaking away from the usual type-casting of butlers or valets Negroes formerly had to do."

Perhaps the height of his career came in 1948, when he had one of the leads in the American production of Jean-Paul Sartre's The Respectful Prostitute, which as a one-act play, was one of two plays presented at Cort Theatre, the other being The Happy Journey to Trenton and Camden. The two one-acts previewed at the New Stages Theater in Greenwich Village, prior to opening on March 16 at the Cort and running for 318 performances, closing on December 18, 1948. Marriott's performance would be lauded as "graceful". In September 1948, when Rex Ingram was arrested for violating the Mann Act, Marriott replaced him in the lead in Charleston 1822, a drama by Dorothy Heyward which was in previews in New Haven, Connecticut. The play would be retitled Let My People Free, and prior to moving to more previews in Philadelphia, Marriott would leave the cast. In 1949, Marriott was cast as one of the leads, Arrafi, in the Barrie Stavis drama, The Sun and I, which opened on March 20 at the New Stages Theater in Greenwich Village. Later that year, Marriott reprised his role in The Respectful Prostitute at the Flatbush Theater in Brooklyn. Also in 1949, Marriott would appear on the new medium, television, when he appeared in an episode of The Philco-Goodyear Television Playhouse, titled "The Lonely", which originally aired on September 25. Over the next three years he would appear in several television productions, including the episode "The Twentieth Century" of The Ford Theatre Hour (1949), which starred Fredric March and Eli Wallach; a 1950 episode of The Web (1950), entitled "Stone Cold Dead", which starred John Carradine; and the episode titled "Key to the Death House" on the Dumont Network series, The Plainclothesman in January 1950.

=== 1950s, 1960s and 1970s ===
In 1951, Marriott had a supporting role in a revival of the Pulitzer Prize-winning play, The Green Pastures, which also co-starred Alonzo Bosan and Ossie Davis, all of whom received positive reviews for their performances. That same year, Marriott would appear in the George S. Kaufman play, The Small Hours, which had a short run at the National Theatre in February and March. On the small screen that year, his performances included the season finale episode of the Westinghouse Summer Theater, entitled "The Guinea Pigs". In 1952, John Wexley's play, The Last Mile, was performed on television, with Marriott in one of the leading roles. In 1953 Marriott returned to the big screen with a featured role in The Joe Louis Story, starring Coley Wallace. That year he would also appear on the television series, Harlem Detective. As part of the DuMont Television Network's anthology series, One Man's Story, Marriott portrayed the title character in "The Ordeal of Frederick Douglass". His performance in "The Challenge", a story by Jerome Coopersmith, on CBS Television's Lamp Unto My Feet program, was given very positive reviews, with one source stating that he "... gave one of the finest characterizations of his career." In between his appearances on television and Broadway, Marriott continued to appear in regional productions as well, as he did in 1954 in a production of Magic Morning. Marriott had a significant, if somewhat smaller, role in 1956's The Ponder Heart, which opened in February at the Music Box Theatre and ran for almost 150 performances. This was followed in 1957 by a major role in Orpheus Descending, by Tennessee Williams. Although the play was not considered successful, running for only 68 performances, his performance received warm reviews. In closing out the decade, Marriott had a significant role in The Miracle Worker, which opened in October 1959, and ran for over 700 performances at the Playhouse Theatre.

In the early 1960s Marriott had several guest performances on television shows including The Defenders, Route 66, and The Patty Duke Show. In 1963 he was cast in a primary role in Robert Thom's Bicycle Ride to Nevada, which opened the season at the Shubert Theatre in New Haven, Connecticut in September, prior to premiering on Broadway at the Cort Theatre on September 24. The play was not well received by the critics, and closed after a single performance. His next project was a prominent role in The Resistible Rise of Arturo Ui, which opened on November 11, 1963 at the Lunt-Fontanne Theatre, after a week of previews. While this Broadway premiere was not a commercial success, the Bertolt Brecht play is considered a classical theater satire. Marriott's film contribution in 1963 fared better, as he played the role of Hurst in the critically acclaimed, The Cool World. During the decade he would continue to perform in regional theater, such as You Can't Take It with You in 1966 at the Corning Summer Theatre. The following year he appeared in Eugene O'Neill's More Stately Mansions, which opened at the Broadhurst Theatre on Halloween (October 31) 1967, and ran for 142 performances. The play starred Ingrid Bergman, Colleen Dewhurst, and Arthur Hill. After Mansions closed on March 2, 1968, Marriott appeared in the very next production at the Broadhurst, as Roger in the Gore Vidal political comedy, Weekend, which opened on March 13. The play was not well received and closed after only 21 performances.

Marriott appeared in several films during the early 1970s, his final appearance on the big screen was as the asthmatic bank security guard, Howard, in 1975's Dog Day Afternoon, starring Al Pacino. Marriott's final performance was on stage, as Ramsey Eyes in The Last Meeting of the Knights of the White Magnolia in 1976, also performed at the Broadhurst.

== Filmography ==
Year	Title	Role	Notes
1941	The Little Foxes	Cal	
1953	The Joe Louis Story	Sam Langford	
1963	The Cool World	Hurst	
1964	Black Like Me	Hodges	
1972	Dear Dead Delilah	Marshall	
1972	Corky	Junkman	
1973	Badge 373	Superintendent	
1975	Dog Day Afternoon	Howard	(final film role)
