= With These Hands (film) =

1950 film

- Directed by: Jack Arnold
- Written by: Morton Wishengrad
- Produced by: Jack Arnold; Lee Goodman
- Starring: Sam Levene
- Cinematography: Gerald Hirschfeld
- Edited by: Charles R. Senf
- Production company: Promotional Films Co. for the International Ladies Garment Workers Union
- Release date: June 15, 1950
- Running time: 52 minutes
- Country: United States
- Language: English

With These Hands is a 1950 documentary film presented in flashbacks directed by Jack Arnold and starring Sam Levene as Alexander Brody; originally created for showing to members of the International Ladies Garment Workers Union, the film opened June 15, 1950 at the 1,100-seat Gotham Theatre. The film was nominated for an Academy Award for Best Documentary Feature.

The film recreates the Triangle Shirtwaist Factory fire and compares working conditions of the 1910s with the 1950s.

== Cast ==
- Sam Levene as Alexander Brody
- Arlene Francis as Jenny
- Joseph Wiseman as Deleo
- Louis Sorin as Boss
- Alexander Scourby as Doctor
- Rudy Bond as Business agent
- Alexander Lockwood as Doctor (in 1913)
- Haskell Coffin as Impartial chairman
- Julius Bing as Triangle boss
- Morris Strassberg as Bagel and Lox
- Rolly Bester as Typist
- Gail Gregg as Girl in fire
- Judy Walther as Tess
