= Michael Plant =

Australian screenwriter

Michael Plant (1930–1965) was an Australian screenwriter, actor and producer best known for co-creating Whiplash.

The Bulletin said on his death in 1965 that Plant "had left as big an impression on Australian viewing habits as any one man in the industry's brief history."

== Biography ==
Plant, the son of Major-General Eric Plant, was educated in Canberra and at The Scots College, Sydney. Plant started writing and producing radio plays while still at high school. According to one obituary, "At 15, and still in short pants, Michael Plant presented himself at the office of a Sydney radio producer, insisting that he wanted to be a scriptwriter. He was given a script outline to work on and returned the next morning with a story which is still remembered as "brilliant". He worked for Grace Gibson as a writer, actor and producer then moved to London. A play he co-wrote Miss Isobel was performed on Broadway. He wrote for several American television series before returning to Australia in 1964.

His final job was as executive producer over 28 episodes of the Mavis Bramston Show. Barry Creyton recalled, "He had a wicked sense of humour and understood precisely the nature of topical and political satire. ATN kept a bunch of lawyers vetting everything we did for libel and slander, but Michael always managed to stay one step ahead of the threatened lawsuits, always with stinging wit. He was a great talent."

== Death ==
He died age 33. Police were told that he had been working up to 80 hours a week on the production of the show, and that there were no suspicious circumstances to his death.

== TV select credits ==
- The Veil (1958) – writer episode "Jack the Ripper"
- One Step Beyond (1959) – writer
- Men into Space (1959–60) – writer
- Bourbon Street Beat (1960) – episode "Find My Face"
- The Detectives (1960) – episode "Floating Face Down"
- The Barbara Stanwyck Show (1961) – episode "High Tension" – story
- Whiplash (1960–61) – co creator, story editor, writer
- Jonah (1963) – story editor, writer
- The Mavis Bramston Show (1965) – producer

== Other writing ==
- Rube Knew All About Art (1949) – winner ABC radio short story competition
- They Lied to Henry Wilson (1950) – radio producer
- Miss Isobel (1957) – play

== As actor ==
- Dear Charles (1955) theatre
