= Jackie McKeever =

American actress

- Born: Jacquelyn L. McKeever; November 19, 1930
- Died: June 27, 2007 (aged 76)
- Education: Susquehanna University
- Occupation: Actress/Singer
- Years active: 1953–1960

Jacquelyn McKeever (November 19, 1930 – June 27, 2007) was an American actress and singer.

== Early years ==
Born Jacquelyn L. McKeever in Bethlehem, Pennsylvania to Rollin McKeever and Arlene McKeever. McKeever grew up in the neighboring town of Catasauqua, Pennsylvania. She graduated from Whitehall High School and attended Susquehanna University in Selinsgrove, Pennsylvania. McKeever was a music major at Susquehanna and while there was involved in Sigma Alpha Iota, a music fraternity for women.

She was also involved in piano, chapel choir, Susquehanna Singers and the Symphony Orchestra. She graduated from Susquehanna in 1953.

McKeever started teaching music after college, including a stint teaching Music Appreciation at a grade school in Livingston, New Jersey. She later said she only took the teaching job to get her closer to New York City so she could study piano there.

McKeever was discovered while teaching in Livingston when she joined the choir of a local church when a music director heard her sing. The director asked her to do a summer vocal workshop. She wasn't sure if she was interested in a singing career but she decided to do the workshop and subsequently was invited to perform in a series of operatic roles at the Paper Mill Playhouse in Millburn, New Jersey. She then decided to leave her teaching career and pursue a full-time career on Broadway. Her boyfriend around this time proposed to her, but she turned him down to focus on her career.

In the spring of 1956, McKeever improved her career opportunities by appearing on the television program Chance of a Lifetime. She won the talent contest in three episodes before losing.

== Theatre ==
McKeever continued to take class and worked on her acting chops by performing in summer stock in New York. She was cast in the musical A Carefree Heart that never made it to Broadway. Also in that show was veteran performer Susan Johnson, who helped McKeever get a part in a new musical based on the 1953 film The Captain's Paradise. McKeever said, " José Ferrer, the director, picked me for the part because he said I had an innocent look. ....I don't know about that, though." The musical was Oh, Captain!, starring Tony Randall as the Captain, and in which McKeever made her Broadway debut. The show opened at the Neil Simon Theatre in February 1958 and played 192 performances. McKeever played the part that in the film was portrayed by Celia Johnson. She had to learn an English accent, which she said she did by watching movies. The producers also made her lose weight for the role. Critics praised her performance as a proper English wife who kicks up her heels on a trip to Paris. For this role, McKeever received a Tony Award nomination (her co-stars, Susan Johnson and Tony Randall, were also nominated and the show received a nomination for Best Musical). Johnson and McKeever were nominated for Best Featured Actress in a Musical together but lost to Barbara Cook for The Music Man. In 1964 she was the female lead in the first Australian production of the musical Camelot alongside Paul Daneman which opened at Her Majesty's Theatre, Melbourne.

== Television ==
McKeever is most known for starring in a 1958 television adaptation of the musical Wonderful Town (1953) opposite Rosalind Russell. McKeever took the role of Eileen Sherwood in the television version. During the 1950s McKeever also guest-starred on Bronco and was a featured singer on The Ed Sullivan Show.

== Death ==
McKeever died on June 27, 2007, at the age of 76 of natural causes. She had retired from show business and was a resident of Mifflinburg, Pennsylvania, and her hometown of Catasauqua, Pennsylvania.
