= Glorifying the American Girl =

1929 film

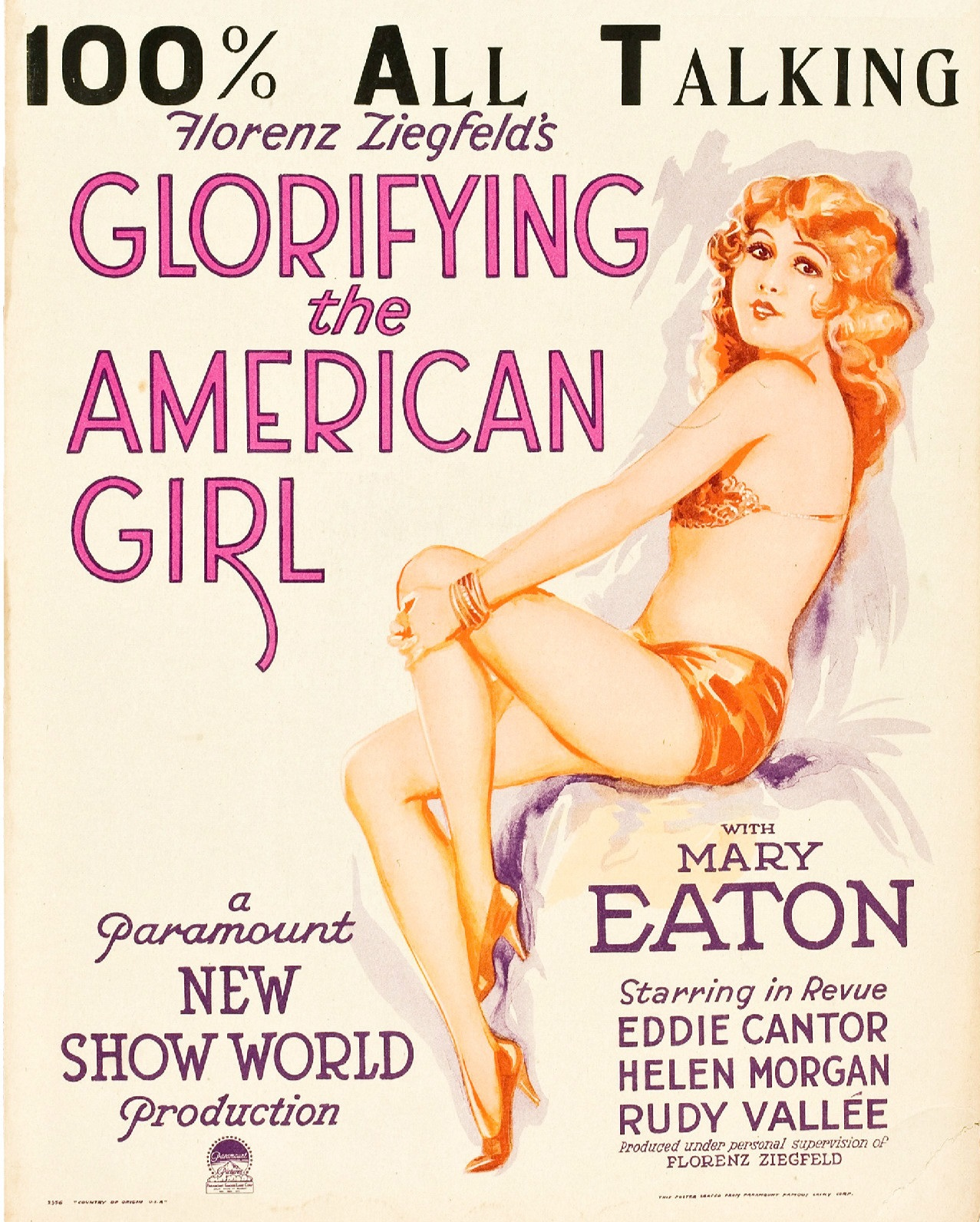
- Directed by: John W. Harkrider; Millard Webb
- Written by: J.P. McEvoy (story); Millard Webb
- Produced by: Florenz Ziegfeld
- Starring: Mary Eaton; Dan Healy
- Cinematography: George J. Folsey (Technicolor)
- Music by: Irving Berlin; Walter Donaldson; Rudolf Friml; James E. Hanley
- Distributed by: Paramount Pictures
- Release date: December 7, 1929
- Running time: 96 minutes
- Country: United States
- Language: English

The full film

Glorifying the American Girl is a 1929 American pre-Code musical comedy film produced by Florenz Ziegfeld that highlights Ziegfeld Follies performers. The last third of the film, which was filmed in early Technicolor, is basically a Follies production, with appearances by Rudy Vallee, Helen Morgan, and Eddie Cantor.

Rex Beach was paid $35,000 for the original story.

The script for the film was written by J.P. McEvoy and Millard Webb and directed by John W. Harkrider and Millard Webb. The songs were written by Irving Berlin, Walter Donaldson, Rudolf Friml, James E. Hanley, Larry Spier, Dave Stamper and others not credited (see Soundtrack). The film is in the public domain, and many prints exhibited on television are in black-and-white only, and do not include pre-Code material, such as nudity.

== Plot ==
The plot involves a young woman, Gloria Hughes, who wants to be in the Follies, but in the meantime is making ends meet by working at a department store's sheet music department, where she sings the latest hits. She is accompanied on piano by her childhood boyfriend Buddy, who is in love with her, despite her single-minded interest in her career. When a vaudeville performer, Danny Miller, asks her to join him as his new partner, she sees it as an opportunity to make her dream come true. Upon arriving in New York City, our heroine finds out that her new partner is only interested in sleeping with her and makes this a condition of making her a star. Soon, however, she is discovered by a representative of Ziegfeld. Though she loses Buddy to Barbara, another girl he met while Gloria traveled to New York, and who was injured for a time by a car running her over when Buddy went off with Gloria, Gloria eventually triumphs on stage.

== Cast ==
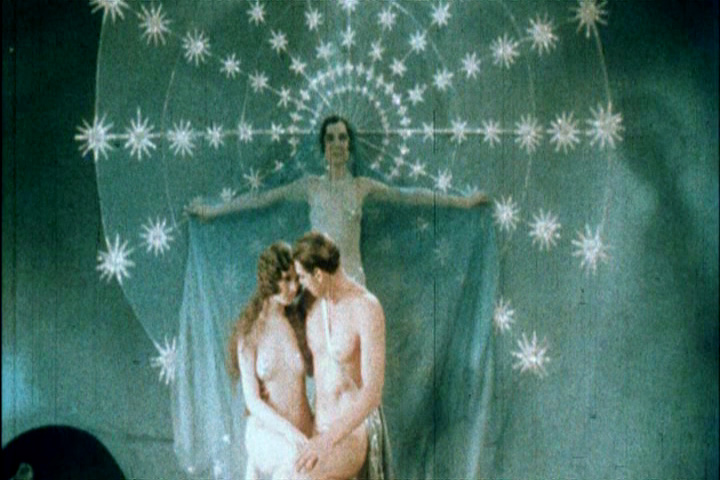
Johnny Weissmuller with an unidentified actress

- Mary Eaton as Gloria Hughes
- Dan Healy as Danny Miller
- Kaye Renard as Mooney
- Edward Crandall as Buddy Moore
- Gloria Shea as Barbara (billed as Olive Shea)
- Sarah Edwards as Mrs. Hughes
- Lou Hearn as tailor shop customer

=== Cameo appearances ===
- Noah Beery
- Irving Berlin
- Norman Brokenshire
- Billie Burke
- Eddie Cantor
- Desha Delteil
- Charles B. Dillingham
- Texas Guinan
- Otto Kahn
- Nancy Kelly
- Ring Lardner
- Bull Montana
- Helen Morgan
- Tony Sansone
- Louis Sorin
- Rudy Vallee
- Jimmy Walker
- Johnny Weissmuller
- Joseph Urban
- Florenz Ziegfeld Jr.
- Adolph Zukor

== Production ==
This Pre-Code movie is notable for being the one of the first talkies to use the word "damn"; the word is used twice by Sarah Edwards as well as multiple times in the skit involving Eddie Cantor, Louis Sorin and Lew Hearn. Credit for being the first talkie to use the word is often erroneously given to either 1938's Pygmalion or 1939's Gone with the Wind, but the word "damn" was used twice in the film Coquette, released in April 1929 (several months before Glorifying the American Girl).

The revue sequence contains virtual nudity and revealing costumes. Both Paramount and EMKA failed to renew the copyright and the film is now in the public domain. EMKA's successor, Universal Studios, continues to hold the original film elements; though technically the EMKA library is part of NBC Universal Television, successor to Universal Television and MCA Television (EMKA was a subsidiary of MCA). The movie contains brief shots of Noah Beery, Irving Berlin, Billie Burke, Charles B. Dillingham, Texas Guinan, Otto Kahn, Ring Lardner, and Mayor of New York City Jimmy Walker as themselves, taken from newsreels and other productions. There is an uncredited, non-speaking scene with Johnny Weissmuller wearing nothing but a fig leaf. The greater part of the final half of the film is a revue given over to a re-creation of a Follies production, replete with musical solos by Rudy Vallee and Helen Morgan and a comedy sketch with Eddie Cantor and Louis Sorin as a pair of Jewish tailors.

== Preservation ==
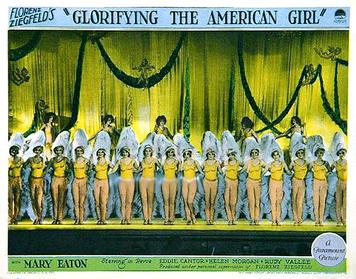
Poster for the film.

The black-and-white prints currently shown on television, with a cut-down running time of 87 minutes, were made in the 1950s and have a number of sequences cut due to their Pre-Code content, i.e. nudity, etc. The film was restored, to the length of 96 minutes, with the original Technicolor sequences, by the UCLA Film and Television Archive. Glorifying The American Girl was released on DVD and blu-ray by Kino Lorber on December 3, 2019. This version is taken from the UCLA restoration and includes the complete film including the Technicolor sequences.

== Reception ==
The film was a box office flop, with low-quality sound technology and low-value stars, and with little success among retrospective critics.

== Soundtrack ==
The film begins with a medley of hits from Ziegfeld productions, including "Tulip Time", "A Pretty Girl Is Like a Melody", "Sally, Won't You Come Back?", and "No Foolin'." The band at the picnic plays "Bye Bye Blackbird" and "Side by Side."

- "No Foolin'"

Music by Rudolf Friml and James F. Hanley
Lyrics by Gene Buck and Irving Caesar
Sung by Mary Eaton

- "Baby Face"

Music by Harry Akst
Lyrics by Benny Davis
Sung by Mary Eaton

- "I'll Be There"

Music by Larry Spier, J. Fred Coots, and Lou Davis
Sung by Mary Eaton and played on the piano several times by Edward Crandall

- "Spooning with the One You Love"

Performed by Dan Healy and Kaye Renard

- "Blue Skies"

Music by Irving Berlin
Played by a band while the acrobats are performing

- "Sam, the Old Accordion Man"

Music by Walter Donaldson
Danced to by Dan Healy and Mary Eaton at the picnic and later onstage

- "Hot Feet"

Music by Jimmy McHugh
Danced to by Dan Healy and Mary Eaton

- "I'm Just a Vagabond Lover"

Music by Rudy Vallée and Leon Zimmerman
Performed by Rudy Vallée and His Connecticut Yankees

- "What Wouldn't I Do for That Man?"

Music by Jay Gorney
Lyrics by E.Y. Harburg
Performed by Helen Morgan

- "There Must Be Somebody Waiting For Me"

Music by Walter Donaldson
Performed by Mary Eaton and chorus in the finale. Played by pianist while Eaton dances en pointe. Played during opening credits.

== See also ==
- List of films in the public domain in the United States
- List of early color feature films
- List of early sound feature films (1926–1929)
- Nudity in film
