= Four Sons (1940 film) =

1940 film by Archie Mayo

- Directed by: Archie Mayo
- Written by: John Howard Lawson; Milton Sperling (add. dialogue)
- Based on: "Grandmother Bernle Learns Her Letters" by I. A. R. Wylie
- Produced by: Darryl F. Zanuck
- Starring: Don Ameche; Eugenie Leontovich
- Cinematography: Leon Shamroy
- Production company: Twentieth Century-Fox
- Distributed by: Twentieth Century-Fox
- Release date: June 14, 1940
- Running time: 89 minutes
- Country: United States
- Language: English

Four Sons is a 1940 war film directed by Archie Mayo. It stars Don Ameche and Eugenie Leontovich. It is a remake of the 1928 film of the same name.

The film follows the lives of four Czecho-German brothers following the German occupation of Czechoslovakia. Two of them choose to serve Nazi Germany, another chooses to fight in support of the Czech lands, and the fourth emigrates to the United States.

== Plot ==
When the Germans invade Czechoslovakia in 1939, the four sons of a Czecho-German family follow different paths: Czech patriot, Nazi supporter, artist in America, and heroic German soldier.

== Cast ==
- Don Ameche as Chris Bern
- Eugenie Leontovich as Frau Bern
- Mary Beth Hughes as Anna
- Alan Curtis as Karl Bern
- George Ernest as Fritz Bern
- Robert Lowery as Joseph
- Lionel Royce as Max Sturm
- Sig Ruman as Newmann (as Sig Rumann)
- Ludwig Stössel as Pastor
- Christian Rub as Kapek
- Torben Meyer as Gustav
