= The Bear Dances =

- Written by: F. L. Lucas
- Genre: political drama

Premiere
- Date: 31 October 1932
- Place: Garrick Theatre

The Bear Dances: A Play in Three Acts is a political drama about the Soviet Union set in 1930, written by British playwright F. L. Lucas in 1931, and first staged in 1932. It was his first play; he went on to write five more.

== Characters (and actors in first production) ==
- Grigori Stepanovitch Orlov — Maurice Browne
- Andrey Grigorovitch Orlov — Henry Hewitt
- Elizaveta Leontievna Orlov — Olga Lindo
- Leonti Levine — Abraham Sofaer
- Vera Levine — Elena Miramova
- Father Anton Kirillitch — Henry Vibart
- Vladimir Blok — Gyles Isham
- Fydor Ivanov — Frederic Sargent
- Domna Vassilievna Ivanova — Dorothy Edwards
- Police, travellers, vendors, workers, etc.

== Plot summary ==
Moscow, Spring 1930. Two OGPU officers search the room of Father Anton Kirillitch, who has been banned from his church and ordered to stop preaching. He shares the room with Grigori Orlov, ejected from his chair at the university for a "reactionary" refusal to give a Marxist slant to his literature lectures. Both live in poverty, in half a room of Grigori's former house, now seized by the State. To visit Grigori come his son, Andrey, and his son's wife, Elizaveta, both 35, who eloped to England in 1914 and are now naturalised British. Andrey, a left-wing writer in London, is horrified by his father's treatment and by the workings of the Soviet régime. Elizaveta, a doctor in London, has tried the West and found it wanting. She is more open-minded about the USSR, and finds a non-sentimental attraction in the work to be done. Their marriage is in trouble: she no longer loves Andrey. Vera Levine, 19, Elizaveta's sister whom she last saw before the War, arrives, an "agricultural expert" full of youthful enthusiasm for the New Russia, along with Leonti Levine, their father, a former antiques-dealer now Inspector of Collective Farms in northern Ukraine. With the Levines is Vladimir Blok, 30, an OGPU official and Revolutionary Judge. Vera suggests that the returned émigrés visit "her" collective farm in Ukraine. Vladimir gives permission (Orlov son might perhaps be pressured to write positively about the USSR when he returns to London) and allows Grigori to accompany them. Act One closes with the arrest by the OGPU of Father Anton, who knows this means the Lubyanka and liquidation.

Act Two takes place three days later at a railway station in western Russia, where the travelling party are waiting for a connection. Behind the political arguments, Elizaveta and Vladimir are sexually attracted; Andrey and Vera are falling in love. Leonti loathes Grigori from pre-Revolution days (they quarrelled over their children's elopement). When Leonti briefly leaves his luggage unattended, Grigori glances at Levine's pocket-book, finds something compromising inside, darts to the cloakroom to make a copy, then returns the book to the frantic Leonti, who thought it had been stolen.

On the collective farm in Act Three, in the Soviet House, Vera is in her element and full of pride. We witness a workers' wedding where the Soviet girls dance with spirit. Elizaveta tells Andrey their marriage is over: she has chosen Vladimir and will stay on in the USSR. The atmosphere darkens with a series of peremptory trials presided over by Vladimir: crimes against the individual are punished leniently, crimes against property (and therefore the State) with terrible vengeance. When some peasants are accused of being kulaks and sentenced to the Gulag for "hoarding" small quantities of grain, Andrey, watching, can take no more. He snatches Blok's pistol and shoots him dead. He is seized and knows he will be executed. Grigori, to save his son, tells Elizaveta what he found in her father's pocket-book: Leonti has been smuggling goods across the nearby Polish frontier (an "anti-Soviet" activity). Elizaveta, he insists, must blackmail her father with the threat of telling the fanatical Vera, to smuggle Andrey across the frontier. Andrey, however, will only attempt the escape if his father comes too. Elizaveta confronts Levine, who, terrified of Vera, caves in. The telephone line is cut. After delivering Vladimir's funeral oration offstage (which we hear), a tearful Vera enters to say goodbye to Andrey before he is carried off to Kiev. After a minute or two, she realises that the muffled figure in the dark room she has been addressing is not Andrey, but Elizaveta. The Orlovs have escaped. Elizaveta hints at what has happened; we guess Levine will not return. Vera raises the alarm – in vain. The play ends with Elizaveta attempting to console her weeping sister.

== Productions and publication ==
The Bear Dances was premiered by the People's Theatre, Newcastle upon Tyne in 1932. The first dramatisation of the Soviets on London's West-end stage, it was directed later that year at the Garrick by Leon M. Lion, with designs and décor by Robert Lutyens. The first night in London was attended by some serving members of the British Cabinet, among them Walter Runciman, by prominent MPs, and by various ambassadors to the UK. (Note: Among politicians present on the first night was Sir Austen Chamberlain. Aware that in Act 2 he was to be guyed in effigy in frock coat, top hat and monocle, he arrived at the Garrick wearing frock coat, top hat and monocle. A photograph of the event appeared in The Tatler. ('First-Nighters at Drury Lane and the Garrick', The Tatler, vol.126, no. 1637, 9 November 1932, p.240 )) The play ran from 31 October to 5 November 1932 (only eight performances), closing early. It was, however, with cuts, revived with more success by various repertory theatres in the North of England in the later 1930s, including the Manchester Repertory, with Katherine Hynes in the leading role. The text was published in May 1933 by Cassell and Company of London. To it was added a long Introduction, 'The Gospel According to St Marx', in which Lucas discussed the shortcomings of Soviet Communism and defended his play against the reviewers' criticism. The original manuscript of the play is in the Leon M. Lion Collection, River Campus Libraries, University of Rochester, USA.

== Political background ==
Adulation of the Soviet Union has been described as "the fashionable trahison des clercs" of the interwar years. The Bear Dances was an attempt at ideological disinfectant, written at the start of a decade in which Cambridge University (in Lucas's words) "grew full of very green young men going very Red". Though Lucas strives for objectivity (the play was vetted by an ex-member of the British Embassy in Moscow), with Vera and Vladimir acting as spokesmen for the new order, his verdict on the Soviet system is damning. Fear, inhumanity, injustice abound. The play's title suggests captivity, pain and submission. "The intolerable thing about Moscow," wrote Lucas, "is not that it is Communist; it is that it is not Communist. Genuine Communism, while one might disagree with it, one could respect. But this pseudo-Communism of the Kremlin is perhaps the most gigantic sham in history. It has waded through seas of blood – for what? That a régime where the rich were powerful might be replaced by a régime where the powerful are rich."

== Reception ==
Despite approval of its subject-matter ("Any study of conditions in Soviet Russia is certain at the moment to command attention," noted The Spectator) and praise for the directing, acting, and designs, the reviewers found The Bear Dances "overladen with pamphleteering argument, on both sides". "The play's weakness lies in its tendency to repeated pleading," observed Ivor Brown in The Week-end Review. "Heavy blue pencilling would have given this play a chance of life," agreed John Pollock in The Saturday Review. The Stage conceded that the trial scene, the fatal firing, the bargaining with Levine, and the escape "were all more or less interesting and effective", as did Harold Hobson in one of his earliest play-reviews. Henri Barbusse in The Daily Worker, however, condemned the playwright for peddling "slanderous caricatures" of the Soviet Union. ("Too unnerving," was Lucas's comment on this.) Komisarjevsky, calling it the only authentic play on the USSR by an Englishman that he had seen, told Lucas that he would have liked to have produced it himself.

== Later writing on Russia and the Soviets ==
Lucas returned to the subject of the Soviet Union in a two-part essay, 'A Week of Berlin', published in the Manchester Guardian in October 1948 and enlarged in The Greatest Problem, and Other Essays (1960), about his visit to Berlin as British Council lecturer during the Blockade. Here he recalled his dismay at being shown at Bletchley Park, months before the fall of Berlin in 1945, a confidential map of the areas of Germany that Roosevelt had agreed to leave in Russian hands. "Thinking men and women were feeling passionately," he wrote of Berliners in 1948, "that Berlin had become for Europe what Verdun once was for France... Berlin, as they saw it, was not only a breakwater for the West; it was also a beacon for the East. With its surrender a still deeper gloom would fall on decent men in all the other lands in the Valley of the Shadow of the Kremlin. Time could no longer be gained by selling space – only by holding it. Bargains with Moscow were useless. Reasoning with Moscow was useless. One must hold."
