= The Barbara Stanwyck Show =

- Genre: Anthology drama
- Written by: various including Michael Plant
- Directed by: Lewis Allen; Robert Florey; Arthur Hiller; Don Medford; David Lowell Rich; Stuart Rosenberg; Don Taylor; Jacques Tourneur; Richard Whorf
- Presented by: Barbara Stanwyck
- Theme music composer: Earle Hagen
- Country of origin: United States
- Original language: English
- No. of seasons: 1
- No. of episodes: 37

Production
- Executive producer: Louis F. Edelman
- Producer: William H. Wright
- Running time: 30 mins.
- Production company: ESW Productions

Original release
- Network: NBC
- Release: September 19, 1960 – September 11, 1961

The Barbara Stanwyck Show is an American anthology drama television series that aired on NBC from September 19, 1960, to September 11, 1961. Barbara Stanwyck served as hostess, and starred in all but four of the half-hour productions. The four in which she did not star were actually pilot episodes of potential series programs which never materialized. Stanwyck won the Emmy Award in 1961 for Outstanding Performance by an Actress in a Series.

Three of the episodes in which Stanwyck starred were attempts to spin off her own dramatic series as "Josephine Little", an American woman running an import-export shop in Hong Kong.

The Barbara Stanwyck Show was produced at Desilu Studios and used several different directors, including Robert Florey, Jacques Tourneur, Stuart Rosenberg. The anthology lasted one season. It aired at 10 p.m. Eastern on Mondays opposite Jackie Cooper's military sitcom Hennesey on CBS and the second half of Gardner McKay's Adventures in Paradise on ABC.

The American Gas Association sponsored the program on alternate weeks.

== Guest stars ==
- Leon Ames
- Dana Andrews
- Michael Ansara
- Lew Ayres
- Ralph Bellamy
- Milton Berle
- James Best
- Charles Bickford
- Joan Blondell
- Nesdon Booth
- Edgar Buchanan
- Spencer Chan
- James Chandler
- Joseph Cotten
- Walter Coy
- Yvonne Craig
- Hume Cronyn
- Robert Culp
- Andy Devine
- Dan Duryea
- Richard Eastham
- Buddy Ebsen
- Elana Eden
- Ross Elliott
- Peter Falk
- William Fawcett
- Eduard Franz
- Bruce Gordon
- Virginia Gregg
- Eloise Hardt
- Dennis Hopper
- Robert Horton
- Julie London
- John McGiver
- Stephen McNally
- Lee Marvin
- Gerald Mohr
- Vic Morrow
- Jack Mullaney
- Jack Nicholson
- Lloyd Nolan
- Susan Oliver
- Doris Packer
- James Philbrook
- Amanda Randolph
- Michael Rennie
- Marion Ross
- Penny Santon
- Harold J. Stone
- Gerald Oliver Smith
- Stephen Talbot
- Virginia Vincent
- Anna May Wong

== Production ==
11 episodes, The Mink Coat, Ironbark's Bridge, The Miraculous Journey of Tadpole Chan, Frightened Doll, The Choice, Sign of the Zodiac, Adventure on Happiness Street, The Golden Acres, Confession, Dragon by the Tail, Dear Charlie have been directed by Jacques Tourneur.

== Home media ==
E1 Entertainment, formerly known as Koch Vision, and The Archive of American Television released Volume 1 of the series on DVD in the United States on October 13, 2009. A second volume also a two-disc set was released on May 18, 2010.
