= Nickolas Muray =

Hungarian-born American photographer and Olympic saber fencer

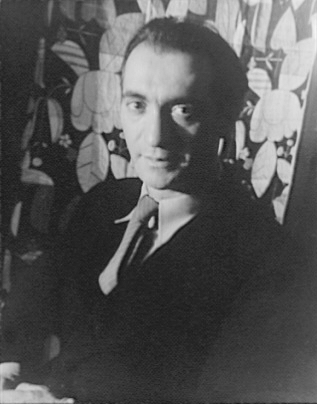
- Nickolas Muray, 1933

Personal information
- Full name: Miklós Mandl
- Born: 15 February 1892 Szeged, Hungary
- Died: 2 November 1965 (aged 73) New York City

Fencing career
- Sport: Fencing
- Country: United States
- Weapon: Saber
- Club: New York Athletic Club, the Washington Square Fencing Club, the Fencers Club, and Salle Santelli

Nickolas Muray (born Miklós Mandl; 15 February 1892 – 2 November 1965) was a Hungarian-born American photographer and Olympic saber fencer.

== Early and personal life ==
Muray was born in Szeged, Hungary to a well-to-do Hungarian-Jewish family. His father Samu Mandl was a postal worker, and his mother Klara Lovit was a homemaker. In 1894 his family moved to Budapest. He attended a graphic arts school in Budapest, where he studied lithography, photoengraving, and photography. After earning an International Engraver's Certificate, Muray took a three-year course in color photoengraving in Berlin, where, among other things, he learned to make color filters. At the end of his course he went to work for the publishing company Ullstein-Verlag.

His first wife was Hungarian literary figure Ilona Fulop, but they divorced. He then married Leja Gorska in 1921, but they also divorced. Muray in June 1930 married Monica O’Shea, who was in the advertising business, and they ultimately divorced. On 23 July 1942, he married his last wife, Margaret Schwab. He had a decade-long, passionate love affair and lasting friendship with artist Frida Kahlo. Kahlo, known for several male & female lovers, said that only Muray rivaled Diego for Frida's deepest affection. Although, she chose a second-round at marriage with Rivera, her personal love and respect of Muray, lasted far longer than her passion for Rivera. Muray & Kahlo maintained deeply intimate correspondence for years after their affair, right up until days before her death.

== Photography career ==
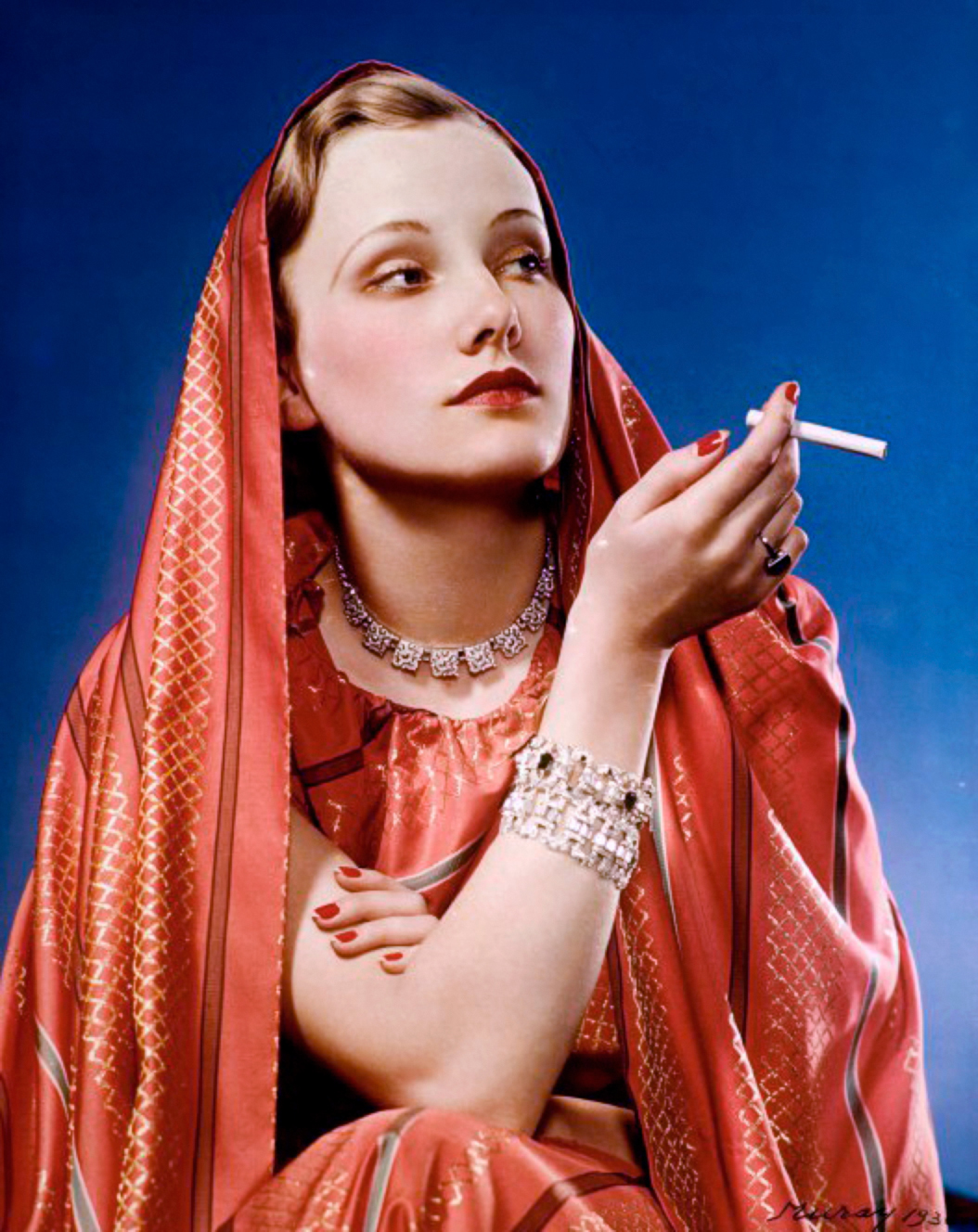
Girl in Red, 1936 advertising photo for Lucky Strike cigarettes

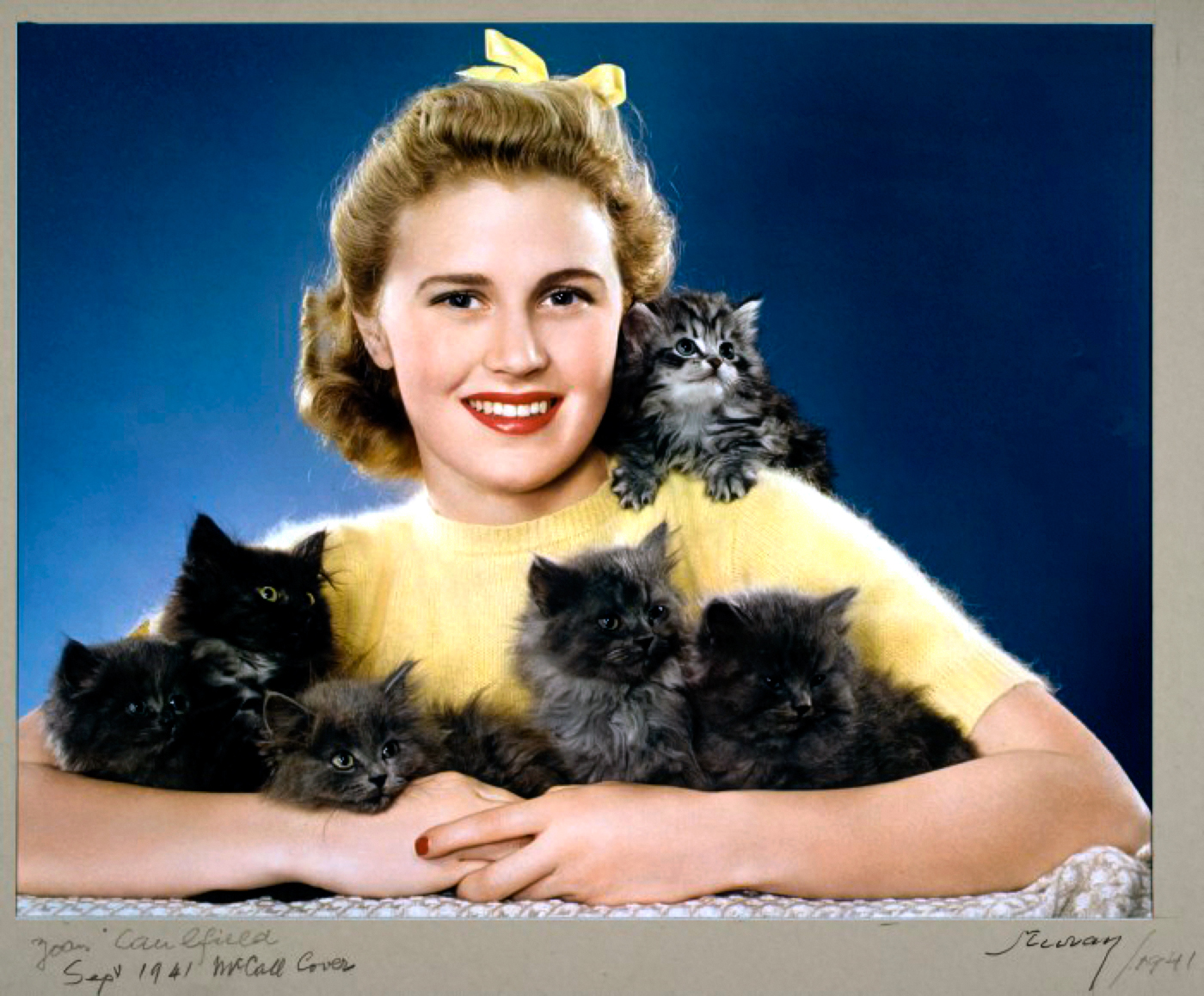
Cover photo of Joan Caulfield for McCall's Magazine, 1941

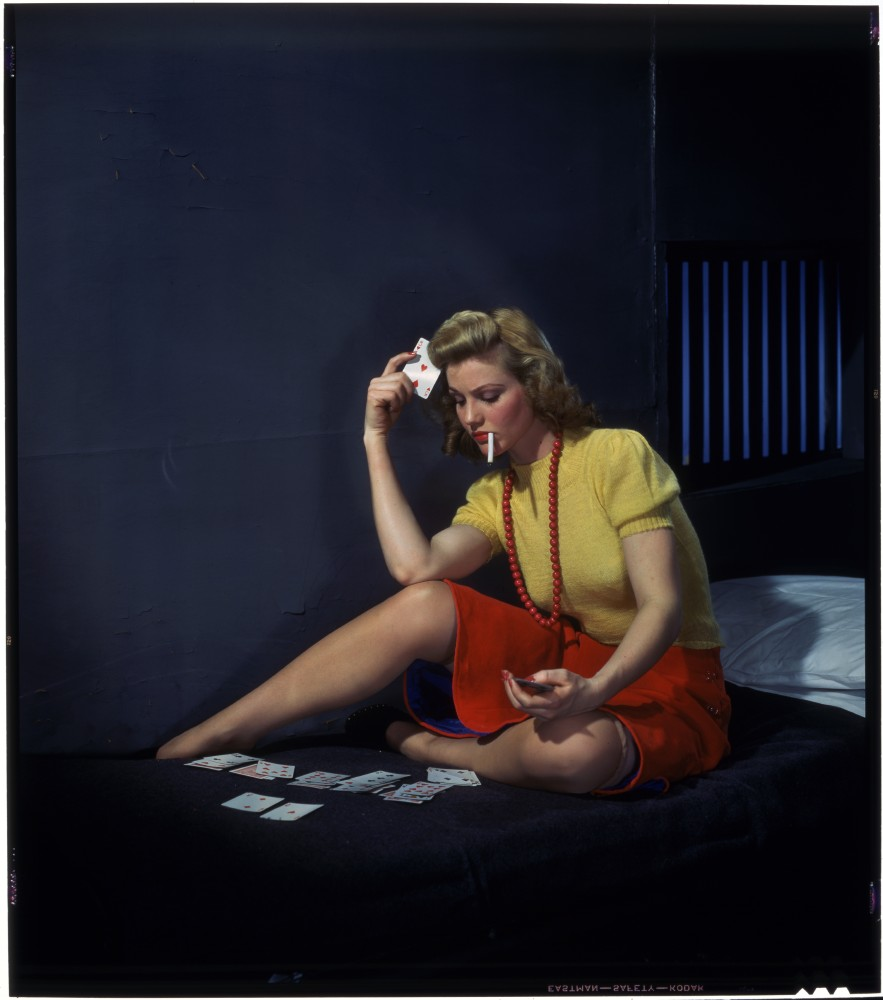
Woman in cell, playing solitaire, ca. 1950

In 1913 Muray sailed to New York City, and was able to find work as a color printer in Brooklyn.

By 1920, Muray had opened a portrait studio at his home in Greenwich Village, while still working at his union job as an engraver. In 1921 he received a commission from Harper's Bazaar to do a portrait of the Broadway actress Florence Reed; soon after he was having photographs published each month in Harper's Bazaar, and was able to give up his engraving job. In 1922 he also made a portrait of the dancer Desha Delteil.

Muray quickly became recognized as an important portrait photographer, and his subjects included most of the celebrities of New York City. In 1926, Vanity Fair sent Muray to London, Paris, and Berlin to photograph celebrities, and in 1929 hired him to photograph movie stars in Hollywood. He also did fashion and advertising work. Muray's images were published in many other publications, including Vogue, Ladies' Home Journal, and The New York Times.

Between 1920 and 1940, Muray made over 10,000 portraits. His 1938 portrait of Frida Kahlo, made while Kahlo sojourned in New York, attending her exhibit at the Julien Levy Gallery, became the best known and loved portrait made by Muray. Muray and Kahlo were at the height of a ten-year love affair in 1939 when the portrait was made. Their affair had started in 1931, after Muray was divorced from his second wife and shortly after Kahlo's marriage to Mexican muralist painter Diego Rivera. It outlived Muray's third marriage and Kahlo's divorce and remarriage to Rivera by one year, ending in 1941. Muray wanted to marry, but when it became apparent that Kahlo wanted Muray as a lover, not a husband, Muray took his leave for good and married his fourth wife, Peggy (Margaret) Muray. He and Kahlo remained good friends until her death, in 1954.

After the market crash in 1929, Muray turned away from celebrity and theatrical portraiture, and become a pioneering commercial photographer, famous for his creation of many of the conventions of color advertising. He was considered the master of the three-color carbro process. His last important public portraits were of Dwight David Eisenhower in the 1950s.

During World War II, he taught photography at New York University.

Muray's magazine and fashion pictures from the 1930s and 1940s are regarded as fine examples of color photography and what the International Center for Photography called "the postwar American advertising aesthetic of excess." Muray fused technical mastery with a lively wit to produce portraits of refined elegance and subtle insight, alongside vibrant, boldly commercial images that captured the spirit of his time.

== Fencing career ==
Muray competed for the United States at the 1928 and 1932 Summer Olympics (when he came in fourth in sabre team) in the sabre fencing events. He won the US Team Saber National Championship in 1927 and 1928, and the National Saber Championship in 1929. In 1935 and 1936 he won the National Foil Team Championship. He won the Metropolitan Saber Fencing Championship in 1934, 1942, 1950, and 1951. In addition to the NYAC, he fenced for the Washington Square Fencing Club, the Fencers Club, and Salle Santelli, representing each one during his career.

Muray represented the New York Athletic Club and was a lifelong fencer for the club. He suffered a heart attack on 9 February 1961, four years prior to his death while fencing at the club, and was saved through the efforts of a fellow fencer and physician Dr. Barry Pariser who performed heart massage. On the second occasion in the very same fencing room Muray was struck again in a final and fatal attack on 2 November 1965. There is a plaque in his honor on display at the fencing room dedicated to his memory. In his lifetime he had won over 60 fencing medals.

== See also ==
- List of select Jewish fencers
- List of USFA Division I National Champions
- List of USFA Hall of Fame members
