= Desha Delteil =

Dancer and model, 1899-1980

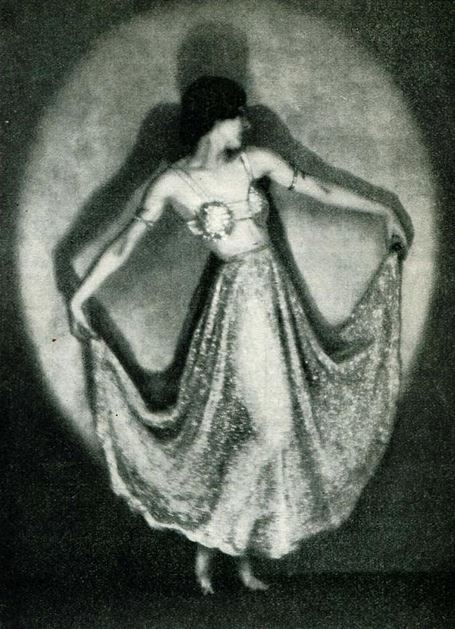
Desha with the Fokine Ballet

Desha Delteil (March 18, 1899 – July 17, 1980) was a Slovenia-born dancer and artists' model.

== Biography ==
She was born Desha Eva Podgoršek in Ljubljana, Austria-Hungary (present-day Ljubljana, Slovenia), emigrated to the US with her sister Leja in 1913 and studied under Michel Fokine, eventually becoming first dancer in his company. In 1920 she appeared in a solo short movie, The Bubble, which was about a young girl dancing with a balloon, and was an uncredited cabaret dancer in the 1924 motion picture Isn't Life Wonderful. A few years later, her "bubble dance" in the 1929 Hollywood musical Glorifying the American Girl made her well known.

In 1916, she was hired to pose for sculptor Harriet Whitney Frishmuth and modeled for several of Frishmuth's female bronzes, one of which Frishmuth entitled Desha. She became Frishmuth's favorite model, posing not only for a number of her best pieces but also for her studio art classes. She is known to have posed for The Vine and Roses of Yesterday, and is presumed to have posed for The Hunt based on similarities of form and figure. Delteil modeled for other artists as well, being highly valued for her ability to hold difficult poses for extended periods. She was an early model for the well known photographer Nickolas Muray (1892–1965), who was for a short time her brother-in-law.

== Personal life ==
She married Jean Henry Raoul Delteil, known as Jean Myrio, another classically trained dancer from Fokine's company. In the 1930s she and Myrio performed at a number of nightclubs in Paris and London, and their dance interpretation of George Gershwin's Rhapsody in Blue at the Kit-Cat Club was recorded in a Pathé motion picture review. In 1939 they worked at the Casino de Paris together with Josephine Baker. Jean had a small house in the Dordogne where Maurice Chevalier, with friends Baker and Nita Raya, were hidden from German invaders during World War II. After the war, Desha and her husband established the first classical dance school in the French town of Bergerac, Dordogne. A French source claims she died in 1980 and is buried in Bergerac.
