= The World in His Arms =

1952 film by Raoul Walsh

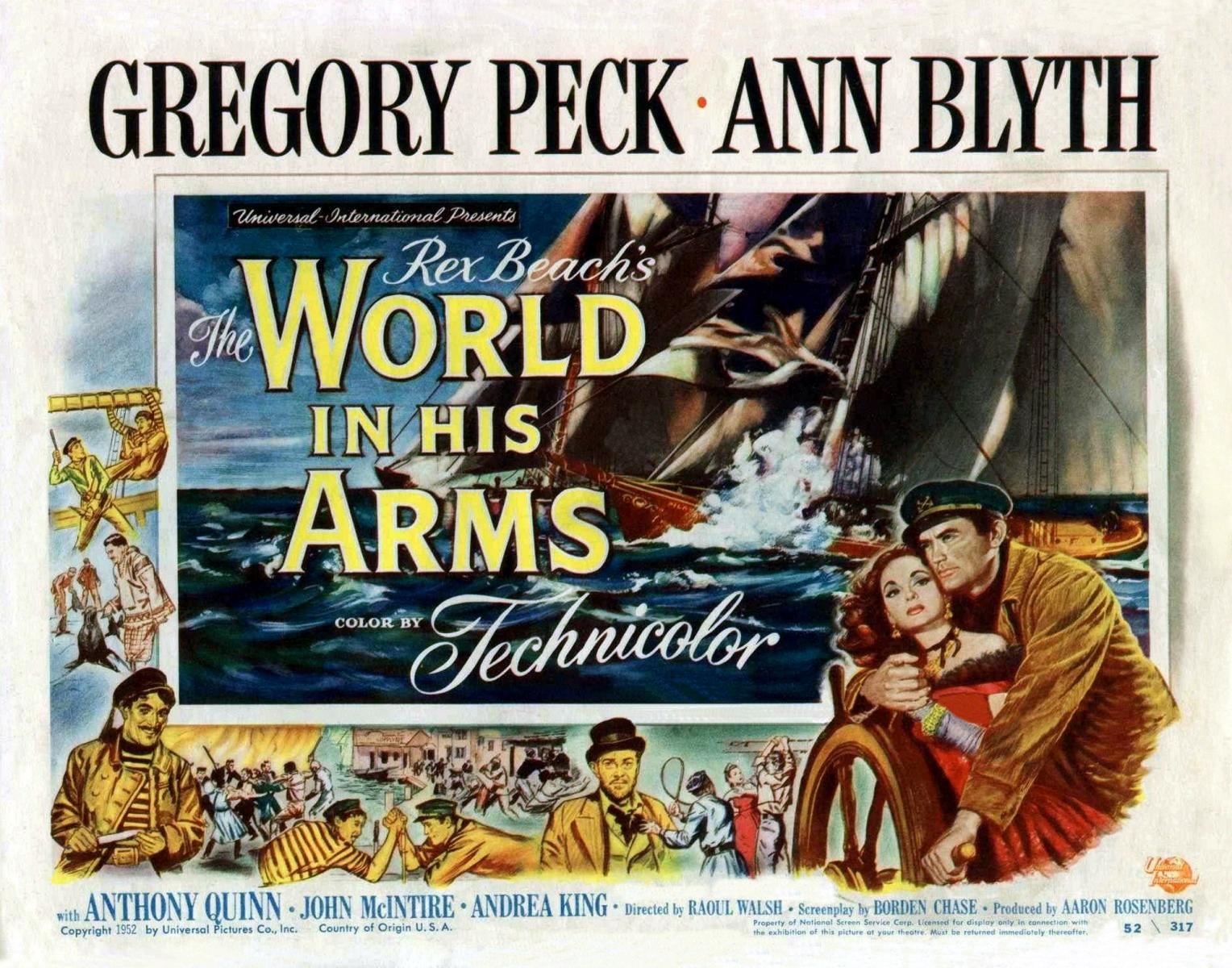
- Original film poster by Reynold Brown
- Directed by: Raoul Walsh
- Written by: Borden Chase; Horace McCoy (additional dialog)
- Based on: The World in His Arms by Rex Beach
- Produced by: Aaron Rosenberg
- Starring: Gregory Peck; Ann Blyth; Anthony Quinn
- Cinematography: Russell Metty
- Edited by: Frank Gross
- Music by: Frank Skinner
- Distributed by: Universal-International
- Release date: October 9, 1952
- Running time: 104 minutes
- Country: United States
- Language: English
- Box office: $3 million (US rentals)

The World in His Arms is a 1952 American seafaring adventure film directed by Raoul Walsh and starring Gregory Peck, Ann Blyth and Anthony Quinn, with John McIntire, Carl Esmond, Andrea King, Eugenie Leontovich, Hans Conried, and Sig Ruman. Made by Universal-International, it was produced by Aaron Rosenberg from a screenplay by Borden Chase and Horace McCoy. It is based on the novel by Rex Beach. The music score was by Frank Skinner and the cinematography by Russell Metty.

== Plot ==
In 1850 San Francisco, Russian Countess Marina Selanova flees from an arranged marriage to Prince Semyon. She books passage with "Portugee" to Sitka, where her uncle Governor Ivan Vorashilov can protect her.

When Portugee's bitter rival, Captain Jonathan Clark, "the Boston-man", frees his shanghaied crew, she sends a man to negotiate with him instead. However, Jonathan hates all Russians and turns down the offer. In desperation, Marina goes to the party he is throwing and, pretending to be the Countess's companion, gets him to change his mind. As he shows her the sights of the city in one whirlwind night, they fall in love. Jonathan proposes marriage and she gladly accepts.

However, Prince Semyon finds Marina and takes her to Sitka. Believing Marina has tricked him, Jonathan races Portugee to Alaska, recklessly wagering his ship on who gets there first. Jonathan wins, but that doesn't stop Portugee from trying to steal his ship anyway. Unluckily, while both crews are brawling, a Russian gunboat appears and takes them all captive to Sitka.

Once there, Prince Semyon forces Marina to agree to marry him in return for Jonathan's freedom. Jonathan and his men double back, rescue Marina, and sail away.

== Cast ==
- Gregory Peck as Captain Jonathan Clark
- Ann Blyth as Countess Marina Selanova
- Anthony Quinn as "Portugee"
- John McIntire as Deacon Greathouse, Jonathan's second in command
- Carl Esmond as Prince Semyon
- Sig Ruman as General Ivan Vorashilov
- Andrea King as Mamie
- Eugenie Leontovich as Anna Selanova
- Bill Radovich as Ogeechuk, Jonathan's Eskimo crewman
- Rhys Williams as Eben Cleggett
- Bryan Forbes as William Cleggett
- Hans Conried as Eustace, hotel clerk

== Production ==
The film was shot on the Universal Studios Lot over a period of 47 days. Due to budgetary constraints, the cast was not available for shipboard filming. Assistant director James Havens filmed the boat race scenes over a period of 50 days off the Atlantic coast near Lunenburg, Nova Scotia and closeups of the lead actors were intercut later. Gregory Peck was paid $100,000 and a percentage of the profits for his role in the film.

== Release ==
The World in His Arms premiered at Fourth Avenue Theatre in Anchorage, Alaska on June 20, 1952. Actresses Lori Nelson, Joyce Holden, Kathleen Hughes and Jeanne Cooper attended the premiere along with star Ann Blyth. The film's general American release took place on October 9.

== Reception and home media ==
Craig Butler of AllMovie says, "Although it has its ups and down, The World in His Arms is generally a good action-adventure-romance yarn. Chief among its assets is the thrilling sea race that is the centerpiece of the film...Credit goes to the director Raoul Walsh...there's so much spirit and heart in this sequence that you can practically touch it...If the rest of the film were as exciting as this section, it would be a masterpiece. Unfortunately, this isn't the case – but fortunately, much of the rest of the film is still quite good and at its worst, it's still average...Quinn plays the part as if he were born to it. Ann Blyth does well as the love interest, and looks lovely." Leonard Maltin describes it as an "Unlikely but entertaining tale." Ben Sachs of Chicago Reader comments "This is not a classic, but it's loads of fun, thanks in part to Walsh's brisk pacing and infectious sympathy for rugged, macho types...Quinn boisterously (overacts) as only he can...even when the story gives way to high seas spectacle, the drama remains stubbornly life-sized."

Variety said "a hearty, salty action film well-trouped by a good cast" and "some of the best sea footage ever put on film."

The film was the eighth most popular movie at the British box office in 1952.

Versions of the film have been released as a VHS videotape, as a region 1 DVD, and in 2020 as a Region A Blu-ray in North America from Kino Lorber.
