= Louis Sorin =

American actor (1893–1961)

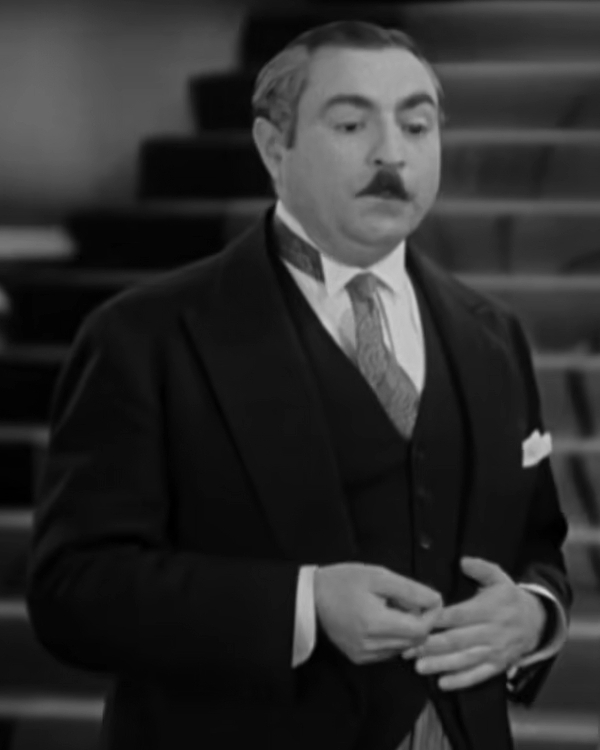
- Sorin as Roscoe W. Chandler in Animal Crackers (1930)
- Born: September 23, 1893; New York City, U.S.
- Died: December 14, 1961 (aged 68)
- Occupation: Actor
- Years active: 1923–1961

Louis Sorin (23 September 1893 – 14 December 1961) was an American actor of stage, screen, radio, and television. He is probably best known to modern audiences for his performance as art patron Roscoe W. Chandler in the 1930 Marx Brothers feature film Animal Crackers, a role he created on the Broadway stage; and for his appearance as Mr. Manicotti in the Honeymooners episode "Mama Loves Mambo" (1956).

== Biography ==
Louis Sorin was born in New York City, and appeared on Broadway in more than 20 productions between 1923 and 1952. Sorin worked in New York almost exclusively, appearing in a handful of feature films produced on the east coast. He specialized in dialect roles, often affecting a Jewish accent. In Paramount Pictures' musical revue Glorifying the American Girl (1929), Sorin and Eddie Cantor appeared as two opportunistic tailors in a comedy sketch. While at Paramount, Sorin re-created his Broadway role in the film adaptation of Animal Crackers. His only other feature-film credit of the 1930s was Moonlight and Pretzels (1933), an attempt by Universal Pictures to film a low-budget ($100,000) musical in New York.

Showman Sid Grauman brought the George S. Kaufman-Moss Hart play Once in a Lifetime, a satire of moviemaking, to Los Angeles in January 1931. Sorin worked alongside future screen comedienne Aline MacMahon and character actor Russell Hopton.

In 1937 Louis Sorin worked in two-reel comedies for New York-based Educational Pictures, again employing various dialects opposite comedy stars Bert Lahr and Willie Howard. Sorin might have continued with Educational, but the studio discontinued production in 1938.

The 1940s established Louis Sorin as a voice actor. From 1942 to 1945, Sorin portrayed Pancho on the radio series The Cisco Kid. He also participated in the New York-produced film Seeds of Freedom (1943), a wartime modernization of the 1925 silent film The Battleship Potemkin combined with new newsreel footage, in which Sorin joined radio actors Junius Matthews, Aline MacMahon, and others in adding spoken dialogue to the silent action.

Sorin came into his own in 1950, when the new field of commercial network television was based in New York, and many programs were broadcast live. Sorin played character parts in many early television productions, notably a 1950 adaptation of Raymond Chandler's The Big Sleep with Zachary Scott, a 1954 United States Steel Hour dramatization of Elmer Rice's The Grand Tour, and a 1955 Hallmark Hall of Fame presentation of another Rice play, Dream Girl, starring Vivian Blaine and Hal March.

Sorin also played a few leads on early TV, including two playlets of 1951. In A Little Night Music, Sorin played an immigrant barber whose devotion to music brings his family to the brink of tragedy. He starred in "The Golden Crown", an installment of Anna May Wong's dramatic series for the Dumont Network, The Gallery of Madame Liu-Tsong. He was also featured as Cousin Simon on NBC's popular comedy series The Goldbergs.

In 1950 he appeared with fellow New York stage veterans Sam Levene and Arlene Francis in an industrial film, With These Hands, produced at the Fox Movietone studio in New York. The film, sponsored by the International Ladies Garment Workers Union, re-enacted the notorious Triangle Shirtwaist Factory fire of 1911.

Sorin kept working until his death on December 14, 1961. His final performance, in an episode of the Naked City TV series, aired the night before he died.

== Partial filmography ==
- Lucky in Love (1929)
- Mother's Boy (1929)
- Glorifying the American Girl (appeared with Eddie Cantor in last skit, 1929)
- Animal Crackers (1930)
- Moonlight and Pretzels (1933)
- With These Hands (1950)
