= The Joe Louis Story =

1953 film by Robert Gordon

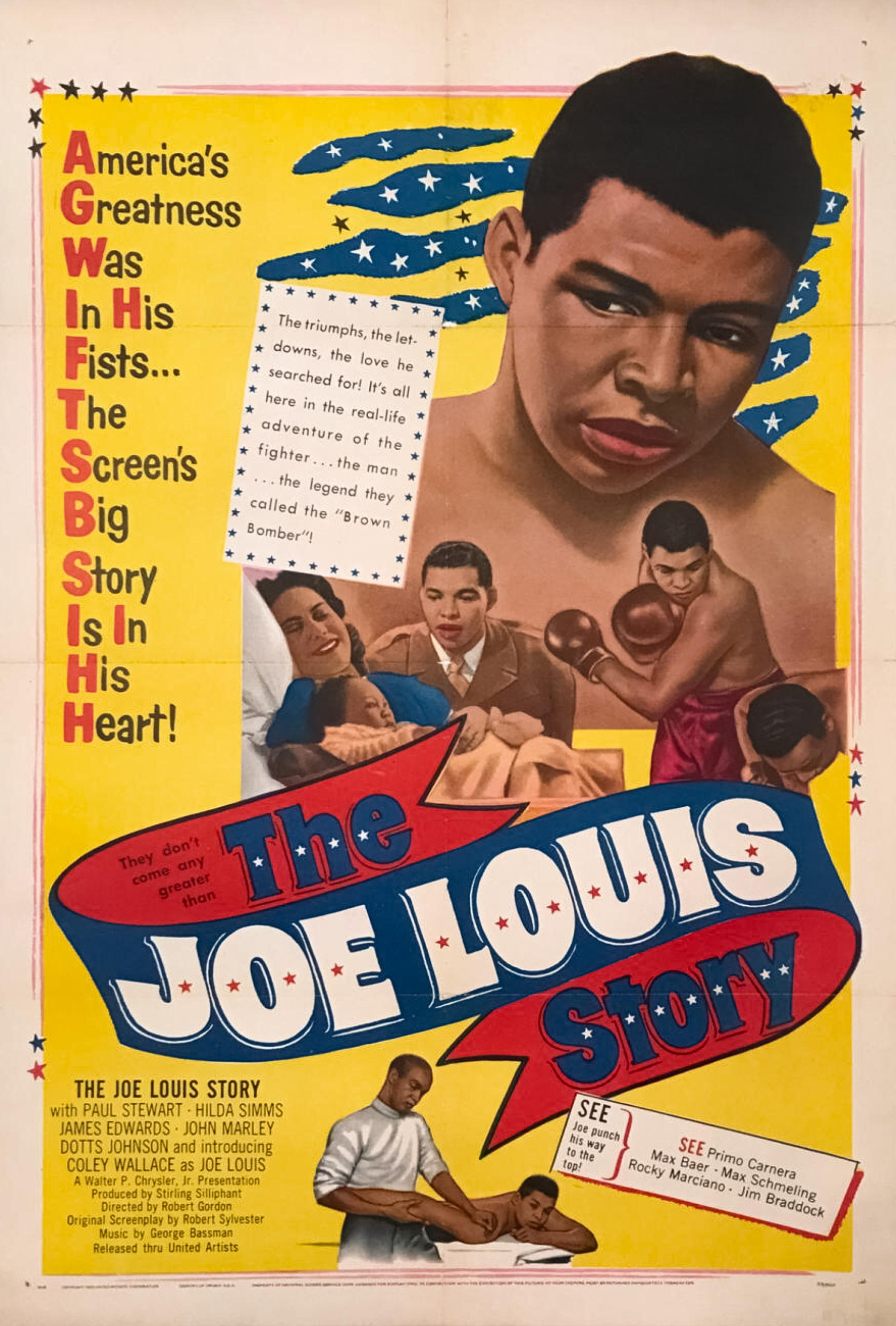
- Directed by: Robert Gordon
- Written by: Robert Sylvester
- Produced by: Stirling Silliphant
- Starring: Coley Wallace; Hilda Simms; Paul Stewart
- Cinematography: Joseph C. Brun
- Edited by: Dave Kummins
- Music by: George Bassman
- Color process: Black and white
- Production company: Walter P. Chrysler Jr.
- Distributed by: United Artists
- Release date: September 18, 1953 (United States)
- Running time: 88 minutes
- Country: United States
- Language: English

The Joe Louis Story is a 1953 American film noir drama sport film directed by Robert Gordon and starring Coley Wallace, Hilda Simms and Paul Stewart.

== Plot ==
Full film

Biographical film about the story of boxer Joe Louis and his rise from poverty to becoming heavyweight champion of the world.

== Cast ==
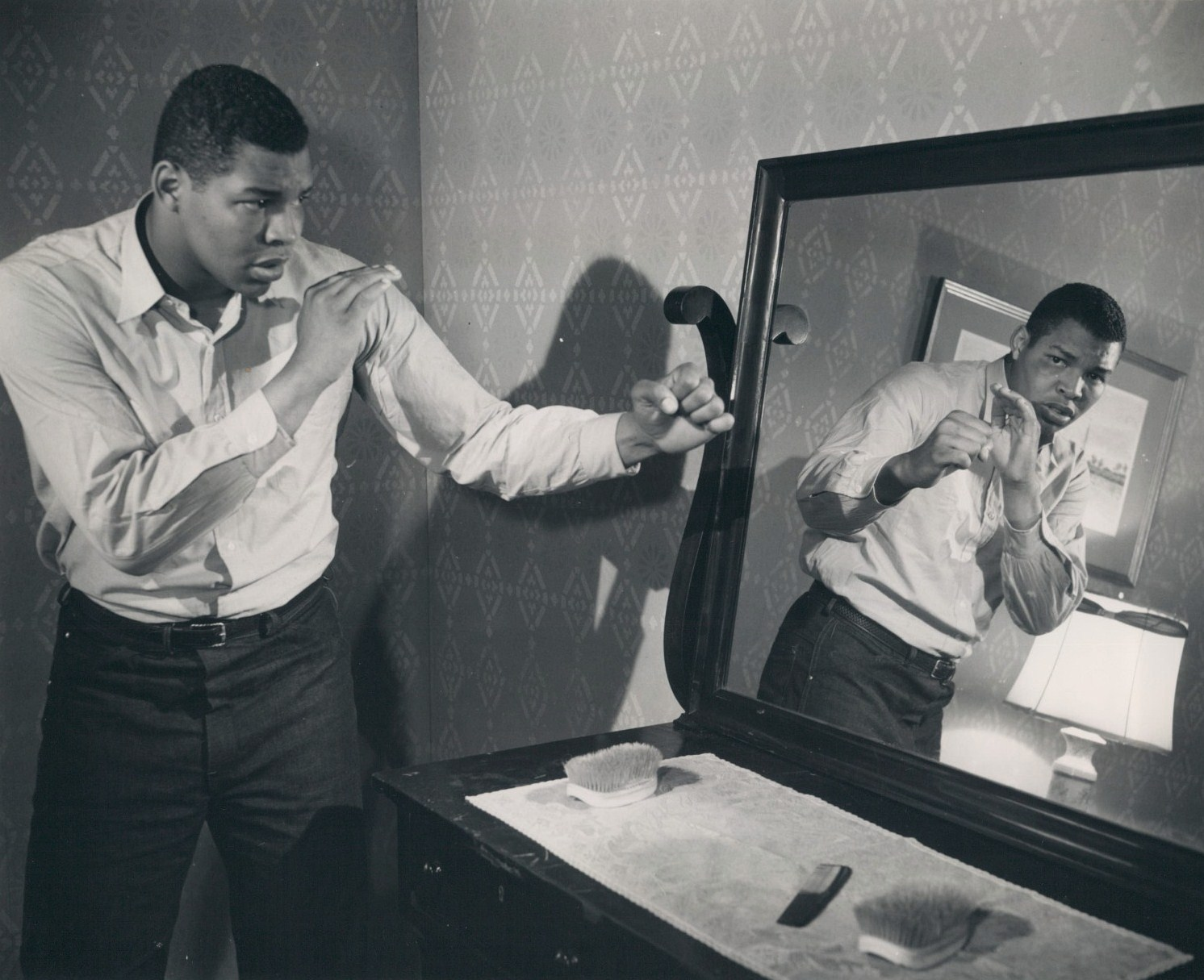
Coley Wallace as Joe Louis

- Coley Wallace as Joe Louis
- Hilda Simms as Marva Trotter Louis
- Paul Stewart as Tad McGeehan
- James Edwards as Jack "Chappie" Blackburn
- John Marley as Mannie Selamon
- Dots Johnson as Julian Black
- Evelyn Ellis as Mrs. Barrows
- Carl 'Rocky' Latimer as Arthur Pine
- John Marriott as Sam Langford
- Ike Jones as Johnny Kingston
- P. Jay Sidney as John Roxborough
- Royal Beal as Mike Jacobs
- Herbert Ratner as Newspaper man
- Ruby Goldstein as himself
- Norman Rose as Lieutenant
- David Kurlan as Bartender
- Ralph Stantley as Nick, the Announcer
- Shorty Linton as himself
- Anita Ellis as herself - Nightclub Vocalist
- Ellis Larkins as himself

== See also ==
- List of boxing films
