= Morton Wishengrad =

American playwright, screenwriter, and lyricist (1922–2002)

- Born: Morton Bernard Wishengrad; December 2, 1913; New York City, New York, U.S.
- Died: February 12, 1963 (aged 49); New York, New York, U.S.
- Other name: Mort Wishengrad
- Education: McKelway Junior High School; Boys High School; Brooklyn College
- Occupations: Screenwriter, playwright
- Years active: 1943 – 1963
- Known for: The Eternal Light
- Notable work: The Rope Dancers
- Spouse(s): Rose Pesin (m. 1934; died 1951); Elizabeth Scott (m. 1952; div. 1958)

Morton Bernard Wishengrad (December 2, 1913 – February 12, 1963) was an American radio and TV script writer, screenwriter, and playwright, best known for his extended tenure as the principal writer on the religious radio series, The Eternal Light.

== Early life and career ==
Born on December 2, 1913, in New York's Lower East Side, Wishengrad was the first-born—and only son—of three children born to Russian-Jewish immigrants, Pauline (née Adelson) and Morris Wishengrad. At some point, the family relocated to Brooklyn, where their son attended McKelway Junior High School, Boys High School, and Brooklyn College.

=== Radio ===
Wishengrad began his radio career in 1943 with NBC's Labor for Victory, followed by 47 episodes of Lands of the Free, a series produced by NBC's Inter-American University of The Air. One of those scripts, The Last Inca, portrays the sixteenth-century Peruvian Inca insurrectionist Tupac Amaru II (as played by Raymond Edward Johnson) and was later included in Joseph Liss's 1947 collection, Radio's Best Plays. Another, "War of the Warsaw Ghetto" (a.k.a. "Battle of the Warsaw Ghetto"), was given a citation by the Writers' War Board as the best war script of 1943. The following year, Wishengrad earned his first of many credits on The Eternal Light, launching an association extending well into the television era, eventually comprising more than 150 episodes scripted. He also wrote numerous episodes of Cavalcade of America.

Additional instances of Wishengrad radio scripts later picked for "Best Play" anthologies include "To the American People" (July 5, 1945 episode of The Halls of Congress, with Paul Muni, Morris Carnovsky, and Ruth Nelson; scored by David Raksin), "How They Knocked the Devil Out of Uncle Ezra" (November 24, 1946 episode of The Eternal Light), and The Camel and I (stand-alone Passover-themed drama, airing April 12, 1949, and starring Sam Levene; a joint MBS/AJC presentation).

In September 1946, on the final four Fridays of the month, NBC presented a mini-"Wishengrad Festival", comprising repeat viewings of some of the writer's most popular Eternal Light offerings. (Note: Despite the cited aticle's clear statement to the contrary, there is no evidence indicating that either the week 3 or week 4 episodes had ever aired previously.) These were, in order of appearance, "Thomas Kennedy" (original air date November 25, 1945; dramatizing the title character's historic—and ultimately successful—fight to remove the discriminatory "Declaration of belief" requirement from Maryland's state constitution), "Lillian Wald" (originally Nov. 4, 1945; recounts career of title character, founder of New York's Henry Street Settlement), "Chronicle of the Dead" ("story of Polish prisoners of the Germans") and "The Parable of Reb Yiszroel"(concerning "a man so good on earth that he was able to influence Heaven").

During the fall of 1949, Wishengrad's work was prominently featured in a weekly series of thirteen Eternal Light rebroadcasts (including seven penned by him—namely, 'How Uriel Got Into Heaven', 'The Thief and the Hangman', 'Moses Mendelssohn', 'Brandeis', 'How They Knocked The Devil Out of Uncle Ezra', 'Ghandi', and 'Emma Lazarus'), commemorating the fifth anniversary of the series' inception in October 1944.

=== Stage and screen ===
In 1950, the writer-star pairing of Wishengrad and Sam Levene—as heard the year before, in The Camel and I, and, before that, in "The Parable of Reb Yiszroel" (1946)—resumed to great effect in his screenwriting debut, the Oscar-nominated "Best Documentary Feature" With These Hands, which benefited greatly from Levene's strong lead performance.

Collaborating with Wishengrad on a number of mid-fifties TV assignments was writer Virginia Mazer, in particular, the series U.S. Steel Hour and the series with which it alternated on a weekly basis, beginning in October 1954,The Elgin Hour. The latter's premiere episode, "Flood", was scripted by the pair.

Regarding Wishengrad's 1957 adaptation of Robert Sherwood's There Shall Be No Night for Hallmark Hall of Fame, at least one viewer, Pittsburgh Post-Gazette critic Win Fanning, detected a distinct improvement on the original.

The great strength in last Sunday's production, beyond that of the Sherwood original, lay in the adaptor's abridging of the playwright's rather too lengthy and show stopping monologues. Unless memory plays unfortunate tricks, I recall that Alfred Lunt, who created the role so magnificently played by Charles Boyer on TV, was called upon to soliloquize at interminable length. What he said was, without doubt, worth saying. It just wasn't very good theater. It is remarkable that Mr. Wishengrad was able to retain Mr. Sherwood's intensity of feeling without resort to the latter's tedious verbosity.

Much of that year was taken up with preparation for the Broadway opening of Wishengrad's The Rope Dancers.

In January 1962, Wishengrad joined the faculty of Hunter College's Speech and Drama Department, where, for one semester, he led a seminar for graduate students in playwriting and directing.

== Personal life and death ==
From 1934 until her death in 1951, Wishengrad was married to Rose Pesin. His second marriage, in June 1962, to singer Elizabeth Leah Cole, ended in divorce not quite six years later. Each marriage produced one son and one daughter.

On February 12, 1963, at age 49, Wishengrad suffered a fatal heart attack at his home on Manhattan's Upper West Side, survived by his four children.

== Postscript: final script, posthumous tributes ==
On February 20, scarcely one week after his death, the premiere of what appears to be Wishengrad's final produced script—a posthumous addendum to his handful of U. S. Steel Hour episodes scripted over the preceding decade—was, with little in the way of fanfare, (Note: Moreover, what little there was—that is to say, that portion of newspaper program summaries which at least identified Wishengrad as the episode's scripter—contained not even so much as a single "late Mr. Wishengrad" mention, strongly indicating that news of the recent passing had not yet filtered down to the average entertainment writer.) broadcast by CBS. Adapted from the like-named H. E. Bates noir novella, (Note: A work which—much akin to classic noirs Double Indemnity and The Postman Always Rings Twice—features the familiar triangle of the young, discontented wife and her considerably older, perhaps oblivious husband—these complemented by a young, attractive, but decidedly hapless male protagonist, seemingly destined to be either directly involved or—as in this case—at least implicated in the latter's death.) Night Run to the West boasted a high-powered cast headed by Ralph Meeker, Colleen Dewhurst, and Henderson Forsythe, supported by John C. Becher and a young Martin Sheen.

About a month and a half later, on Sunday, April 7, Eternal Light's repeat broadcast of Wishengrad's "Tender Grass" did double duty, serving both as an apt Passover installment and as a heartfelt memorial to the series' celebrated alumnus.

On February 7, 1964 (the final Sunday preceding Wishengrad's first yahrtzeit), the writer became the subject of a yet another on-air tribute—this time, strictly audio—paid by his radio alma mater. Featuring excerpts from his 1946 episode, "My Cousin Avigdor", the special broadcast concluded with a brief eulogy delivered by Wishengrad's colleague and longtime friend, actor Raymond Massey. (Note: More than two decades before, Massey had been the featured player attached to Wishengrad's career-launching credit, narrating the wartime radio drama, The Battle of the Warsaw Ghetto. Very much the same sort of collaboration occurred in April 1947, when Massey narrated the similarly themed The Bitter Herb. On television, they teamed at least once, when, in December 1951, Massey portrayed poet Walt Whitman in the Eternal Light episode entitled "Legend of the Mountain". Incidentally, the episode heard during the 1964 broadcast had debuted in January 1946.)

== Honors ==
=== Awards ===
- 1948 Peabody Award for outstanding educational program ("Communism—US Brand")
- 1948-1949 Variety Award as "an important spiritual force in the community" (The Eternal Light)

=== Nominations ===
- 1950 Academy Award for Best Documentary Feature (With These Hands)
- 1958 Emmy Award for Best Teleplay Writing, Half Hour or Less (Frontiers of Faith)
- 1958 Tony Award for Best Play (The Rope Dancers)

== Filmography ==
- With These Hands (1950) – Written by
- The Eternal Light
  - "In the Silent House" (1951) – written by
  - "The Chassidic Tale" (1959) – written by
  - "The Trial of Uriel" (1959) – written by
  - "The Temptation of Reb Yisroel" (1960) – written by
  - "Mrs. Perlberg's Partner in Heaven" (1961) – written by
  - "The Tender Grass" (1962) – written by
  - "The Temptation of Reb Yisroel" (1967, new production) – written by
  - "The Wishengrad Trilogy" (1971) – writer
- Frontiers of Faith
  - "The World of Sholom Aleichem" (1952) - writer
  - "The Microscope and the Prayer Shawl" (1954) – writer
  - "The Camel and I" (1954) – writer
  - "No Wreath and No Trumpet" (1954) – writer
- The Jeffersonian Heritage (miniseries)
  - "The Independent Mr. Jefferson" (1953) – written by
- United States Steel Hour
  - "The End of Paul Dane" (1954) – original screenplay, with Virginia Mazer
  - "Two" (1954) – original screenplay, with Virginia Mazer
  - "Hunted" (1956) – writer
  - "Family Happiness" (1959) – teleplay
  - "Whisper of Evil" (1959) – written by
  - "Night Run to the West" (1963) – written by
- Armstrong Circle Theatre
  - "The Hand of the Hunter" (1954) – writer, with Virginia Mazer
- The Precious Heritage (mini-series commemorating the Jewish people's American Tercentennial)
  - "A Rhode Island Refuge" (1954) – written by
  - "A Night at Valley Forge" (1954) – written by
  - "Passage Home—The Story of Ashur Levy" (1954) – written by
  - "The Cord Over the Abyss" (1954) – written by
- The Elgin Hour
  - "Floodtide" (1954) – writer, with Virginia Mazer
- American Inventory
  - "The Beautiful Endurance" (1955) – written by
- On Camera
  - "The Hand of the Hunter" (1955) – writer, with Mazer
- American Adventure (1955, short) – writer
- The Beginning (1955, short) – writer
- Meet Mrs. Swenson (1956, short) – screenplay
- Mellah (1956, short) – written by
- Hallmark Hall of Fame (1957) – writer
  - "There Shall Be No Night" (1957) – teleplay
- Kraft Television Theatre
  - "The First and the Last" – teleplay
- Hunted (1958) – writer (BBC reboot of like-named 1956 U.S. Steel episode)
- Suspicion
  - "The Death of Paul Dane" (1958) – writer, with Mazer
- De zondvloed (1959, TV movie) – writer, with Mazer (Belgian production of their 1954 Elgin script)
- Our American Heritage
  - "Divided We Stand" (1959)
- The Play of the Week
  - "The Rope Dancers" (1960) – play
- Armchair Mystery Theatre
  - "The Case of Paul Danek" (1960) – writer, with Mazer
- Directions '62
  - "The Thief and the Hangman" (1961) – libretto
- General Electric Theater
  - "The Bar Mitzvah of Major Orlovsky" (1962) – story
- Lichtschacht (1967) – play "The Rope Dancers"
- Woman of Valor (1977, TV movie) – story "As a Wind That Blows"
