= The Rope Dancers =

1957 stage play by Morton Wishengrad

- Original language: English
- Written by: Morton Wishengrad
- Genre: Drama
- Setting: New York City, early 1900s

Premiere
- Date: November 20, 1957
- Place: Cort Theatre

The Rope Dancers is a dramatic stage play written by American playwright Morton Wishengrad (1913–1963). The play premiered on Broadway at the Cort Theatre in 1957. The play was a critical and commercial success, and transferred to the Henry Miller Theatre beginning January 27, 1958 for an extended run. The play was nominated for the Tony Award for Best Play. The plays tells the story of Margaret and James Hyland, who have a daughter born with six fingers and suffers from Saint Vitus' dance.

== Production history ==
The play opened on Broadway at the Cort Theatre on November 20, 1957, and closed on May 3, 1958, running a total of 189 performances. The play was directed by Peter Hall with costumes by Patricia Zipprodt. The play was nominated for six Tony Awards including Best Play, Tony Award for Best Actress in a Play for Siobhán McKenna, Featured Actor in a Play for Theodore Bikel, Featured Actress in a Play for Joan Blondell, Best Scenic Design, and Best Director for Hall.

A television production aired in 1960 with McKenna reprising her role along with Walter Matthau as James Hyland and Audrey Christie as Mrs. Farrow.

== Original cast and characters ==
Character	Broadway (1957)
Margaret Hyland	Siobhán McKenna
James Hyland	Art Carney
Mrs. Farrow	Joan Blondell
Dr. Jacboson	Theodore Bikel
Lizzie	Beverly Lunsford
Lameschnik	Joseph Julian
The Cop	Joseph Boland
The Moving Man	William Edmundson
Clementine	Barbara Ellen Myers
The Mother	Vergel Cook

== Awards and nominations ==
=== Original Broadway production ===
Year	Award	Category	Nominee	Result
1958	Tony Award	Best Play		Nominated
1958	Tony Award	Best Actress in a Play	Siobhan McKenna	Nominated
1958	Tony Award	Best Featured Actor in a Play	Theodore Bikel	Nominated
1958	Tony Award	Best Featured Actress in a Play	Joan Blondell	Nominated
1958	Tony Award	Best Director	Peter Hall	Nominated
1958	Tony Award	Best Scenic Design	Boris Aronson	Nominated
