= Oh, Captain! =

1953 musical

- Playbill from the Broadway production
- Music: Jay Livingston; Ray Evans
- Lyrics: Jay Livingston; Ray Evans
- Book: Al Morgan; José Ferrer
- Basis: 1953 film The Captain's Paradise
- Productions: 1958 Broadway

Oh, Captain! is a musical comedy based on the 1953 film The Captain's Paradise with music and lyrics by Jay Livingston and Ray Evans and the book by Al Morgan and José Ferrer. The basis of the musical was the 1953 film The Captain's Paradise, which had been written by Alec Coppel and Nicholas Phipps.

The musical updated the film's Gibraltar and Algiers setting to London and Paris. The production was dismissed by the critics as a "tired businessman's show", but the cast and choreography were much praised.

A 5-minute dance sequence between Tony Randall (in the title role) and prima ballerina Alexandra Danilova is called "the best five minutes in the show" by Ken Mandelbaum.

== Background ==
There was talk of adapting the movie into a musical as early as 1955. Danny Kaye was mentioned as a possible star and Lindsay and Crouse as possible adaptors. Later Bob Merrill was offered the job as composer and David Wayne was mooted as a possible star.

== Productions ==
Oh, Captain! opened on Broadway at the Alvin Theatre (now the Neil Simon Theatre) on February 4, 1958, and closed on July 19, 1958, after 192 performances. The musical was directed by José Ferrer, with set and lighting design by Jo Mielziner, costumes by Miles White, hair design by Ernest Adler, dances and musical numbers created by James Starbuck, and musical director Jay Blackton. The original cast included Tony Randall as Captain Henry St. James, Abbe Lane, Susan Johnson, Jackie McKeever, Edward Platt, Paul Valentine, and Stanley Carlson.

Abbe Lane was under contract to a rival studio, which refused to allow her to record the original cast album. Her songs were recorded by Eileen Rodgers. Lane did record two of her numbers on one of her subsequent solo albums. Hollywood musical star Dorothy Lamour made her Broadway debut when she replaced Lane for the last week of the Broadway run in July 1958.

Ram's Head, the Stanford theatrical society, produced the show in 1962, starring Laurence Guittard.

42nd Street Moon (San Francisco) presented it in a staged concert in 2003.

== Songs ==
Act I

- "A Very Proper Town" – Captain Henry St. James and the Company
- "Life Does a Man a Favor (When it Gives Him Simple Joys)" – Mrs. Maud St. James and Captain Henry St. James
- "A Very Proper Week" – The English Townspeople
- "Life Does a Man a Favor (When it Leads Him Down to the Sea)" – Captain Henry St. James, Enrico Manzoni and the Crew
- "Captain Henry St. James" – The Crew of the S.S. Paradise
- "The Dock Dance" – The Dockworkers
- "Three Paradises" – Captain Henry St. James
- "Surprise" – Mrs. Maud St. James and the Neighbors
- "Life Does a Man a Favor (When it Puts Him in Paree)" – Captain Henry St. James
- "Hey Madame" – Captain Henry St. James and Lisa
- "Femininity" – Bobo
- "It's Never Quite the Same" – Enrico Manzoni and the Crew
- "It's Never Quite the Same" (Reprise) – Mrs. Maud St. James, Enrico Manzoni and the Crew
- "We're Not Children" – Mrs. Maud St. James and the Spaniard
- "Give it All You Got" – Mae and the Tourists
- "Love is Hell" – Mae and the Ladies of the Ensemble
- "Keep It Simple" – Bobo and Her Dancing Companions

Act II

- "The Morning Music of Montmartre" – Mae and the People of Montmartre
- "You Don't Know Him" – Bobo and Mrs. Maud St. James
- "I've Been There and I'm Back" – Enrico Manzoni and Captain Henry St. James
- "Double Standard" – Bobo and Mrs. Maud St. James
- "All the Time" – Captain Henry St. James
- "You're So Right for Me" – Enrico Manzoni and Bobo
- "All the Time" (Reprise) – Mrs. Maud St. James
- "Finale" – The Entire Company

"All the Time" was recorded by Johnny Mathis and appeared on the 1958 album Johnny's Greatest Hits.

== Critical response ==
Frank Aston of the World Telegram and Sun said of the show, "splendiferous, gaudy. songful, comical, dancing joy that happens none too often!, José Ferrer's production of Oh, Captain! had smooth sailing all the way. It was the outstanding musical success of the Philadelphia season, and found New Yorkers equally eager to absorb its high spirits and salty humours. With no aim other than entertainment, it instantly became one of Broadway's biggest hits and seems securely berthed at the Alvin Theatre for many months to come."

== Awards and nominations ==
=== Original Broadway production ===
Year	Award	Category	Nominee	Result
1958	Tony Award	Best Musical		Nominated
1958	Tony Award	Best Performance by a Leading Actor in a Musical	Tony Randall	Nominated
1958	Tony Award	Best Performance by a Featured Actress in a Musical	Susan Johnson	Nominated
1958	Tony Award	Best Performance by a Featured Actress in a Musical	Jacquelyn McKeever	Nominated
1958	Tony Award	Best Scenic Design	Jo Mielziner	Nominated
1958	Tony Award	Best Costume Design	Miles White	Nominated
1958	Theatre World Award		Jacquelyn McKeever	Won
