= Coley Wallace =

American actor and boxer

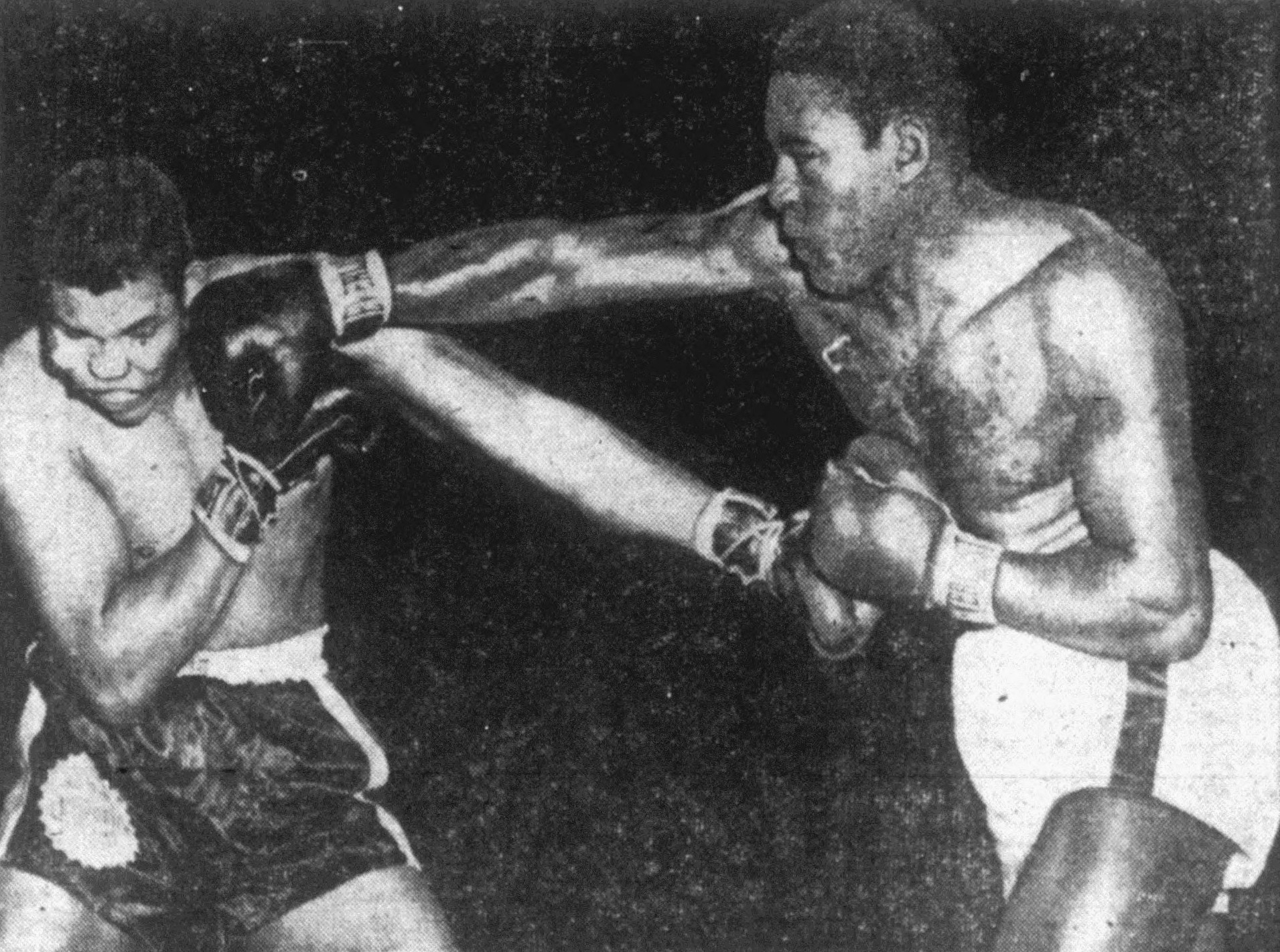
Wallace (left) takes a right hand to the face from Ezzard Charles on December 16, 1953.

Coley Wallace (April 5, 1927 – January 30, 2005) was an American actor and heavyweight boxer who once outpointed Rocky Marciano in a very close split decision three-round amateur fight.

Although Wallace, a Jacksonville, FL native, had a respectable record as a professional (20-7-0), his claim to fame came in 1948 when, as an amateur, he once defeated in a very close split decision future heavyweight champion Rocky Marciano in the finals of the New York Golden Gloves Tournament. The decision was not welcomed by crowd and many considered it a draw. Wallace fought Ezzard Charles in his professional career, among others.

Wallace's contract was "owned" under the table by the notorious Frank "Blinky" Palermo, a member of the Philadelphia crime family. Palermo was imprisoned in 1961 for conspiracy and extortion for the covert ownership of prizefighters.

After boxing career, Wallace acted in four movies, twice portraying the boxer Joe Louis.

Wallace died on January 30, 2005, of heart failure in New York City.

== Filmography ==
- The Joe Louis Story (1953) - Joe Louis
- Carib Gold (1957) - Ryan
- Marciano (1979 TV movie) - Joe Louis
- Raging Bull (1980) - Joe Louis - Cerdan Fight
- Rooftops (1989) - Lester (final film role)
