= The Cave Dwellers =

1957 stage play by William Saroyan

- Original language: English
- Written by: William Saroyan
- Genre: Drama
- Setting: Lower East Side, New York City, 1950s

Premiere
- Date: October 19, 1957
- Place: Bijou Theatre

The Cave Dwellers is a dramatic stage play written by American playwright William Saroyan. The play premiered on Broadway at the Bijou Theatre in 1957. The play follows a group of people who are homeless residing inside an abandoned theatre, until a demolition crew shows up.

== Production history ==
The play opened on Broadway at the Bijou Theatre on October 19, 1957, and closed on January 11 running a total of 97 performances. The play was directed by Carmen Capalbo. For her performance, Eugenie Leontovich was nominated for the Tony Award for Best Actress in a Play.

The play had an Off-Broadway production in 2007, produced by the Pearl Theatre Company.

== Original cast and characters ==
Character	Broadway (1957)
The King	Barry Jones
The Queen	Eugenie Leontovich
The Duke	Wayne Morris
The Girl	Susan Harrison
The Father	Gerald Hiken
Wrecking Crew Boss	Clifton James
James, A Workman	Ivan Dixon
Gorky, A Workaman	Ron Weyand
The Silent Boy	Jon Alderman
The Mother	Vergel Cook
