= Elena Miramova =

American actress and playwright

- Born: May 27, 1901; Tsaritsyn, Russian Empire
- Died: July 8, 1992 (aged 91); Ventura, California

Elena Miramova (27 May 1901 – 8 July 1992) was an American actress and playwright.

== Beginnings and training ==
Miramova was born in 1901 in Tsaritsyn, Russian Empire (currently, Volgograd, Russia), and emigrated to New York City with a brother who died when she was eleven years old. She worked at a nightgown factory to support herself until a wealthy family with an interest in theatre discovered her and helped put her through school. Samuel James Hume, who discovered Miramova, had been director of the Arts and Crafts Theatre in Detroit and became director of the Berkeley Greek Theatre in 1918. The girl had an instant attraction to the stage, and now on stage in Berkeley, Hume felt her Russian accent would limit her in a career in theater. He sent her to study acting and work on her accent at the experimental Cornish School in Seattle in 1922.

After some months, she came at last to live with the school's founder and director, Nellie Cornish, who having "always wanted a daughter of my own" sometime later adopted Miramova. Her training at the Cornish School formed the basis of a successful theatrical career.

While at the Cornish School she met the Russian singer and director, Vladimir Rosing, who had come there to teach a four-week master class. The close relationship with Rosing would continue in New York, London and later in California.

== Early performances ==
She married the producer Frederic Theodore Rolbein and traveled through Europe with him, winning acclaim with several roles she performed in England and in continental Europe.

She played Bianca in the 1931 play Anatol, which played 16 January 1931 to Feb 1931 at London's Lyceum Theatre to mixed reviews. Later that year, she appeared for three weeks in the play Grand Hotel at the Adelphi Theatre, after the lead Eugenie Leontovich fell ill and left the production for a short rest. Despite Miramova's brief time in the role, she was spotlighted as "outstanding in a cast of clever players," and her portrayal of the Russian ballerina Grusinskaya was hailed as "a thing of sheer beauty." In the following year she appeared in another Russian leading role in London. The Stage praised her "impassioned and most spirited" Vera Levine, a young idealist in the U.S.S.R. in F. L. Lucas's The Bear Dances (Garrick Theatre, 1932), the first dramatisation of the Soviets on the West-end stage.

Returning to New York after her husband died, she found that her strong Russian accent typecast her as a "Continental actress" in the American theatre and limited the roles she was offered; her fortunes took a downward turn, and she recalled during a later interview how she had been barred from a hotel room for non-payment while rehearsing a show.

== Later roles ==
Despite the above concerns, she was next cast as Theodora in the comedy Theodora, the Quean (the word "quean" meaning "harlot"), which had five performances at Philadelphia's Forrest Theatre, beginning 31 January 1934. Her next appearance was in Scarborough, New York in the play Short Story in September 1934. The next year, she played Marianne Pentland in the drama Times Have Changed, from 25 February 1935 to March 1935. She then went to Ann Arbor, Michigan for the Ann Arbor Festival in May 1937, where she played in the comedy Tovarich, and that same year, starred in Lucrezia Borgia, which opened 9 August 1937 at the Wharf Theatre in Provincetown.

By the time she appeared as Mrs. Carroll in the 1937 drama The Two Mrs. Carrolls, at Pittsburgh's Nixon Theatre, Miramova had already "pretty much taken London by storm" in past performances of the play. She then performed briefly in Ogunquit, Maine in the show Fata Morgana, during the week of 11 July 1938. Later, she starred in the two-person show Close Quarters, which opened 6 March 1939 and ran for six shows at the John Golden Theatre in New York. Finally, she appeared in the Berkeley Theatre Festival in April 1941.

== Miramova the writer ==
Frustrated with her career difficulties and pondering the quirks of the Russian character, Miramova decided in 1940 to write her own play, with custom-tailored roles for herself and two of her fellow Russian-American actresses. In collaboration with Eugenie Leontovich, her long-time friend with whom she had shared Grand Hotel's starring role in 1931, she wrote the comedy Dark Eyes and submitted the script to producer Ben Hecht for an opinion. The play went into production in 1942, premiered in January 1943, and enjoyed a six-month run at the Belasco Theatre in New York. In March 1943, Warner Brothers purchased the film rights to the play. Miramova earned $250,000 in the transaction, but the planned movie was never made.

In addition to its theatrical success, Dark Eyes also provided a rare insight into Miramova's psyche. She played the character Tonia Karpova, and during a 1943 interview with The New York Times, she described both herself and her stage alter-ego as "not a plate of sex appeal, but kind, metaphysical, and trying very hard to keep a belief in God"; the interviewer characterized Miramova, like Tonia, as delicately feminine, intelligent, strong, and enduring. She began work on a second play in 1944, a comedy about a mother and daughter, but this work apparently was never completed.

== Marriage and final years ==
In May 1945, she married army captain Byron Carr Moore in Pittsfield, Massachusetts. Her theatrical career seems to have ended at this time, as no further mention of her in print sources in English can be found. She spent the winter of 1946-7 in Iceland, where her husband had been hired by the recently founded Icelandic airline Loftleiðir to train their first pilots. During the year that Miramova spent in Iceland, she was a regular visitor to the house of Halldór Laxness, who received the Nobel Prize in Literature in 1955. Miramova gave at least one private reading of her "new play" at Laxness' house. In her memoirs, Laxness' wife Auður fondly remembers Miramova, whom she calls "one of those enchanting women one can never forget".

== Death ==
Elena Miramova Moore died in Ventura, California on 8 July 1992, at the age of 91.

== See also ==
- Dark Eyes
- Eugenie Leontovich
