= Miss Isobel =

1957 play by Michael Plant and Dennis Webb

Miss Isobel is a 1957 play by Michael Plant and Dennis Webb.

== Premise ==
An elderly lady regresses to her childhood.

== Background ==
It was originally written by Australian Michael Plant. It was optioned in 1955 by actor Paul Douglas who called it a play "filled with great charm" and he wanted Helen Hayes to star. The script had originally been sent to Douglas as a TV show.

In 1956 producer Leonard Stillman read the play and became enthusiastic. In December of that year he took over the option from Douglas. The play had been co written by a 48 year old Yorkshireman, Dennis Webb. Shirley Booth became attached to star. Darryl Richard played the role of Robin in the Broadway play.

Sir Cedric Hardwicke signed to direct. There was film interest in the play. The budget of the Broadway production was $120,000.

The play debuted on Broadway in December 1957. Brooks Atkinson of the New York Times said the play was "difficult to like". It ran for 53 performances and is considered a flop.
