= Dark Eyes (play) =

Dark Eyes is a play written by Elena Miramova (in collaboration with Eugenie Leontovich) that premiered in 1943. The comedy centers on three Russian-American actresses who have fallen into serious financial trouble and are urgently seeking a backer for their new play. The story is based upon an earlier Miramova work called "Love Is Not a Potato"; the play originally was titled To the Purple.

== List of characters ==
- John Field: A well-to-do widower and successful businessman who lives in Long Island with his family.
- Grandmother Field: John's mother, whose birthday is the day that the play begins.
- Larry Field: John's son, twenty-two years old, a self-described "bum".
- Helen Field: John's daughter, younger than Larry, a girl of romantic temperament and the fiancée of Nikolai.
- Pearl: A Negro maid who works for the Fields.
- Willoughby: A butler employed by the Field family.
- Prince Nikolai Toradje: A Georgian émigré, charming and self-assured, who has proposed to Helen shortly before the play takes place.
- Natasha Rapakovich: A Russian-American actress in her late 30s, vibrant and dramatic, former lover of Nikolai.
- Antonina (Tonia) Karpova: A Russian-American actress in her 30s, deeply religious and idealistic.
- Olga Shmilevskaya: A Russian-American actress in her 50s, practical and able.

== Plot summary ==
The play is set in the Field family home in Long Island, New York, on a summer day in 1942. It opens with Larry revealing that John has just phoned about his early return from Washington, D.C.; John is very weary from this business trip and doesn't want to see anyone. Helen is dismayed at this news, for she has already invited her fiancé, Nikolai, over for the evening. She then receives a telegram from Nikolai, telling her that he will be coming with three of his Russian friends for her to meet. Nervously, the two siblings prepare to receive their father, Nikolai, and three unexpected guests.

The three women - Natasha, Tonia, and Olga - arrive, and Nikolai speaks privately with them. Their conversation reveals that the three women have just been evicted; Nikolai then discovers that they wrote a check to their landlord from a closed bank account. He informs them that the police will be looking for them and advises them to be kind to the Field family as their only hope of aid. They return to the Fields' living room as John arrives home, and everyone meets and converses. The three actresses then employ their singing and dancing talents to celebrate Grandmother Field's birthday in grand style.

Tonia talks with John and discusses the difficulty of finding acting work in New York when one is typecast as a "Continental actress". She then confides in him that she and Natasha have written a play that "no-one in the world can act but we ourselves", a tragedy about two sisters still in love with a man who is dead. John is amused by the plot description and by Tonia's odd intensity, and he volunteers to pay the initial cost of their play's production: five hundred dollars, the exact amount of their bad check. The three ladies are overcome with gratitude and joy, and Act 1 ends with them weeping over their sudden good fortune.

Act 2 sets the scene in a guest bedroom, the temporary residence of Tonia and Natasha. Larry comes to the room to profess his adoration to Natasha, and his declarations are interrupted by Nikolai, who escorts the drunk Larry out and then returns to make his own confession. Nikolai tells Natasha that he still cares for her and that Helen has left him. The disbelieving Natasha chides him, reminding him of the war and scolding him for "playing love games" while Russia is fighting for its existence. She tells him that if he will do battle for their homeland, he will have her love and loyalty forever when he returns. He resolves to leave for the Army the next morning.

Natasha and Tonia, finally left alone, talk about John, and Natasha implies that he is only financing their play because he wants to sleep with Tonia. The religious Tonia is horrified and decides to call John to their room to discover the truth. He arrives, and the three argue; John eventually gives up reasoning with the women, who have come to believe that he is only backing their play out of pity and are furious. John exits, and then Tonia begins to weep; she has fallen in love with John and had hoped he would declare his feelings for her.

The next morning, Natasha discovers that Nikolai was indeed lying and that Helen had not broken their engagement. Distraught and heartbroken, both Natasha and Tonia resolve to return to New York City - on foot if they must - then decide that life is no longer worth living anywhere. They drink poison from a bottle in Natasha's suitcase and calmly sit together, awaiting death.

John then knocks on their door. He has already spoken to Olga that morning, and he explains that he knows their landlord and will take care of their financial trouble. He then gives Tonia the promised check for the play and invites them all to stay at the Field home for as long as they wish. Tonia, overjoyed, reveals that she loves him; he makes his declaration to her in return, then leaves to see Larry and Nikolai off to their enlistment in the Canadian army. Tonia suddenly remembers the poison and panics. The house flies into a flurry of concern, and amidst the hysteria, Olga enters. She smells the bottle and laughs, reminding Tonia and Natasha that she had emptied out the poison years before and replaced it with peach brandy.

The play ends with the three Russians elated, their troubles over and a rosy future ahead, and Tonia (who is to marry John) declares that she no longer wants to produce a tragedy; instead, she begins to describe her idea for a marvelous comedy, about three downtrodden actresses invited to spend a weekend in Long Island.

== Issues in the script ==
The play begins "late afternoon of a summer day in 1942" and concludes the following morning. The exact days involved seem clear after an Act I discussion between Nikolai and Natasha:

Niko: When was the check dated?

Natasha: The 20th. I could not remember the date at the moment. I was too furious. So I put the 20th.

Niko: That was yesterday, Friday.

However, only in February, March, and November 1942 did the 20th fall on a Friday; there were no summer months in which this was the case.

The script also uses a phonetic rendering of the Russian speech and songs, presumably to aid non-Russian actors in pronunciation, but gives no translation (except in rare instances in which the Russians explain their dialogue to the Fields, or in which the lines are immediately paraphrased or answered in English). Finally, the text references songs by simple, common names (Natasha starts to sing "Night", for example), but does not provide the complete song titles or music.

== From conception to Broadway ==
The idea for the play came to Miramova in 1939, when she and Leontovich awkwardly and conspicuously visited the home of a well-to-do American family; she imagined that their gloomy weekend might form the basis of a delightful comedy. Dark Eyes spoofed the peculiarities of the Russian character, and it also included many references to the personalities and careers of its three main actresses. (For example, one comedic moment in the play comes when Natasha bitterly complains about the bleak future for typecast Russian-American actresses and sarcastically points out that perhaps the women will be invited in ten years to play "aging Russian ballerinas - if we're not crippled with rheumatism by then." Contemporary audiences may have understood the joke, if they remembered that both Leontovich and Miramova had played the Russian ballerina Grusinskaya in the popular 1931 play Grand Hotel.)

Though she had no playwriting experience, a less-than-perfect command of the English language, and had already been told by the playwright Moss Hart that her idea was charming but unworkable, Miramova began work on Dark Eyes shortly thereafter, spending three months at her typewriter from seven in the morning until midnight. She later called on Leontovich for help; their collaboration came in the form of long walks, during which they discussed the play's second draft. She sent the completed manuscript to producer Ben Hecht for an opinion, and Hecht invited the three actresses for dinner at the Hecht home, along with Broadway director Jed Harris. Harris, absent from the theater scene for five years prior, had already struck a deal with Twentieth Century Fox for the company to finance an unspecified number of his plays. Dark Eyes was the first play accepted for performance under this agreement.

The play had a brief preview on Christmas Eve in Baltimore. It then officially opened at 8:40 p.m., 14 January 1943 at the Belasco Theatre in New York. It closed on 31 July 1943 after a successful run of 230 performances.

== Other performances ==
The cast next traveled to Manhattan's Audubon Theatre in mid-August 1943 and then appeared at the National Theatre in Washington, D.C., 13–18 September 1943.

The play was performed in 1947 at the Olney Theatre Center in Maryland.

The show played for six nights at the Newport Harbor High School Auditorium in California, beginning 21 June 1948. Eugenie Leontovich reprised her original role as Natasha Rapakovich, with George Reeves producing the play and playing Nikolai.

Finally, the play ran in March 1948 at the Strand Theatre in Westminster, London, England, with Yul Brynner performing in the cast.

Performances after 1948, if any, are unknown. The script is published by the Dramatists Play Service but is currently out-of-print.

== The film ==
In March 1943, Warner Brothers purchased the film rights to Dark Eyes for $250,000. A few weeks later, Bette Davis, Ann Sheridan, and Julie Bishop were cast to play the three Russian ladies, and a release date of June 1944 was set.

In October 1944, Jack Benny joined the cast, and Jerry Wald was named as the film's producer; the release date was pushed back to 1945. However, it appears that the film was never completed.

== Response to the play ==
The New York Times praised Dark Eyes after its opening night performance, dubbing it "a very engaging, entertaining and charming play that is beautifully directed and acted to the last line that is in it."

Time magazine reviewed the play on 25 January 1943 and praised the skillful acting and directing, but panned the "wobbly playwriting" of the script and the "monotonous" nature of the comedy.

Theater critic George Jean Nathan recognized Dark Eyes as the Best Farce-Comedy of the Year in 1943, calling it "intelligently entertaining playgoing".

The play enjoyed widespread success with its American performances; one audience letter referred to the "unanimous approval of the New York critics", and director Jed Harris related, "This Dark Eyes is proving a real hit--no question about it." The opinion abroad was also positive, with The London News-Chronicle calling the Russians' antics "utterly absurd but very enjoyable" and promoting the play as "a delirious farce of slight pretensions." Published audience letters agreed with official sources, with one writer stating that Miramova "deserves the success she is having" with her "hilarious comedy".

== See also ==
- Elena Miramova
- Eugenie Leontovich
