= Eugenie Leontovich =

Russian-American dramatist

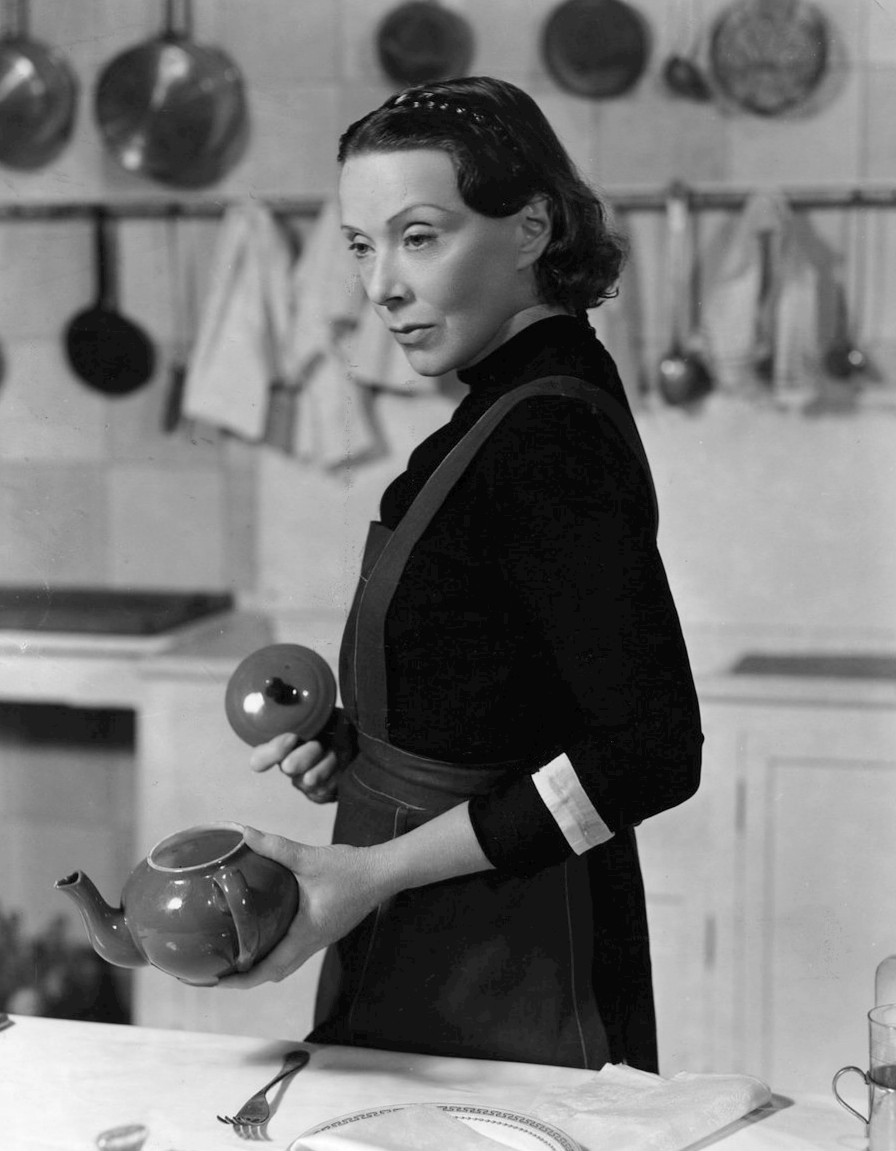
- Leontovich as Tatiana in Tovarich
- Born: Yevgeniya Konstantinovna Leontovitch; March 21 or April 3, 1900 (other sources indicate 1893, 1894, or 1898); Podolsk, Russian Empire
- Died: April 2, 1993; New York, New York, U.S.
- Occupations: Actress; dramatist; acting teacher
- Years active: 1922–1962
- Spouse(s): Paul A. Sokolov (1916–1922; divorced); Gregory Ratoff (1923–1949; divorced)

Eugenie Leontovich (born Yevgeniya Konstantinovna Leontovitch; Russian: Евге́ния Константи́новна Леонто́вич; March 21 or April 3, c. 1900 (Note: Leontovich cited the latter date on her U.S. naturalization paperwork; the discrepancy may be between the O.S. (Julian) and N.S. (Gregorian) calendars) in either 1900, which most sources cite and which Leontovich herself claimed, or earlier, i.e. 1893, according to a border crossing manifest from September 23, 1922, which gives her age as 29, indicating 1893 as her year of birth, or 1894 or 1898, according to different travel manifests.) – April 2, 1993) was a Russian-American actress with a distinguished career in theatre, film and television, as well as a dramatist and acting teacher.

In an obituary, she was described as "[o]ne of the most colourful figures of the 20th-century theatre, a successful actress, producer, playwright and teacher." She was nominated for a Tony Award for Best Lead Actress in a Play for William Saroyan's The Cave Dwellers.

== Early life ==
Born in Podolsk, she studied at Moscow's Imperial School of Dramatic Art, and then under Meyerhold at the Moscow Art Theatre, which she subsequently joined. The daughter of Konstantin Leontovitch, an officer in the Russian Imperial Army, she suffered greatly during the Revolution. Her three brothers (who were Army officers like their father) were murdered by the Bolsheviks. In 1922, she "found her way to New York City and set about mastering the English language". That year, she joined a touring company of the musical Blossom Time in 1922 and traveled throughout much of the U.S. Her success led to Broadway stardom.

== Career ==
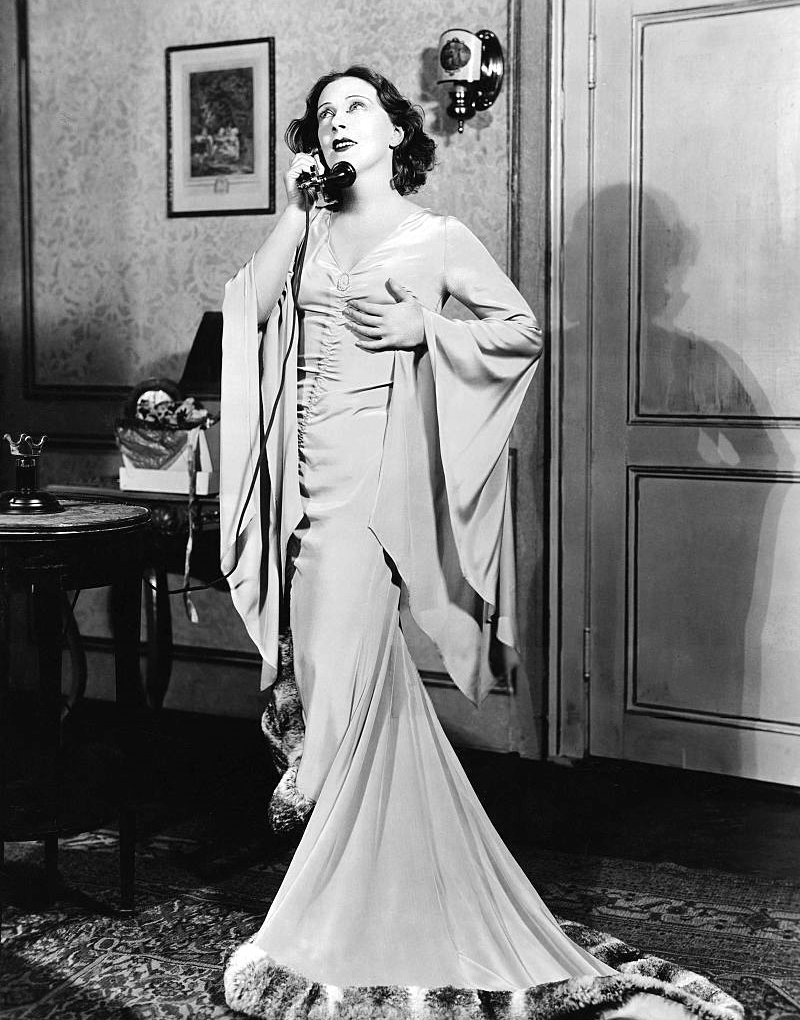
Eugenie Leontovich as Grusinskaia, the dancer, in the original Broadway production of Grand Hotel (1930)

After touring the country in Blossom Time, she was cast as Grusinskaia in the Broadway adaptation of Vicki Baum's novel Grand Hotel. An enormous success, the play, which opened in 1930, was later filmed with Greta Garbo in the part created by Leontovich. After Grand Hotel, Leontovich was given the role of Lily Garland (a.k.a. Mildred Plotka) in Twentieth Century, a comedy by Ben Hecht and Charles MacArthur. She played the role from December 29, 1932, until May 20, 1933.

She also played the Archduchess Tatiana in Tovarich, a comedy about a pair of Russian aristocrats who survive in Paris by going into domestic service. It was in this play that she made a highly successful London debut at the Lyric Theatre in 1935, with Cedric Hardwicke as her co-star. During World War II, she appeared on Broadway in Dark Eyes, a comedy she wrote with Elena Miramova about three Russian exiles in New York. The play was produced in London after the war with Eugenia Delarova and Irina Baronova.

In 1936, she played Shakespeare's Cleopatra at the New Theatre, returning to London in 1947 as a female Russian general in a farce which she co-wrote, Caviar to the General, which temporarily displaced Phyllis Dixey at the Whitehall. A year later, she moved to Los Angeles, where for the next five years she had her own theatre, The Stage, where she both produced and performed.

In 1954, she created the role of the Dowager Empress in the play Anastasia on Broadway. (The role was played by Helen Hayes in the film version.) In 1972, she adapted Anna Karenina for off-Broadway, calling it Anna K. and appearing in it with success. Leontovich made a handful of films. For most of her long professional life, she was identified with the stage. For seven years in the 1960s, she was artist in residence at the Goodman Theater in Chicago. She taught acting in California and New York.

== Personal life and death ==
Leontovich, whose students addressed her and referred to her as "Madame", lived in a Manhattan apartment surrounded by family pictures and icons. Both of her marriages ended in divorce, and she had no children. She became a naturalized United States citizen on September 5, 1929. According to her official biography, her first husband, Paul Sokolov, was purportedly a Russian noble. Her second husband was actor, producer, and director Gregory Ratoff, whom she married on January 19, 1923; they lived in California until their divorce, and she moved to New York.

She died on April 2, 1993 in New York City.

== Broadway plays ==
Leontovich made her Broadway debut in 1922 in Revue Russe, appearing with Gregory Ratoff, whom she married the following year. She appeared on Broadway in Bitter Oleander (1935), Dark Eyes (1943) which she co-wrote, and Obsession (1946). Her most notable role as the Dowager Empress in Anastasia (1954).

== Filmography ==
She appeared in a handful of films: Four Sons (1940), The Men in Her Life (1941), Anything Can Happen (1952), The World in His Arms (1952), The Rains of Ranchipur (1955) and Homicidal (1961). She also appeared in two episodes of the television series Naked City, once opposite Viveca Lindfors, her former Anastasia co-star and a personal friend. Despite being more than two decades Lindfors's senior, Leontovich predeceased her by only two years.

Year	Title	Role	Notes
1940	Four Sons	Frau Bern	
1941	The Men in Her Life	Marie	
1952	Anything Can Happen	Anna Godiedze	
1952	The World in His Arms	Anna Selanova	
1955	The Rains of Ranchipur	Maharani	
1961	Homicidal	Helga Swenson	
