= Susan Johnson (actress) =

American actress

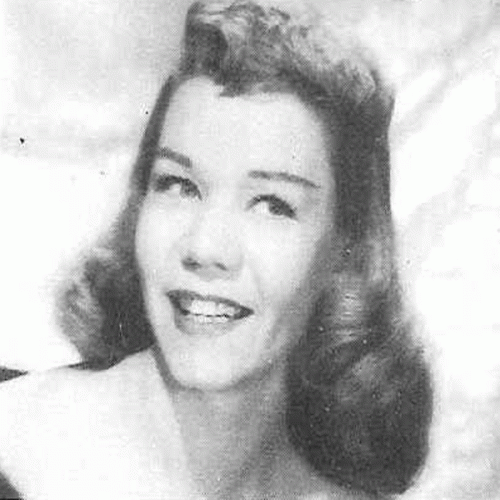
- Johnson in 1955
- Born: Marilyn Jeanne Johnson; July 6, 1927; Columbus, Ohio, U.S.
- Died: February 24, 2003 (aged 75); Sacramento, California, U.S.
- Occupations: Broadway actor, singer, actor

Susan Johnson (born Marilyn Jeanne Johnson, July 6, 1927 – February 24, 2003), also known as Susan Johnson-Kehn, was an American actor and singer. She is most well known for her Broadway performances during the 1950s, but also appeared in several films and television shows.

== Biography ==
Johnson was born in Columbus, Ohio. She began singing professionally at the age 3 and performed with the Columbus Opera & Symphony Company while she was in her 20s. She attended Ohio State University, then moved to New York City to study singing.

Johnson arrived in New York in 1947. She appeared on Broadway in Brigadoon (1950), Buttrio Square (1952), The Most Happy Fella (1956–57), Oh Captain! (1958), Whoop-Up (1958–59), and Donnybrook! (1961). She won the 1956 Theatre World Award for her role in The Most Happy Fella and was nominated for a Tony Award in 1958 for her role in Oh Captain! She also acted in the national touring company of Brigadoon and in productions of Theatre Under the Stars in Vancouver, Canada.

In 1962, Johnson was thrown from her motor scooter into oncoming traffic while filming for a stock production. The accident left Johnson with a fractured skull and temporary deafness that affected her singing voice.

Johnson married retired professional baseball player Chet L. Kehn, Jr. in 1965, and the couple moved to Southern California when their daughter Corianne was born. In 1982, Johnson got involved with a local Sacramento dinner theater named Garbeau's.

Johnson retired to Southern California in 1984 and became a widow when her husband died suddenly at a San Diego Padres game on April 5, 1984. After his death, Johnson returned to the stage with productions in Hawaii (Annie) and later she appeared in the films My First Love (1988), Sister Act (1992) and Sister Act 2: Back in the Habit (1993).

Johnson was married three times during her life. Her first marriage to actor Robert Pastene ended in divorce. Her second husband Lawrence Brown left her after her accident in 1962. Her third marriage to professional baseball player Chet Kehn lasted from 1965 until his death in 1984.

Susan Johnson-Kehn died of emphysema in 2003 in Sacramento, California, aged 75.

== Filmography ==
Year	Title	Role	Notes
1992	Sister Act	Choir Nun No. 6	
1993	Sister Act 2: Back in the Habit	Choir Nun No. 6	(final film role)
