= Altenbrak =

- Ortsteil of Thale
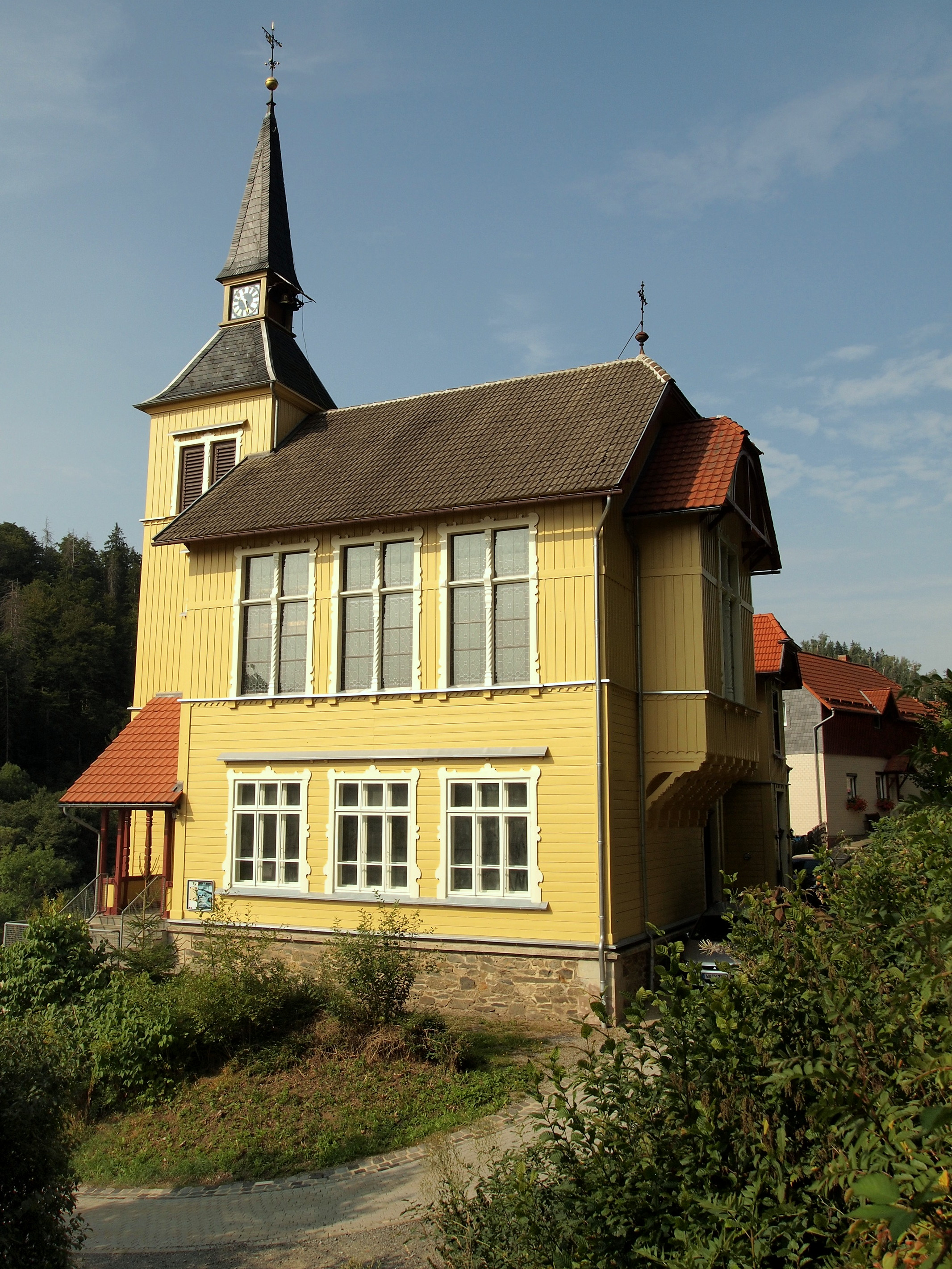
- Church in Altenbrak

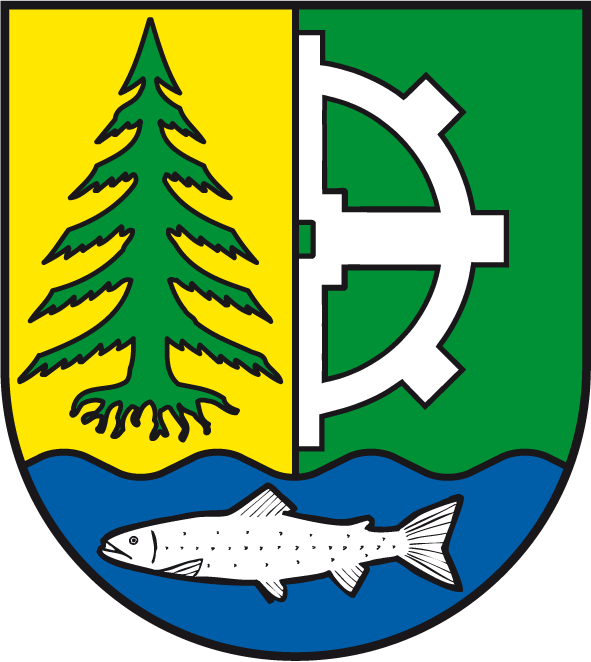
- Coat of arms
- Interactive map of Altenbrak
- Location within Germany Location within Saxony-Anhalt
- Coordinates: 51°44′N 10°56′E
- Country: Germany
- State: Saxony-Anhalt
- District: Harz
- Town: Thale

Area
  - Total: 19.43 km^{2} (7.50 sq mi)
- Elevation: 340 m (1,120 ft)

Population (2017)
  - Total: 332
  - Density: 17.1/km^{2} (44.3/sq mi)
- Time zone: UTC+01:00 (CET)
  - Summer (DST): UTC+02:00 (CEST)
- Postal codes: 06502
- Dialling codes: 039456
- Vehicle registration: HZ

Altenbrak (German: [altn̩ˈbʁaːk]) is a village and a former municipality in the district of Harz, in Saxony-Anhalt, Germany.

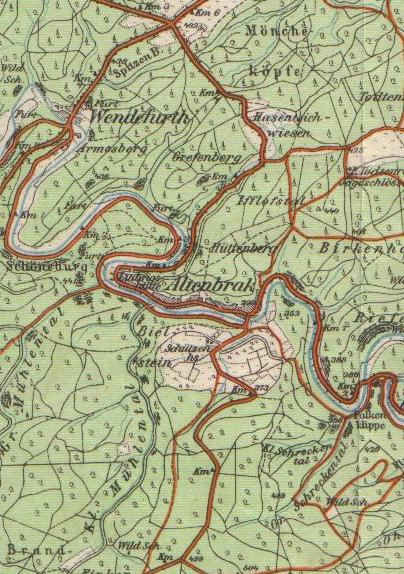
1912 map of Altenbrak

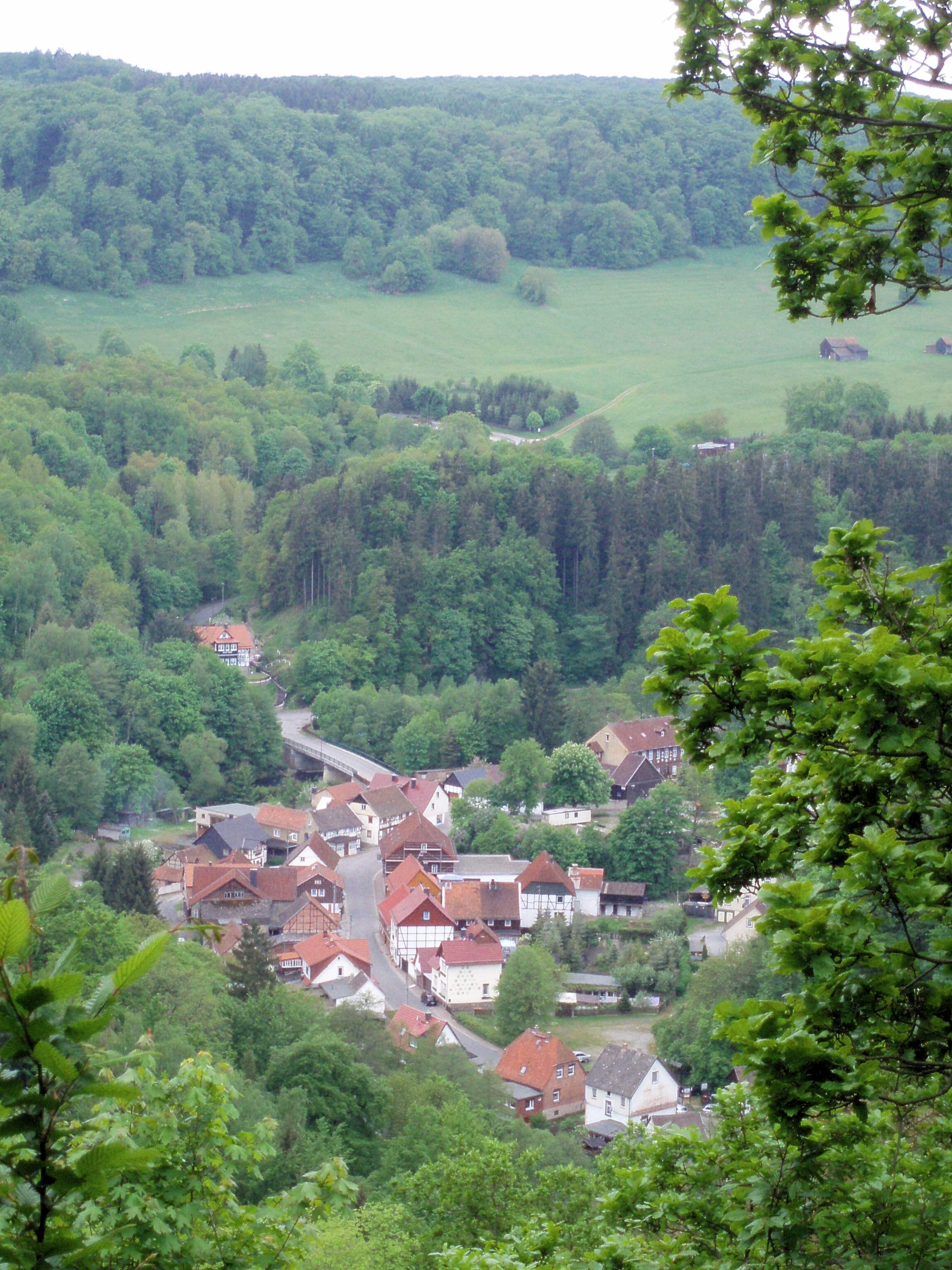
View of Altenbrak from the Böser Kleef vantage point

== Geography ==
The village is strung out for about 1.6 kilometres (0.99 miles) along the River Bode in an east–west valley. It is 3 kilometres (1.9 miles) from the Wendefurth Reservoir, which is part of the Rappbode Reservoir. From its shape and nature, Altenbrak is very much a Straßendorf or ribbon development.

In front of the dam is the hamlet of Wendefurth that used to belong to this parish. Altenbrak's neighbouring communities are Allrode, Blankenburg (Harz), Cattenstedt, Friedrichsbrunn, Hasselfelde, Treseburg, Wendefurth and Wienrode. Within the local area are the forest inn of Todtenrode (Gasthaus Todtenrode) and the Jagdschloss Windenhütte which are also checkpoints 65 and 59 in the Harzer Wandernadel hiking network.

It is a tourist location that has more than 7 accommodations and the outdoor pool of the town to enjoy the summer.

Hotel Weißes Roß

Pension Haus Rodenstein

Pension Restaurant "Zum Harzer Jodlermeister"

Cafe and Pension Theodor Fontane

Ferienhausanlage und Gaststätte Zur Jägerbaude

Pension Harzresidenz

House Bodetal

There is viewing point, Aussichtspunkt Schöneburg, above the village at an elevation of 441 metres (1,447 ft) above sea level. It is checkpoint 63 on the Harzer Wandernadel hiking network.

== History ==
Altenbrak was first mentioned in 1448 as a smelting site. The establishment of the village probably goes back further to 1227. After the last ironworks was closed in 1867 the population became poverty-stricken. Later, tourism developed, encouraged by the sheltered situation of the village.

There has been a private post office (Postagentur) in Altenbrak since 1891. Its post agents were Heinrich Fessel (1891–1902); Adolf Schomburg (1907); Fritz Steffen (1908–09); and Georg Hoffmann (1910–16).

In 1884 Theodor Fontane spent some time in Altenbrak. The Gasthaus zum Rodenstein and other places he visited during his excursion into the Bode Gorge are mentioned in his novel, Cécile. Since 1949 Altenbrak has been a climatic spa (Luftkurort).

Since 1 July 2009, it has been part of the borough of Thale.

== Politics ==
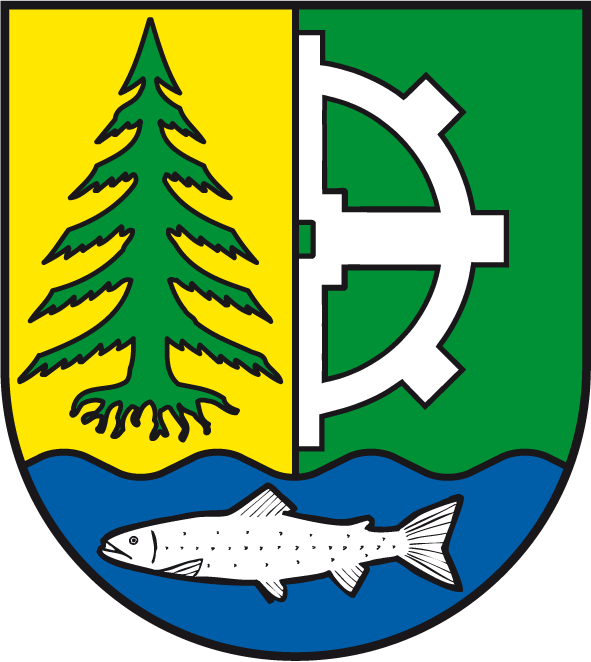
Coat of arms of Altenbrak

=== Coat of arms ===
The coat of arms was approved by the county on 10 July 2008.

Blazon: "Divided vertically gold and green, left a green spruce, right a silver half-waterwheel, in the blue wavy base a silver trout" (Gespalten von Gold und Grün, vorn eine ausgerissene grüne Fichte, hinten ein halbes silbernes Wassermühlrad am Spalt, im blauen Wellenschildfuß eine silberne Forelle.")

The colours of the old parish are the colours green and gold (based on the tincture of the coat of arms).

The coat of arms was created by the Magdeburg herald, Jörg Mantzsch.

=== Flag ===
The flag has two stripes: the left-hand stripe is green and the right is yellow. On horizontal flags the upper striper is green and the lower one yellow. The coat of arms is placed in the centre.

== Culture and places of interest ==
The Harzer Hexenstieg, a hiking trail just under 100 km long, running from Osterode to Thale passes through Altenbrak. Every year on the first weekend in September the Harz Yodelling Competition takes place in Altenbrak. Plays and concerts take place on the forest stage in Altenbrak in the summer. It has seating for 1300.

== Personalities ==
=== Born in the village ===
- Herbert Krebs, born 19 June 1901 in the Todtenrode Forester's House (Forsthaus Todtenrode); died 13 November 1980 in Rechtmehring, forester and hunting author (Vor und nach der Jägerprüfung)
