= Windenhütte Hunting Lodge =

Former hunting lodge

Coordinates: 51°42′2.7″N 10°56′41.3″E

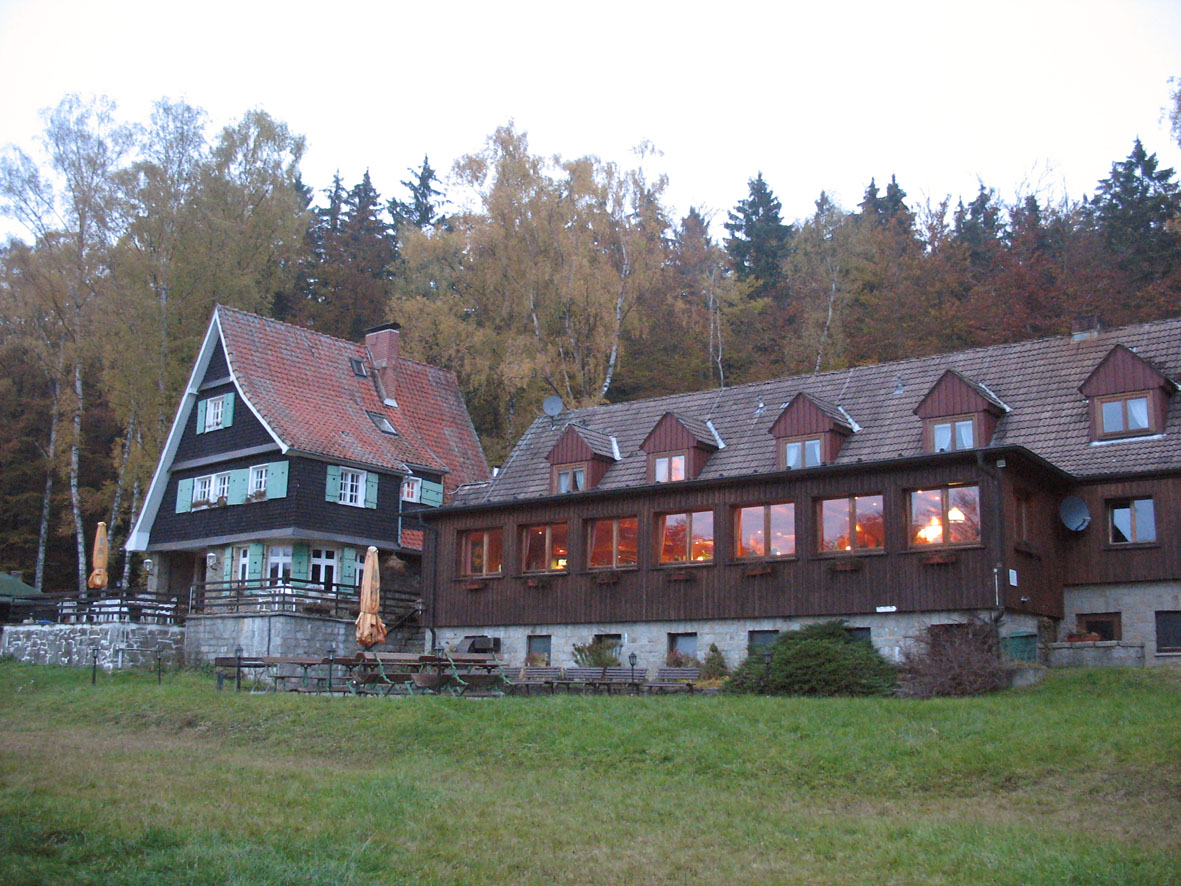

The Jagdschloss Windenhütte is an historic former hunting lodge now serving as a hotel and daytrippers' restaurant in the Harz Mountains of central Germany.

== Location ==
The hunting lodge lies in the district of Harz in the German state of Saxony-Anhalt in woods between Hasselfelde, Altenbrak, Treseburg and Allrode. It is accessible by road from the junction on the B 81 between Cattenstedt and Hasselfelde.

== History ==
In 1872, Duke William of Brunswick had a wooden hunting lodge built in his forest estate in the former district of Blankenburg on the edge of a glade in the fields known as Zu den Winden. It was given the name Windenhütte ("Winden Hut"). About 50 metres away from it, the prince-regent, Duke John Albert of Mecklenburg had the Herzogliche Jagdschloß Windenhütte ("Ducal Hunting Lodge of Windenhütte") built in solid stone between 1906 and 1908. Since 1993, the lodge has become a public restaurant and hotel.

The Windenhütte is checkpoint no. 59 in the Harzer Wandernadel hiking system.
