= Rappbode Auxiliary Dam =

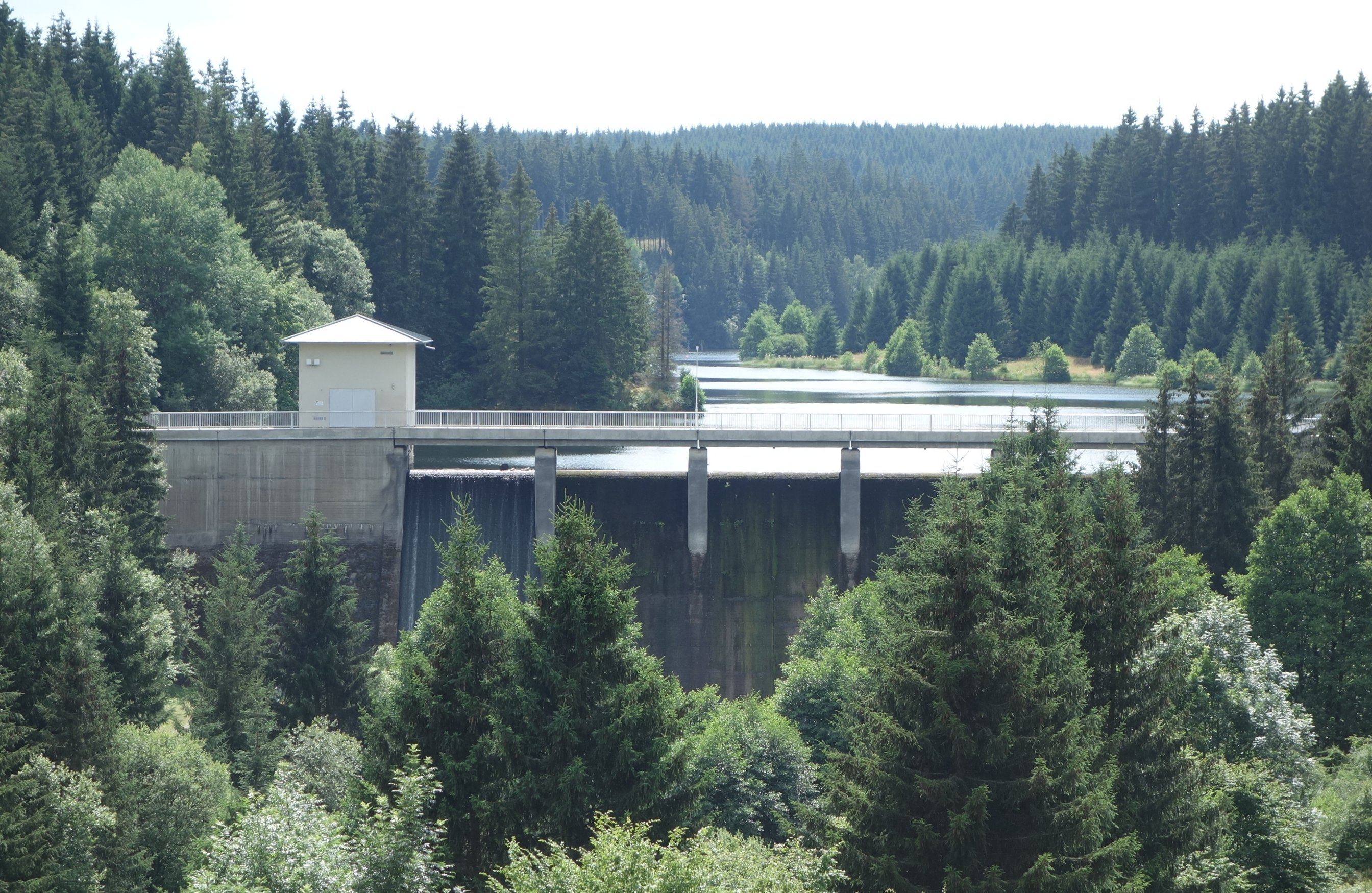

- Location within Germany
- Country: Germany
- Location: Harz
- Coordinates: 51°42′20″N 10°47′39″E
- Opening date: 1961

Dam and spillways
- Height: 25 m (82 ft)
- Length: 118 m (387 ft)
- Dam volume: 21,000 m³

Reservoir
- Total capacity: 1.66 million m³

The Rappbode Auxiliary Dam (German: Rappbodevorsperre) is one of the two auxiliary dams in the Rappbode Dam system. This is the heart of the Rappbode Dam system in the East Harz, which is operated by the Saxony-Anhalt Dam Company (Talsperrenbetrieb des Landes Sachsen-Anhalt) and which also includes the Hassel Auxiliary Dam and the Königshütte, Mandelholz and Wendefurth dams.

The Rappbode Auxiliary Dam near Trautenstein is used, together with the main dam, for supplying drinking water and for flood protection. The auxiliary dam impounds the River Rappbode. It has a 25 m high gravity dam.

The area around the Rappbode Auxiliary Dam is well-suited to walking. Its eastern shore is dominated by numerous rocky crags. On the most important lakeside rocks, where today the reservoir and, formerly, the Rappbode river makes a small bend, there was once a castle, the Trageburg, which, like the Susenburg not far away, was used to guard an old long-distance trade route.

== Gallery ==
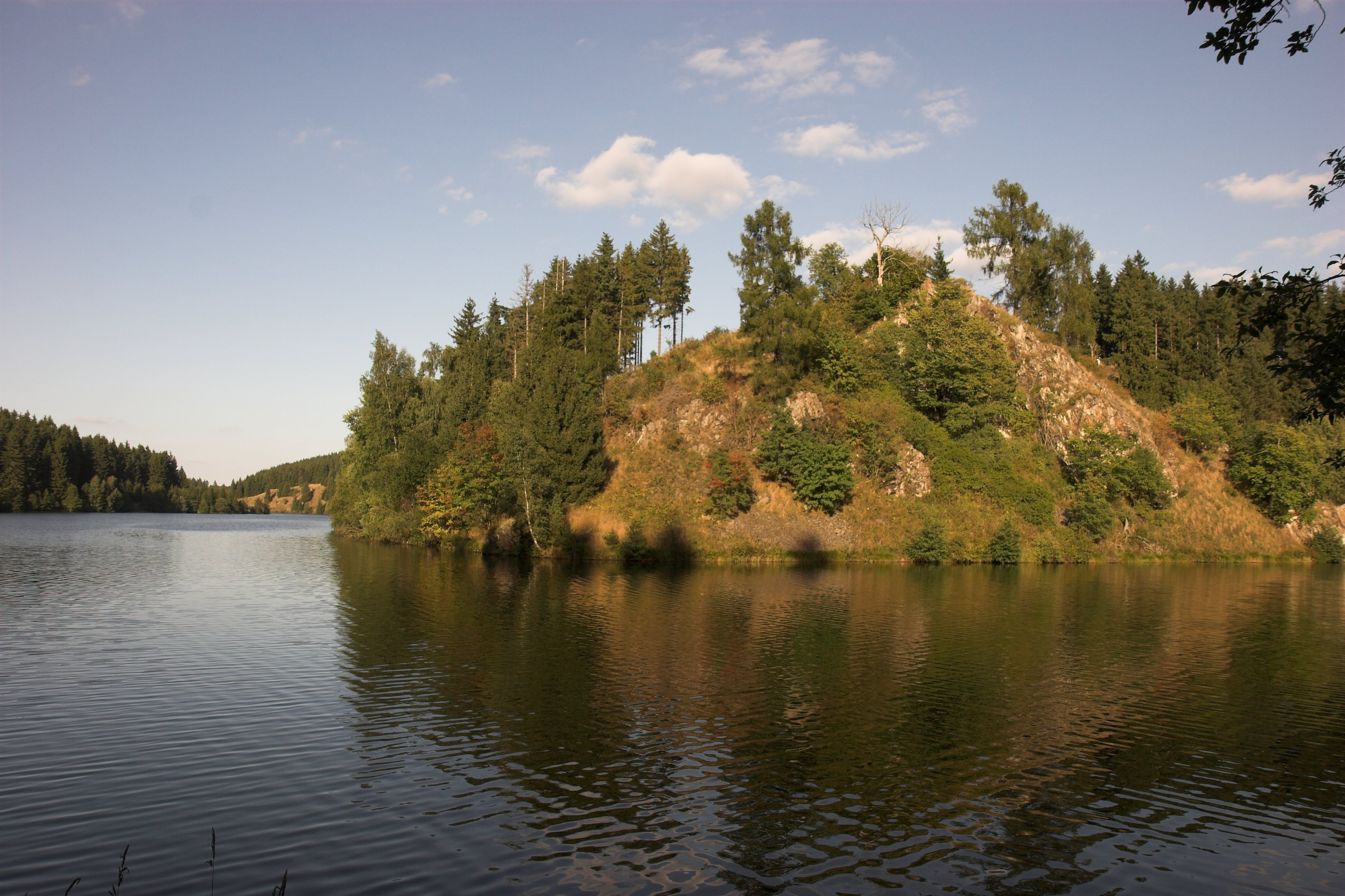
Trageburg castle once stood on these central rocks

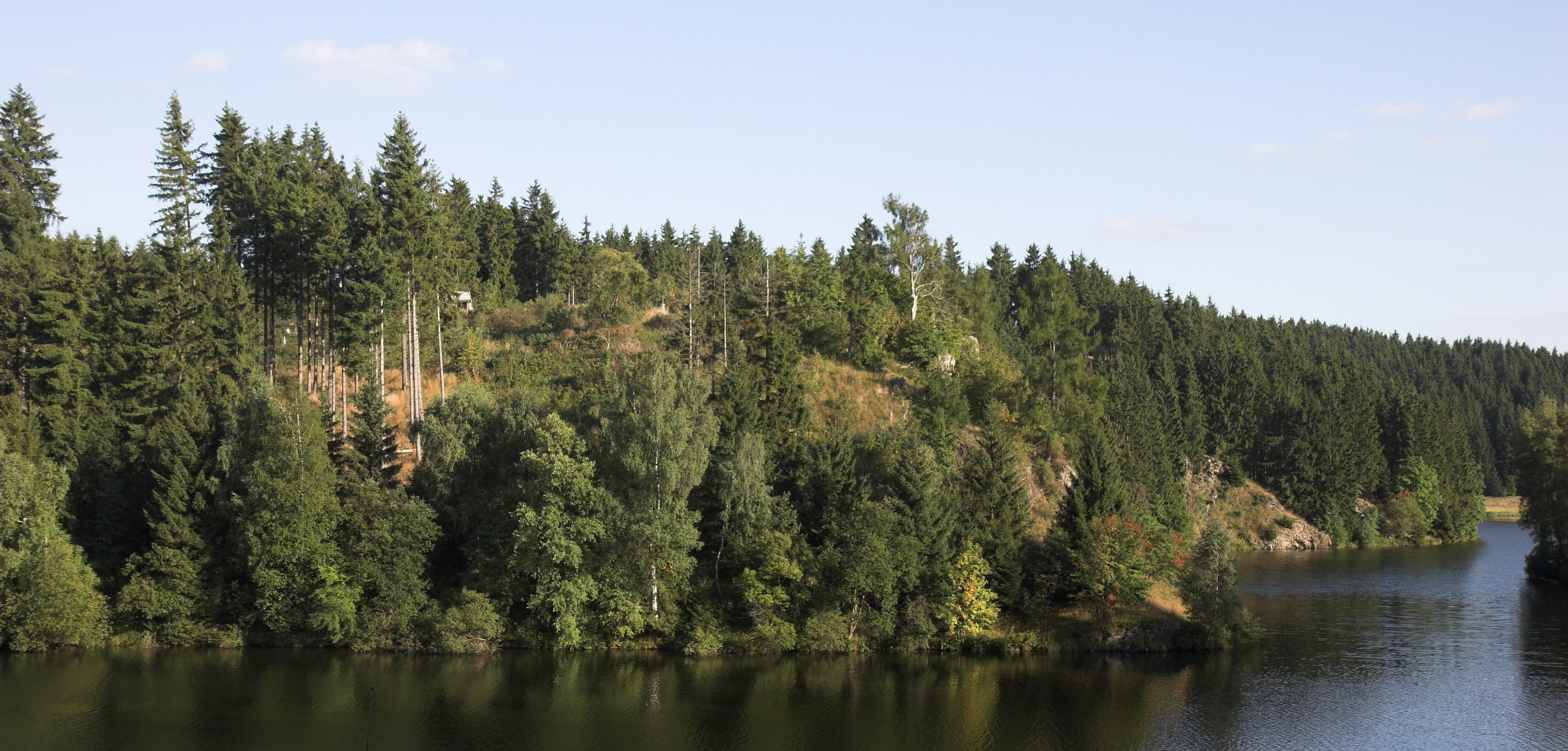
Southern section of the reservoir with the Trageburg rocks on the left-hand side

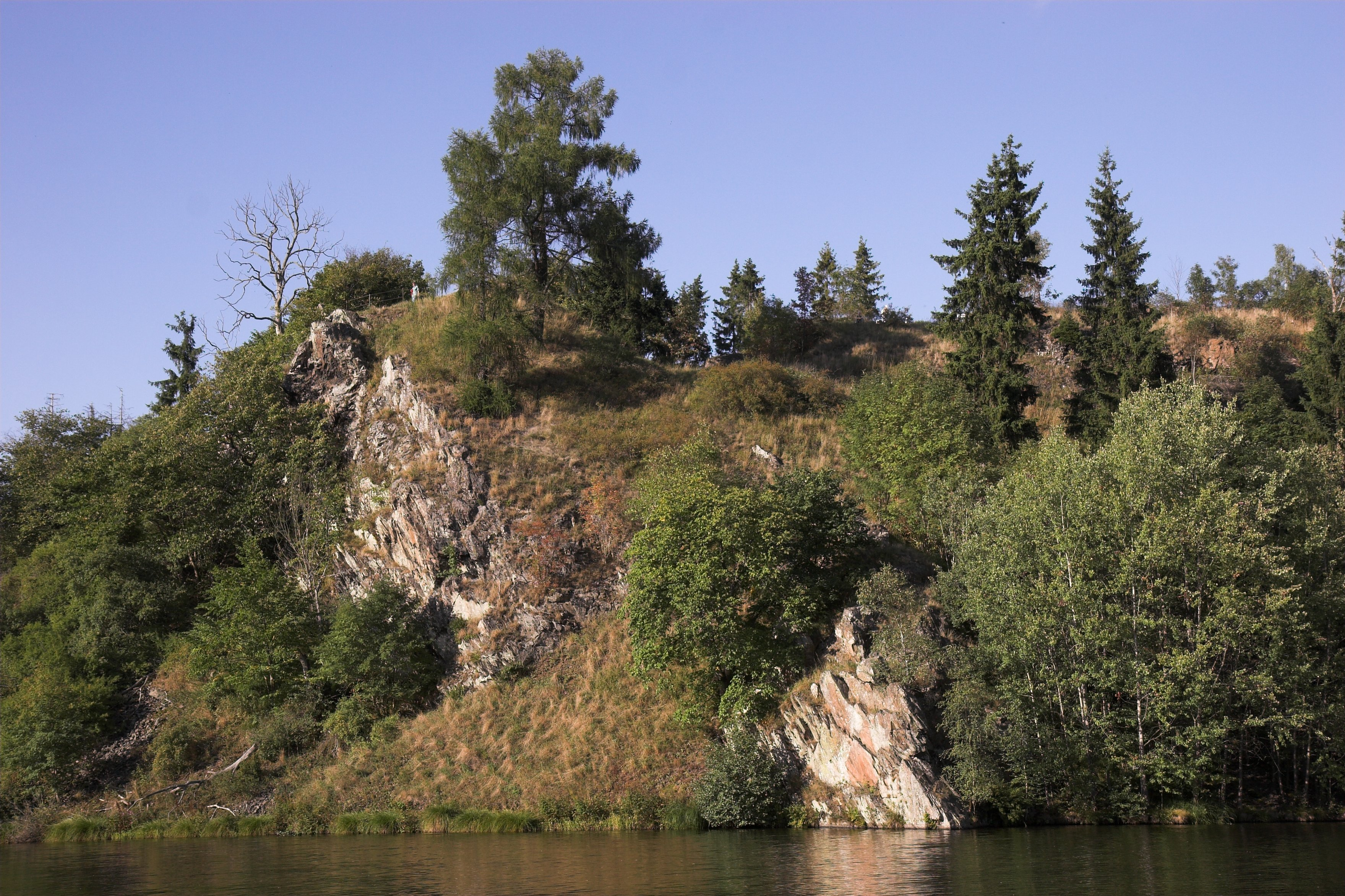
The eastern shore is guarded by crags

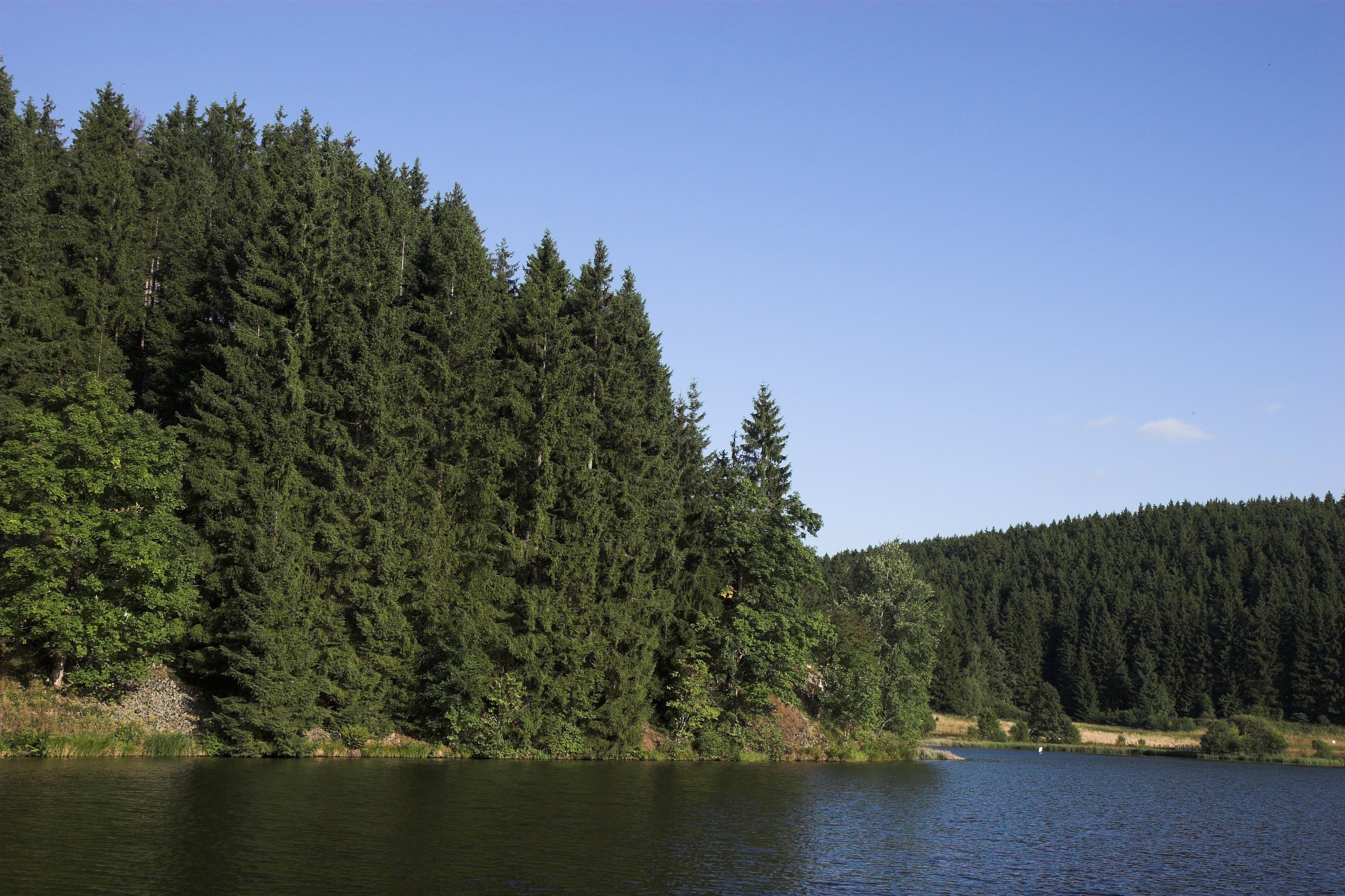
The southern end near Trautenstein

== See also ==
- List of dams in the Harz
- List of reservoirs and dams in Germany
