= Trogfurth Bridge =

Former German historical cultural monument

Coordinates: 51°44′10″N 10°48′17″E

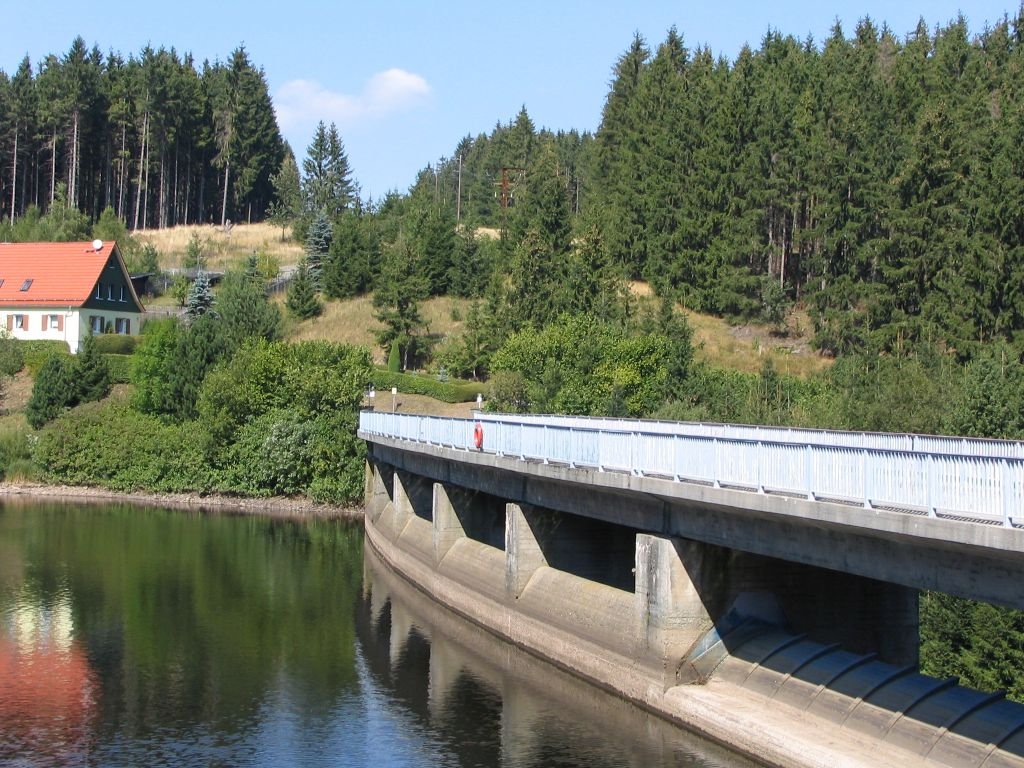
The Trogfurth Bridge is not far from this dam wall

The Trogfurt(h) Bridge (German: Trogfurther Brücke), also called the Great Trogfurt(h) Bridge ((Große) Trogfurt(h)er Brücke) was an historical cultural monument in the Harz Mountains of Germany. It was built in 1739/40 as a stone bridge, blown up in 1945 and that same year replaced by a modern bridge. This became superfluous when the Königshütte Dam was constructed in 1956.

== History ==
The name comes from the Große Trogfurt, which in turn is derived from the Trog-/Tockweg, a road that crossed the River Bode, a tributary of the Saale, and which was mentioned for the first time in 919.

The Trogfurt Bridge was built from rubble stone in the years 1739/40 spanning the Bode at a ford on the Königsstieg ("King's Mountain Road"), which ran from Italy to Scandinavia and was one of the oldest German military and trade routes. The bridge was also used in the transportation of wood from the forest. The bridge stones probably came from the demolished watch tower of the former castle of Susenburg, which stood on a spur about 800 metres north-east of the bridge and probably served to protect the bridge.

On 14 April 1945, just under a month before the end of the Second World War, the bridge was blown up by the SS. In the same year, a modern bridge made of reinforced concrete and wood was built. This became superfluous after the construction of the Königshütte Dam was completed on 24 August 1956, the dam wall standing just a few metres to the east and thus below the old site of the bridge, which is now covered by water. The crown of the 18.2-metre-high dam wall (424.9 m above sea level (NHN)) now acts as the Bode crossing.

== Hiking ==
From the Trogfurth Bridge it is only a few hundred metres to the plateau of the Lange and the ruins of the castles of Königsburg, Trageburg and Susenburg.

The former Trogfurt Bridge (Trogfurter Brücke) is No. 42 in the system of checkpoints in the Harzer Wandernadel hiking network; the checkpoint is located at the southern end of the dam wall. From there is a roughly 6 kilometre long circular walk around the reservoir, taking in the aforementioned plateau and castles.
