= Bundesstraße 81 =

Federal highway in Germany

B 81
- Bundesstraße 81

Route information
- Length: 93 km (58 mi)

Location
- Country: Germany
- States: Saxony-Anhalt, Thuringia

Highway system
- Roads in Germany; Autobahns; List; Federal; List; State; E-roads

The German Bundesstraße 81 (abbreviated to: B81) acts as a main road link between Magdeburg, Halberstadt and Nordhausen.

== Course ==
It begins in the city of Magdeburg in Saxony-Anhalt at the Bundesstraße 71 (Magdeburg Ring). Just before the southern end of Magdeburg is the junction with the A 14 motorway. This is followed by the Langenweddingen ring road. This section was upgraded in the wake of the Langenweddingen train crash, in which 94 people were killed on 6 July 1967.

South of Langenweddingen the B 81 crosses the B 246a, which runs from Wanzleben (West) to Schönebeck (Elbe) (Ost).

In the area of the Egeln ring road the B 180 from Wanzleben joins B 81. As the ring road continues it crosses the River Bode. Following that the B 180 joins from Aschersleben.

The B 81 continues along the Kroppenstedt ring road, built in 2007/2008, and crosses the Bode again as it bypasses the village of Gröningen.

Shortly before Halberstadt it is crossed by the B 245 from Schwanebeck and Eilsleben, in Halberstadt it meets the B 79. The B-81 continues, linking the town of Halberstadt with the North Harz motorway, the B 6n, to the west. As a result, a similar autobahn-like expansion of this road section is one of the broader requirements listed in the Federal Transport Infrastructure Plan (Bundesverkehrswegeplan, BVWP).

The B 81 crosses the B 6n at the Blankenburg-Zentrum junction. In Blankenburg it meets the B 27.

The B 81 continues through the Harz Mountains. About 6 km beyond Blankenburg it passes through the small hamlet of Wendefurth. Below the Wendefurth Reservoir the B 81 crosses the Bode and continues on the Wendefurther Steige to the upper basin of the Wendefurth Power Station.

After a further 7 km the road reaches the climatic spa of Hasselfelde, where it forms a junction with the B 242.

Finally the B 81 crosses the state border between Saxony-Anhalt and Thuringia reaching Netzkater in the borough of Ilfeld, where it ends at a crossroads with the B 4.

== Current situation ==
From its start in Magdeburg to the junction with the B 180 from Aschersleben the B 81 has been widened to four-lanes. Only a roughly 5.5 kilometre long section to Egeln is still two lanes. Currently this section is being widened to four. In the remaining stretch, the ring roads around Kroppenstedt and Gröningen have two lanes. The bypasses around Halberstadt and Blankenburg are a high priority in the current Federal Transport Infrastructure Plan. Currently it is in the planning phase. The ring road around Hasselfelde is a further requirement.

== See also ==
- List of federal roads in Germany
