= Trageburg =

Coordinates: 51°42′24″N 10°47′37″E

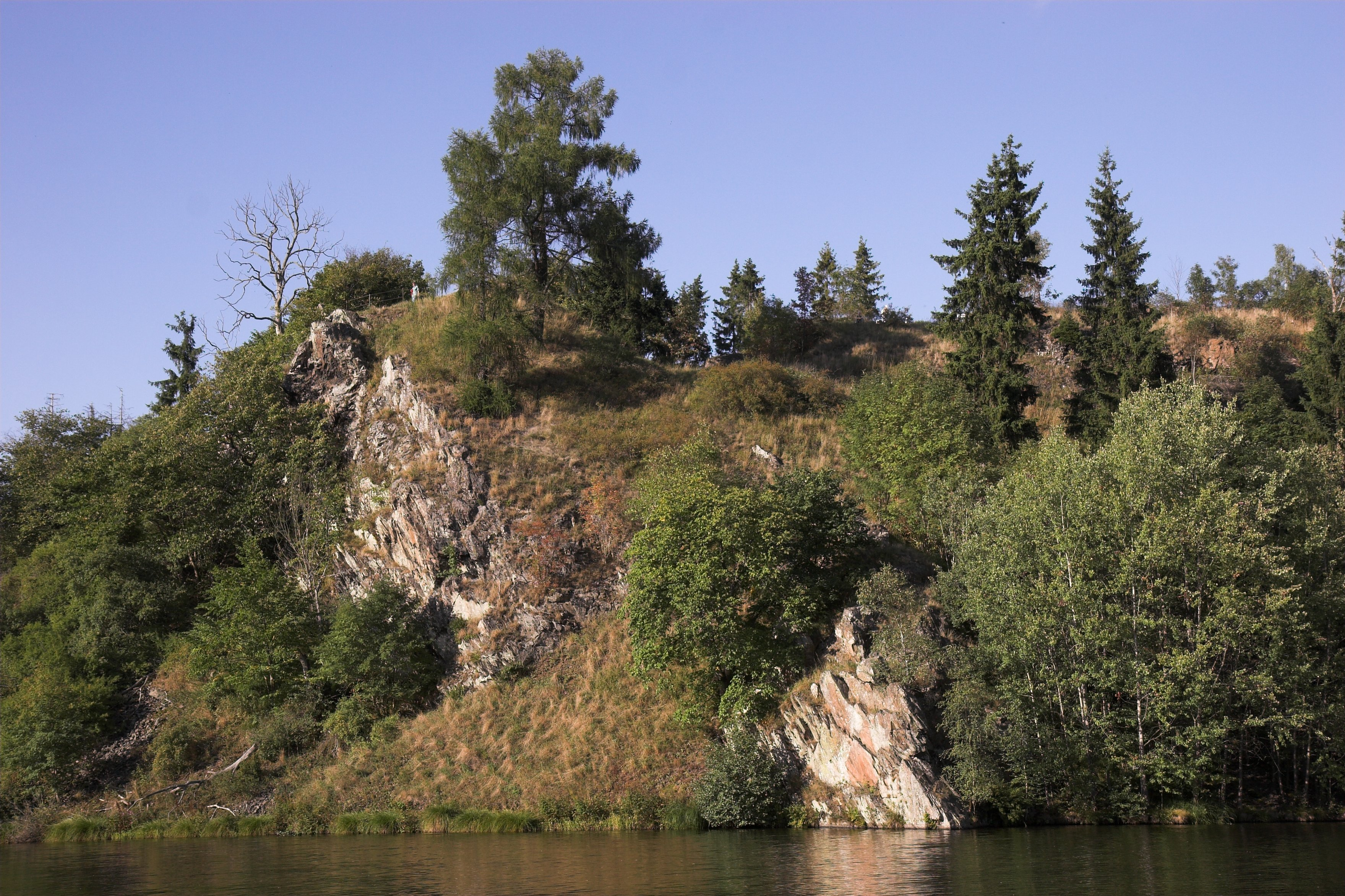
The Trageburg once stood on this rock high above the Rappbode river

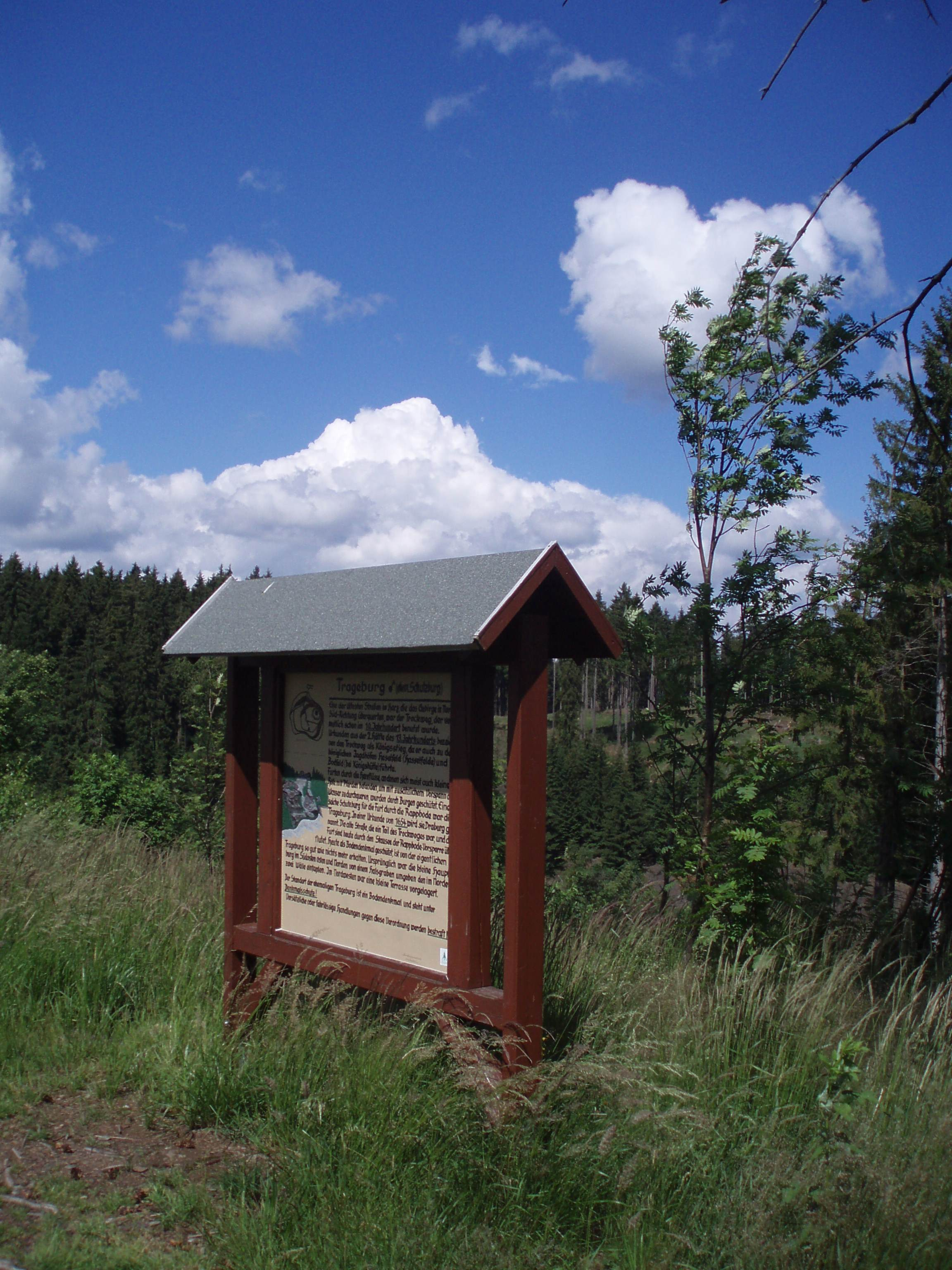
On the Trageburg

The Trageburg is a ruined castle immediately next to the Rappbode Pre-Dam in the Harz Mountains of Germany. It is located near Trautenstein in the district of Harz in Saxony-Anhalt.

Its purpose, like that of the nearby Susenburg, was to protect an old long-distance trade route that ran north–south over the Harz. The Trogfurth Bridge also belonged to this road system.

The Trageburg is checkpoint no. 52 in the Harzer Wandernadel hiking badge system.
