= Böser Kleef =

Coordinates: 51°43′49″N 10°56′57″E

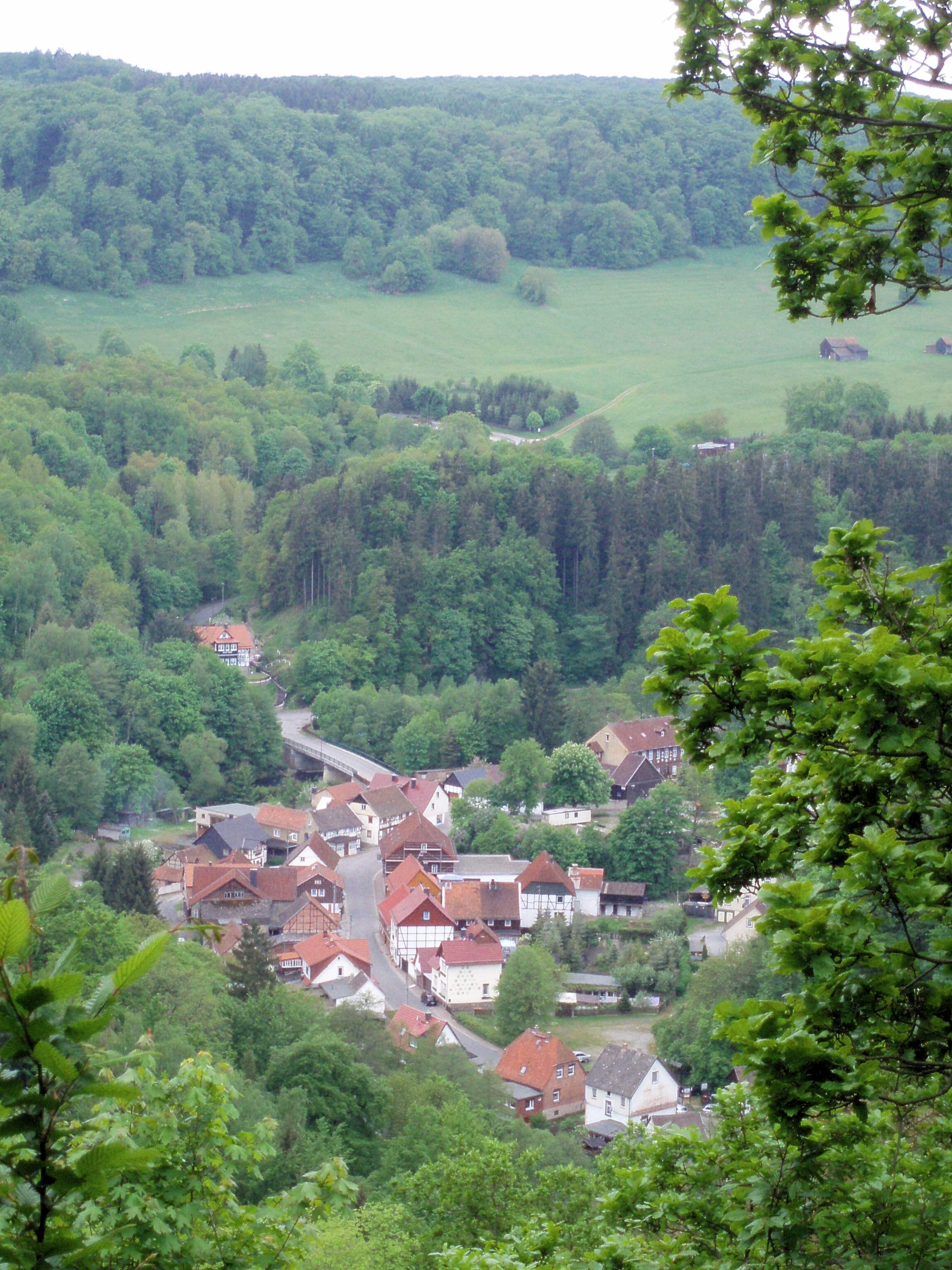
View of Altenbrak from the Böser Kleef

The Böser Kleef is a rock formation, 440 metres above sea level, near the village of Altenbrak in the district of Harz in central Germany. It is made largely of granite.

The Böser Kleef can be reached on foot from several directions including a footpath from Forsthaus Todtenrode. It lies above the Bode valley in woods. In the second half of the 20th century a refuge hut was built at the top. From the crag there are views of Altenbrak and the surrounding woods.

There is also a checkpoint (No. 64) of the Harzer Wandernadel hiking network on the Böser Kleef.

== See also ==
- List of rock formations in the Harz
