= Wendefurth =

Hamlet in Germany

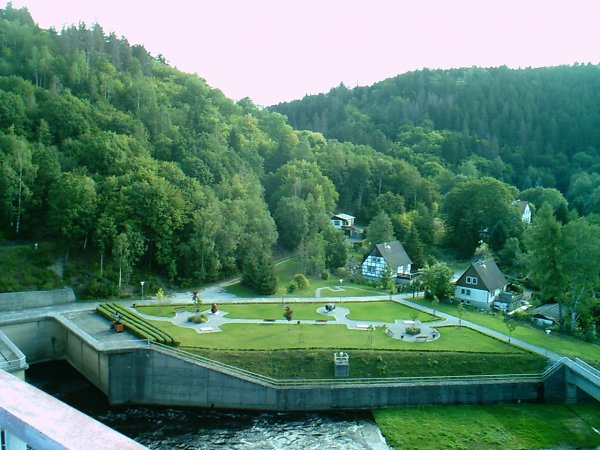
View of the village from the dam

Wendefurth is a hamlet in central Germany that, since 1 July 2009, has been part of the borough of Thale district of Harz. Previously it belonged to the municipality of Altenbrak which was incorporated into Thale.

== Geographical location ==
The hamlet, which consists of just a few houses, lies in the Harz mountains in the deeply incised Bode Gorge on the B 81 federal road and was named after a ford that crossed the River Bode. The Harz Witches' Path (Harzer Hexenstieg) passes nearby.

== Points of interest ==
- Wendefurth Dam
- Wendefurth Power Station

51.7413°N 10.9224°E
