= Wienrode =

- Stadtteil of Blankenburg am Harz
- Coat of arms
- Interactive map of Wienrode
- Location within Germany Location within Saxony-Anhalt
- Coordinates: 51°46′0″N 10°58′24″E
- Country: Germany
- State: Saxony-Anhalt
- District: Harz
- Town: Blankenburg am Harz

Area
  - Total: 13.89 km^{2} (5.36 sq mi)
- Elevation: 233 m (764 ft)

Population (2006-12-31)
  - Total: 896
  - Density: 64.5/km^{2} (167/sq mi)
- Time zone: UTC+01:00 (CET)
  - Summer (DST): UTC+02:00 (CEST)
- Postal codes: 38889
- Dialling codes: 03944
- Vehicle registration: HZ

Wienrode (German pronunciation: [viːnˈʁoːdə]) is a village and a former municipality in the district of Harz, in Saxony-Anhalt, Germany.

Since 1 January 2010, it is part of the town Blankenburg am Harz.
