= Cécile (novel) =

Novel written by F. L. Lucas

- Author: F. L. Lucas
- Genre: Historical novel
- Publisher: Chatto & Windus
- English publication date: 1 May 1930

Cécile is a historical novel by the British writer F. L. Lucas. His second novel, first published in 1930, it is a story of love, society and politics in the France of 1775–1776, set largely in Picardy and Paris, which locations form its two parts.

== Plot summary ==
Cécile, 18, and Andrée, 23, are daughters of the Marquis de Maurepaire of Vraulx Saint-Mein in Picardy. Cécile is a joyous may-fly of a girl, just out of her convent and at once married off by her father, for money, to serious Gabriel de Rieux, 25 ("my heavenly bridegroom"), whom she does not love. Andrée is a young philosophe, romantic about one thing (love), sceptical about all else. She is married to the dashing Gaston, Vicomte de Launay, 30, a proto-Romantic, who makes her miserable by his affair with a fawn-like peasant-girl, whom he swept into his saddle one moonlit evening in the woods. (He is a disciple of Rousseau.) Andrée and Gaston quarrel about this, about their children's education, and about politics. A colleague of Turgot, the reformist Finance Minister, Gaston is shocked by the condition of the rural poor and sets about reforming the estates of his father-in-law and those of his father, the bluff sensible old Comte de Launay – to the mockery and head-shaking of the noblesse and the gratitude of the paysans. The unhappy Andrée is advised by her Parisian aunt, the worldly Madame de Lavaganne, that she must come to Paris and seek distraction. In Paris Andrée frequents her aunt's salon. Cécile meanwhile longs for Paris and for "life". Gabriel, aware that she does not love him and fearing rivals, is reluctant to let her go to the capital. At the château she flirts with her husband's teenage brother, who falls in love with her. Gabriel takes Andrée's advice and gives way. In Paris Cécile takes a lover, the Abbé Maurice d'Ailly, "a pleasant little fox among the vines of Paris". Gaston takes a second mistress, Madame d'Aymery, whose only idea is "to look ravishing and to be ravished". Andrée soon finds out; the discovery kills her love. She learns, too, that Dick Elliot, a young English army officer on convalescent leave, has fallen in love with her:

"I might be a bridge for you away from this unhappiness" [he tells her]. "A bridge may be short, my darling, yet save a whole world of weariness."

On a visit to Saint-Cyr they become lovers. She informs Gaston, who knows he has deserved it. With Turgot fallen, he leaves for America as volunteer in Washington's forces.

Months pass, gay with Parisian pleasures. Gabriel discovers Cécile's affair: when they are riding together in her carriage and the coachman is nodding, her horses stop unbidden outside her lover's front door. Stung by Cécile's hatred of him and his religion, he turns vindictive. He asks her father to apply for a lettre de cachet. One evening at a ball Cécile is arrested de la part du roi [:on behalf of the king]. Maurice deserts her and escapes. Andrée, frantic, knowing that such "disappearances" of women of good family are usually final, confronts Gabriel and asks him to relent. He wavers, looks out of the window, sees Dick waiting in her carriage – and rejects her appeal. She returns to the family château, noticing in passing that without Gaston the estates have gone to rack and ruin, and asks her father to use his influence – only to learn with horror that it was he who ordered the arrest. Telling her father he will never see her again, she rushes out of the château and into the night. Back in Paris Dick fights a duel with Gabriel. Both men are wounded. The authorities try to keep Cécile's identity and movements secret as they transfer her between prisons, but everywhere Madame de Rieux is taken, her looks and charm leave well-wishers, and her ingenuity clues. (She knows her sister will try to find and rescue her.) Andrée and Dick, with the help of their streetwise servants – one of many comic touches in the novel – trace Cécile across France to a convent beyond Nancy. They plan a rescue. Gaston returns from America unexpectedly, disillusioned with the needless bloodshed. He learns that in his absence his father has been killed in a confrontation with poachers. He is just in time to take the wounded Dick's place in the attempt to rescue Cécile. He has at last learnt to value Andrée: but too late – she cannot give up Dick, though Dick has now been recalled to his Regiment in the American War. Gaston requests an audience with King Louis XVI, officially to give a first-hand account of events in America and to advise against French intervention, but privately to appeal for the release of Cécile. In a memorable scene, Vergennes escorts Gaston to Versailles. The American information is welcomed by Louis, who had regretted the fall of Turgot; the private appeal falls on deaf ears. In her incarceration Cécile learns from the Mother Superior that it was her father who ordered her arrest. Stunned, she attempts to escape alone that night. She is fatally injured in a fall. Gaston and Andrée, unaware, arrive just hours too late. Getting no response from her window they break into the nunnery and find the community in mourning for Cécile, who has won the hearts of the nuns in her brief time with them. Brushing past a distraught Gabriel, also just arrived, they start back for Paris in the desolation of a grey dawn.

== Background ==
The pain of marital break-up looms large in the novel, which was written in the aftermath of Lucas's failed marriage to E. B. C. Jones, to which passages indirectly refer, as Lucas's friends noticed. "I can see that in writing Cécile you were, in a sense, clearing up your own history," wrote T. E. Lawrence to Lucas in 1930.

"You seemed intolerably dear to lose" [Gaston tells Andrée on his return from America], "now that I had lost you; and in the shadow of that loss our differences seemed pitiful things, compared with all that we had in common. For, after all, we both cared for courage and freedom and generosity and pity... Why should our disagreements have mattered?"

The French 18th century, its history and literature, its philosophes and encyclopédistes, its salon hostesses and letter-writers, was one Lucas knew through and through. He shared the Bloomsbury conviction that European civilisation had reached a high point (for all its shortcomings) in the Siècle des Lumières, and in particular in the brilliant French women that had graced it. Lucas returned to the 18th century French setting in his short story 'Madame de Malitourn's Cold' (1936) about an estranged aristocratic couple, each unfaithful to the other, but brought together again by a comic misunderstanding. Cécile was the first of three novels and one novella Lucas set in the period 1775–1812.

Lucas entered the novel for Chatto & Windus's Historical Novel Competition, announced in the press in January 1928, with manuscripts to be submitted by June 1929. The judges were E. M. Forster, George Gordon and R. H. Mottram. That the conscientious Forster was a friend of Lucas's may have counted against Cécile, which was bracketed for Second Prize, to the puzzlement of some reviewers who thought it finer than the winning novel, Margaret Irwin's None So Pretty (1930).

== Themes ==
As a novel about the ruling classes in the decade before the Revolution, Cécile is in part a work of social criticism, not unrelated to the 1920s, as some reviewers noted, with intimations of the coming deluge. In parallel, the American Revolution reaches its climax in the months covered by the novel, touching the lives of a number of the characters and deeply impressing European onlookers. The struggle for freedom is thus explored on both individual and social levels. Cécile, in addition, contrasts the attitudes of the generations, examines various views of love, and, like Lucas's later novels Doctor Dido (1938) and The English Agent (1969), traces the tension between 18th-century rationalism and, in varying forms, Romantic "enthusiasm" and unreason. Rousseau's ideas are presented unsympathetically, as they are in Doctor Dido. Lucas saw Rousseau as a harmful influence, undermining the balance and good sense achieved in the Age of Enlightenment.

== Reception ==
Cécile was the best received of Lucas's novels. The New Statesman described it as a "tenderly brilliant story". "For grace and style and insight into character," wrote Kathleen Tomlinson in The Nation and Athenaeum, "Cécile is reminiscent of Gautier's Mademoiselle de Maupin. Only reminiscent, for Mr Lucas has a more profound philosophy, or wisdom, and is not content with the challenge and interplay of the individual, but extends his psychological understanding to classes and nations." "His extraordinary gift for delightful persiflage," noted the New York Bookman, "contributes not a little towards making this novel almost as dix-huitième in spirit as Manon Lescaut is in fact." Vita Sackville-West also praised the novel: "It seemed to me to be full of the deepest and truest feeling," she wrote, "never sentimental, but always convincing and extremely moving. The relationship between Andrée and Gaston is admirably true to nature. No-one could fail to be moved by this picture of a woman struggling against her own love for a husband who disappoints and betrays her at every turn." Lucas dedicated Cécile to T. E. Lawrence, who admired his poetry and who had said encouraging things about his first novel, The River Flows (1926). Lawrence, in a letter to Lucas thanking him for the dedication, singled out "that picture of the King, and Vergennes and Gaston, near the end. That is magnificent. You got there as near to the reality of a royal audience as anyone could."

Some reviewers thought the novel "rather static", Naomi Mitchison noting that, though "lucid and distinguished" as a work of art, there was not enough action to make the novel "a selling success". Opinion differed on the long salon scenes, The Spectator considering that they "would of themselves be enough to stamp the book with distinction", Basil Davenport in the Saturday Review of Literature that "though the talk is extraordinarily good, some readers will feel there is too much of it" and a distraction from the "excellent" plot.

== Publishing history ==
The novel was published on 1 May 1930 by Chatto & Windus of London, and reprinted in Chatto's 'Centaur Library' in July of that year and again in November 1931. The first American edition, by Henry Holt and Company of New York, 1930, was, unusually for Lucas's US editions, re-set.
