= Königshütte Dam =

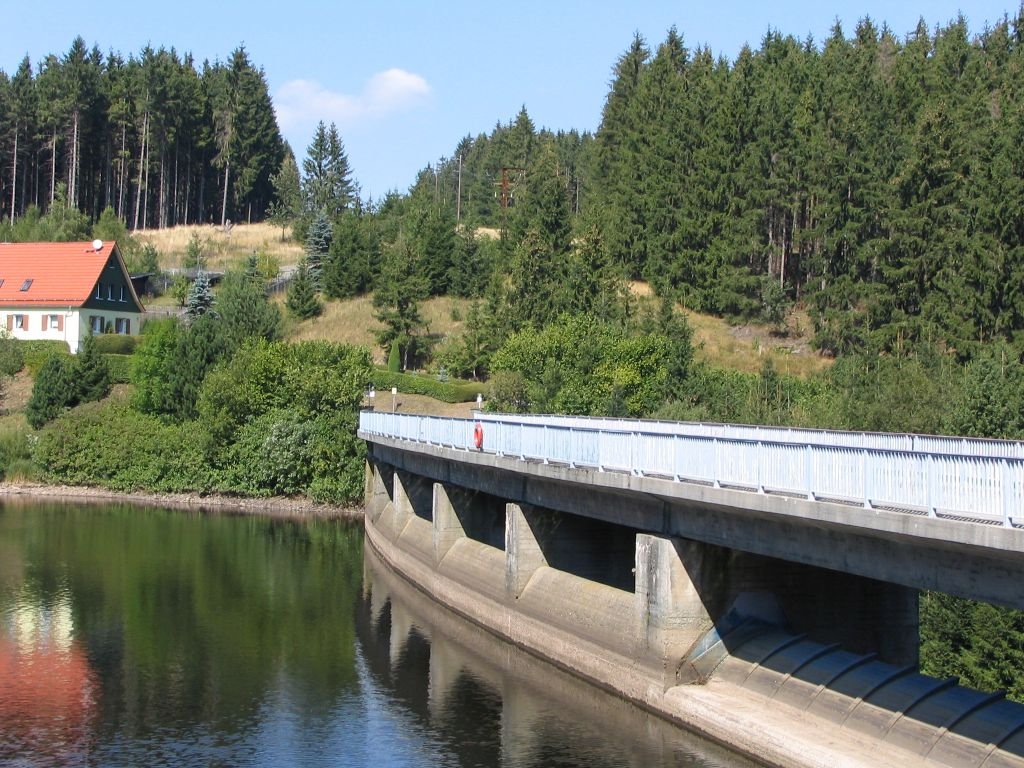
- Interactive map of Königshütte Dam
- Location: Harz county
- Coordinates: 51°44′19″N 10°47′36″E
- Construction began: 1952
- Opening date: 1956

Dam and spillways
- Height: 18.2 m (60 ft)
- Length: 108 m (354 ft)
- Width (crest): 7 m
- Dam volume: 13,500 m³
- Spillway capacity: 258.7 m³/s

Reservoir
- Total capacity: 1.45 million m³
- Catchment area: 154.2 km^{2}
- Surface area: 32 ha

The Königshütte Dam (German: Talsperre Königshütte) is a dam in the German state of Saxony-Anhalt in the Harz mountains. It impounds the River Bode and lies between Königshütte and Susenburg (both in the borough of Oberharz am Brocken). It is a so-called storage reservoir (Überleitungssperre) forming part of the Rappbode Dam system.

The dam itself was built on the Bode from 1939 to 1943 and 1952–1956 with construction being interrupted by the war. It is an 18 metre high gravity dam, made of concrete, for the supply of drinking water and for flood protection. It also provides reserves of water during times of drought and hydro-electric power. The power station has a nominal output of 60 kW and generates 0.18 GWh per annum.

The gently curving dam wall is 108 m long and has a volume of 13,500 m³. It can be overtopped along almost its entire length. In one section there is a fish-belly flap gate that can be lowered by 1.5 metres to provide flood control.

The reservoir has a capacity of 1.2 million m³ and covers an area of 32 hectares. Part of the water is diverted from here through a 1,795 m long tunnel to the Rappbode Reservoir. The rest flows back into the Bode and down to the Wendefurth Reservoir, where it is reunited with the water from the Rappbode Reservoir.

A quiet concrete road from Königshütte runs along the northern side of the reservoir as far as the dam. On the south side a wide footpath leads back to Königshütte, which passes the confluence of the Kalte and Warme Bode. Numerous footpaths lead from the dam in almost all directions of the compass. The location is suitable for both anglers, hikers and walkers.

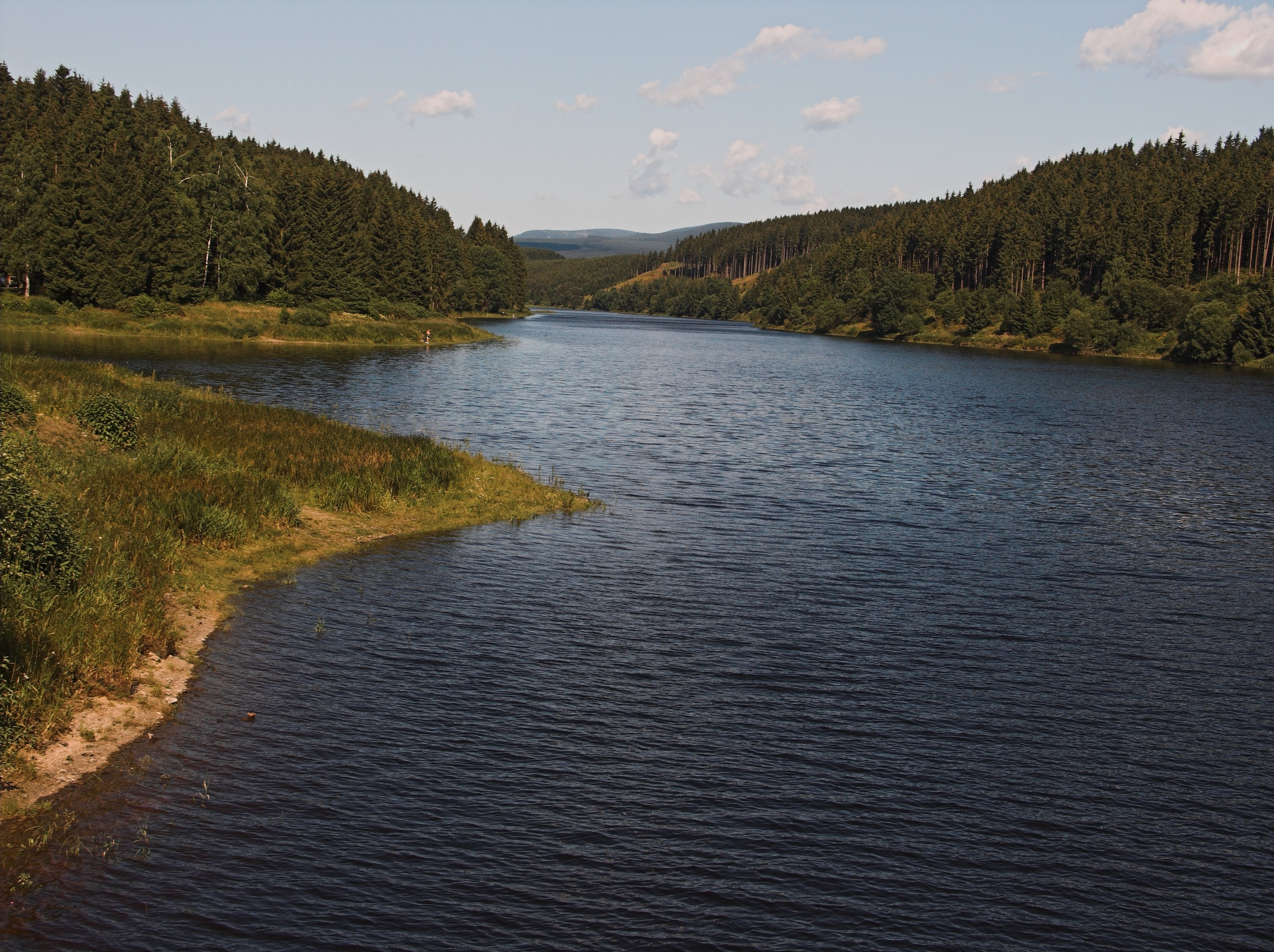
Western section

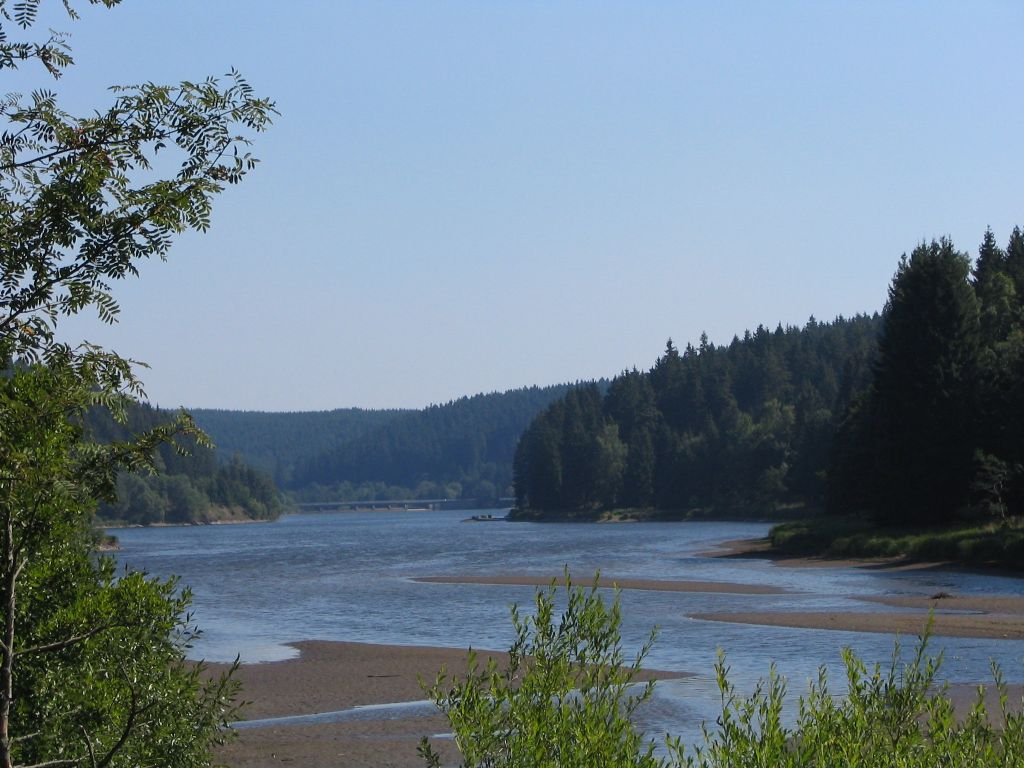
Approach from Königshütte

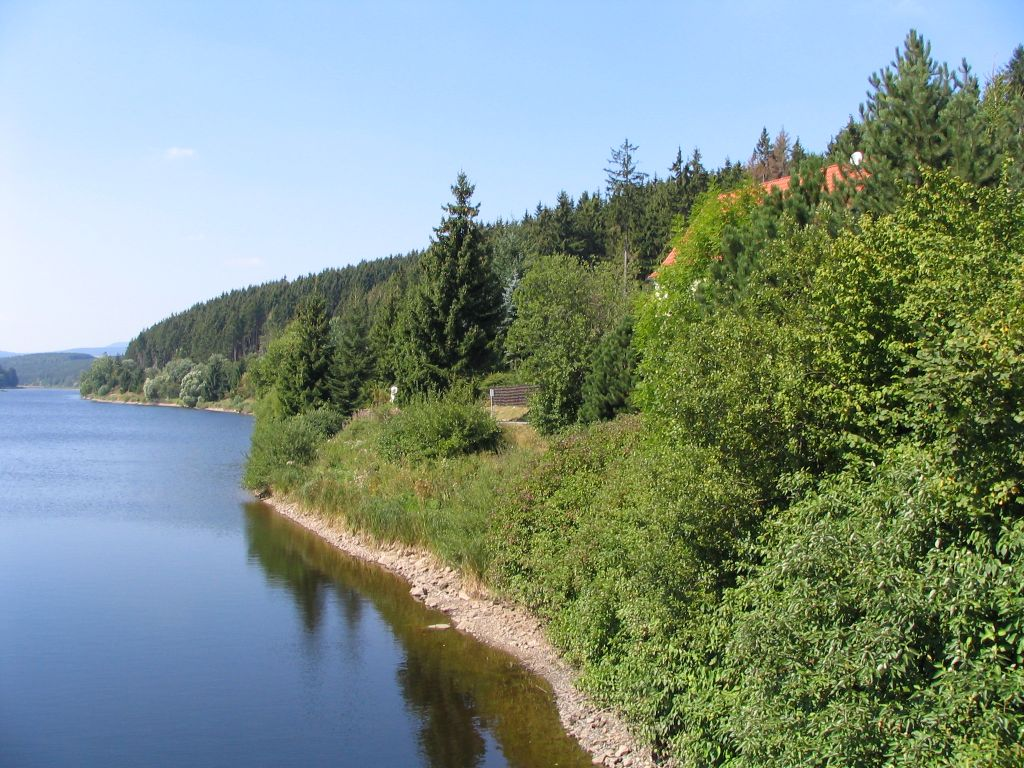
North side

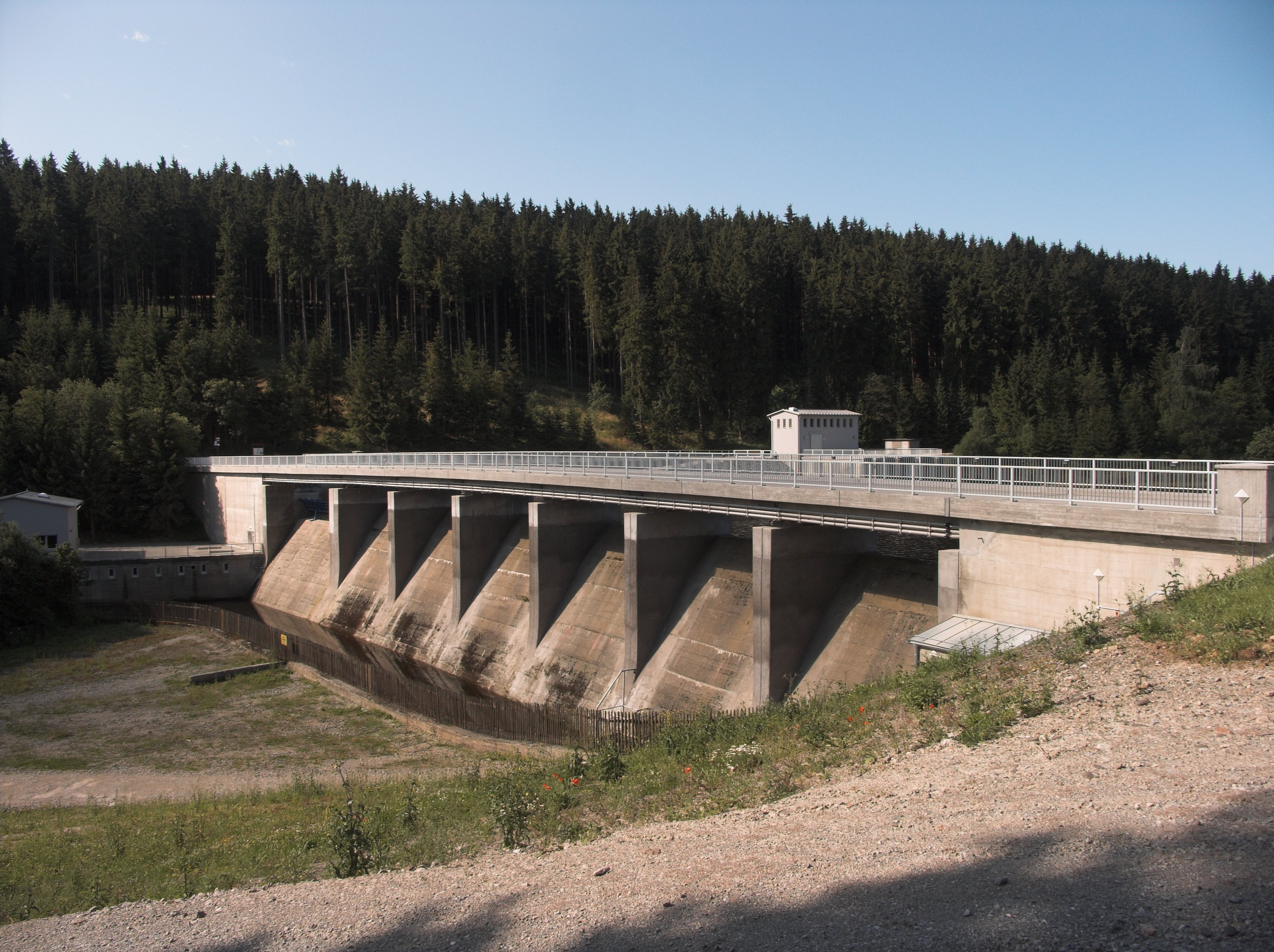
East side of the dam

== See also ==
- List of reservoirs and dams in Germany
- List of dams in the Harz
