= Wendefurth Power Station =

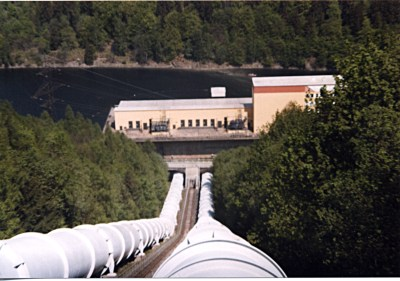
- Penstocks above the Wendefurth Power Station
- Official name: Pumpspeicherwerk Wendefurth
- Country: Germany
- Location: Wendefurth
- Coordinates: 51°44′20″N 10°54′25″E
- Status: Operational
- Construction began: 1960
- Opening date: 1967
- Operator(s): Vattenfall (Germany)

Upper reservoir
- Total capacity: 2.0×10^{6} m^{3} (2.0 hm^{3})

Lower reservoir
- Total capacity: 8.5×10^{6} m^{3} (8.5 hm^{3})

Power Station
- Hydraulic head: 126 m
- Pump-generators: 2 x 40 MW
- Installed capacity: 80 MW
- Capacity factor: 13.0%
- Annual generation: 91 GW·h

Wendefurth Power Station (German: Pumpspeicherwerk Wendefurth) is a pumped-storage hydroelectric power station on the reservoir of the Wendefurth Dam near Wendefurth in the Harz mountains of central Germany.

The power station has an upper reservoir on the mountain top which stores the water. The two penstocks have a diameter of 3.4 metres (11 ft). The two installed Francis pump turbines can deliver 80 MW. As of 2012 the plant has since its commissioning in 1967 produced 4,105 GWh electricity, corresponding to an average annual production of 91 GWh.

== Gallery ==
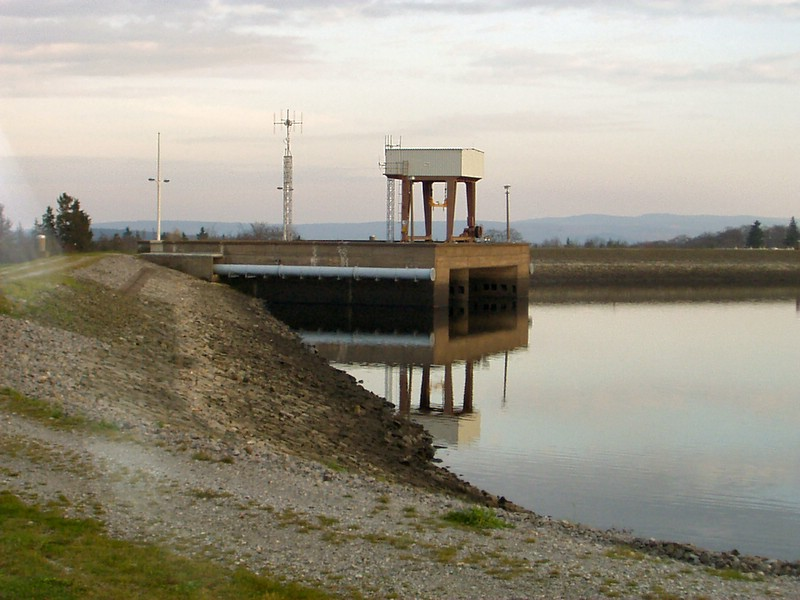
View over the upper basin

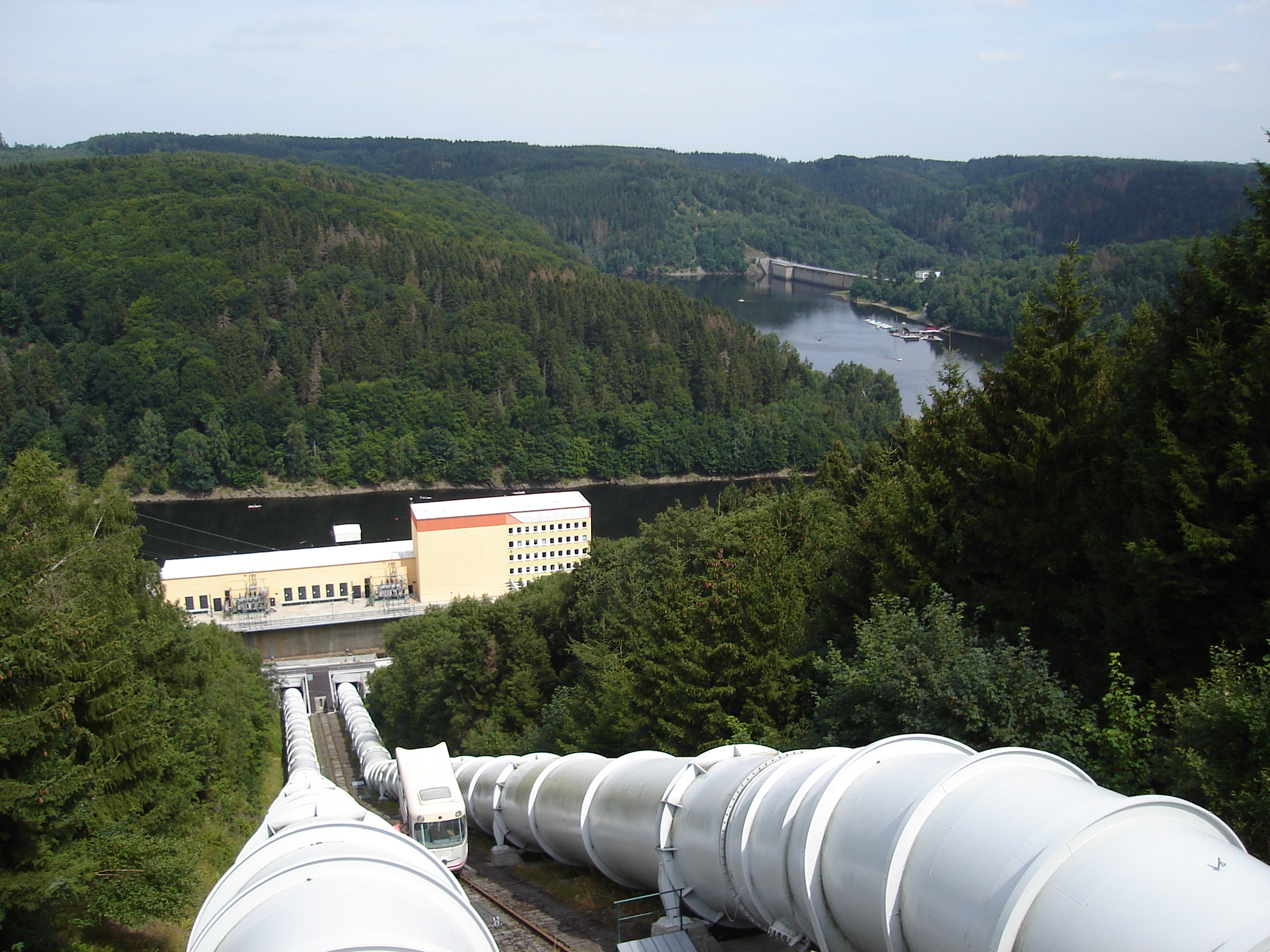
Penstocks

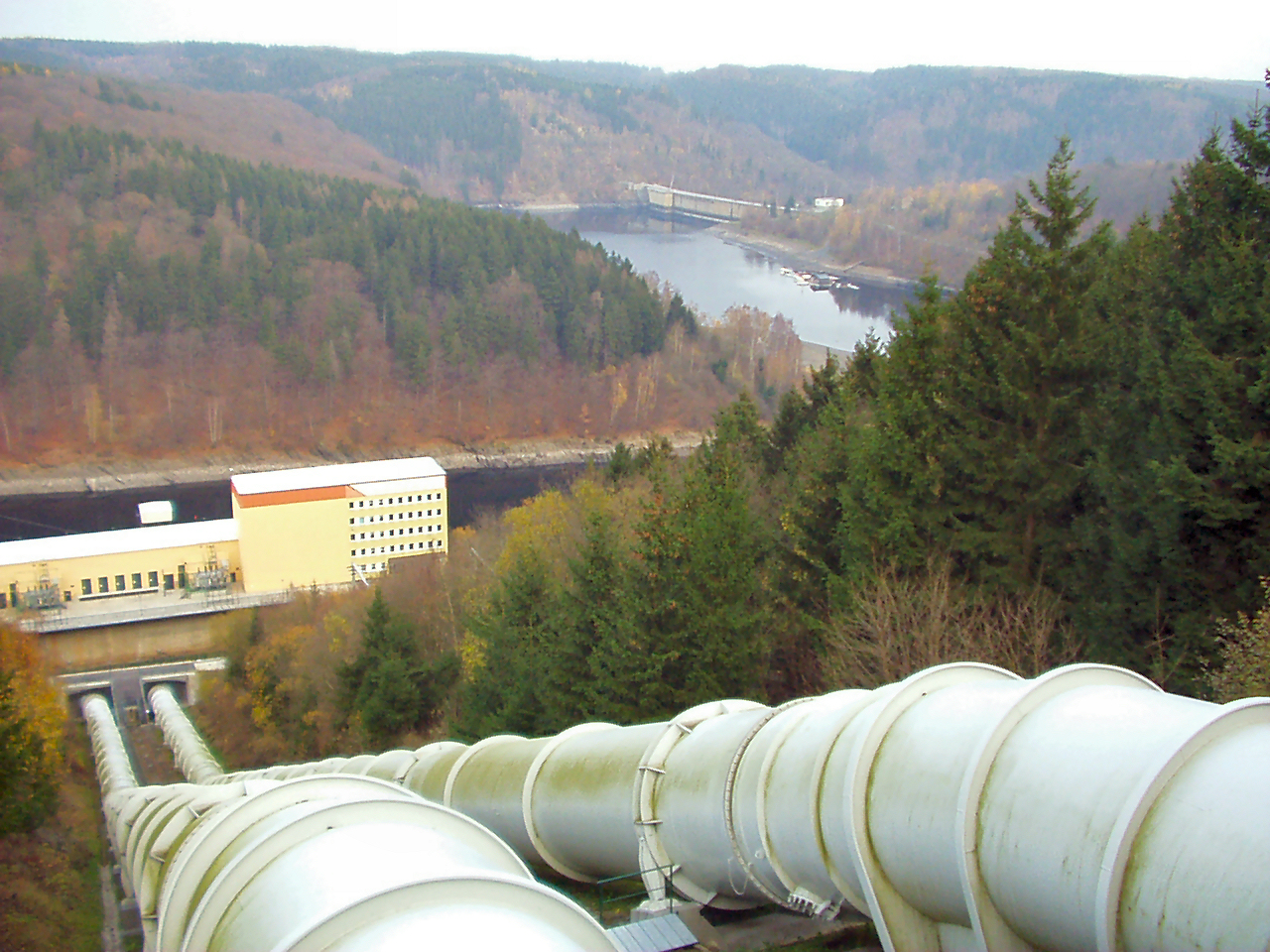
Penstocks

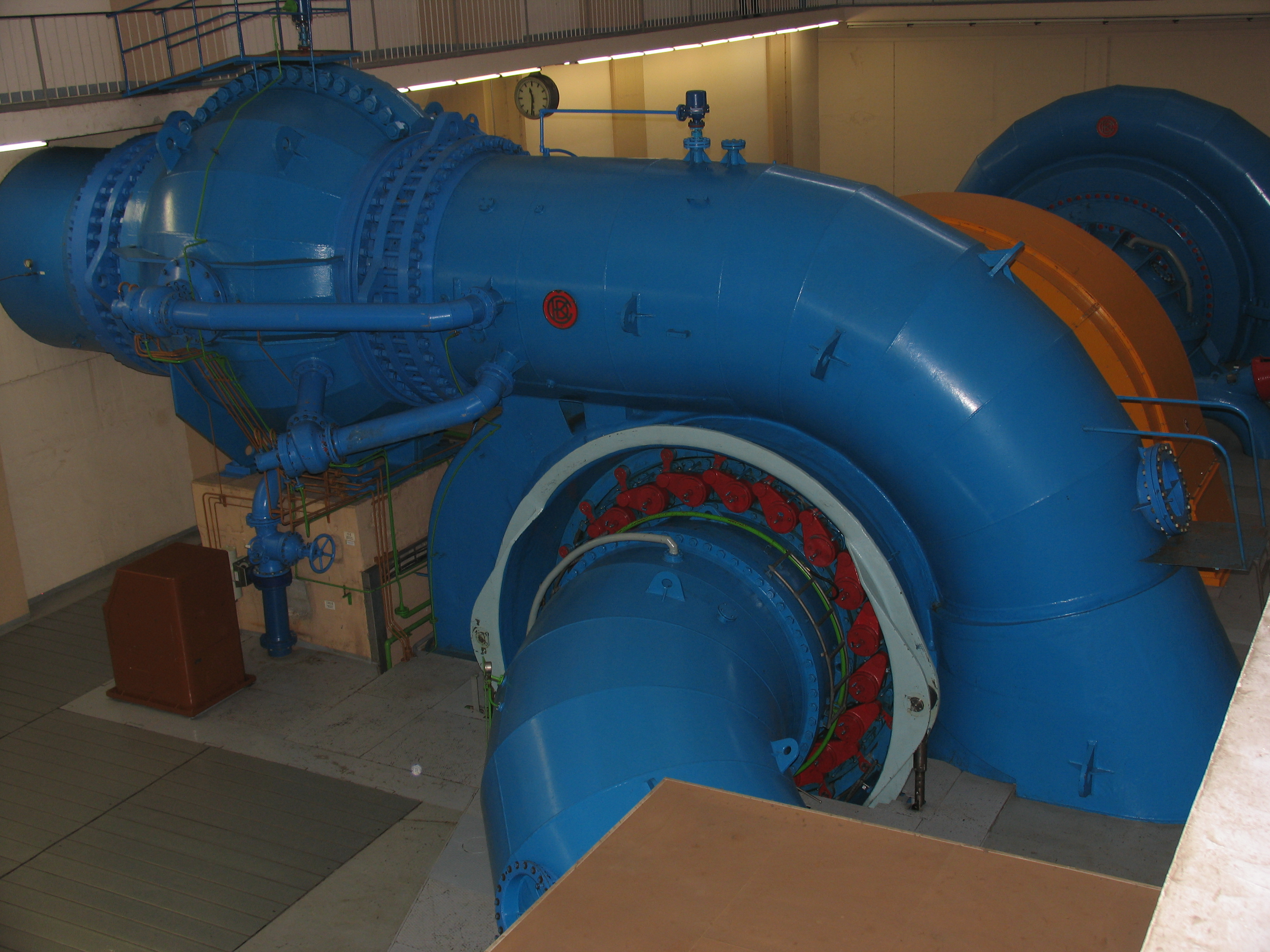
Turbine hall

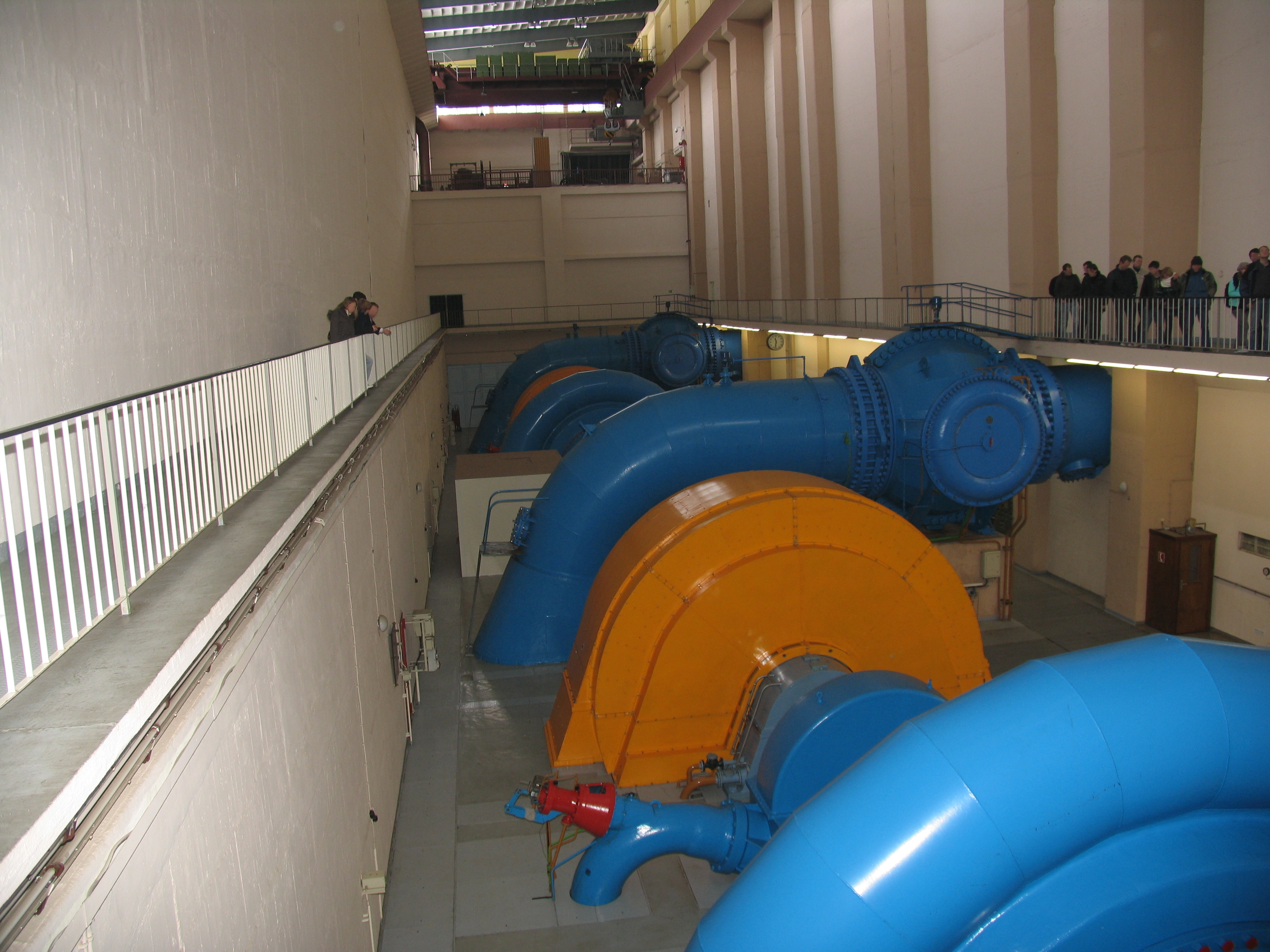
Turbine hall

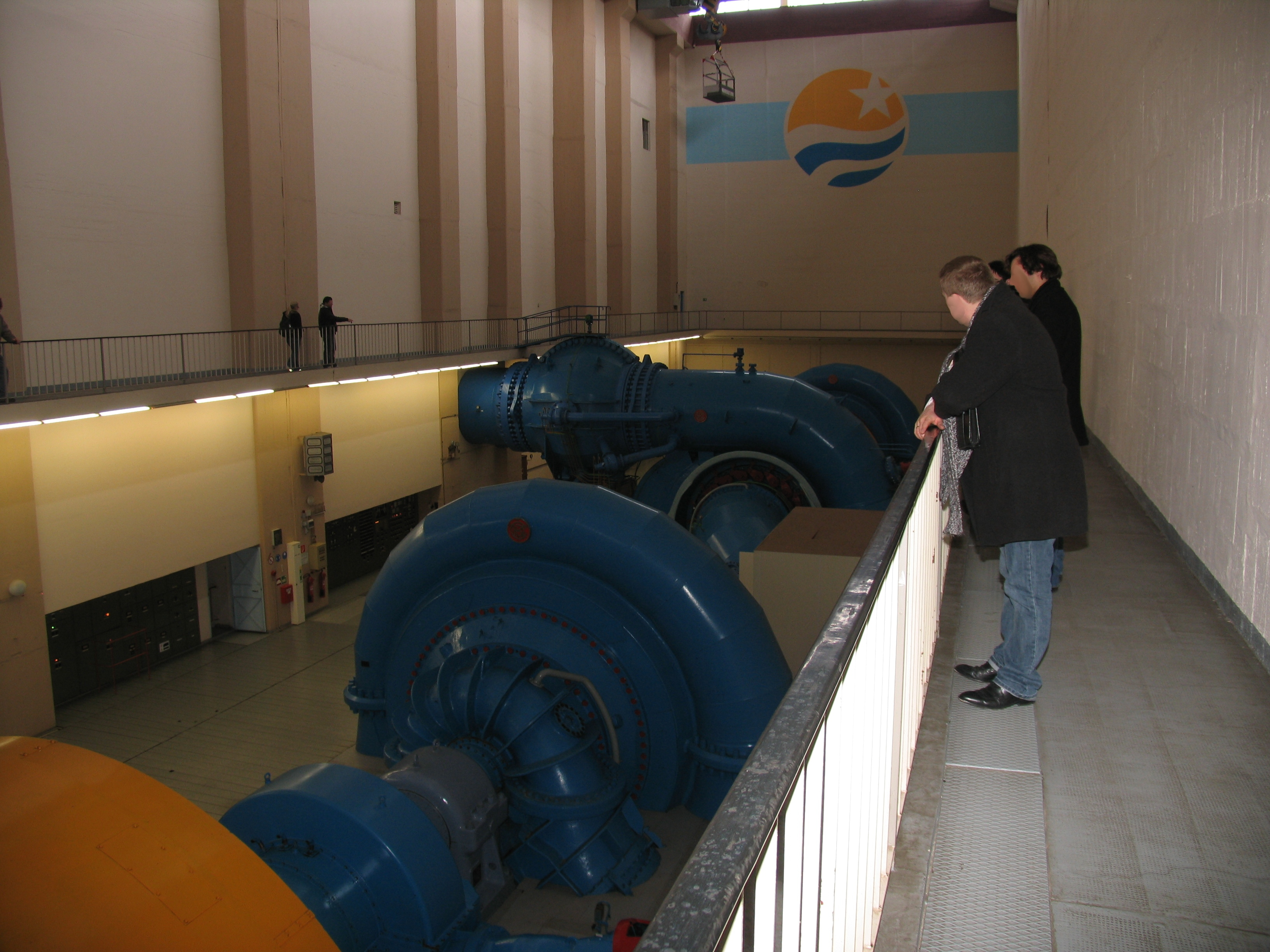
Turbine hall

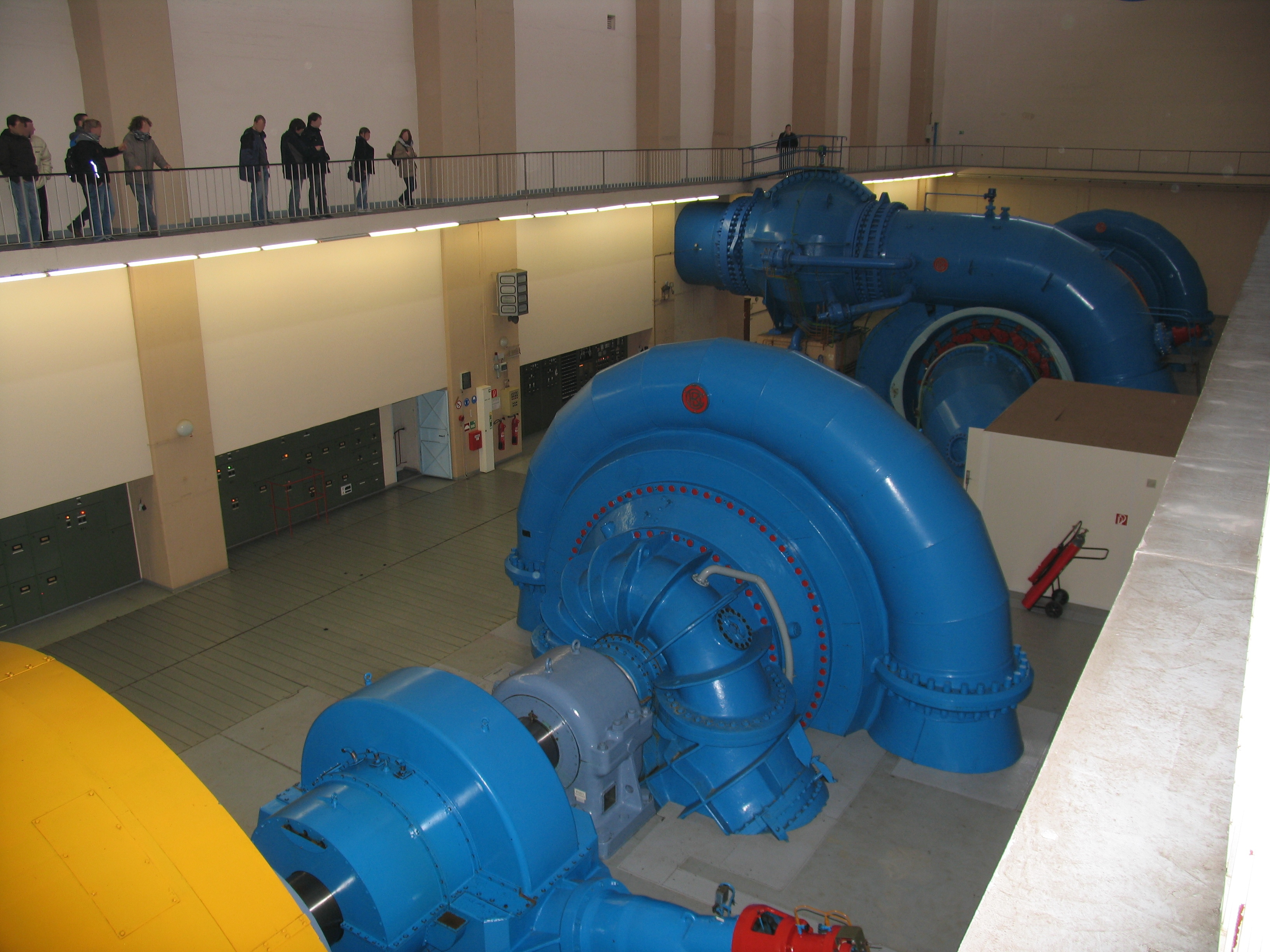
Turbine hall
