= Cattenstedt =

Village in Saxony-Anhalt, Germany

- Ortsteil of Blankenburg am Harz
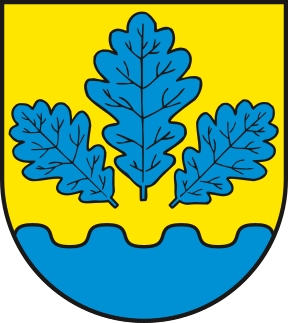
- Coat of arms
- Interactive map of Cattenstedt
- Location within Germany Location within Saxony-Anhalt
- Coordinates: 51°46′33″N 10°58′1″E
- Country: Germany
- State: Saxony-Anhalt
- District: Harz
- Town: Blankenburg am Harz

Area
  - Total: 8.01 km^{2} (3.09 sq mi)
- Elevation: 242 m (794 ft)

Population (2006-12-31)
  - Total: 720
  - Density: 90/km^{2} (230/sq mi)
- Time zone: UTC+01:00 (CET)
  - Summer (DST): UTC+02:00 (CEST)
- Postal codes: 38889
- Dialling codes: 03944
- Vehicle registration: HZ
- Website: www.blankenburg.de

Cattenstedt (German pronunciation: [ˈkatn̩ʃtɛt]) is a village and a former municipality in the district of Harz, in Saxony-Anhalt, Germany.

Since 1 January 2010, it is part of the town Blankenburg am Harz.
