= Wendefurth Dam =

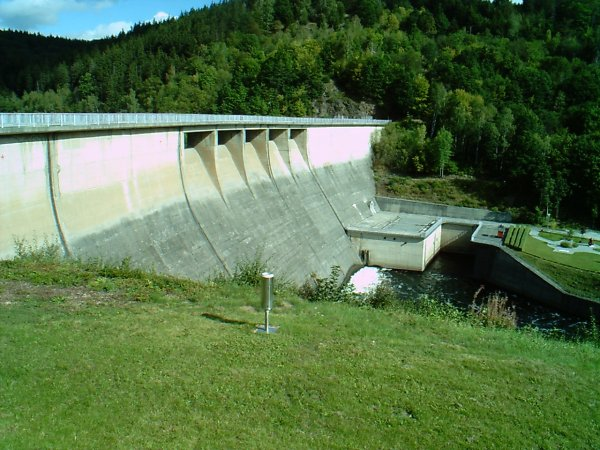
- Interactive map of Wendefurth Dam
- Country: Germany
- Location: Harz
- Coordinates: 51°44′19″N 10°54′46″E
- Construction began: 1957
- Opening date: 1966

Dam and spillways
- Height: 43.5 m (143 ft)
- Length: 230 m (250 yd)
- Width (crest): 3 m (9.8 ft)
- Dam volume: 115,000 m^{3} (93 acre⋅ft)
- Spillway capacity: 191.7 m^{3}/s (6,770 cu ft/s)

Reservoir
- Total capacity: 9,220,000 m^{3} (7,470 acre⋅ft)
- Catchment area: 309.20 km^{2} (119.38 sq mi)
- Surface area: 78 ha (190 acres)

The Wendefurth Dam (German: Talsperre Wendefurth) near Wendefurth in the Harz, Germany, is one of the dams downstream of the Rappbode Dam, that provides flood protection as well as impounding the River Bode to provide the lower reservoir for the Wendefurth Power Station. In addition it is a bathing lake and also supports fish farming.

== Dam wall ==
The actual dam is a 43.5 m (143 ft) high gravity dam made of 16 segments that is 30 m (98 ft) above the valley floor and 3 metres (9.8 ft) wide at the crest. The individual segments of the dam are sealed on the upstream side with copper sheets set into the concrete. In addition the joints are sealed with tar and hemp. The flexure of the individual segments under water pressure is constantly monitored. By means of pendulums suspended on the dam wall the degree of flex can be measures. The movement of segments relative to one another is also under constant observation. The wall has several galleries for inspection purposes. Two bottom outlets have been installed at the base. The huge annular piston valves can deliver up to 75 m^{3}/s (2,600 cu ft/s) of water. It is currently being investigated whether the water outflow can be used for energy purposes.

The bedrock consists of manganese slate that is not particularly watertight. So that the dam wall is not lifted up from underneath by water pressure at the base, the pressure at the foot is relieved by over 40 bubble caps (Glocken) with drainage pipes (Steigleitungen). The building water pressure is measured at intervals. By means of the observation well, the long term condition of the mountain is investigated.

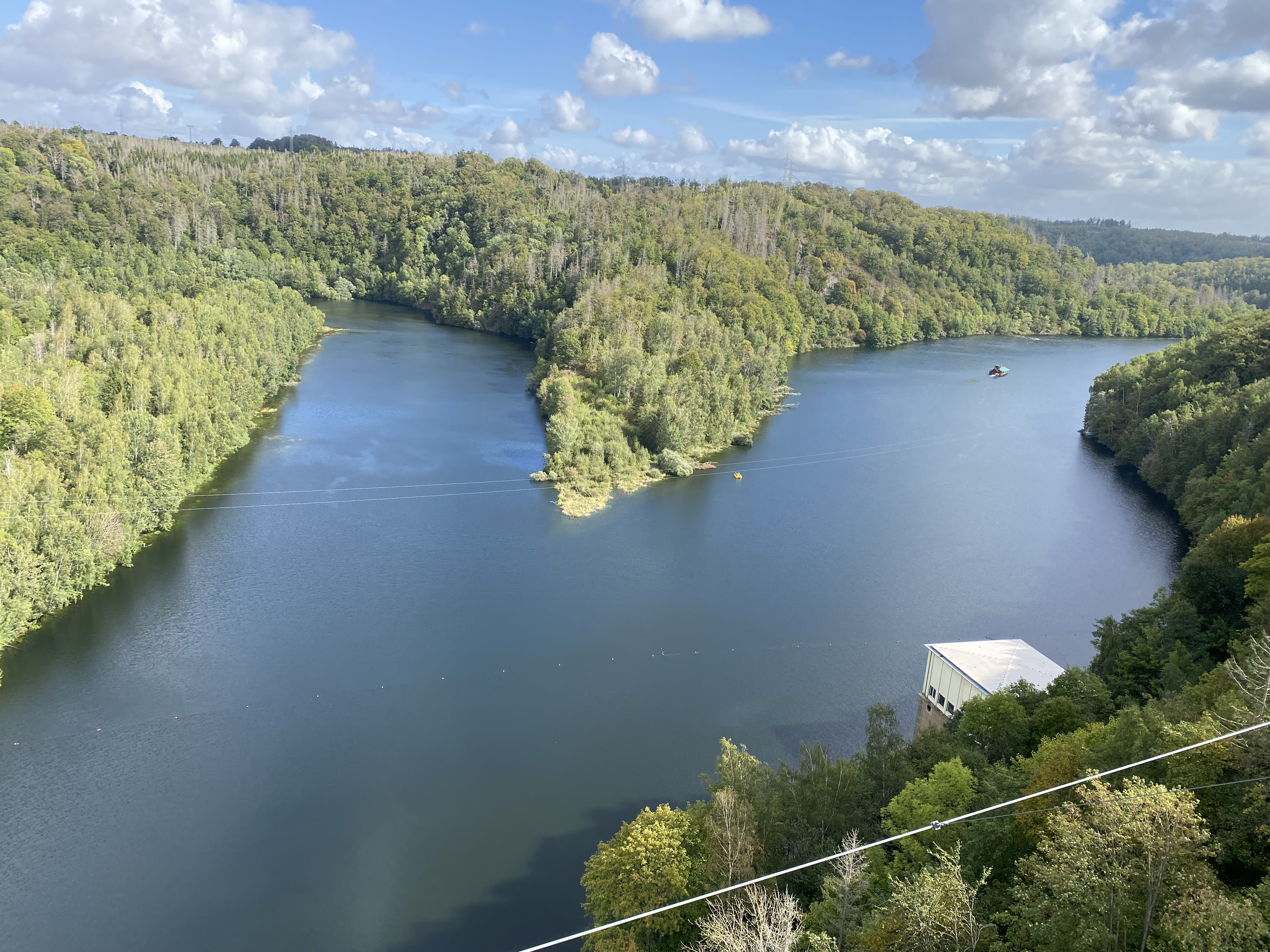
View from the adjacent dam wall of the Rappbode Dam.

The operator, the Saxony-Anhalt Dam Company (Talsperrenbetrieb Sachsen-Anhalt), has made the Wendefurth Dam accessible to visitors. In an adjacent engineering park, old dam components are given a final use.

There is a good viewing point over the dam and reservoir at Talsperrenblick on the hillside beyond the eastern end of the reservoir, accessible on footpaths from Wendefurth. It is checkpoint 62 in the Harzer Wandernadel hiking system.

== See also ==
- List of dams in the Harz
- List of reservoirs and dams in Germany

== Sources ==
- Talsperren in Sachsen-Anhalt. Talsperrenmeisterei des Landes Sachsen-Anhalt, 1994
