= Carmen de bello Saxonico =

Latin epic poem

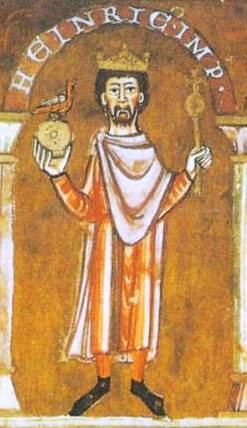
Henry IV, Holy Roman Emperor

The Carmen de bello Saxonico (German: Lied vom Sachsenkrieg; English: Song of the Saxon War) is a Latin epic in 757 hexameters divided between three books that recounts the first phase of the Saxon Rebellion against the Emperor Henry IV that began in 1073. Its account is limited geographically to the Harz region and ends with the Battle of Spier in October 1075. It is strongly pro-imperial in tone, and complements the pro-Saxon histories of Bruno the Saxon and Lambert of Hersfeld. It was composed within months of the events it describes, but the only existing manuscript copy dates from the sixteenth century. G. H. Pertz published a first critical edition in 1851.

The anonymous author made use of several classical writers, including Virgil, Horace, Lucan, Ovid and Sedulius. He also had access to Venantius Fortunatus and the unnamed Poeta Saxo, and had connections in the imperial court. Lampert of Hersfeld was once proposed as its author, but this suggestion was quickly dispelled. Today, it is commonly thought that the same anonymous poet composed the Vita Heinrici IV imperatoris, a biography of Henry IV written some three decades later. His familiarity with local geography hints that he may have been a royalist Saxon, like the Poeta Saxo of two centuries earlier.
