= Road to Canossa =

Ritual submission of Henry IV

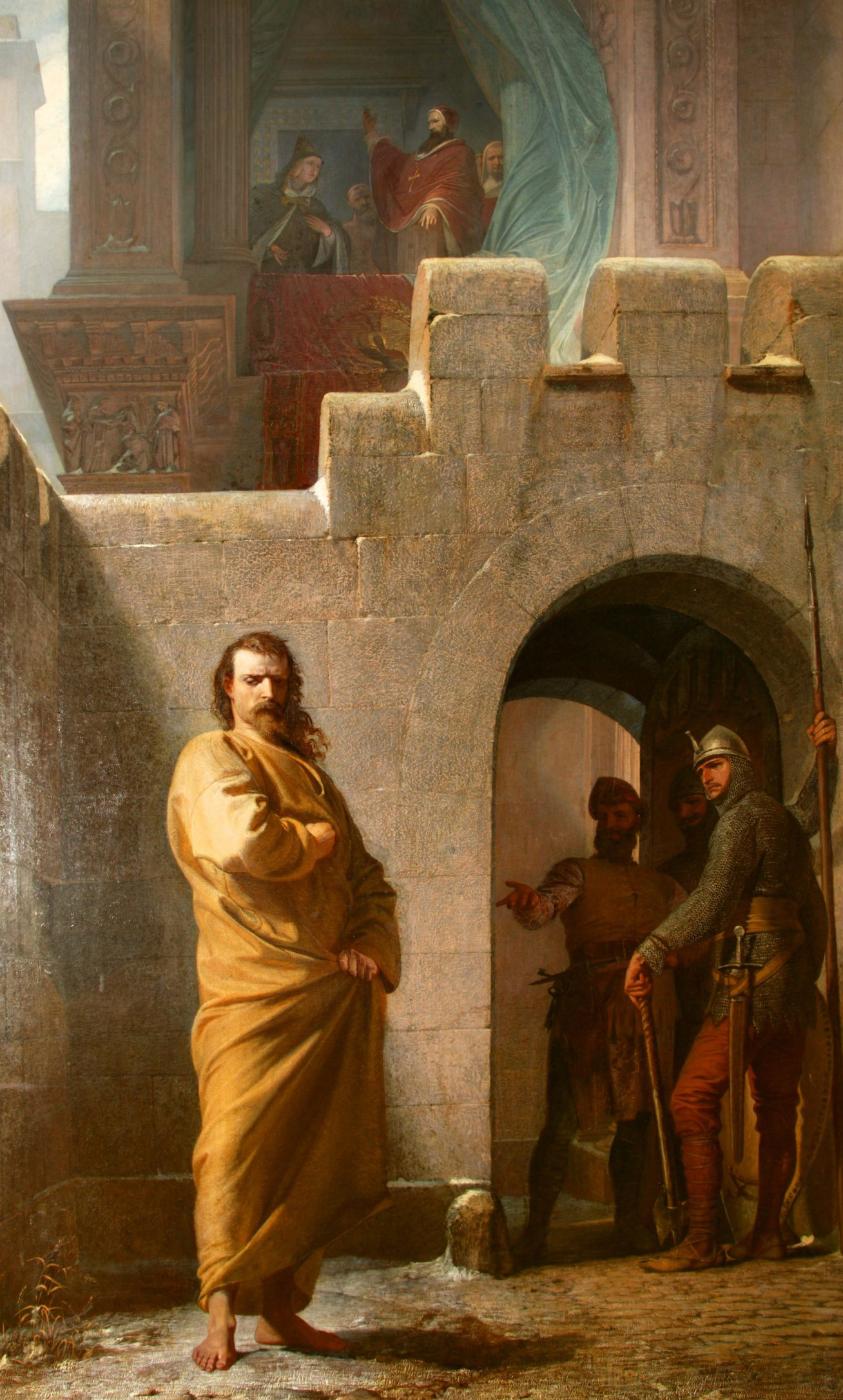
Henry at Canossa, history painting by Eduard Schwoiser (1862)

The Road to Canossa or Humiliation of Canossa (Italian: L'umiliazione di Canossa), or, sometimes, the Walk to Canossa (German: Gang nach Canossa/Kanossa) was the journey of the Holy Roman Emperor Henry IV to Canossa Castle in 1077, and his subsequent ritual submission there to Pope Gregory VII. It took place during the Investiture controversy and involved the Emperor seeking absolution and the revocation of his excommunication by the Pope who had been staying at the castle as the guest of Margravine Matilda of Tuscany.

According to contemporary sources, he was forced to supplicate on his knees, waiting for three days and nights before the castle gate while a blizzard raged, "one of the most dramatic moments of the Middle Ages". The episode has spurred much debate among medieval chroniclers as well as modern historians, who dispute whether the walk was a humiliating defeat for the emperor or a "brilliant masterstroke".

== Historical background ==
The Pope and the Holy Roman Emperor had disputed the relative precedence of ecclesiastical and secular power since the spread of the Gregorian Reforms in the 11th century. When Gregory VII, acclaimed Pope by the people of Rome in 1073, attempted to enact reforms to the investiture process by his Dictatus papae decree, he was met by resistance from Henry IV. The king insisted that he reserve the traditionally established right of previous emperors to "invest" bishops, abbots and other clergymen, despite the papal decree.

The conflict became increasingly severe, after Henry had been able to suppress the Saxon Rebellion in the Battle of Langensalza in June 1075. In September he installed a new Bishop of Milan, which annoyed Gregory, who openly required obedience. Shortly afterwards the Pope was attacked while leading the 1075 Christmas celebrations and taken to jail by a mob. The next day his followers mobbed the prison and brought him back to the church, where he picked up Mass where he had left off. On 24 January 1076, Henry assembled several German bishops in a synod at Worms, where the ecclesiastical dignitaries abandoned all commitments to the Pope. The king finally demanded Gregory's abdication, referring to the rules of papal election according to the In nomine Domini bull of 1059.

In response, Gregory excommunicated and deposed Henry in the Lenten synod of 1076 at Rome. He stated furthermore that, one year from that day, the loss of kingship would become irrevocable.

== Journey ==
Henry asks Matilda and Abbot Hugh of Cluny to intervene in the dispute, Vita Mathildis (c. 1115).

Gregory had also declared the oaths of allegiance sworn by the Princes null and void, which turned out to be more dangerous to Henry's rule, as the development met the interests of several territorial rulers in the Empire. When in October the Patriarch of Aquileia and the papal legate met with German princes at Trebur, they swore an oath not to recognize Henry unless the ban was lifted within a year. Fearing further rebellion among the German aristocracy, Henry felt he had to get rid of his excommunication. He was still popular among the common people, but the princes were threatening to elect a new king. He had to secure his position in the church before the rapidly approaching deadline given by the pope.

On the suggestion of his advisers, he arranged to meet with the Pope, who had set out along the path across the Alps towards Augsburg. Henry commenced his trip in Speyer and, travelling southward up the Rhine, he found his position precarious. As the Swabian nobles refused to open the way to the Alpine passes, the king had to move through Burgundy and cross the Alps at steep Mont Cenis. According to the chronicles by Lambert of Hersfeld, Henry, his wife Bertha of Savoy, and their young son Conrad risked their lives by crossing the Alpine crest in harsh mid-winter conditions. After a long journey, they reached Gregory's accommodation in Canossa on 25 January 1077.

== At the castle ==
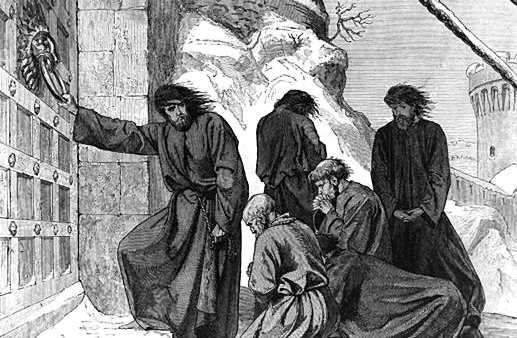
Henry IV and his entourage at the gate, 19th century depiction

When Henry reached Matilda's castle, the Pope ordered that he be refused entry. Waiting at the gates, Henry took on the behavior of penance. He wore a hair-shirt, the traditional clothing of monks at the time, and allegedly walked barefoot. Many of his entourage, including the queen Bertha of Savoy and the prince Conrad, also supposedly removed their shoes. According to Lambert of Hersfeld and first-hand accounts of the scene (letters written by both Gregory and Henry in the following years), the king waited by the gate for three full days. Throughout this time, he allegedly wore only his penitent hair-shirt and fasted.

Finally, on 28 January, the castle gates were opened for Henry and he was allowed to enter. Contemporary accounts report that he knelt before Pope Gregory and begged his forgiveness. Gregory absolved Henry and invited him back into the Church. That evening, Gregory, Henry, and Matilda of Tuscany shared communion in the chapel of Sant'Apollonio inside the castle, signaling the official end of Henry's excommunication.

Whether Henry actually did formal repentance has not been conclusively established. In any case, he regained his freedom to act and quickly returned to Germany, while Gregory remained with Matilda at the castle and in other locations in Tuscany for several months.

== Historical impact ==
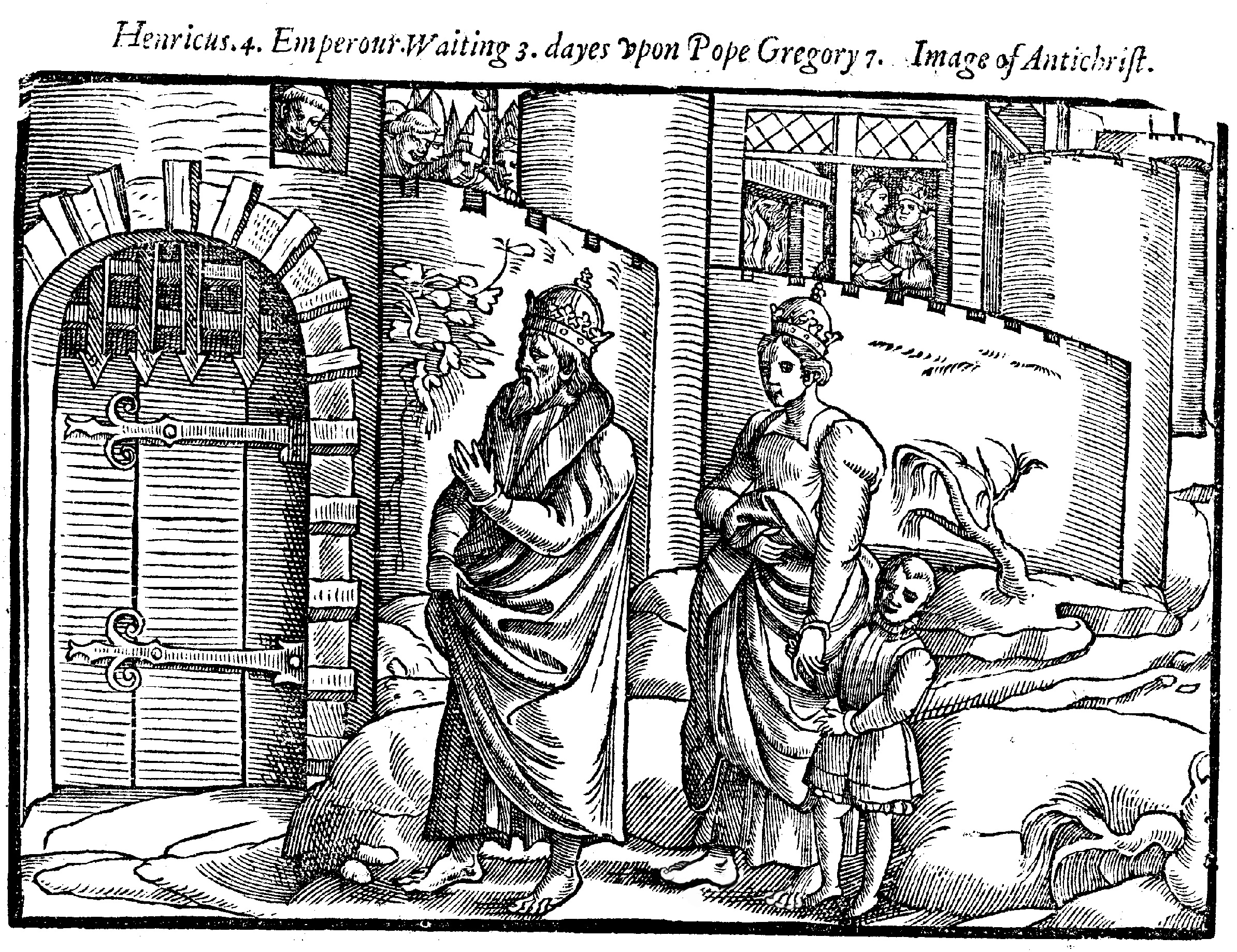
A 1583 image of Henry at Canossa, by English Protestant John Foxe. The print depicts Henry as a dignified ruler, contrasted with Gregory's contemptuous supporters and Gregory himself, identified as Antichrist, who is depicted in the wiles of Matilda.

The immediate effects of the Canossa meeting were limited. Although Henry was restored to the Church, any expectations that the Pope would restore support of Henry's right to the throne were soon dashed; in March, a small group of powerful Saxon and South German territorial magnates, including the archbishops of Salzburg, Mainz and Magdeburg and several bishops, met at Forchheim and, on the assumption that Henry had irretrievably lost the imperial dignity, repudiated the Salian dynasty's claim to pass the imperial crown by heredity and, in the words of Bruno of Merseburg, present in his bishop's entourage, declared that "the son of a king, even if he should be preeminently worthy, should become king by a spontaneous election". The Pope confirmed the agreement. His deposition still in effect, Henry was forced into civil war with Duke Rudolph of Swabia. Gregory levied a second excommunication against Henry, who ultimately won the civil war, invaded Rome, and forced Gregory to flee, replacing him with Antipope Clement III.

In 1728, when Gregory was canonized by Pope Benedict XIII, the papal decree caused offence among European monarchs and its publication was banned by Emperor Charles VI.

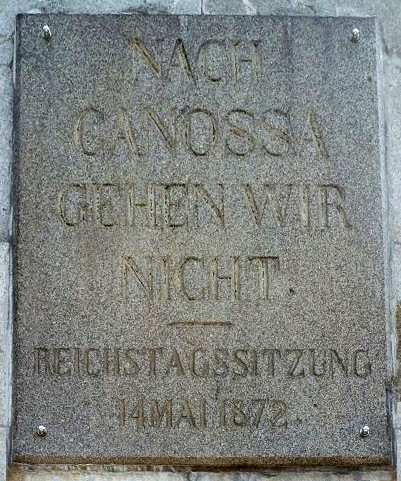
Plaque with Bismarck's quote erected in 1877 at Harzburg Castle

Later in history, the event took on a more secular meaning: the rejection of its example came to stand for Germany's refusal to be subjected to any outside power (although still especially, but not exclusively, the Catholic Church). The incident first was perpetuated by the Austrian politician and poet Anton Alexander von Auersperg (Anastasius Grün) in an 1868 speech before the House of Lords on the implementation of civil marriage. After German unification, Chancellor Otto von Bismarck, when his Pulpit Paragraph and the Jesuits Law sparked the so-called "Kulturkampf" with Pope Pius IX, assured his countrymen in a Reichstag speech that "We will not go to Canossa–neither in body nor in spirit!" This meant that Germany would stand for itself and not abide any outside interference in its politics, religion or culture.

== Modern usage ==
In modern usage, "going to Canossa" refers to an act of penance or submission. To "go to Canossa" is an expression that describes doing penance, often with the connotation that it is unwilling or coerced. For example, Adolf Hitler used the expression to describe his meetings with Bavarian Minister President Heinrich Held after being released from Landsberg Prison in 1924, in his bid to have the ban on the Nazi Party lifted. In 1938 Sir Robert Vansittart called Prime Minister Neville Chamberlain's meeting with Hitler at Berchtesgaden "like Henry IV going to Canossa all over again."

The equivalent of the expression "go to Canossa" exists in German (Gang nach Canossa), Dutch (gaan naar Canossa), Danish, Norwegian, and Swedish (Canossavandring, Kanossagang or Kanossagång), Finnish (ryömiä Kanossaan), French (aller à Canossa), Hungarian (kanosszajárás), Italian (andare a Canossa), Slovenian (pot v Canosso), Hebrew (הליכה לקנוסה - halikha le'kanossa) and Polish (idąc do Kanossy).
