= Saxon revolt of 1073–1075 =

Civil War in the Holy Roman Empire

Saxon revolt
- Part of the Investiture Controversy
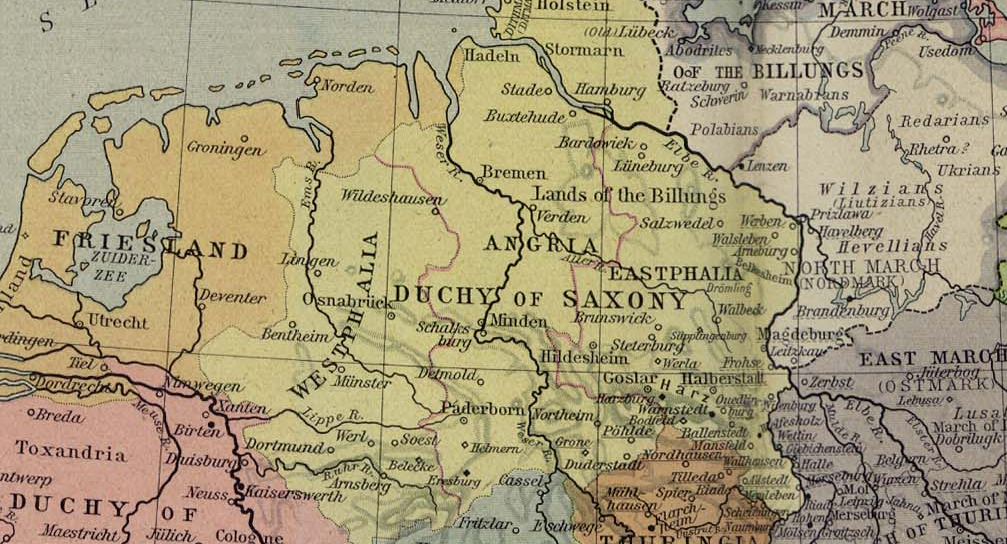
- Duchy of Saxony 919–1125, Historical Atlas by William R. Shepherd, 1923
Date	1073-1075
Location	Germany
Result	Henry IV's victory

Belligerents
Holy Roman Empire (Salian dynasty)	Saxons (Duchy of Saxony)

Commanders and leaders
Henry IV of Germany; Rudolf of Rheinfelden; Vratislaus II of Bohemia; Ernst of Austria †; Theodoric II of Lorraine; Godfrey IV of Lower Lorraine	Otto of Nordheim; Burchard II of Halberstadt; Magnus of Saxony; Lothair Udo II of the Nordmark

The Saxon revolt refers to the struggle between the Salian dynasty ruling the Holy Roman Empire and the rebel Saxons during the reign of Henry IV. The conflict reached its climax in the period from summer 1073 until the end of 1075, in a rebellion that involved several clashes of arms.

== Name ==
The Saxon Rebellion or Rebellion of the Saxons (German: Sachsenkrieg) is also commonly called the Saxon Uprising (not to be confused with the Saxon Wars of Charlemagne, or with the Saxon revolt of 1077-1088).

== Origins ==
Undercurrents of discord between the Salian royal family and the Saxons already existed under Henry's father, Emperor Henry III. This may have been primarily due to his Rhenish Franconian origin as well as his numerous stays in the Imperial Palace of Goslar, which imposed a disproportionately high economic burden on the surrounding population. With the accession of Henry IV in 1065 this conflict intensified, as Henry made demands on numerous Imperial domains (Reichsgüter) in the centre of the Saxon heartland around the Harz mountains, especially the silver mines of Rammelsberg. To secure these estates he initiated a castle building programme, erecting numerous fortresses along the range, the most prominent being the Harzburg castle. This was perceived as a threat by the Saxons. In addition, these castles were staffed with ministeriales of Swabian origin, who frequently plundered the Saxon population to make up for their lack of income.

In 1070 the Saxon count Otto of Nordheim, Duke of Bavaria since 1061, had been accused by the ministerialis Egeno I of Konradsburg of planning an assault on the king's life. Even though Otto was deposed and banned, he nevertheless gained the support of the son of Ordulf, Duke of Saxony, the young Magnus. During this time, King Henry IV had them both captured and arrested. While Otto was pardoned, Magnus remained in custody at the Harzburg and was not released even after his father's death in 1072, as he showed no intention of renouncing the Saxon ducal dignity.

== Motives ==
To grasp the reasons for the uprising, it is important to deal with the persons and parties involved: Emperor Henry IV, the Saxon nobility and the remaining imperial princes.

=== Henry IV ===
The king had his own rationale, which was based on the Coup of Kaiserswerth and which had far-reaching consequences. The period after the coup was used by the imperial princes to further extend their power base within the Empire, since there was no overall de facto ruler able to hinder them. Empress Agnes was too weak and had fallen into disgrace, and the young king was in the hands of Anno of Cologne. When Henry was dubbed a knight in 1065, he was able to counter these developments. However, the course of events should not be seen as a response, since the loss of royal lands in the Harz region may be regarded as of low importance and therefore not an essential motive. These areas had already been a bone of contention under Henry III between the Salians and Saxony. The castle building programme should rather be seen as an expression of royal power, because Henry supported himself prominently through the ministeriales, who were dependent on his benevolence, in order to free himself from the imperial princes. But this drew further displeasure from the princes.

=== The Saxon nobility ===
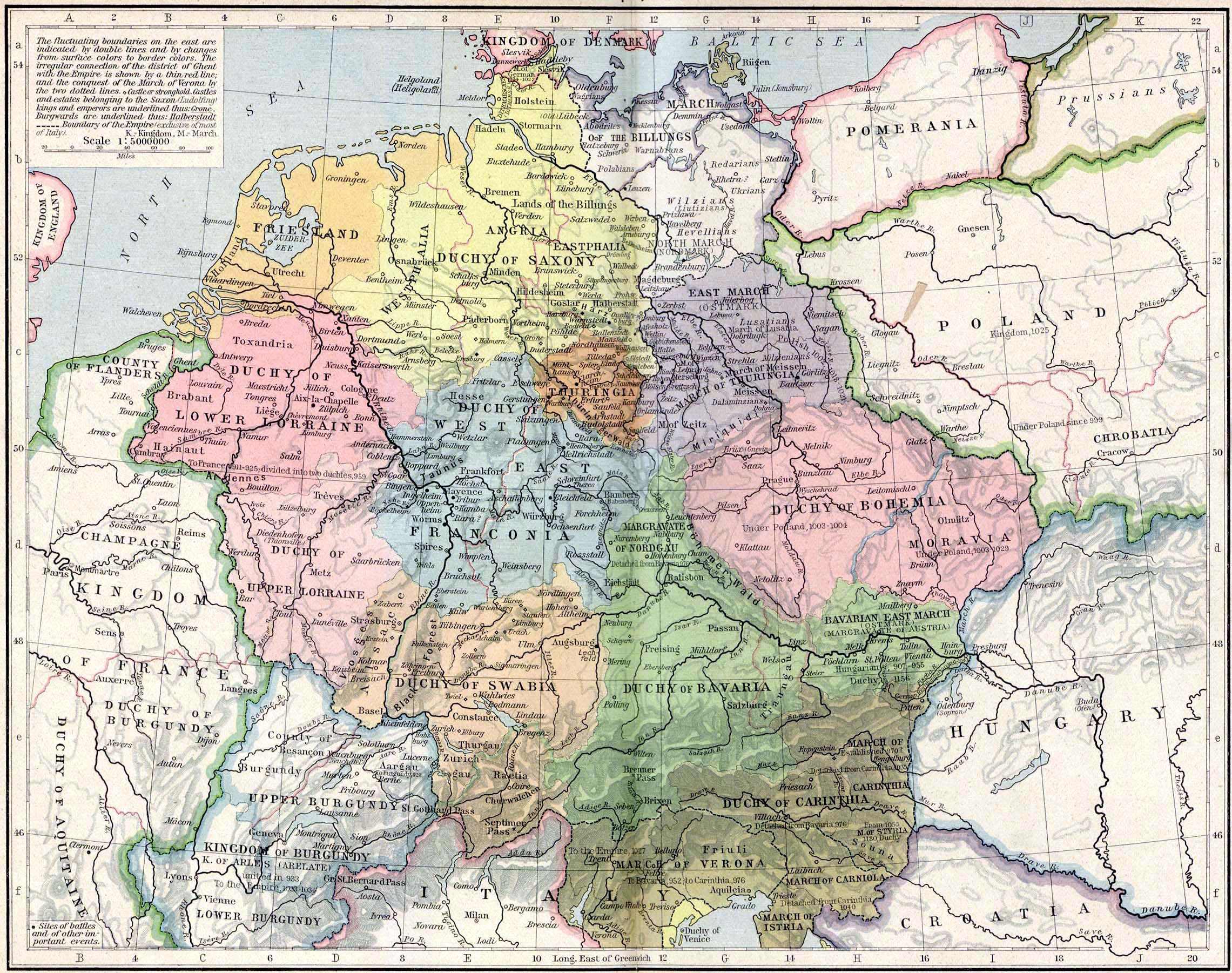
Central Europe 919–1125

The Saxon nobles were significantly affected by Henry's actions and were consequently outraged. They did not want to give up the power and influence that they had built up during the absence of a ruler. This independence, which the king himself tried to address, led to competition with the king, which in turn led to dissatisfaction among the Saxon princes. Henry's endeavours led to the desire for a ruler who would be easier to control and to the king being blamed by the Saxons for his abuse of official authority. There was also a conflict due to the so-called "royal immediacy", the regular presence of the king in certain parts of the Empire. This situation was possibly over-dramatized; for the king stayed in other parts of the Empire without similar concerns. Among the Saxon princes, Otto of Northeim in particular, found the king a serious thorn in his side due to his participation in the Coup of Kaiserswerth and his expansion of possessions in the Harz. Because of this dispute and the later loss of his estates, Otto took a leading role in the insurrection and in the alleged murder plot against the king.

=== The Imperial Princes ===
The quarrels surrounding the ministeriales had wider repercussions and continued even among the non-insurgents. The fear of loss of power resulted in the great princes of the Empire lending their support actively or passively to the insurrection. For example, Rudolf of Swabia, Berthold of Carinthia and Welf IV dissociated themselves from the Emperor.

== Beginning of the rebellion ==
According to the contemporary chronicler Lambert of Hersfeld, the Saxon princes came to the Imperial Palace of Goslar on 29 June 1073 in order to highlight these abuses and demand improvements. Henry IV refused to enter discussions and then fled from the large, advancing Saxon army to the nearby castle of Harzburg, where he was besieged by the Saxon rebels, again led by Count Otto of Nordheim together with Bishop Burchard II of Halberstadt. The king, however, was able to escape on the night of 10 August 1073, allegedly through the castle's well shaft. Henry fled across the Harz mountains reaching the Landgraviate of Thuringia at Eschwege first and then moved on to Franconian Hersfeld further into southern Germany. But he found hardly any support among the princes of the Empire, who were not willing to go to battle with him against the Saxons.

As a result, on 27 January 1074, Henry stood at the head of what was only a small army compared to the much larger Saxon one at Hersfeld. Both sides were afraid to join in battle, but for different reasons. Henry probably because of his obvious inferiority. The Saxon leaders, by contrast, were aware that a victory by their army, consisting mainly of peasants, would have strengthened the position of the latter, something they were not in favour of. So it happened that on 2 February 1074 peace negotiations in Gerstungen took place, which resulted in a settlement between the warring parties. The main outcome was that Henry IV agreed to the slighting of his castles on the edge of the Harz.

Henry's accession to the demolition of his Harz castles included the Harzburg, which included a collegiate church and a family grave containing Henry's dead son and brother. To protect the royal burial ground, Henry directed that only the towers and walls of the Harzburg would be removed. This enraged the surrounding rural population who, in March 1074, razed the castle and its church to their foundation walls and desecrated the royal tombs. This deed may have had a considerable personal effect on Henry, but politically it put all the trumps in his hand: the plunder of the church and the desecration of the royal tomb caused great outrage in his kingdom, and many imperial princes returned to Henry's side. The Saxon nobility refused any blame for the actions of the rural population and immediately offered to restore the castle and church at their own expense.

== First Battle of Langensalza ==
Henry was once again bent on confrontation and this time gathered a much larger army, although he was not able to march against Saxony until 1075. In the First Battle of Langensalza (known in Germany as the "Battle of Homburg on the Unstrut", Homburg being a former monastery near Bad Langensalza) on 9 June 1075 he dealt the Saxon army, which consisted mainly of simple peasants, a crushing defeat and then rampaged through Saxony and Thuringia laying waste.

Amongst the followers of King Henry who fought with him were the Swabian duke Rudolf of Rheinfelden, Duke Vratislaus II of Bohemia, Duke Theoderic II of Upper Lorraine and the Babenberg margrave Ernest of Austria, who was killed in battle, as well as Bishop Hermann of Bamberg and Count Hermann II of Gleiberg. On the Saxon side, in addition to Count Otto of Northeim and Bishop Burchard II von Halberstadt, were Magnus Billung, meanwhile Duke of Saxony, Margrave Lothair Udo II of the Nordmark and Count Gebhard of Supplinburg, who was killed in battle, as well as the Saxon count palatine Frederick II of Goseck and Count Dietrich II of Katlenburg.

One of the two leaders, Bishop Burchard II of Halberstadt, was detained in Homburg by royal troops and finally handed over on 13 June to the Bishop of Bamberg as a prisoner.

The chronicler Lambert of Hersfeld described the battle in his Annals:

The battle raged from midday until the ninth hour, and the armies of the two states, Swabia and Bavaria, were on the brink of fleeing as messengers repeatedly reported to the King that their people were in danger, when suddenly Count Hermann of Gleiberg and the Bamberg troops launched an attack. Now the Duke of Bohemia, followed by Duke Godfrey of Lorraine galloped with their cavalry to join the battle. The Saxons could not withstand this massive onslaught and slowly fell back.

On 27 October at the village of Spier near Sondershausen, the Saxon leader finally capitulated to the king in public, i.e. in front of the whole army. Henry had no mercy, but savoured his triumph. The Saxon leader's submission was barefoot, according to Lambert, and the surrender, without exception, unconditional. Henry then held numerous Saxon princes in prison in various places and transferred their fiefs to others.

== Aftermath ==
Beginning almost simultaneously with the surrender, the Investiture Controversy took Henry's full attention in the years that followed. Unrest in Saxony also continuously flared up during this period, but did not reach the same level of political and military disruption as in the time from 1073 to 1075.

At the diet of princes in Trebur in October 1076, Otto of Northeim again aligned himself with the opposition. Although he was always a potential candidate, the princes did not choose him; instead, in 1077 in Forchheim, they selected Rudolf of Rheinfelden and, later, Hermann of Salm as antikings. Nevertheless, Otto had a significant influence on the opposition's politics. Militarily, he distinguished himself again in the battles of Mellrichstadt, Flarchheim and the Elster, leading from the front.

Even Henry's son, King Henry V of Germany, still had to fight the Saxons. He lost, for example, the 1115 Battle of Welfesholz to the Saxons led by his later successor, King Lothair III.

== Sources ==
=== Primary sources ===
- Bruno the Saxon, "Brunos Sachsenkrieg" [Brunonis Saxonicum bellum; German], translated by Franz-Josef Schmale. In: Quellen zur Geschichte Kaiser Heinrichs IV, Darmstadt: 1968. (= selected sources about the German history of the Middle Ages. Freiherr vom Stein - memorial edition; 12), pp. 191–405.
- Carmen de bello saxonico. Das Lied vom Sachsenkrieg, translated by Franz-Josef Schmale. In: Quellen zur Geschichte Kaiser Heinrichs IV, Darmstadt, 1968. (= selected sources about the German history of the Middle Ages. Freiherr vom Stein - memorial edition; 12), p. 142–189.
- Lambert of Hersfeld: Annalen, Darmstadt 1957. (= selected sources about the German history of the Middle Ages. Freiherr vom Stein - memorial edition; 13)

The two well-known authors, Bruno and Lambert of Hersfeld, describe the conflict from the perspective of the Saxons, while the unknown author of Carmen was a partisan of Henry.

=== Secondary sources ===
- Gerd Althoff: Heinrich IV. Darmstadt, 2006, pp. 86ff., ISBN 3-534-11273-3. (Review)
- Gerhard Baaken:Königtum, Burgen und Königsfreie. Studien zu ihrer Geschichte in Ostsachsen. In: Theodor Mayer (ed.): Vorträge und Forschungen, Vol. VI, Stuttgart, 1961, pp. 9–95.
- Matthias Becher: Die Auseinandersetzung Heinrichs IV. mit den Sachsen. Freiheitskampf oder Adelsrevolte? In: Vom Umbruch zu Erneuerung? - das 11. und beginnende 12. Jahrhundert – Positionen der Forschung, ed. Jörg Jarnut and Matthias Weinhoff, Munich, 2006, pp. 357–378.
- Sabine Borchert: Herzog Otto von Northeim (um 1025–1083) – Reichspolitik und personelles Umfeld. Hanover, 2005.
- Karl Bosl: Die Reichsministerialität der Salier und Staufer. Ein Beitrag zur Geschichte des hochmittelalterlichen deutschen Volkes, Staates und Reiches. Stuttgart, 1950, ISBN 3-7772-5004-X.
- Lutz Fenske: Adelsopposition und kirchliche Reformbewegung im östlichen Sachsen Entstehung und Wirkung des sächsischen Widerstandes gegen das salische Königtum während des Investiturstreites. Gottingen, 1977, ISBN 3-525-35356-1.
- Wolfgang Giese: Reichsstrukturprobleme unter den Saliern – der Adel in Ostsachsen. In: Stefan Weinfurter (ed.), Die Salier und das Reich. Band 1: Salier, Adel und Reichsverfassung, Sigmaringen, 1991, pp. 273–308.
- Johannes Laudage, Matthias Schrör (eds.): Der Investiturstreit – Quellen und Materialien, 2nd edn., Cologne, 2006, p. 87.
- Johannes Laudage: Die Salier – Das erste deutsche Königshaus. Munich, 2006.
- Johannes Laudage: Welf IV. und die Kirchenreform des 11. Jahrhunderts. In: Dieter Bauer, Matthias Becher (eds.): Welf IV. - Schlüsselfigur einer Wendezeit Regionale und europäische Perspektive, Munich, 2004, pp. 280–313.
- Schulze, Hans K. (1991). Hegemoniales Kaisertum: Ottonen und Salier. Berlin, ISBN 3-88680-307-4.
- Talkenberg, Fabian (2010). Rebellion am Vorabend von Canossa: Der Sachsenaufstand gegen Heinrich IV.. Marburg, ISBN 978-3-8288-2355-6.
- Stefan Weinfurter: Canossa – Die Entzauberung der Welt. Munich, 2006.
