= Coup of Kaiserswerth =

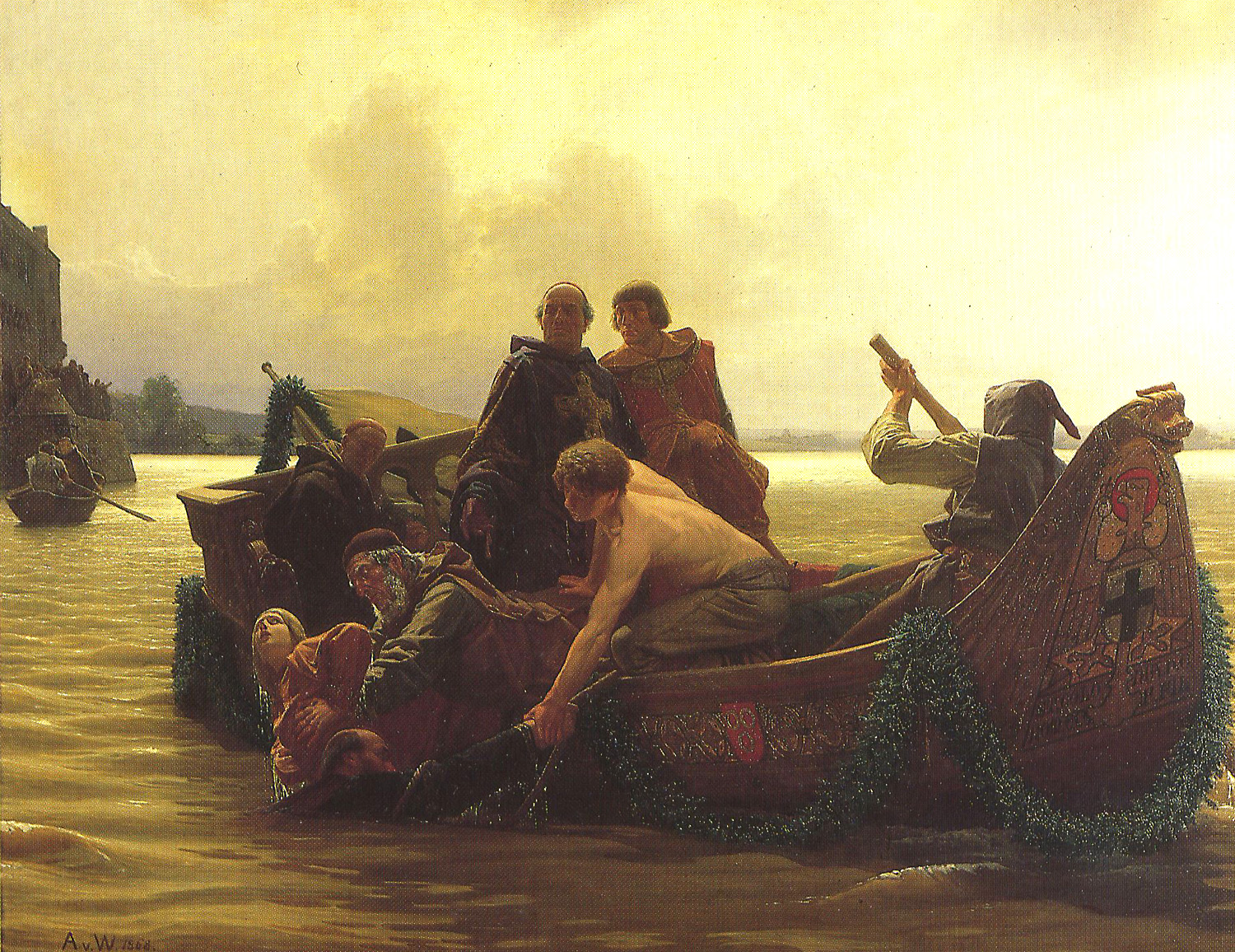
Kidnapping of Henry IV by Archbishop Anno of Cologne, history painting by Anton von Werner (1868)

The Coup of Kaiserswerth (German: Staatsstreich von Kaiserswerth) in 1062 was a thitherto unprecedented action of several secular and ecclesiastical princes of the Holy Roman Empire under the leadership of Archbishop Anno II of Cologne against Empress Agnes, ruling on behalf of her under-age son, King Henry IV, and against her chosen sub-regent, Bishop Henry II of Augsburg. By kidnapping the young king and enforcing the handover of the Imperial Regalia, the group gained control of the reins of power in the Empire.

== Abduction of the king ==
In early April 1062, Empress Agnes and her eleven-year-old son, King Henry IV, were staying in the Königspfalz of Kaiserswerth (today a quarter in Düsseldorf), erected by Agnes' late husband, Emperor Henry III, where both met with Archbishop Anno II of Cologne. After banqueting together, Anno invited the boy to visit a magnificent ship that he had moored in the River Rhine nearby. What Henry experienced when he boarded the ship, is related by the contemporary chronicler Lambert of Hersfeld as follows:

But no sooner had he entered the ship when he was surrounded by the archbishop's hired accomplices, the rowers quickly gathered themselves up, threw themselves behind their oars with all their might and propelled the ship rapidly into the middle of the stream. The king, stunned by these unexpected events and unsure what was happening, could only think that they wanted to attack and murder him, and so plunged headlong into the river, and he would have drowned in the raging waters had not Count Egbert, despite the great danger in which he put himself, dived in after him, and rescued the endangered king from drowning with great difficulty and returned to the ship.

— Lampert von Hersfeld, Annalen, p. 75

Anno then took the king up the river to his Cologne residence and blackmailed Empress Agnes to hand over the Imperial Regalia. As a consequence the power of the state fell into the hands of the rebels, who, in addition to Anno and Count Egbert of Brunswick, mentioned by Lambert, also included Otto of Northeim as well as the Archbishops Adalbert of Bremen and Siegfried of Mainz.

== Motives of the kidnappers ==
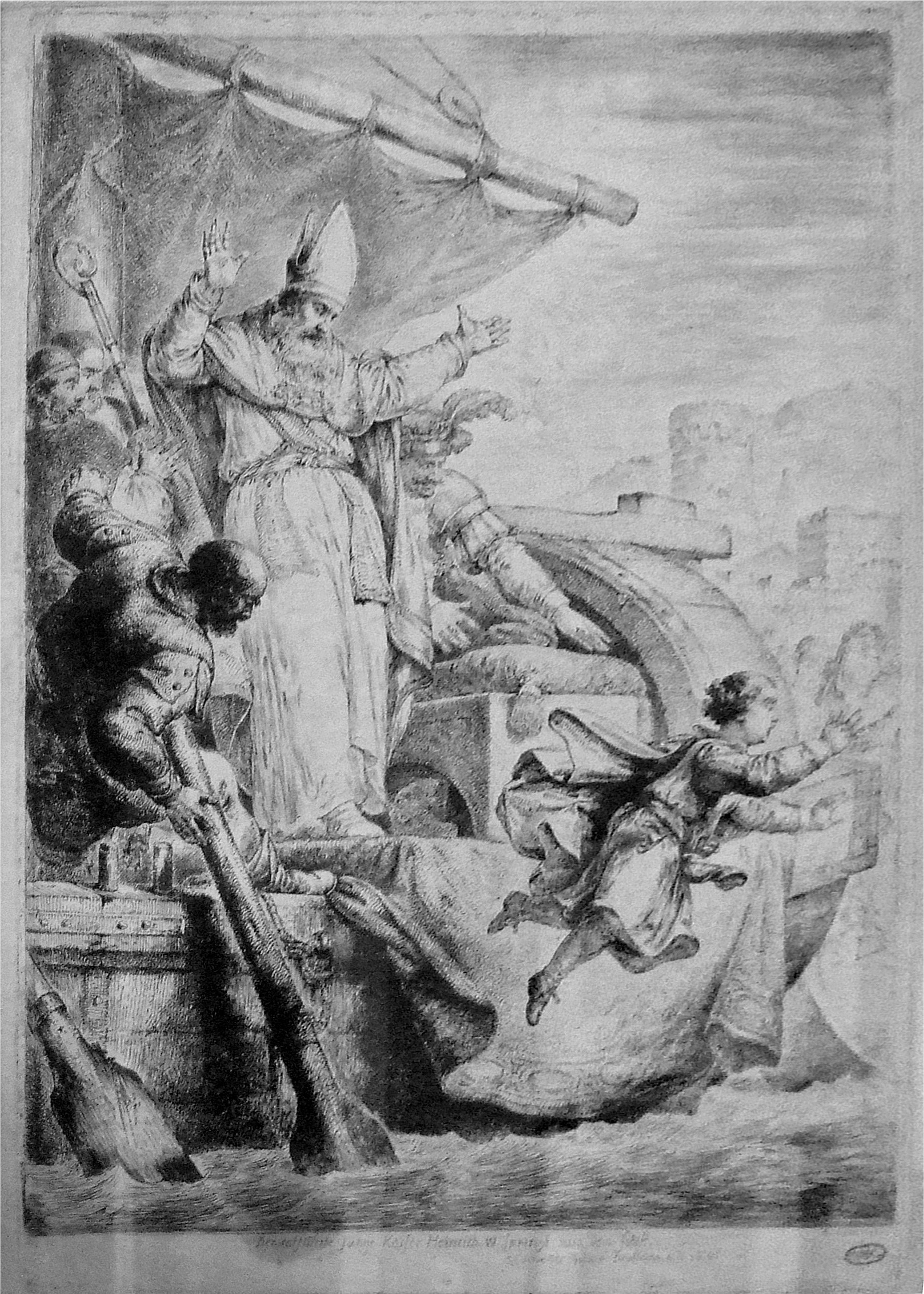
Emperor Henry Jumps from the Boat of his Kidnappers, acquaforte by Bernhard Rode (1781)

The motives for the attack are still not entirely clear, especially as the sources for this event are extremely contradictory. The opinion of the contemporary commentators is divided. Lambert's report still seems to be relatively objective when he writes that the kidnappers and Anno, in particular, sought to "rescue the son from the influence of his mother and to seize the administration of the Empire for themselves." Lambert did not speculate on the motives of the conspirators. He points out the possibility that Anno had "acted out of political ambition", but admits that he may have also acted for the good of the Empire.

The assessment of the Vita Heinrici IV imperatoris, however, appears subjective and may be better understood if one assumes that the anonymous author was very close to the royal family. Here, it suggests, inter alia, that the motive for the kidnapping was fear of Agnes' "maturity, wisdom and strict morals". The official reason, that it was not proper for the kingdom to be ruled by a woman, is rejected by the author. Here, he even claims that they had kidnapped the young king only to have unrestricted freedom to expand their own power.

Bruno the Saxon even more or less states that Henry himself was to blame for his own kidnapping: young Henry "full of royal arrogance hardly [heeded] his mother's admonitions". Anno had him educated "with great care" after his kidnapping. Bruno not only entirely denies that Empress Agnes was so assertive, i.e. he considered her to be too weak (whether in terms of ensuring the proper education of the young king or in terms of her regency, is not clear), but he even praised Anno for his actions. His criticism of Henry IV himself is probably explained by the fact that Bruno did not subsequently agree with Henry's politics and saw negative traits in the king from an early age. That he was, politically, not on Agnes' side, is obvious.

Although the sources apparently fail to report anything reliably about the motives of the kidnappers, current research now believes that both the pursuit of power (especially for Anno of Cologne), as well as concern for the neglect and the education of Henry IV were crucial to the case. The rebellion was also directed against Empress Agnes' subregent, Bishop Henry of Augsburg, who was accused of having an "unskillful and pretentious way of handling the business of government". In addition, according to the chronicler Lambert of Hersfeld, "the Empress and the bishop could not escape the suspicion of an affair, because there was a general rumour that such a confidential relationship could not develop without an illicit relationship."

== Consequences ==
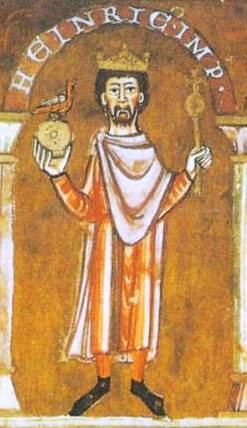
Emperor Henry IV, St. Emmeram's Abbey, 12th century

Although Anno of Cologne had to provide a justification for his actions in summer 1062 at a Hoftag assembly, he took over the education of the young king and initially retained the reins of government in his hands. Even when the young king finally ascended the throne, Anno controlled, from that moment on, the fate of the Empire. He did not hesitate to strengthen the power of his Cologne electorate; politically, he felt himself primarily bound to church reform party. In probably his most significant political act, he headed a 1064 synod in Mantua where he reached a resolution of the papal schism between Alexander II and Honorius II upon the election of 1061. According to an expertise delivered by Anno's nephew Bishop Burchard II of Halbertsadt the synod decided in favour of Alexander.

However, Anno found he had no personal access to Henry, unlike his co-conspirator Adalbert of Bremen, and the two archbishops soon became bitter enemies. The princes had enforced Adalbert's installation as Henry's tutor and he had quickly built up a close relationship with the king, whereby Anno's position became increasingly undermined. Nevertheless, Adalbert of Bremen also ultimately had personal interests primarily in mind and strictly pursued a policy that resulted in "dividends" for his Bremen archdiocese.

After the coup, Bishop Henry of Augsburg was stripped of all governmental powers, as was Empress Agnes. Still, her presence in the Empire continued to be required and until King Henry IV reached his majority, she remained head of the Salian dynasty. Only through her remaining in the kingdom could she claim the throne for her son. Against this background, Lambert's report that Agnes, on the advice of her counsellors, abandoned her intention to enter a nunnery, is given a firm, legal footing and thus gains in authenticity. It was not until King Henry IV came of age and an accolade ceremony was held on 29 March 1065 in Mainz, that Agnes could achieve her long-held desire for life in the monastery. But first, she was able to dissuade her son from killing the hated Anno, after he had presented him with his sword.

At the beknighting of the king, imperial power returned to the hands of the rightful ruler. The nearly three-year-long period of transitional reign came to an end, though Adalbert of Bremen remained the principal adviser to Henry until January 1066 at a Hoftag in Trebur, when, at the bidding of the princes, he was dismissed as counsellor.

== Sources ==
- Bruno von Merseburg: Brunonis Saxonicum bellum. Brunos Sachsenkrieg. translated by Franz-Josef Schmale. In: Quellen zur Geschichte Kaiser Heinrichs IV. Darmstadt, 1968. (= selected sources from the German History of the Middle Ages (Deutsche Geschichte des Mittelalters), Freiherr vom Stein memorial edition; 12). pp. 191–405.
- Das Leben Kaiser Heinrichs IV. Übers. v. Irene Schmale-Ott. Darmstadt, 1963. (= selected sources from the German History of the Middle Ages (Deutsche Geschichte des Mittelalters), Freiherr vom Stein memorial edition; 12)
- Lampert von Hersfeld: Annalen. Darmstadt, 1957. (= selected sources from the German History of the Middle Ages (Deutsche Geschichte des Mittelalters), Freiherr vom Stein memorial edition; 13)

== Literature ==
- Egon Boshof: Die Salier. Kohlhammer Verlag, 5th current edition, Stuttgart, 2008, ISBN 3-17-020183-2.
- Mechthild Black-Veldtrup: Kaiserin Agnes (1043–1077). Quellenkritische Studien. Böhlau Verlag, Cologne, 1995, ISBN 3-412-02695-6.
- (Dieter Herion): Warum Kaiser Heinrich IV. "nach Canossa" ging und dennoch den Kölner Ratsturm zieren darf; in: Als über Köln noch Hexen flogen..., BoD Verlag Norderstedt, 2008, ISBN 978-3-8334-8775-0
- Hans K. Schulze: Hegemoniales Kaisertum. Siedler, Berlin, 1991, ISBN 3-88680-307-4
- Tilman Struve: Lampert von Hersfeld, der Königsraub von Kaiserswerth im Jahre 1062 und die Erinnerungskultur des 19. Jahrhunderts. In: Archiv für Kulturgeschichte, Vol. 88 (2006), 2, pp. 251–278.
