= Henry IV, Holy Roman Emperor =

Holy Roman Emperor from 1084 to 1105

Henry IV
- Imperator Romanorum
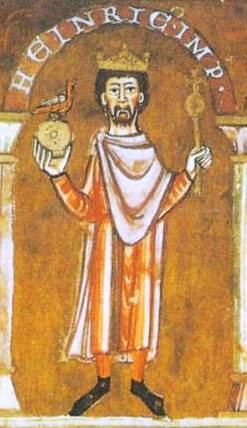
- Henry in full regalia (depicted in the 11th-century Evangelion of Saint Emmeram's Abbey)

Holy Roman Emperor
- Reign: 1084–1105
- Coronation: 1 April 1084; Old St. Peter's Basilica, Rome
- Predecessor: Henry III
- Successor: Henry V

King of Germany
- Reign: 1054–1105
- Coronation: 17 July 1054; Aachen Cathedral
- Predecessor: Henry III
- Successor: Henry V

King of Italy and Burgundy
- Reign: 1056–1105
- Predecessor: Henry III
- Successor: Henry V
- Born: 11 November 1050; Imperial Palace of Goslar, Saxony (?)
- Died: 7 August 1106 (aged 55); Liège, Lower Lorraine
- Burial: Speyer Cathedral
- Spouses: Bertha of Savoy (m. 1066; died 1087) Eupraxia of Kiev (m. 1089; sep. 1095)
- Issue: Agnes, Duchess of Swabia; Conrad II, King of Italy; Henry V, Holy Roman Emperor
- House: Salian dynasty
- Father: Henry III, Holy Roman Emperor
- Mother: Agnes of Poitou
- Religion: Catholic Church

Henry IV (German: Heinrich IV; 11 November 1050 – 7 August 1106) was Holy Roman Emperor (1084–1105), King of Germany (1054–1105), and King of Italy and Burgundy (1056–1105). A Salian ruler, he was the son of Henry III and Agnes of Poitou. After his father's death in 1056, his mother acted as regent, granting lands to secure aristocratic support. Unable to control papal elections, she witnessed the growing assertion of the "liberty of the Church", a principle central to the emerging Gregorian Reform. In 1062, Archbishop Anno II of Cologne kidnapped Henry and governed until he came of age in 1065.

Seeking to recover royal estates lost during his minority, Henry relied on lower-ranking officials, provoking unrest in Saxony and Thuringia. He suppressed revolts there in 1069 and 1071, but his promotion of commoners alienated the nobility. Insisting on his royal prerogative to appoint bishops and abbots, he became embroiled in what would later be known as the Investiture Controversy, leading Pope Alexander II to excommunicate Henry's advisers in 1073. After crushing a renewed rebellion in Saxony in 1075, Henry adopted an active policy in Italy, alarming Alexander's successor, Gregory VII, who threatened him with excommunication for selling church offices.

In 1076, German bishops, encouraged by Henry, declared Gregory's election invalid. Gregory responded by excommunicating Henry and releasing his subjects from allegiance. Facing opposition at home, Henry sought absolution through his penitential "Walk to Canossa" in 1077. Though restored to communion, he confronted a rival king, Rudolf of Rheinfelden. Renewed excommunication in 1080 led Henry's supporters to elect the antipope Clement III. Rudolf's death strengthened Henry's position, although his opponents chose a new antiking, Hermann of Salm; in 1084, Clement crowned Henry emperor in Rome.

From 1089 to 1096, Henry campaigned in Italy against his son Conrad II, Matilda of Tuscany, and Welf I of Bavaria. After Clement's death, Henry refrained from supporting further antipopes and proclaimed the first Reichsfriede (imperial peace), extending across the whole of Germany, in 1103. In 1105, his younger son, Henry V, forced his abdication. Attempting to regain power, he fell ill and died in 1106 without absolution. His central role in the Investiture Controversy and the "Walk to Canossa" ensured a profoundly contested legacy.

== Background ==
Henry was the third ruler of the Salian dynasty, which governed Germany from 1024 to 1125 and exercised authority over Italy and Burgundy. With a strong claim to the title of Holy Roman Emperor, the German kings regarded themselves as the supreme leaders of Christendom and as entitled to influence papal elections in Rome. However, Roman aristocratic factions dominated the papacy, and their rivalries culminated in the schism of 1045 with three rival popes. To resolve the crisis, Henry's father, Emperor Henry III, convened the Synod of Sutri in 1046, which deposed the claimants and installed the German bishop Suidger of Bamberg as Pope Clement II.

By virtue of his anointing with holy oil, Henry III conceived kingship as a priestly office. He regarded himself as "Vicar of Christ", entitled to govern Church and state alike. After receiving the hereditary title of patrician from the Romans, he held the right to cast the first vote at papal elections, thereby securing the appointment of German reform-minded popes. The third of these, Leo IX, prohibited the sale of church offices and promoted clerical celibacy. Yet imperial control over the Church conflicted with the reformist ideal of "liberty of the Church", a tension that culminated under Henry IV in the Investiture Controversy.

Germany, Italy, and Burgundy consisted of semi-autonomous provinces governed by bishops, abbots, and dukes. Although kings sought to control these offices, they ultimately depended on the cooperation of the leading aristocracy. Towards the end of his reign, Henry III came into conflict with several powerful dukes. He alienated Duke Bernard II of Saxony by supporting his rival, Archbishop Adalbert of Hamburg, and Godfrey the Bearded, Duke of Upper Lotharingia, married the wealthy Beatrice of Tuscany without imperial consent. The frequent royal presence in the royal domains in Saxony further increased local resentment, which later erupted into revolts under Henry IV.

Beyond the empire, Henry compelled Duke Bretislav I of Bohemia and King Peter of Hungary to swear fealty, but lost influence in Hungary after Peter's deposition in 1046. Dynastic conflicts there prompted further German interventions. In 1047, Henry asserted authority over the Norman princes of southern Italy, but increasingly relied on the papacy to represent imperial interests.

== Early life ==
Born on 11 November 1050, Henry was the son of Emperor Henry III by his second wife, Agnes of Poitou. Henry was most likely born in his father's palace at Goslar. Henry III had fathered four daughters, but his subjects were convinced only a male heir could secure peace. Henry was first named for his grandfather, Emperor Conrad II, but his godfather, Abbot Hugh of Cluny, convinced the Emperor to give his name to his heir. While celebrating Christmas 1050 at Pöhlde in Saxony, Henry III designated his infant son as his successor.

Archbishop Hermann baptised Henry in Cologne on Easter Sunday 1051. In November, the Emperor held an assembly at Tribur. The German princes who attended the meeting elected the one-year-old king. They stipulated they would acknowledge him as his father's successor only if he ruled justly during his father's lifetime. Historian Ian S. Robinson supposes the princes actually wanted to persuade Henry III to change his methods of government since the child king had no role in state administration. At Christmas 1052, the Emperor made Henry the duke of Bavaria.

Archbishop Hermann crowned Henry King of Germany in Aachen on 17 July 1054. On this occasion, the Emperor probably granted Bavaria to Henry's two-year-old younger brother, Conrad. When Conrad died in 1055, the Emperor gave Bavaria to Empress Agnes. He betrothed Henry to Bertha of Savoy in late 1055. Her parents, Adelaide, Margravine of Turin, and Otto, Count of Savoy, controlled north-western Italy.

Henry III fell seriously ill in late September 1056. Already dying, he commended his son to the protection of Pope Victor II, who had come from Italy to Germany to seek the Emperor's protection against the Normans of southern Italy. Henry III died on 5 October 1056.

== King under guardianship ==
=== Agnes's regency ===
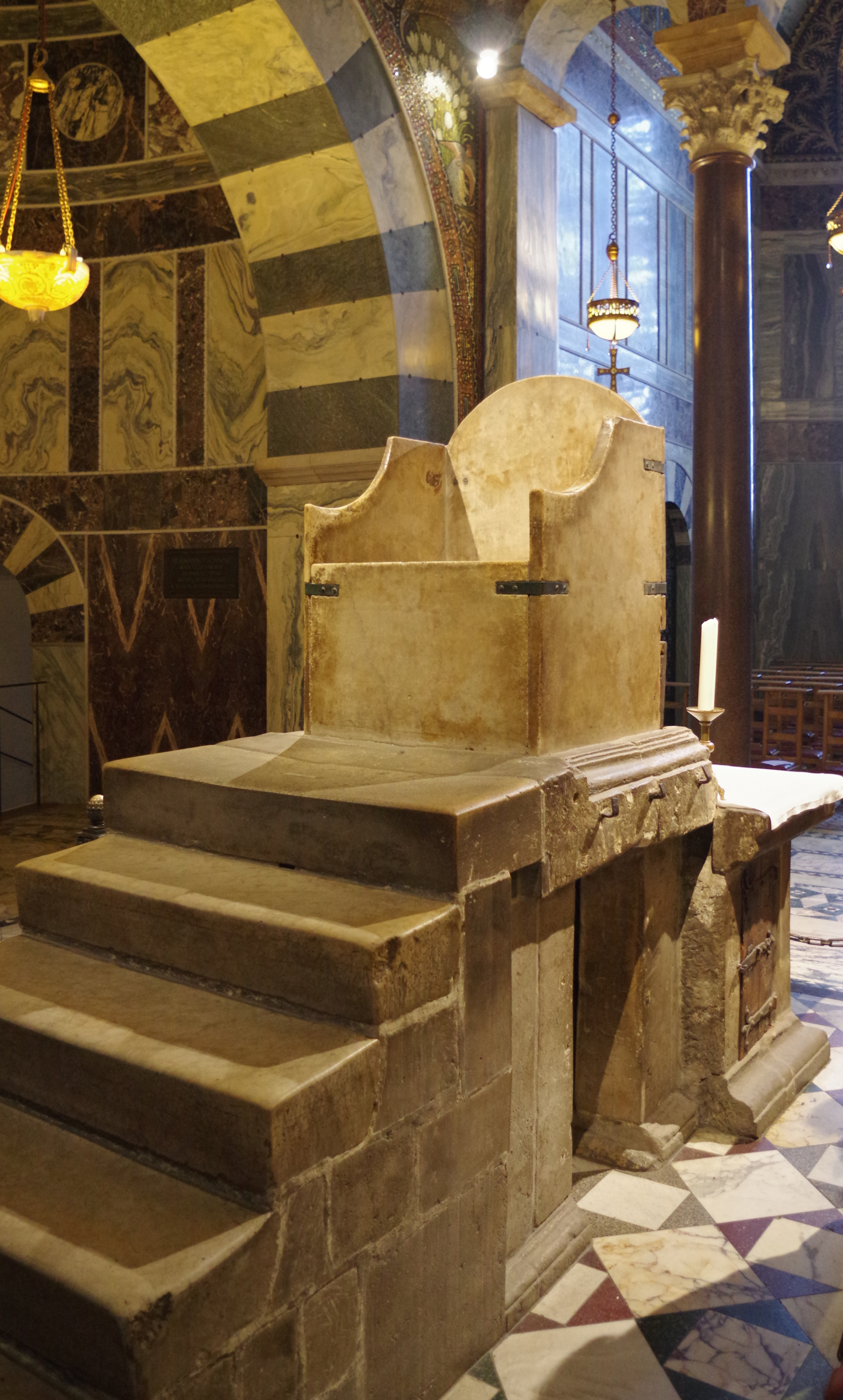
Throne of Charlemagne in the Palatine Chapel in Aachen

At the age of six, Henry became sole ruler of the empire and was crowned at Aachen with papal support, while his mother Agnes served as regent and guardian. She supervised his education with the royal ministerialis (unfree liegeman), Cuno. Agnes secured aristocratic loyalty through grants, reconciled with Godfrey the Bearded, and appointed Conrad of the Ezzonid family, an opponent of her late husband, as Duke of Carinthia. She paid little attention to Burgundy and Italy, entrusting Burgundy to the aristocrat Rudolf of Rheinfelden after appointing him Duke of Swabia.

In Saxony, Otto of Nordmark, a former exile, attempted a coup against royal authority; the loyalist Bruno II of Brunswick killed Otto but was himself mortally wounded. Henry retained his father's Roman title of patrician, but in Rome the principle of the "liberty of the Church" became increasingly dominant, and Godfrey the Bearded's brother was elected Pope Stephen IX without royal intervention. After Godfrey seized Spoleto and Fermo in Italy, rumours of his imperial ambitions with papal support spread, but Stephen IX died unexpectedly on 29 March 1058.

The Roman aristocracy installed Giovanni, Cardinal-Bishop of Velletri, as pope without consulting the German court. His election was contested, and the cardinals supported Bishop Gerard of Florence. After consulting the princes, Henry designated Gerard as pope in June 1058. Later that year he concluded an agreement with King Andrew I of Hungary. It secured the succession of Andrew's five-year-old son Solomon over Béla, Andrew's brother, and arranged Solomon's betrothal to Henry's sister Judith. Gerard was installed as Pope Nicholas II in December 1058. He and Godfrey the Bearded expelled Giovanni of Velletri from Rome. Advised by the monk Hildebrand, Nicholas issued the decree In nomine Domini, granting the cardinals the right to elect popes while confirming unspecified imperial prerogatives. At the same time, reformers such as Cardinal Humbert of Silva Candida challenged the rulers' right to invest bishops and abbots.

Pope Nicholas invested two Norman rulers, Robert Guiscard and Richard I of Capua, with southern Italian duchies in 1059. In return, the Normans swore fealty to Nicholas and promised to support him against his enemies. Although the duchies were imperial fiefs, Nicholas's action did not necessarily trespass on imperial rights, because the popes had acted as the emperors' representatives in southern Italy for a decade. However, the Pope's treaty with the Normans forged their lasting alliance.

In 1060, after Agnes's uncoordinated intervention failed, Béla of Hungary overthrew his brother Andrew with Polish support. Andrew soon died of his wounds, and his family fled to Germany. The German frontier duchies were then reinforced: Agnes granted Bavaria to the Saxon Otto of Nordheim and replaced Duke Conrad of Carinthia with Berthold of Zähringen in early 1061.

Relations with the papacy deteriorated for unknown reasons, and after Nicholas II's death the reformers elected his successor, Alexander II, without royal consent on 30 September 1061, although Roman aristocrats had dispatched an embassy to Henry asking him to name his candidate. In response Henry convened a synod at Basel, which elected Cadalus, Bishop of Parma, as Antipope Honorius II on 28 October. The papal schism divided the German clergy: some prelates, such as Archbishop Adalbert of Hamburg, supported Honorius II, while others, including Archbishop Anno II of Cologne, recognised Alexander II.

=== Coup of Kaiserswerth and Anno's rule ===
Agnes's support for Honorius, the failure of the Hungarian campaign, and her favoritism for Bishop Henry II of Augsburg had undermined her authority. In April 1062, Archbishop Anno and other nobles, including Otto of Nordheim and Egbert I of Brunswick, removed her from the regency in the Coup of Kaiserswerth. During the coup Anno lured Henry onto a ship on the Rhine and had it cast off. Fearing for his life, Henry leapt into the river but Egbert rescued him from drowning.

Agnes then withdrew from government, and Anno assumed control, also taking charge of Henry's education. He sought to end the schism and sent his nephew Burchard II, Bishop of Halberstadt, to start negotiations with Pope Alexander. Reformist clerics such as Peter Damian defended Alexander's election and questioned imperial prerogatives in papal elections, arguing that Henry's "right to participate in the papal elections … is subject each time to reconfirmation by the pope". Respect for royal authority also declined in Germany, and armed conflict erupted between the retainers of Abbot Widerad of Fulda and Bishop Hezilo of Hildesheim in Henry's presence at Goslar in June 1063.

In 1063 Henry led a campaign in Hungary to restore Solomon against his uncle Béla I, gaining his first military experience. After Béla died in an accident, the German army entered Székesfehérvár, where Henry installed Solomon as king and attended his marriage to Judith. Archbishop Adalbert of Hamburg accompanied Henry during the campaign and emerged as his "protector" in royal diplomas, indicating his growing influence, especially after Archbishop Anno left for Italy in 1064 to recognise Pope Alexander.

== Reign as king ==
=== First years of majority ===
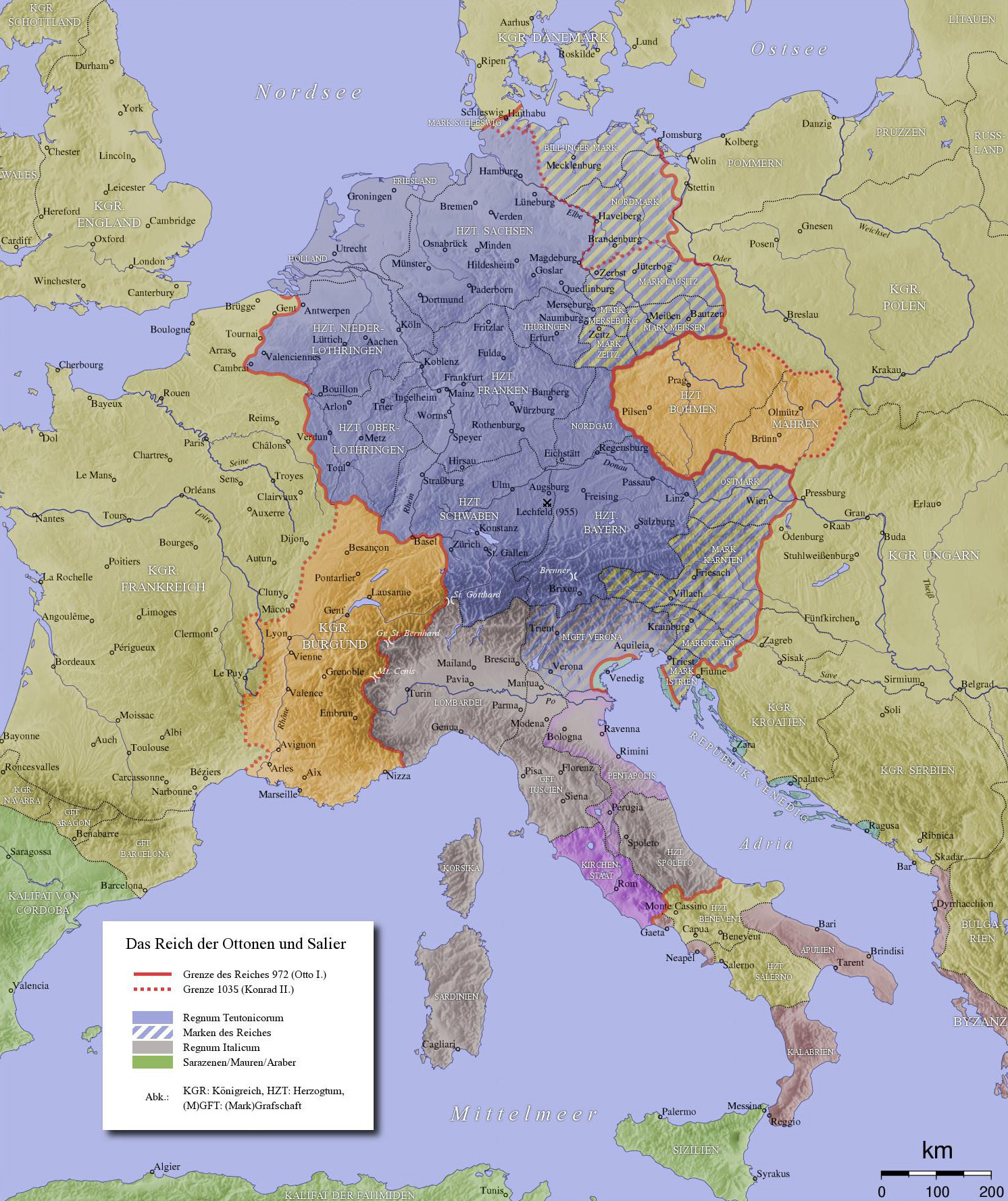
Map of the Holy Roman Empire in the 10th and 11th centuries: Germany (blue), Italy (grey), Burgundy (orange to the West), Bohemia (orange to the East), Papal States (purple).

At the age of fourteen Henry was girded with a sword as a sign of his coming of age at Worms on 29 March 1065. According to Lampert of Hersfeld, he quarrelled with Archbishop Anno of Cologne soon after the ceremony, and Anno was subsequently excluded from court. Although Lampert's account is not entirely reliable, Agnes appears to have briefly recovered her influence. Two months later, however, she left for Italy, allowing Archbishop Adalbert of Bremen to dominate royal government. At Worms, Henry had accepted Pope Alexander II's invitation to Rome, but the journey was first postponed until autumn and then indefinitely, despite the Pope's need for his support against the Italian adherents of the antipope Honorius II. Instead, Henry travelled to Burgundy in June 1065, where later Burgundian diplomas treated his presence as the beginning of his reign. From Burgundy, he went to Lorraine and granted Lower Lorraine to Godfrey the Bearded in October.

Meanwhile, Adalbert of Bremen, acting with Henry's young friend Werner, abused royal authority to seize church property and to accept bribes for appointments. They persuaded Henry to distribute monasteries among leading prelates and princes to placate their resentment. Adalbert's attempt to take possession of Lorsch Abbey by force proved decisive, as the scandal enabled Archbishops Siegfried of Mainz and Anno of Cologne to organise opposition. With the support of Otto of Nordheim, Rudolf of Rheinfelden, and Berthold of Zähringen, they persuaded Henry to dismiss Adalbert in January 1066. Anno regained royal favour, but thereafter no adviser exercised comparable control over the government.

Henry fell gravely ill in mid-May 1066 and was widely thought to be dying, prompting discussion of his succession. He recovered within two weeks and soon married his betrothed Bertha, probably to stabilise the political situation. Later in 1066, Prince Richard of Capua rebelled against Pope Alexander II and invaded the Roman Campagna. Early in 1067, Agnes returned from Italy to urge her son to intervene, but Godfrey the Bearded launched a successful counter-offensive against Richard in June, an independent action resented as a slight to royal authority in Italy. Adalbert's fall had encouraged the Lutici, a pagan Slavic people beyond the river Elbe, to raid northern Germany and plunder Hamburg. In 1069, Henry crossed the Elbe, defeated them in battle, and temporarily checked their subsequent incursions into Saxony.

=== First Saxon rebellion and aristocratic resistance ===
Large parcels of the royal demesne were distributed during Henry's minority, and he decided to recover them around 1069. Most of these estates lay in Saxony, but he dispatched Swabian ministeriales to investigate property rights. The appointment of non-native and unfree officials offended the Saxons, particularly because they disregarded traditional civil procedures. New royal castles were erected in Saxony and garrisoned with Swabian troops. Like his father, Henry spent much time in Saxony, and the accommodation of his retinue remained an irksome burden for the Saxons. The Thuringians were also angered by Henry's support for Archbishop Siegfried of Mainz's claim to levy tithes from them, although most Thuringians had long been exempt. The first Saxon lord to rebel was Dedi I, Margrave of Lower Lusatia. He claimed benefices formerly held by Otto I, Margrave of Meissen, his wife's earlier husband, but Henry refused in 1069. Dedi sought Thuringian support, but after Henry promised to confirm their exemption from tithes, they joined the royal army. Henry invaded Dedi's lands and compelled his surrender.

Otto of Nordheim held extensive estates in Saxony. After a nobleman, Egeno, accused him of plotting against Henry's life, Otto was summoned in early August 1070 to clear himself by single combat. The chronicler Bruno the Saxon later alleged that Henry had bribed Egeno, though his account is partisan. Fearing an unjust judgment, Otto disobeyed the summons and fled from Bavaria to Saxony. Henry outlawed Otto and confiscated his benefices. He invaded Otto's Saxon lands, while Otto raided royal estates in Thuringia. Ordulf, Duke of Saxony, and most Saxon nobles remained loyal, but his son Magnus joined Otto. Henry granted Bavaria to Otto's wealthy son-in-law, Welf, at Christmas 1070. Without wider support, Otto and Magnus surrendered and were placed in the German dukes' and bishops' custody in June 1071.

Archbishop Adalbert of Bremen persuaded Henry to release Otto early in 1072, though Magnus remained imprisoned. Adalbert soon died, and Henry seized his treasury, an early instance of royal use of the jus spolii. Henry's growing practice of appointing low-ranking men to office angered the aristocracy. Rudolf of Rheinfelden and Berthold of Zähringen withdrew from court, and rumours of conspiracy spread. Rudolf appealed to Empress Agnes, who returned from Rome and mediated a reconciliation in July 1072. It soon failed, since Henry did not dismiss his advisers. Agnes shared the princes' hostility to these advisers and persuaded Pope Alexander to excommunicate several of them in February 1073.

=== Conflicts with the papacy and a new Saxon rebellion ===
Appointments to the highest church offices remained a central element of Henry's authority, enabling him to demand benefices for his supporters from wealthy bishops and abbots, although reformist clergy condemned him for selling offices. When Henry appointed the Milanese nobleman Gotofredo to the Archbishopric of Milan in 1070, Pope Alexander II excommunicated Gotofredo. Henry nevertheless obtained his consecration, which led to a prolonged conflict with the Holy See. The Bishopric of Constance became another source of tension when local clerics appealed to Rome to prevent the installation of Henry's candidate, Charles of Magdeburg. Henry denied that Charles had bribed him, though he admitted that his advisers might have received money. Alexander II summoned the accused German bishops to Rome to investigate the matter, but he died two months later. On 22 April 1073, the Romans proclaimed Hildebrand as his successor.

Hildebrand, who assumed the name Gregory VII, did not seek Henry's confirmation. He did not immediately challenge royal prerogatives, but he believed that a ruler associated with excommunicated persons could not direct ecclesiastical affairs. He regarded lay investiture as the principal obstacle to reform and opposed royal appointments, acting upon complaints against German prelates. Henry's Italian chancellor, Bishop Gregory of Vercelli, and several German bishops urged him to reject Gregory's election as invalid, but the German dukes and Beatrice of Tuscany, Godfrey the Bearded's influential widow, persuaded him to cooperate with the papacy.

In early 1073, Bolesław II of Poland invaded Bohemia, prompting Henry to plan a punitive expedition. He summoned the Saxon nobles to Goslar, where they demanded redress of grievances; Henry refused and withdrew to Harzburg. Otto of Nordheim persuaded the Saxons to take up arms, forcing Henry to flee to Eschwege and enabling the rebels to capture Lüneburg. To save its commander, Henry released Magnus of Saxony, whom the rebels recognised as their duke. Lacking support from the princes and bishops, Henry saw his castles attacked. To prevent the Saxon bishops from seeking papal backing, Henry sent a letter of penance to Pope Gregory, admitting to selling church offices and attributing his faults to youthful arrogance and the influence of misguided advisers.

=== Negotiations and new conflicts ===
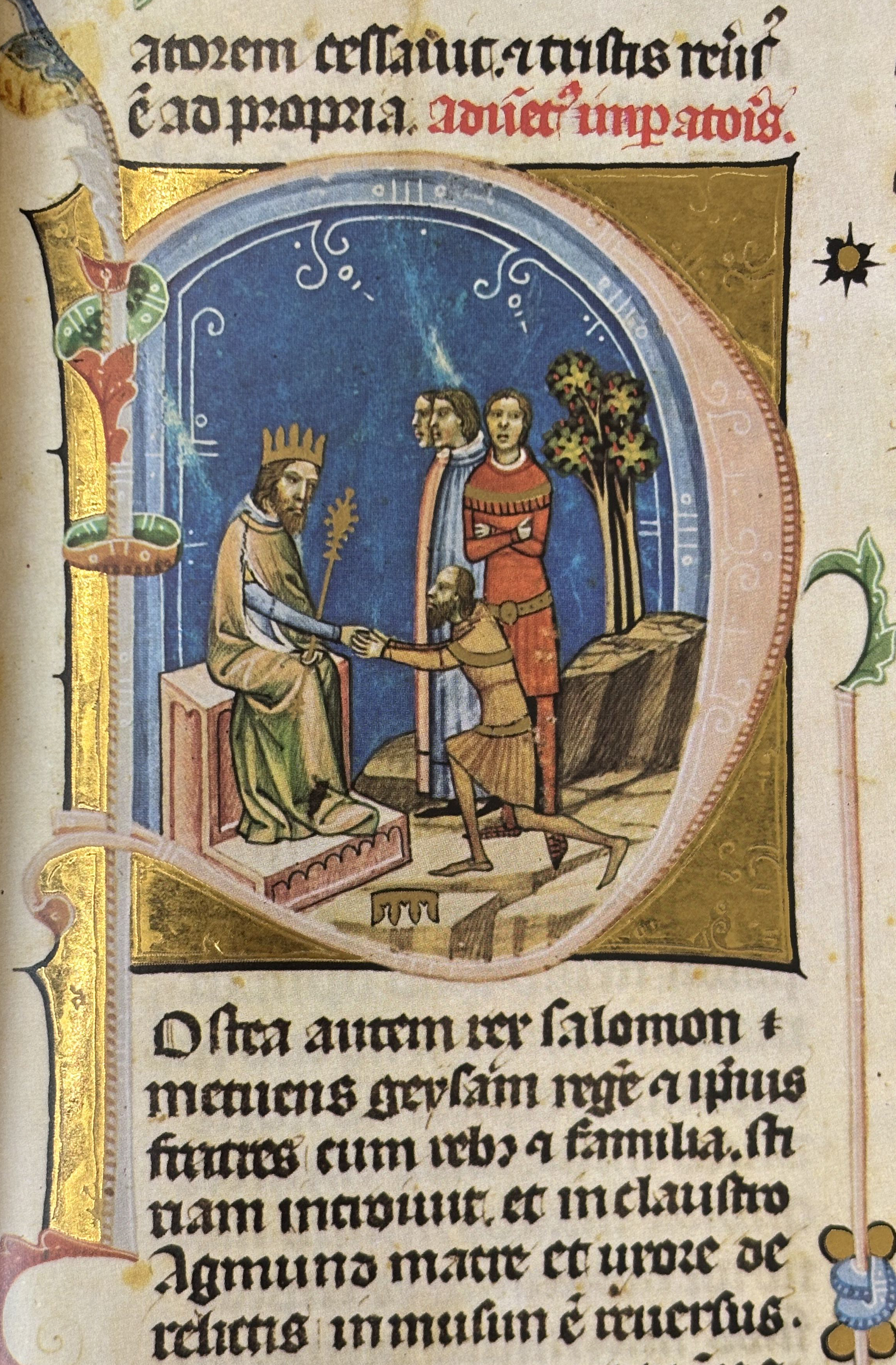
Henry's brother-in-law, King Solomon of Hungary, appeals to him for help (miniature in the 14th-century Vienna Illuminated Chronicle).

Siegfried of Mainz, Anno of Cologne, Rudolf of Rheinfelden, Berthold of Zähringen and other German magnates met the Saxon leaders at Gerstungen in October 1073. They attempted to persuade Henry to redress Saxon grievances, but he remained determined to suppress the revolt. A month later Henry's servant Regenger warned Rudolf and Berthold that Henry intended to kill them. Regenger died unexpectedly in January 1074, but his testimony intensified the conflict between Henry and the two dukes. After recovering from illness, Henry went to Worms, where Bishop Adalbert refused him entry until the townspeople expelled Adalbert and admitted Henry. The King rewarded the burghers by exempting them from customs duties, praising their loyalty when many princes opposed him.

In early 1074, Archbishops Liemar of Bremen and Udo of Trier, along with eight bishops, joined Henry at Worms. Their followers and the town militia formed a new army against the Saxons and Thuringians. Henry, now outnumbered, soon opened negotiations. The Treaty of Gerstungen, concluded on 2 February, granted the rebels' main demands: Henry would dismantle his castles and appoint only natives to offices in Saxony, while the Saxon aristocracy promised to destroy their new fortifications. Saxon peasants nevertheless seized and destroyed Harzburg and desecrated the royal graves there. This outrage provoked widespread indignation, and Henry regarded it as a breach of the treaty.

Pope Gregory dispatched Cardinals Gerald of Ostia and Hubert of Palestrina to negotiate with Henry. Empress Agnes accompanied the legates. After Henry performed public penance for selling church offices, the legates absolved him on 27 April 1074. They summoned the German bishops to a synod to hear the case against Bishop Herman I of Bamberg, but several failed to appear. Gregory responded by suspending Archbishop Liemar and summoning the others to Rome. Henry did not intervene, despite the fact that the accused bishops were among his principal supporters.

Henry's brother-in-law, Solomon of Hungary, appealed to him for support against his cousin Géza, Béla I's eldest son. After Géza defeated him on 14 March 1074, Solomon fled to the fortresses of Moson and Pressburg. In return for Henry's help in recovering his kingdom, Solomon offered to cede six castles and to recognise Henry's suzerainty. Henry invaded Hungary and advanced as far as Vác, but he failed to compel Géza's submission. Pope Gregory rebuked Solomon for accepting Henry’s overlordship, since he regarded Hungary as a fief of the Holy See.

=== Negotiations with the papacy and Saxon campaigns ===
On 7 December 1074, Pope Gregory asked Henry to compel the German prelates who had ignored his summons to attend a Roman synod. At the Lenten synod in February 1075, he suspended five German bishops for disobedience and blamed five of Henry's advisers, likely those who had been excommunicated by his predecessor, for the dispute over the see of Milan. Henry and the German bishops sought to avoid open conflict. Archbishops Siegfried of Mainz and Liemar of Bremen travelled to Rome to negotiate and did not oppose the deposition of Bishop Herman of Bamberg. Pleased with their obedience, the Pope authorised Siegfried to convene a reforming synod in Germany.

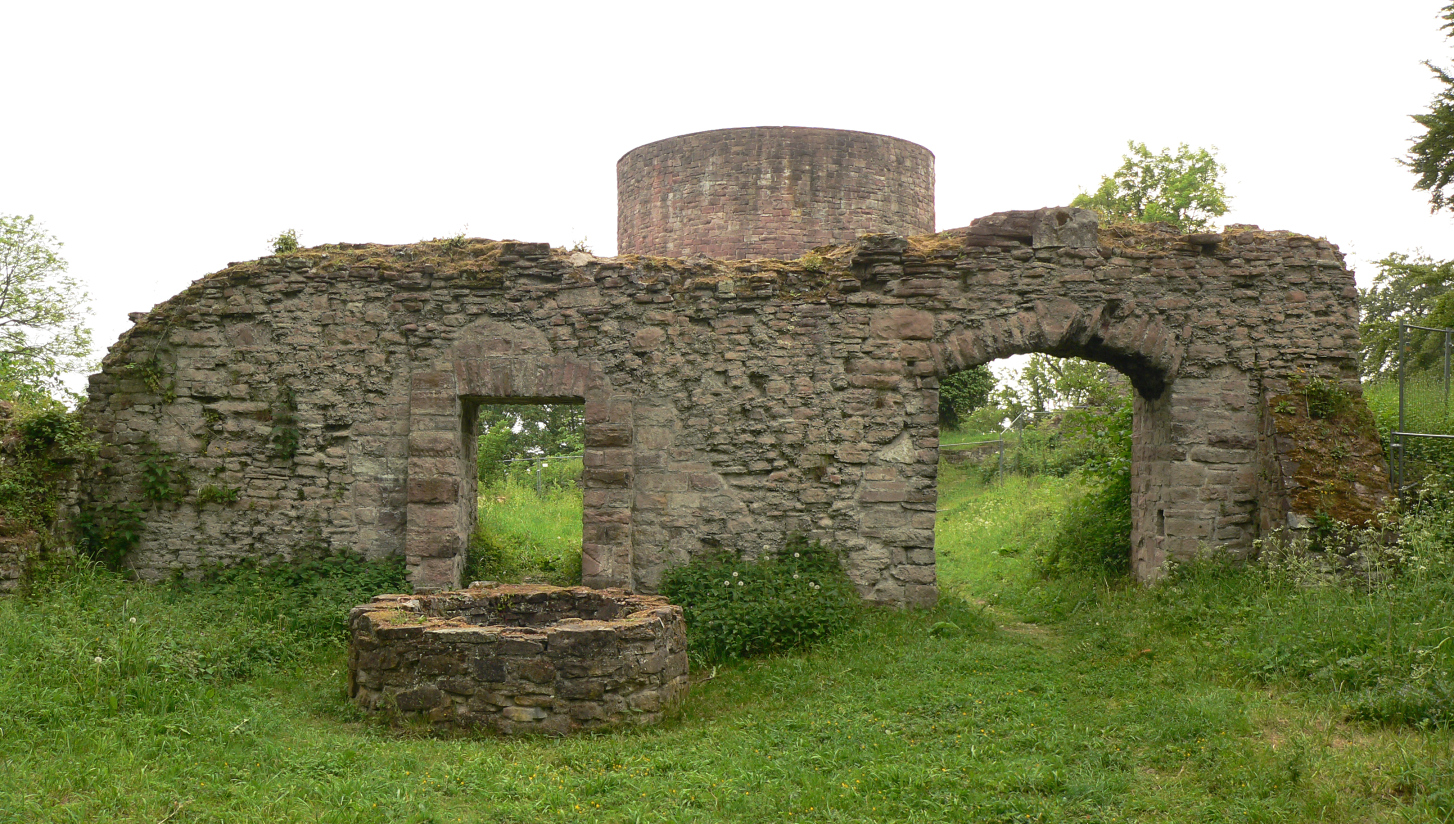
Ruins of Homburg Castle. Henry's army inflicted a decisive defeat on the Saxons near the castle in 1074.

Meanwhile, Henry prepared to avenge the desecration of the royal graves at Harzburg, offering amnesty and rewards to those who joined his campaign against Saxony. Most German dukes and many bishops assembled with the royal army at Breitungen in June 1074, and several Saxon nobles and prelates defected to Henry's side. Under Rudolf of Rheinfelden, the royal forces surprised the Saxons at Homburg Castle on 9 June. Although most Saxon nobles escaped, many foot soldiers were slaughtered. Survivors blamed their lords, and their accounts turned the Saxon peasantry against the nobility. Pope Gregory congratulated Henry, describing the Saxons' defeat as an act of "divine judgement".

Henry invaded Saxony again in autumn 1075. Godfrey the Hunchback, Duke of Lower Lorraine, was the only duke to support him, but Saxon resistance collapsed. Otto of Nordheim persuaded the Saxons to surrender unconditionally on 26 or 27 October. Henry restored Otto's benefices except Bavaria, but imprisoned other rebel leaders and confiscated their lands. He then summoned the German dukes to Goslar to swear fealty to his infant son Conrad, but only Vratislaus II of Bohemia complied.

=== Road to Canossa ===
Henry begging Matilda of Tuscany and Hugh of Cluny in Canossa Castle (miniature in an illuminated manuscript kept in the Vatican Library, 1115)

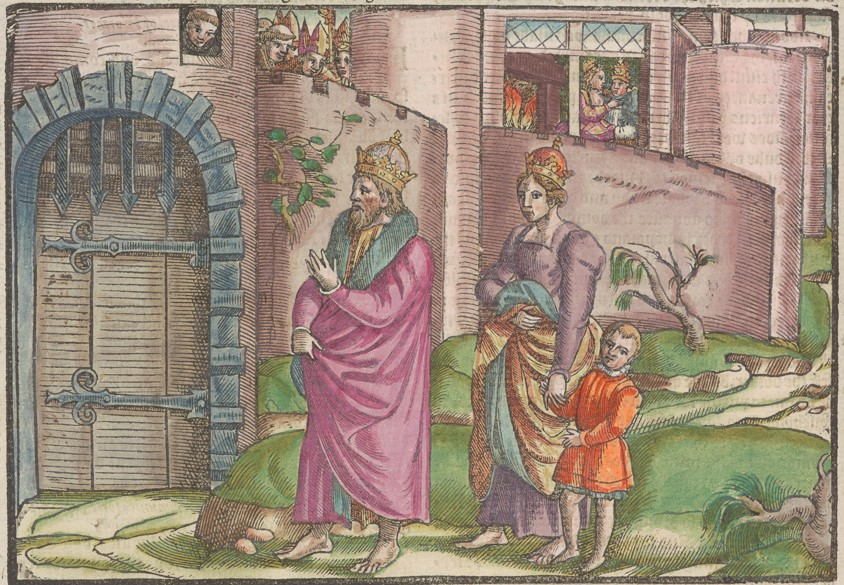
A depiction in Foxe's Book of Martyrs of Henry, inaccurately with his family, barefoot before Pope Gregory VII at Canossa Castle.

Henry's victory in the Saxon war had weakened his dependence on Pope Gregory VII. He sent Count Eberhard the Bearded to Italy as his representative, instructing him to demand an oath of fealty from the papal vassal Robert Guiscard, Duke of Apulia and Calabria. Henry also appointed his chaplain Tedald as archbishop of Milan, contrary to the Pope's former decisions. Alarmed, Gregory announced that he would excommunicate Henry unless he reversed his policy.

Henry interpreted Gregory's announcement as a denial of the sacred character of kingship. At a synod held in Worms on 24 January 1076, two archbishops, twenty-six bishops, and Godfrey the Hunchback declared Gregory's election invalid and demanded his abdication. A similar decision was taken by Lombard bishops and nobles at Piacenza on 5 February. Godfrey the Hunchback was murdered on 22 February; although he had named his nephew Godfrey of Bouillon as his heir, Henry granted Lower Lorraine to his own son Conrad.

Gregory VII learned of these acts at the Lenten synod in Rome and publicly excommunicated Henry, releasing his subjects from their oath of loyalty in a public prayer addressed to Saint Peter. Although unprecedented, the Pope regarded this as the only adequate response to Henry's arrogance. Henry convened a synod at Utrecht, but only the local bishop, William I, supported the excommunication of the Pope. Seeking to justify his position, Henry circulated a letter drafted by his chaplain Gottschalk, asserting that only God could judge a king, denouncing Gregory as a false monk, and commanding him to abdicate. Shortly afterwards, lightning destroyed Utrecht cathedral on 27 March, and Bishop William died suddenly on 27 April.

Henry's opponents interpreted these events as divine retribution for his sins. Bishop Herman of Metz released the Saxon rebels in his custody, while Bishop Burchard of Halberstadt escaped from captivity and returned to Saxony. Theoderic and William of the Saxon Wettin also returned from exile and joined the revolt. When Henry invaded Saxony in August, only Vratislaus II of Bohemia supported him. Their arrival provoked a general rising, forcing Henry to retreat to Bohemia. German nobles and bishops assembled at Trebur between 16 October and 1 November. They convinced Henry to accept the Pope's conditions: he was to dismiss his excommunicated advisers, recognise Gregory as the lawful pope, and accept papal jurisdiction in his disputes with the German dukes and bishops. They further declared that they would elect a new king if Henry did not obtain absolution within a year, and invited Gregory to Germany to preside over an assembly at Augsburg on 2 February 1077.

Henry withdrew to Speyer and lived there as a penitent. He then decided to seek absolution in Italy, in order to prevent the Pope from judging his case at an assembly controlled by his enemies. Despite an unusually harsh winter, the King, Queen Bertha, and their followers crossed the Mont Cenis pass across the Alps in December. On 25 January, they reached Canossa Castle, where Gregory had taken refuge fearing Henry's revenge. Henry stood barefoot in sackcloth before the castle for three days, until Matilda of Tuscany (the castle's owner), Bertha's mother Adelaide, and Hugh of Cluny persuaded the Pope to absolve him. Before receiving absolution, Henry promised to submit to the Pope’s judgement in his conflict with his subjects.

=== Civil war ===
Henry remained in Italy after his absolution, which surprised his German opponents. At an assembly in Forchheim, they argued that it had not restored their oaths of fealty, and on 14 March 1077 elected Rudolf of Rheinfelden king. Although the papal legates acknowledged the election, Gregory VII remained neutral, claiming the right to judge the dispute and summoning both Henry and Rudolf to an assembly in Germany. Henry replaced the new anti-king's chief ally, Berthold of Zähringen, with Liutold of Eppenstein as duke of Carinthia, awarded Friuli to Sigehard, Patriarch of Aquilea, confiscated Swabia from Rudolf and Bavaria from Welf, and placed both duchies under royal control. Before returning to Germany in April, Henry appointed his three-year-old son Conrad as his lieutenant in Italy, entrusting him to the excommunicated prelates Tedald of Milan and Denis of Piacenza. Unable to prevent his return, Rudolf withdrew to Saxony.

Henry toured the main cities of southern and western Germany to demonstrate the restoration of his authority and rewarded his supporters with confiscated estates, though these had to be secured by force. The rival kings' armies first approached one another near Würzburg in August, but Henry avoided battle as his forces were outnumbered. Aristocratic leaders sought peace and planned a joint assembly on the Rhine in November, which Henry obstructed by sending troops. On 12 November 1077 the papal legate Cardinal Bernard excommunicated Henry. Henry opened negotiations with the papacy through envoys, and a new (unnamed) papal legate later celebrated Easter with him at Cologne in 1078, implying Gregory did not consider the excommunication valid. Henry successfully campaigned in Lotharingia, but his supporters suffered defeats in Swabia and Franconia. Rudolf advanced to Franconia and met Henry and his army of 12,000 Franconian peasants at Mellrichstadt on 7 August 1078, where the battle ended without a decisive result.

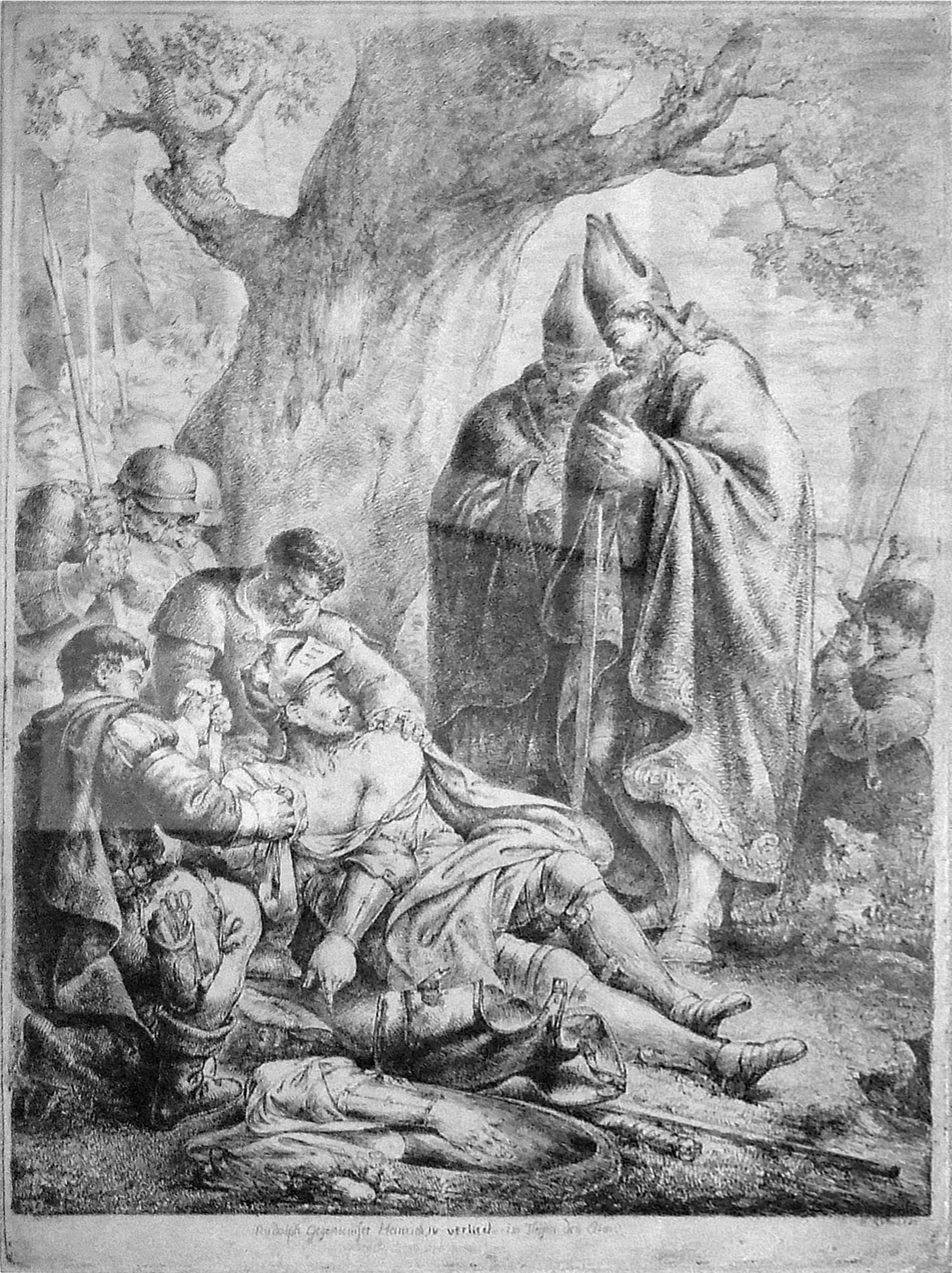
Rudolf of Rheinfelden dying after losing his right hand at the Battle of Hohenmölsen in 1080 (engraving by Bernhard Rode, 1781)

Gregory prohibited clerics from receiving royal appointments to bishoprics or abbeys in November 1078. Royal investiture had been a core element of royal administration, and the ring and crosier symbolised the mutual dependence of ruler and prelate. At the Lenten synod of February 1079, Henry's opponents persuaded the Pope to send new legates to Germany, although he forbade them to judge bishops appointed by Henry. In March, Henry confiscated Rudolf's Swabian estates and granted them to Bishop Burchard of Lausanne, and appointed a wealthy local aristocrat, Frederick of Büren, duke of Swabia. Frederick gained control only north of the Danube, while Rudolf's son Berthold held the southern regions.

Henry met the papal legates Peter of Albano and Udalric of Padua at Regensburg in May 1079, and they arranged negotiations with Rudolf at Fritzlar. The parties agreed to meet again at Würzburg, but Rudolf refused to appoint delegates, suspecting bribery. Henry invaded Saxony in August, but Rudolf secured a truce with the support of aristocrats loyal to Henry. Henry then undermined Rudolf's support in Saxony and assembled forces from the German duchies, Burgundy, and Bohemia. In January 1080, he invaded Saxony again, but Rudolf defeated him at the Battle of Flarchheim on 27 January. However, the Saxon deserters did not return to Rudolf's camp.

Henry sent envoys to the Roman synod of Lent demanding that Pope Gregory excommunicate Rudolf, hinting his willingness to appoint an antipope. Instead, Gregory excommunicated and deposed Henry and recognised Rudolf as king. A treatise, The Defence of King Henry, was published stressing Henry's hereditary right. It employed Roman-law arguments, reflecting the study of the Corpus juris civilis in Italy. Before returning, Henry's envoys, Archbishop Liemar of Bremen and Bishop Rupert of Bamberg, raised a revolt against the Pope's ally Matilda of Tuscany and secured the backing of northern Italian aristocrats. Henry's second excommunication proved less damaging than the first. At a council in Mainz in May 1080, German prelates and nobles deposed Gregory, claiming he had disrupted the natural order. In June a synod in Brixen said he was a heretic selling church offices and elected Archbishop Wibert of Ravenna pope as Clement III. Henry then returned to Germany and prepared a new campaign in Saxony.

Henry and Rudolf's armies met at Hohenmölsen on 14 October 1080. Although Henry's forces were defeated, Rudolf died from his wounds. Henry portrayed Rudolf's death as divine punishment for perjury and opened negotiations with the Saxons, offering to make his son Conrad king of Saxony, but Otto of Nordheim persuaded them to reject the proposal.

=== Imperial coronation ===
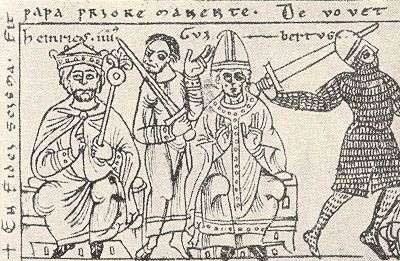
Henry IV (left) and Antipope Clement III (middle-right) during Henry's imperial coronation (from Otto of Freising's Chronicle or History of the Two Cities, 1157)

Henry led a small army to Italy in March 1081. His supporters' earlier victory over Matilda of Tuscany allowed him to reach Rome, but the Romans remained loyal to Gregory VII and forced him to withdraw to northern Italy. He negotiated with envoys of the Byzantine Emperor Alexios I Komnenos about an alliance against Robert Guiscard and released Lucca and Pisa from Matilda's lordship. While Henry was in Italy, the Saxons invaded Franconia and his southern German opponents elected Hermann of Salm king, although Saxon support for Hermann came only months later.

After a short visit to Germany, Henry returned to Italy in early 1082 and again besieged Rome without success, leaving Antipope Clement to continue the siege while he ravaged Matilda's lands. Fears of an invasion by Hermann kept him in the north, but he resumed the siege at the end of the year. Subsidies (144,000 gold pieces) from Alexios enabled him to bribe Roman aristocrats, capture the Leonine City in June 1083, and force Gregory to retreat to Castel Sant'Angelo. Henry then withdrew again, securing a secret agreement with Roman nobles to obtain his imperial coronation.

In early 1084, Henry campaigned briefly against Robert Guiscard. Meanwhile, after Clement won over many cardinals and officials, resistance collapsed, and Henry entered Rome in March. Clement crowned him emperor in St Peter's Basilica on 1 April. After six weeks, Henry departed before Guiscard arrived to rescue Gregory. The Norman troops then sacked Rome and drove Gregory to Salerno. Henry ordered his allies to conquer Matilda's lands, but they were defeated at the Battle of Sorbara in July 1084.

== Reign as emperor ==
=== Consolidation ===
Pope Gregory VII repeated Henry's excommunication in late 1084, but many of the Pope's former supporters paid homage to Henry as emperor at Cologne at Christmas. His supporters and opponents met at a joint conference on the river Werra on 20 January 1085, but no compromise was reached. During the meeting, Theoderic II of Katlenburg and Bishop Udo of Hildesheim, both Saxons, entered secret negotiations with Henry. However, the Saxons, hostile to Henry, soon murdered Theoderic and forced Udo to flee from Saxony. On his advice, Henry pledged respect for Saxon liberties, prompting many rebels to lay down their arms.

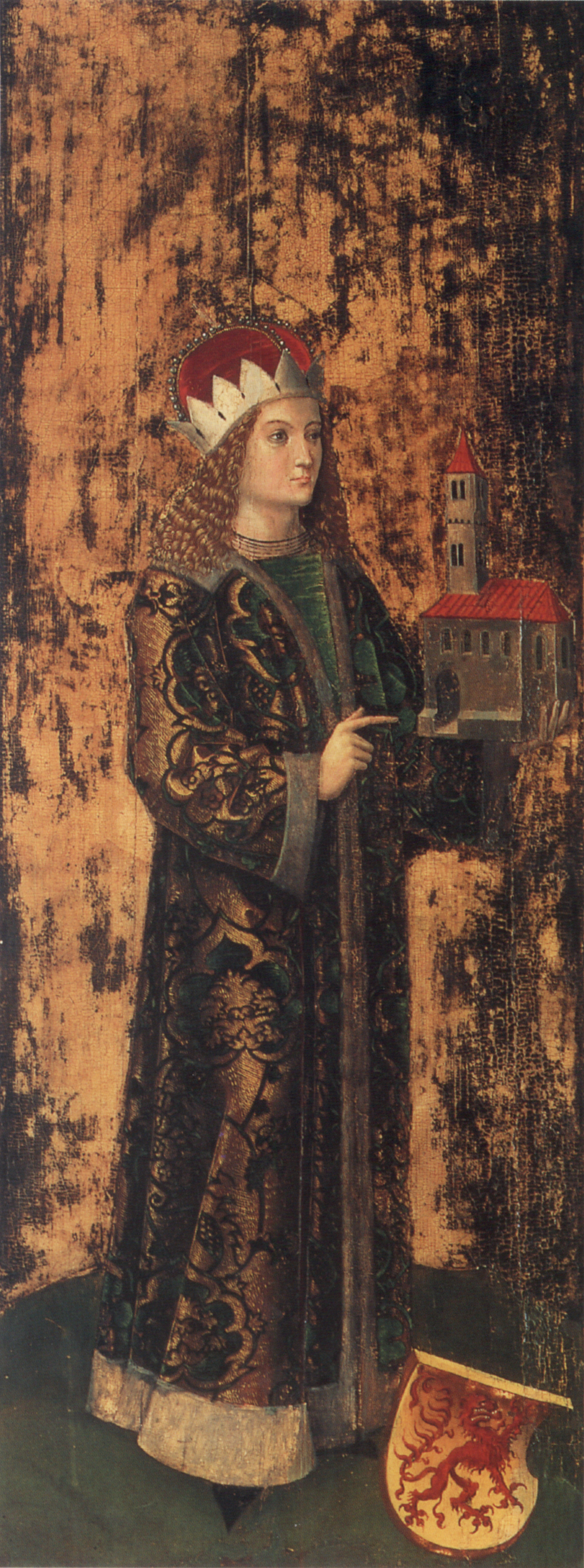
Welf, Duke of Bavaria—a wealthy German aristocrat with flexible loyalties during Henry's conflicts with the Papacy (a late-15th-century painting)

The papal legate, Cardinal Odo of Ostia, summoned German prelates loyal to Pope Gregory to a synod at Quedlinburg, which declared papal judgements unquestionable and forbade contact with the excommunicated. In response, Henry convened a general assembly in Mainz in late April or early May. Nearly twenty archbishops and bishops attended and deposed prelates who had ignored the summons. The synod also proclaimed the "Peace of God" in Germany, banning armed conflict during major Christian festivals. Henry rewarded his loyal supporter, Vratislaus II, with the title of king of Bohemia.

Pope Gregory died in Salerno on 25 May 1085, and Henry used his rival's death to consolidate power. He travelled to Lower Lorraine to settle a dispute between Bishops Theoderic of Verdun and Henry of Liège. Henry also granted the County of Verdun to Godfrey of Bouillon and compensated Theoderic with lands confiscated from Matilda of Tuscany, though peace remained fragile. Henry then invaded Saxony in July, reaching Magdeburg. Archbishop Hartwig of Magdeburg, his three suffragans, and Hermann of Salm fled to Denmark. The Saxons paid homage, but Henry kept confiscated estates and appointed new officials. Renewed rebellion followed, forcing Henry to withdraw. A further campaign in early 1086 proved inconclusive, and Henry withdrew to Regensburg, where Welf of Bavaria besieged him until his supporters intervened.

Henry's Bavarian, Swabian, and Saxon opponents laid siege to Würzburg in July 1086 to secure uninterrupted communication. Henry attempted to lift the siege, but his army was defeated at the Battle of Pleichfeld on 11 August. He then launched a campaign against his Bavarian enemies. In February 1087, Bavarian and Swabian aristocrats from both sides met at Oppenheim to restore peace, though Henry did not attend. Instead, he went to Aachen, where his son Conrad was crowned co-ruler on 30 May. Around this time, Henry likely rewarded Godfrey of Bouillon with the Duchy of Lower Lorraine. German prelates and aristocrats met again at Speyer in August 1087. Henry's opponents offered homage if he were absolved by the Pope, but Henry refused, insisting his excommunication was unlawful. Meanwhile, the new pope Victor III held a synod at Benevento, which passed no judgement on Henry, indicating a conciliatory approach.

Illness prevented Henry from invading Saxony in October, but after recovering, he campaigned against the rebels. Egbert II of Brunswick began negotiating surrender, and Henry offered him the Margravate of Meissen. Encouraged by promises from Saxon prelates to secure his election as king, Egbert resumed resistance, but when these promises failed, he swore fealty to Henry in early 1088. Egbert's reversal and the death of Bishop Burchard hastened the collapse of the Saxon rebels. Archbishop Hartwig and other Saxon leaders soon paid homage, and Henry appointed Hartwig as his lieutenant in Saxony. Isolated and ill, Hermann of Salm received Henry's permission to leave Saxony and died in Lorraine in September 1088. Egbert rebelled again, defeating Henry's forces near Gleichen in December, but his estates were confiscated in early 1089. Henry, who had been widowed, went to Cologne to marry Eupraxia of Kiev in the summer of 1089, then returned to Saxony in autumn to counter Egbert, who continued his resistance.

=== Return to Italy ===
Henry opened negotiations with his Bavarian and Swabian opponents, who were prepared to surrender if Antipope Clement III were deposed. Although Henry considered accepting their terms, his bishops discouraged him, fearing their own removal. To block further talks, the new pope Urban II arranged a marriage alliance in autumn 1089 between Welf I of Bavaria's 18-year-old son, Welf the Fat, and the 43-year-old Matilda of Tuscany. Henry then decided to invade Matilda's lands. Around this time, the Jews of Speyer and Worms sought confirmation of their privileges. Henry issued diplomas safeguarding their liberties and protecting them from violence and forced baptism, likely in return for financial support, as he was often in need of cash.

Henry invaded Matilda’s domains in March 1090, forcing her into refuge in the mountains. In July, Egbert of Brunswick was killed by the retainers of Henry's sister, Abbess Adelaide II of Quedlinburg. His death effectively ended Saxon resistance, and Henry appointed Egbert's brother-in-law, Henry of Nordheim, as his chief representative in Saxony. The Emperor continued his Italian campaign, capturing Matilda's fortresses north of the river Po by late 1091. After crossing the river in June 1092, he forced Matilda into negotiations, but she refused to recognise Clement III. Henry then besieged Canossa, but a surprise attack by the garrison compelled him to abandon the siege in October.

Meanwhile, the Swabians elected Berthold of Rheinfelden's brother-in-law, Berthold II of Zähringen, as their duke. The new duke declared himself a vassal of the Holy See. Henry was forced to send his German troops back to confront unrest in Swabia and Bavaria. His attempt to secure an alliance with King Ladislaus I of Hungary failed, and he withdrew to Pavia, allowing Matilda's forces to recapture her fortresses.

=== Family feuds ===
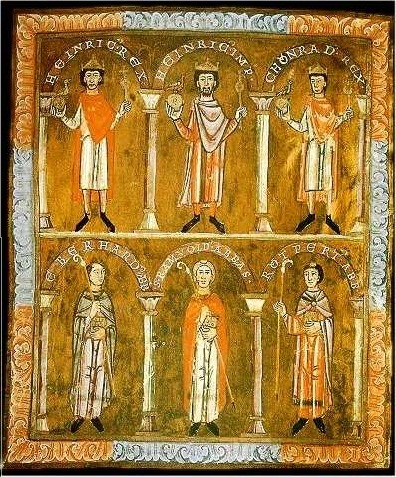
Henry and his two sons, Henry and Conrad (upper line) (from the 11th-century Evangelion of Saint Emmeram's Abbey)

Matilda of Tuscany and Welf the Fat turned Henry's heir, Conrad, against him in 1093. Although Henry had Conrad captured, he escaped to Milan. Bernold of Constance later claimed Henry attempted suicide after his son's rebellion, though this story is probably invented to make a comparison between Henry and King Saul. Conrad's defection made Henry suspicious of his relatives, and he placed Empress Eupraxia under strict supervision, allegedly for infidelity. Several Lombard towns allied with Matilda, forcing Henry to flee to Verona, where only a few supporters remained. His authority was confined to north-eastern Italy, and Matilda's and Welf I's forces blocked his return to Germany.

In early 1094, Eupraxia deserted Henry with Matilda's help and accused her husband of debauchery and group rape. She repeated these charges publicly before Pope Urban II at the Council of Piacenza in March 1095. Urban endorsed her words and recognised Conrad as the lawful king in April. Although Henry's enemies spread Eupraxia's accusations, modern scholars view them as propaganda, probably fabricated by Matilda's advisors. Urban's position weakened when Welf the Fat left Matilda, and his father, Welf I, soon sought reconciliation with Henry. In June 1095, Henry renewed a commercial treaty with Doge Vitale Faliero in Venice, securing an annual tribute.

In November 1095, Urban II proclaimed the First Crusade at the Council of Clermont. The council also banned bishops and abbots from swearing fealty to secular rulers. Early crusader bands departed in 1096 and massacred thousands of Rhineland Jews. The Jewish communities appealed to Henry for protection, and although he ordered bishops and nobles to defend them, these measures often failed to stop the violence.

=== Restoration ===
Welf of Bavaria's father, Adalbert Azzo II of Este, mediated a reconciliation between his son and Henry in early 1096. The Emperor restored Bavaria to Welf, who lifted the blockade of the Alpine passes, allowing Henry to return to Germany in May. Former rebels paid homage to Henry at assemblies in Regensburg, Nuremberg, and Mainz. He permitted Jews who had been forcibly converted to return to Judaism. In early 1098, Berthold II of Zähringen was also reconciled with Henry, who exempted his lands from Swabian ducal authority and granted him the hereditary title of duke.

German magnates and prelates deposed Henry's rebellious son Conrad and elected his younger brother, 12-year-old Henry V, as co-ruler in May 1098. Conrad, deserted by his allies, later died in Tuscany. In Mainz, the Emperor ordered an investigation into Jewish property stolen during the crusader massacres; testimony implicated Archbishop Ruthard of Mainz and his relatives, who fled and began plotting against the Emperor. At Easter 1099, the new duke of Bohemia Bretislav II met Henry in Regensburg and secured imperial approval for his brother Bořivoj's succession. Bořivoj was invested with Bohemia in April, marking the first time a Bohemian duke received investiture in the German manner. Henry then focused on restoring public order, holding assemblies and instructing magnates to suppress crime.

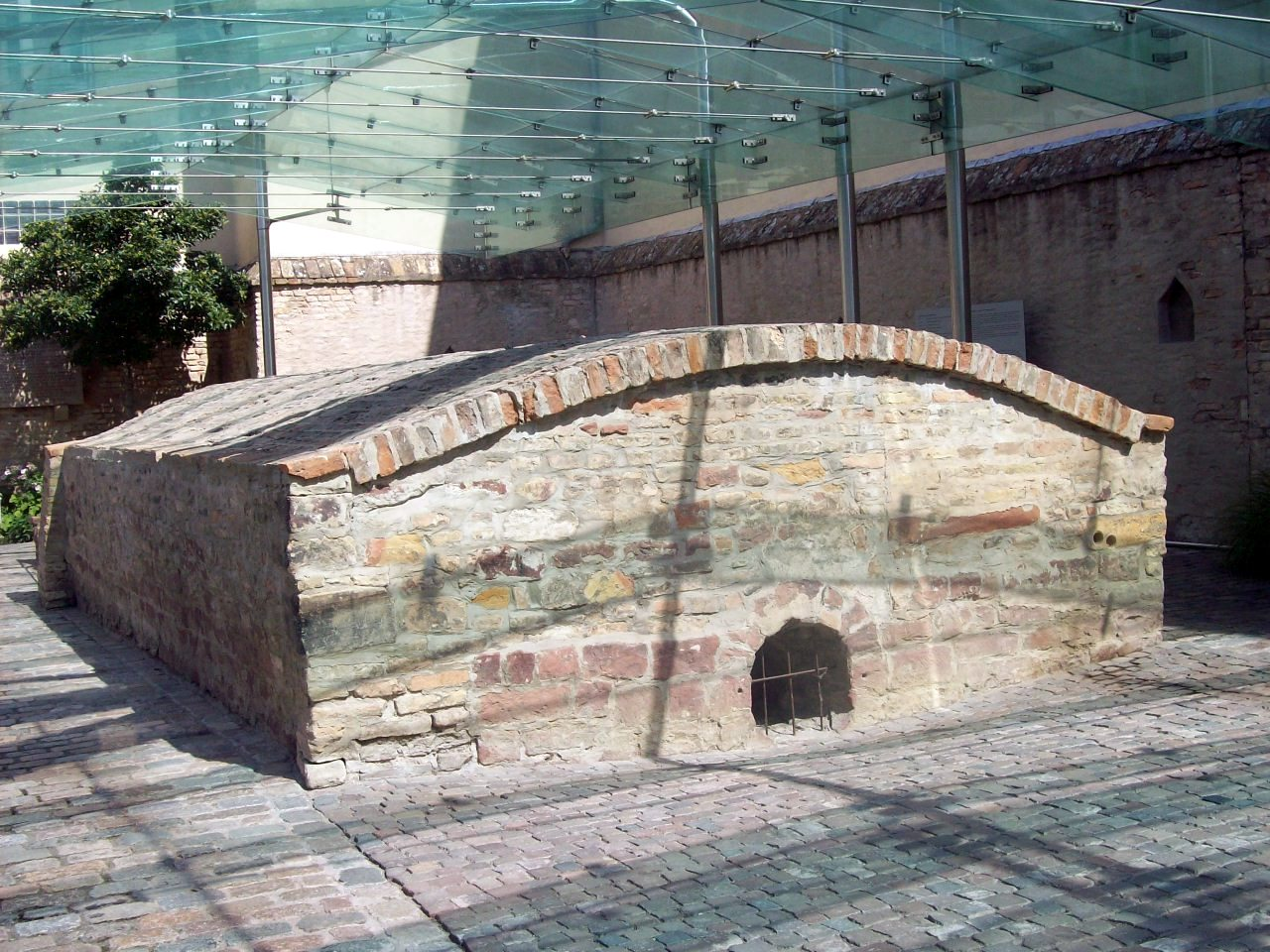
Mikveh (Jewish ritual bath) in Speyer. Henry summarised the local Jews' liberties in a diploma in 1090.

Antipope Clement III died in September 1100, and his followers elected Theoderic of Albano, whom Henry's Italian supporters recognised, though Henry himself remained distant. Count Henry of Limburg seized property of Prüm Abbey, but the Emperor besieged Limburg, forcing the count to surrender. He was later pardoned and appointed duke of Lower Lorraine. In late 1101, German leaders urged Henry to reconcile with Pope Paschal II, but there is no evidence he did so. Paschal sought to weaken Henry, instructing his legate Gebhard of Constance to maintain resistance in Germany, and a papal synod reaffirmed Henry's excommunication in April.

Robert II of Flanders allied with Bishop Manasses of Cambrai, whom the Pope supported, against Walcher, Henry's appointee as bishop of Cambrai. Robert besieged the city, but Henry relieved Walcher and forced Robert to lift the siege in October 1102. After Henry's departure, however, Robert soon renewed hostilities. On 6 January 1103, Henry held a general assembly in Mainz and proclaimed the Reichsfriede (imperial peace) for the first time, banning feuds and violence throughout the empire. He threatened violators with mutilation, rejecting the option of monetary penance for the wealthy.

Henry also announced plans for a crusade to the Holy Land and wrote to Hugh of Cluny, explaining his intention to restore peace and justice to the Church. His correspondence suggests he sought reconciliation, but Pope Paschal II regarded Henry as a major heretic and granted Robert II of Flanders remission of sins for fighting the Emperor's supporters. Fearing the loss of his imperial fiefs, Robert eventually swore fealty to Henry in Liège in June 1103.

=== Fall ===
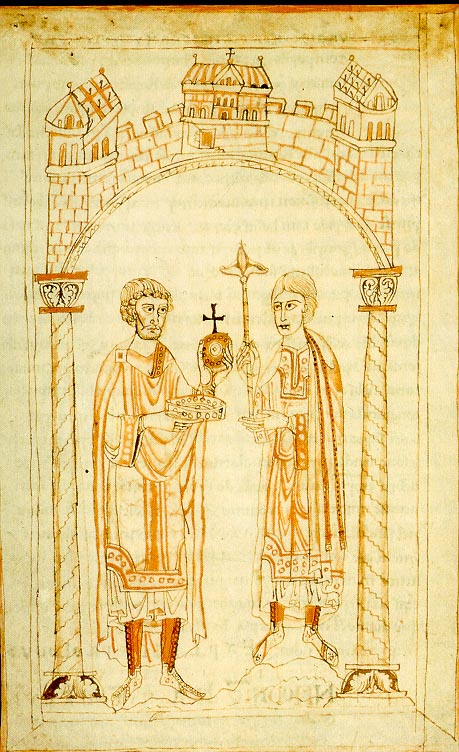
Henry IV abdicates in favour of his son Henry V (from the early-12th-century Chronicle of Ekkehard of Aura).

In January 1104, the Bavarian count Sigehard of Burghausen publicly criticised Henry for favouring Saxon and Franconian aristocrats. His large retinue aroused Henry's suspicions, but after Sigehard dismissed his followers, he was murdered on 4 February by ministeriales and burghers, probably in revenge for an earlier arbitration. Although Sigehard's relatives blamed Henry for failing to protect him, the Emperor denied responsibility.

Archbishop Hartwig of Magdeburg died in autumn 1104. His relatives travelled to Henry's court to secure the archbishopric for his nephew Hartwig, but Count Theoderic III of Katlenburg arrested them. Henry launched a punitive campaign, which ended abruptly when his 18-year-old son deserted him in December. The younger Henry later claimed his rebellion was caused by his father's unresolved excommunication, though his nearly contemporaneous biography claims that he wanted to secure the aristocrats' support before his ailing father's death to avoid a succession crisis. Bavarian nobles rallied to him, and Pope Paschal II absolved him early in 1105. Henry's attempts at negotiation failed.

Most Swabian and eastern Franconian nobles joined the rebellion, and the younger Henry gained Saxon support in April 1105. He unsuccessfully campaigned against Mainz, while his father briefly regained Würzburg, though his authority was rapidly declining. After Frederick of Büren's death, the younger Henry took control of Swabia. Leopold III of Austria and Bořivoj II of Bohemia deserted the Emperor, though Bořivoj soon repented and aided Henry's flight. Desperate, Henry appealed unsuccessfully to his son for compromise.

Henry returned toward Mainz to defend himself before an assembly convened by his son. Despite promises of safe conduct, he was captured at a meeting at Koblenz in December and imprisoned at Böckelheim, where he was forced to surrender the royal insignia. Although Mainz remained loyal to Henry, his son held an assembly at Ingelheim where Henry abdicated on 31 December.

== Last year ==
After his abdication, Henry stayed in Ingelheim, but fled to Cologne in early February 1106 after learning that his son planned to imprison or execute him. The townspeople received him with great respect, though Henry refused ceremonial honours as an act of penance. With the help of Bishop Othbert of Liège, he secured the support of Henry of Limburg, mediated a reconciliation with Albert III of Namur, and gained promises of assistance from Robert II of Flanders. Henry wrote to Hugh of Cluny, his son, the German princes, and King Philip I of France, expressing his determination to regain the throne.

The younger Henry invaded Lorraine, but his forces were defeated by his father's supporters at Visé in March 1106. Henry V then besieged Cologne but withdrew after several weeks. The deposed emperor accused his son of treachery in letters to the princes, but soon fell ill and died in Liège on 7 August. Before his death, he asked his son to pardon his followers and to bury him in Speyer Cathedral. Because he was excommunicated, Henry was first buried in Liège Cathedral, then reinterred in unconsecrated ground. In August, his son ordered the transfer of the body to Speyer despite local resistance. The sarcophagus was placed in an unconsecrated chapel until, five years later, Pope Paschal II permitted Henry IV's burial beside his father, Henry III, in Speyer Cathedral on 7 August 1111.

== Legacy ==
Henry's conflicts with his subjects, both sons, his wives, and the popes gave rise to a rich polemical literature during his lifetime. Both his supporters and his opponents based their portraits of Henry on two early medieval works: The Twelve Abuses contained a discussion about legitimate kingship, while Isidore of Seville's Etymologiae contrasted kingship with tyranny. Consequently, polemical literature tended to provide a list of the characteristics of either good or wicked rulers when portraying Henry. For instance, in the 1080s, the Song of the Saxon War praised him as a highly pious king who defended the widows and the poor and gave laws to the lawless Saxons. The Vita Heinrici IV imperatoris, an anonymous biography completed in the early 1110s, described him as a vigorous and warlike monarch who employed learned officials and enjoyed conversations about spiritual themes and the liberal arts. In contrast, Lambert of Hersfeld stated Henry had inherited a peaceful realm, but he "rendered it filthy, despicable, bloodstained, a prey to internal conflicts". Lambert also emphasised that Henry destroyed and robbed churches and put freemen into servitude.

Rumours of Henry's immorality established his bad reputation for centuries. The Saxons were the first to accuse him of debauchery and demanded he dismiss the "swarm of concubines with whom he slept". Polemical writings spreading in Germany after 1085 accused him of incest and pederasty, also claiming that he had fathered illegitimate children. Isidore of Seville listed immoral sexual practices among the characteristics of tyrants. Consequently, as Robinson emphasises, allegations of Henry's alleged sexual misconduct "provided his opponents with a useful polemical weapon".

Henry was not a successful military commander, primarily because he did not avoid pitched battles, in contrast with most 11th-century military leaders. He could likely adopt this high-risk strategy because he often mustered his troops from among merchants and peasants who were regarded as expendable. He lost most of his major battles; his contemporaries primarily attributed his sole victory at Homburg to Rudolf of Rheinfelden. On the other hand, Henry's adaptability and openness to compromise and his preference for dilatory tactics enabled him to survive most crises of his reign.

Henry's penitential "Walk to Canossa" developed into a powerful metaphor. Catholic clerics were the first to adopt it, regarding it as the symbol of the triumph of the Holy See over an immoral monarch. For 19th-century Protestant German nationalists, the Gang nach Canossa ("Road to Canossa") symbolized the humiliation of Germany by a haughty pope. Otto von Bismarck proudly declared before the Reichstag that "Don't worry, we are not going to Canossa, neither physically nor spiritually!" during his campaign against political Catholicism on 14 May 1872. Historians have adopted more sophisticated approaches. They emphasize that penance and reconciliation were integral parts of medieval life, so an anointed king's excommunication was more disturbing for Henry's contemporaries than his act of penance at Canossa. Henry, as the philologist Herbert Schutz concludes, "cleverly maneuvered the pope into a position in which he had to absolve him", but Gregory VII reduced him "from Vicar of Christ to being a mere layman".

The Investiture Controversy continued after Henry's death. Bishop Ivo of Chartres and his pupil Hugh of Fleury had paved the road to a compromise already in Henry's lifetime. They actually adopted an old view, condemned by reformist clerics, making a distinction between the secular possessions and properties of bishoprics and abbeys (temporalities), and the ecclesiastical authority and sacramental powers of the bishops and abbots (spiritualities). In 1122, Henry V and Pope Calixtus II included a similar distinction in their Concordat of Worms, whereby the Emperor renounced the right to install the prelates in their ecclesiastical offices with ring and staff in return for the right to invest them with their secular possessions using the sceptre. However, the German monarchs' right to acquire a dead prelate's treasury, introduced by Henry, remained an important source of wealth, especially during the reigns of Frederick Barbarossa and Henry VI in the second half of the 12th century.

== Family ==
Henry's first wife, Bertha of Savoy, was a year younger than he. Until 5 August 1068, Henry regularly mentioned her as "consort of our kingdom and our marriage-bed" in his diplomas. Her disappearance from the diplomas was the sign of a growing disaffection. Henry sought a divorce at a general assembly in June 1069, stating their marriage had not been consummated. The assembled German aristocrats referred his request to a synod, which passed the matter to the Holy See in early October. Pope Alexander II said he would crown Henry only if Henry abandoned his plan. Henry obeyed and Bertha was again mentioned regularly in his diplomas from 26 October 1069. She died on 27 December 1087.

Bertha gave birth to five children, but two of them—Adelaide and Henry—died in infancy. Her surviving children were:

- Agnes, who was born in 1072 or 1073, married Frederick of Büren and then Leopold III of Austria;
- Conrad, who rose up against Henry, was born in 1074;
- Henry, who dethroned his father, was born in 1086.

The Morkinskinna—the earliest Icelandic chronicle of the Norwegian kings—refers to a daughter of an emperor (who must have been identical with Henry for chronological reasons), called Mathilde. According to this source, Magnus III of Norway exchanged messages with her and also composed a stanza for her. Other primary sources do not list Mathilde among Henry's children.

Henry's second wife, Eupraxia (known as Adelaide in Germany), was born around 1068. She was the daughter of Vsevolod I, Grand Prince of Kiev, but it was her first marriage to Henry of Stade, Margrave of the Nordmark, that made her an ideal spouse for Henry IV. Henry of Stade had been a wealthy Saxon aristocrat and his widow's marriage to the Emperor contributed to his reconciliation with the Saxons. Henry and Eupraxia were engaged in 1088. Eupraxia never gained Henry's confidence and was mentioned in only one of his diplomas. After their separation, she returned to Kyiv, where she died on 10 July 1109.

Henry's family

SALIANS
Adelaide of Susa †1091; Margravine of Turin	Otto †1057–60; Count of Savoy	Gunhilda of Denmark* †1038	Henry III; *1017 †1056; Holy Roman Emperor (r. 1046–1056)	Agnes of Poitou †1077
Adelaide; *1045 †1096; Abbess of Quedlinburg and Gandersheim (r. 1061–1096)	Adelaide of Savoy †1079	Rudolf of Rheinfelden †1080; Antiking to Henry IV (r. 1078–1080)	Matilda; *1048 †1060	Bertha of Savoy; *1051 †1087	HENRY IV; *1050 †1106; Holy Roman Emperor (r. 1084–1105)	Eupraxia of Kiev *c. 1068 †1109	Conrad; *1052 †1055; Duke of Bavaria (r. 1054–1055)	Solomon; *1053 †1087; King of Hungary (r. 1063–1074)	Judith †1092/96	Władysław I Herman *c. 1044 †1102; Duke of Poland (r. 1079–1102)
Berthold of Rheinfelden †1090; Antiduke of Swabia (r. 1079–1090)	Berthold of Zähringen †1111; Antiduke of Swabia (r. 1092–1098)	Agnes of Rheinfelden †1111	Frederick of Büren *c. 1050 †1105; Duke of Swabia (r. 1079–1105)	Agnes; *1072/73 †1143	Leopold III; *1073 †1136; Margrave of Austria (r. 1095–1136)	Maximilla of Sicily	Conrad; *1074 †1101; Antiking to Henry IV (r. 1095–1101)	Henry V *1086 †1125; Holy Roman Emperor (r. 1111–1125)	Matilda of England; *1102 †1167
HOHENSTAUFENS	BABENBERGS

*Gunhilda's daughter by Emperor Henry III, Beatrix, is not displayed. She was Abbess of Quedlinburg and Gandersheim until her death in 1061.

== See also ==
- Family tree of German monarchs
- Henry IV, a 1922 play by Luigi Pirandello

== Sources ==
- Andersson, Theodore M.; Gade, Kari Ellen (2012). Morkinskinna: The Earliest Icelandic Chronicle of the Norwegian Kings (1030–1157). Cornell University Press. ISBN 978-1-5017-2061-1.
- Barber, Malcolm (2004) [1992]. The Two Cities: Medieval Europe 1050–1320. University of Pennsylvania Press. ISBN 0-415-17414-7.
- Blumenthal, Uta-Renate (2010) [1982]. The Investiture Controversy: Church and Monarchy from the Ninth to the Twelfth Century. University of Pennsylvania Press. ISBN 978-0-8122-1386-7.
- Chazan, Robert (2006). The Jews of Medieval Western Christendom: 1000–1500. Cambridge medieval textbooks. University of Pennsylvania Press. ISBN 978-0-521-84666-0.
- Fuhrmann, Horst (2001) [1986]. Germany in the High Middle Ages, c. 1050–1200. Cambridge medieval textbooks. Cambridge University Press. ISBN 0-521-31980-3.
- Hill, Boyd H. (2020) [1972]. Medieval Monarchy in Action: The German Empire from Henry I to Henry IV. Routledge Library Editions: The Medieval World. Vol. 21. Routledge. ISBN 978-0-429-26124-4.
- Leyser, K.J. (1982). Medieval Germany and its Neighbours: 1000–1500. History. Vol. 12. The Hambledon Press. ISBN 0-907628-08-7.
- McLaughlin, Megan (2010). Sex, Gender, and Episcopal Authority in an Age of Reform, 1000–1122. Cambridge University Press. ISBN 978-0-521-87005-4.
- Pflanze, Otto (1990). Bismarck and the Development of Germany, Volume II: The Period of Consolidation, 1871–1880. Princeton Legacy Library. Princeton University Press. ISBN 0-691-05588-2.
- Robinson, I. S. (2003) [1999]. Henry IV of Germany, 1056–1106. Cambridge University Press. ISBN 0-521-54590-0.
- Schutz, Herbert (2010). The Medieval Empire in Central Europe: Dynastic Continuity in the Post-Carolingian Frankish Realm, 900–1300. Cambridge Scholars Publishing. ISBN 978-1-4438-1966-4.
- Tabacco, Giovanni (1995). "Northern and central Italy". In Luscombe, David Edward; Riley-Smith, Jonathan (eds.). The New Cambridge Medieval History. Vol. IV: c. 1024–c. 1198, Part II. Cambridge University Press. pp. 72–92. ISBN 978-0521414111.
- Vollrath, Hanna (1995). "The Western Empire under the Salians". In Luscombe, David Edward; Riley-Smith, Jonathan (eds.). The New Cambridge Medieval History. Vol. IV: c. 1024–c. 1198, Part II. Cambridge University Press. pp. 38–71. ISBN 978-0521414111.
- Zupka, Dušan (2016). Ritual and Symbolic Communication in Medieval Hungary under the Árpád Dynasty (1000–1301). East Central and Eastern Europe in the Middle Ages, 450–1450. Vol. 39. Brill. ISBN 978-90-04-31467-2.

Henry IV, Holy Roman Emperor Salian dynasty Born: 1050 Died: 1106
Regnal titles
Preceded by Henry III	German King; 1054–1105	Succeeded by Henry V
Preceded by Henry III	King of Italy; 1056–1105	Succeeded by Henry V
Preceded by Henry III	King of Burgundy; 1056–1105	Succeeded by Henry V
Preceded by Henry III	Holy Roman Emperor; 1084–1105	Succeeded by Henry V
Preceded by Conrad I	Duke of Bavaria; 1052–1054	Succeeded by Conrad II
Preceded by Welf I	Duke of Bavaria; 1078–1096	Succeeded by Welf I
