= Lambert of Hersfeld =

11th-century German chronicler

Lambert of Hersfeld (also called Lampert or Lampert of Aschaffenburg; c. 1028 – 1082/85) was a medieval chronicler. His work represents a major source for the history of the German kingdom of Henry IV and the incipient Investiture Controversy in the eleventh century.

== Life ==
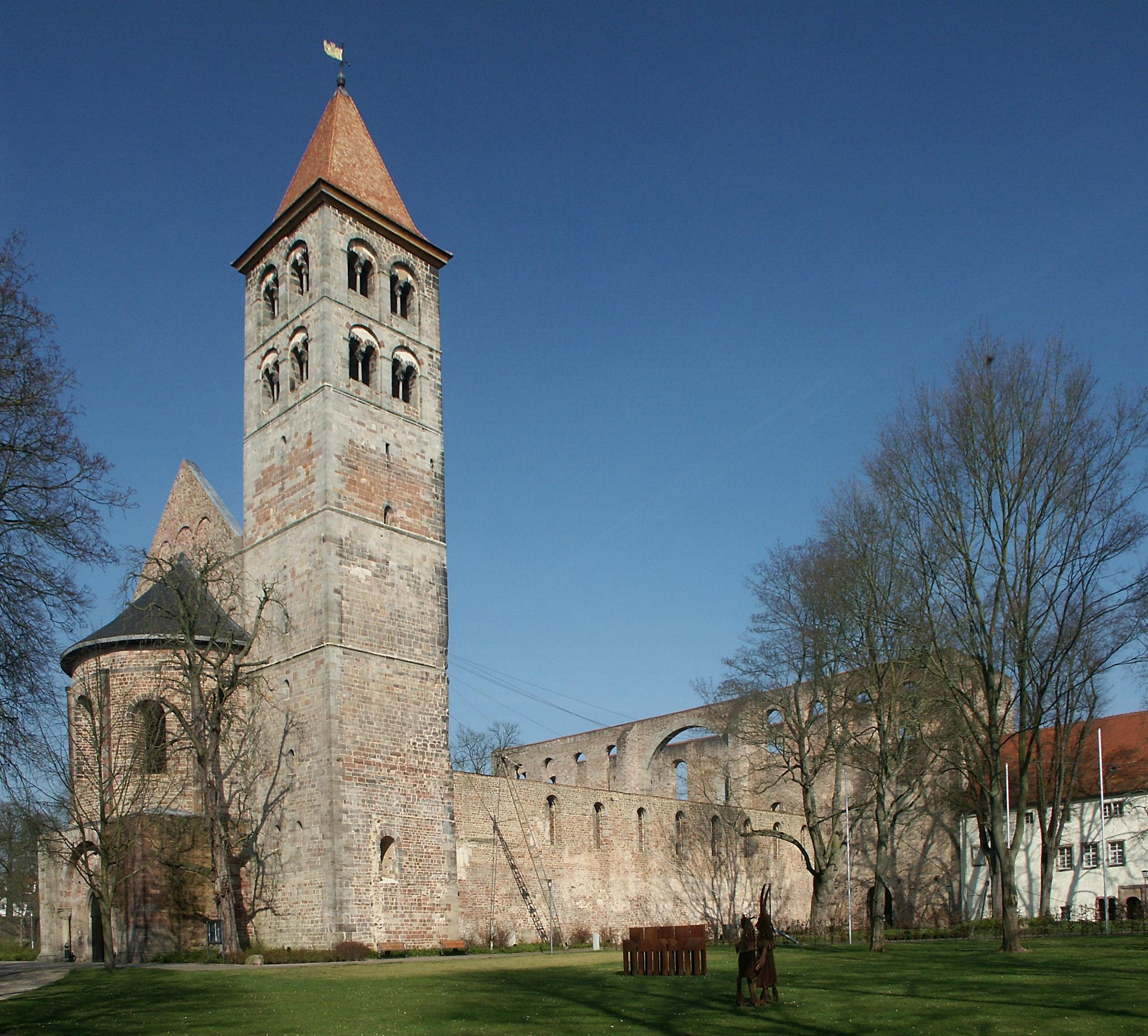
Hersfeld monastery church

What little is known of his life is revealed in scattered details from his own historical writings. Probably a Franconian by birth, of good family, he prepared for an ecclesiastical career at the cathedral school in Bamberg, where he received tuition by Anno of Steusslingen, the later Archbishop of Cologne. On 15 March 1058 Lambert entered the Benedictine abbey of Hersfeld as a monk. On September 16, he was also ordained as a priest in Aschaffenburg and therefore sometimes called Lampert of Aschaffenburg.

After his elevation to the priesthood, he made a pilgrimage to Jerusalem. Back in Hersfeld in October 1059, Lambert worked in the cloister library and taught at the monastery school. In 1071 he visited the Benedictine abbeys of Siegburg and Saalfeld to study the Cluniac Reforms, promoted by his mentor Archbishop Anno II of Cologne. However, Lambert adhered to traditional Benedictine rules and remained reserved towards monastic reforms.

Lambert was a convinced opponent of the German king Henry IV. In 1077, during the rising conflict with Pope Gregory VII, he moved from Hersfeld to the canon monastery of Hasungen at the instigation of Henry's enemy Archbishop Siegfried I of Mainz. He turned Hasungen into a Benedictine abbey, settled with monks descending from Hirsau. A variety of circumstantial evidence suggests that from 1081, Lambert even served as the first abbot.

He probably died shortly afterwards, no later than in 1085.

== Historical works ==
Lambert is most famous as the author of an extensive historical chronicle known as the Annales, first published in 1525 by Kaspar Currer in Tübingen. They were edited in the Monumenta Germaniae Historica, along with Lampert's other known works, by Oswald Holder-Egger (MGH Scriptores rerum Germanicarum in usu scholarum, volume 38) in 1894. Holder-Egger, in his edition of Lampert's work, also demonstrated that Lampert was the likely author of at least two other significant works: the Vita Lulli archiepiscopi Mogontiacensis, a hagiography of the founder of Hersfeld Abbey, Saint Lullus, Archbishop of Mainz (c. 710–786), and a shorter, polemic history of the Hersfeld monastery (Libellus de institutione Herveldensis ecclesiae), which survives only fragmentarily in excerpts made by later medieval German writers. Lambert's history of the Germans, De rebus gestis Germanorum was printed in the compilation of chronicles edited by Johann Pistorius (Frankfurt, 1613).

The Annals begin with a universal history from the creation of the world until about 1040. This portion of the work is drawn largely from other, earlier annalistic works, particularly those of Saint Bede, Isidore of Seville, and from German traditions like the Annals of Quedlinburg and Weissenburg. From about the date of 1042 onwards, however, the account is Lampert's own and he carries the history from there up to the year 1077, when the Swabian duke Rudolf of Rheinfelden was crowned anti-king by the dissident princes. Lambert's Annales are among the most important sources available for the reign of King Henry IV, the Investiture Controversy, and the Saxon revolt of 1073–1075. Among the significant events detailed in Lampert's history are the infamous Coup of Kaiserswerth in 1062, Henry's famous Walk to Canossa where he submitted (albeit temporarily) to Pope Gregory VII, and the 1075 Battle of Langensalza where Henry's forces defeated the Saxon and Thuringian rebels. Lambert ended his work with the election of anti-king Rudolf of Swabia, stating that his own account had reached an appropriate conclusion and that another writer would be able to pick up from where he left off in chronicling this new era for the German kingdom (Rudolf was mortally wounded in the Battle on the Elster against Henry's forces in 1080).

Lampert was well educated for his time and wrote in classical Latin drawing references and allusions to Roman authors, particularly Livy, Sallust, and the playwright Terence. Like many of the classical authors he admired, Lampert presented himself as an observer of elite society, critically examining the political conflicts and scandals of his day. His writing chronicled how power and pride could corrupt rulers and society, advance those lacking in merit and disadvantage those of good character.

Lampert's chronicle was translated into English by I.S. Robsinson in 2015 as The Annals of Lampert of Hersfeld.

== Reputation as a historian ==
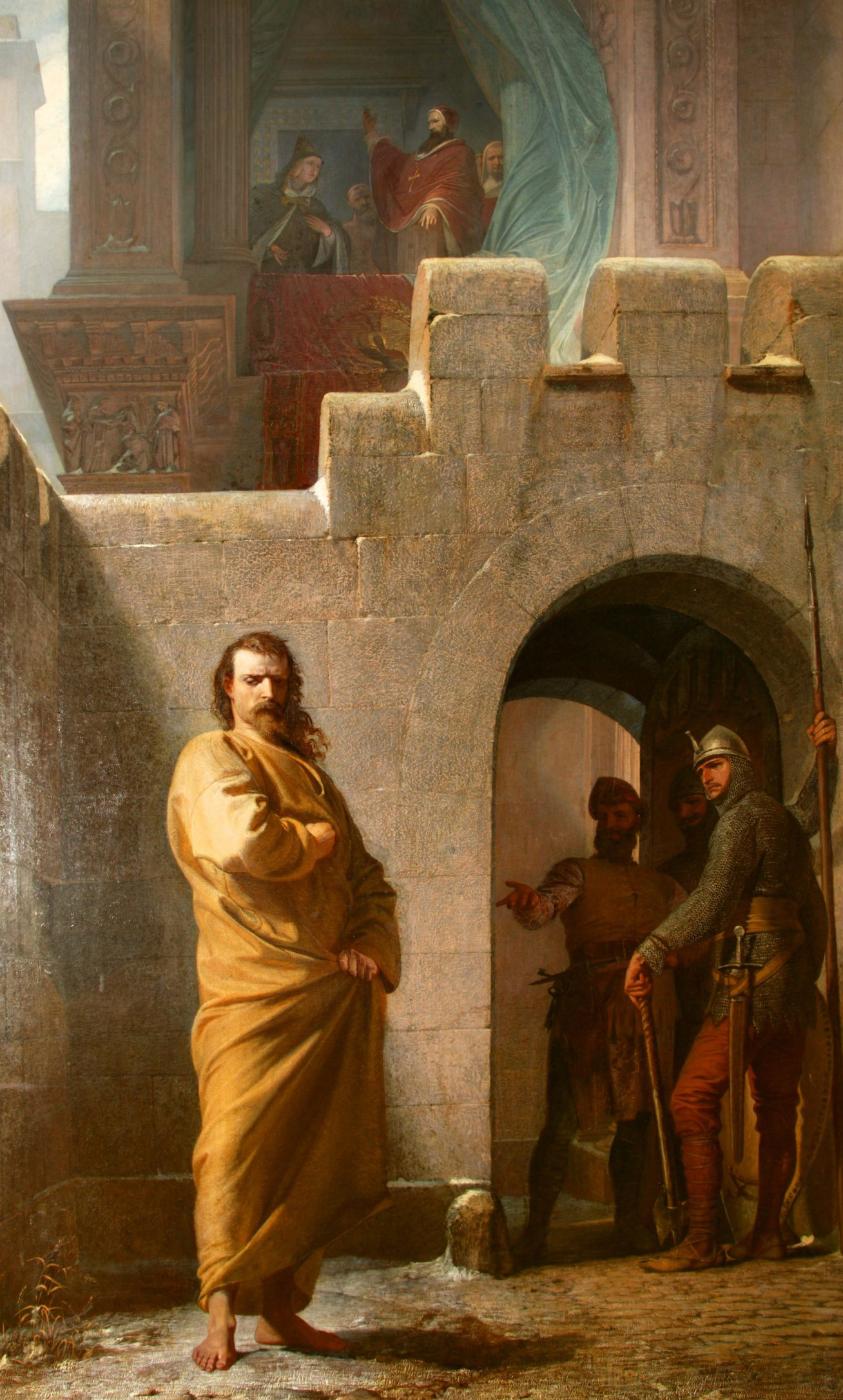
Henry at Canossa, 19th-century painting

Throughout, Lambert demonstrates his hostility to 'godless' King Henry IV and royal interests, which is not surprising given his sympathies for the independence of the regional aristocracy. He expresses a generally favorable opinion of Pope Gregory VII and the ecclesiastical reform movement, but also evinces skepticism towards some contemporary monastic reforms in Germany. He is also quite uncharitable towards figures like Archbishop Siegfried I of Mainz, who encroached on the traditional rights and prerogatives of Hersfeld and other monasteries.

Lambert's assessments, especially of Henry's Walk to Canossa, dominated the German historical image up to the times of the Kulturkampf in the nineteenth century. On the other hand, German historians trained in the positivistic methods of comparative source criticism taught that Lampert was a strongly biased, partisan writer who could not be trusted for an objective account of the reign of Henry IV. Oswald Holder-Egger himself called Lambert an outright fabulist in some instances. Scholars at this time held critical objectivity to be the highest value in a historical source and Lambert, along with many other medieval writers, failed to meet this standard. While they acknowledged Lambert provided important details for certain events and dates, his own view of history and opinions about some matters could not be accepted.

Today, however, historians try to approach medieval historiography on its own terms and in its own contexts, rather than impose modern standards of objectivity on medieval authors. Modern scholars recognize Lambert as an important voice representing the conservative views of the regional aristocracy and elite monasticism in a turbulent period in the kingdom's history.
