= Bruno the Saxon =

German chronicler and author

Bruno the Saxon (Latin: Bruno Saxonicus), also known as Bruno of Merseburg (German: Brun von Merseburg) or Bruno of Magdeburg, was a German chronicler of the eleventh century and author of the Historia de Bello Saxonico ('History of the Saxon War').

== Life ==
Little is known of his life. Bruno was probably from an aristocratic background. He was a Saxon monk belonging to the household of Archbishop Werner of Magdeburg, who was a vigorous opponent of Henry IV and one of the leaders of the Saxon uprising against the emperor. After the death of the archbishop in 1078 at the hands of peasants, Bruno attached himself to Werner of Wolkenburg, Prince-Bishop of Merseburg, to whom, in 1082, he dedicated the work, "De Bello Saxonico" by which he is chiefly known. As its name indicates, it is a record of the struggles of the Saxons with the Emperor Henry IV. The author begins with an account of the youth of Henry and the evil influence exerted over him by Archbishop Adalbert of Hamburg-Bremen after he had passed from the stern tutelage of Anno II, Archbishop of Cologne. He then traces the relations of the emperor with the Saxons and narrates at length the causes and events of the Saxon rebellions, ending with the election of Hermann of Luxemburg as king in 1081.

== Historia de Bello Saxonico ==
Bruno sought to justify the rebellion of the Saxons and the election of the first anti-king, Rudolf, and to show how by his oppressive government King Henry had forfeited any right to rule, both for himself and his dynasty. Bruno also devoted considerable attention to Henry’s dispute with Pope Gregory VII, ten of whose letters he reproduced in his history. But while supporting the pope against the king, he made clear, both in his own words and through letters which he copied, that the German rebels were deeply disappointed by the Gregory’s absolution of Henry at Canossa in December 1076, and his attempt to remain neutral after the more intransigent rebels had elected a rival king at Forchheim in March 1077. Bruno was at pains to stress that this election was conducted with the full knowledge and involvement of a papal legate, and indeed followed the standards of probity laid down by canon law. Hence there could be no doubt about its validity. Bruno described the dissatisfaction of the Saxons to the actions of Gregory VII. The German rebels reproached Gregory VII for not supporting the anti-king Rudolf. The letters to which they refer, which Bruno reproduced in full, were those sent by Gregory in the summer of 1077 to his legates, and to the clergy and people of Germany, setting out the terms by which a judgement might be made between the respective claims of Henry and Rudolf to be the rightful king.

== Criticism ==
There has been a difference of opinion regarding the historical value of Bruno's work. It was written during the contentions between Henry and Pope Gregory VII, and the author has been classed with those partisans who, either through ignorance or malice, endeavoured to lower Henry in the esteem of his subjects. Bruno indeed supported the pope's cause, and his Saxon sympathies manifest themselves at times in his writings, but of his sincerity and his expressed purpose to narrate the truth there can be no doubt. He made the most of his sources of information and, in spite of occasional omissions, gives a vivid picture of the times from the point of view of an interested contemporary. The letters of Saxon bishops and other original documents which he includes in his history give added value to the work.^{1}

== Editions ==
- Bruno of Merseburg, The Saxon War, trans. Bernard S. Bachrach and David S. Barchrach. Catholic University of America Press, 2022.
