= List of protected heritage sites in Hasselt =

The list of immovable heritage sites in Hasselt with an overview of the immovable heritage sites in the Flemish town Hasselt contains over 500 objects.

These lists are part of Belgium's national heritage:

- List of immovable heritage sites in Hasselt (part 1) (numbers 21834–21968)
- List of immovable heritage sites in Hasselt (part 2) (numbers 21969–22099)
- List of immovable heritage sites in Hasselt (part 3) (numbers 22100–22303)
- List of immovable heritage sites in Hasselt (part 4) (numbers 22306–22520, and others up to number 212718)

== See also ==
- List of onroerend erfgoed in Limburg (Belgium)
- Hasselt
