= Berthold IV =

Berthold IV may refer to:

- Berthold IV, Duke of Zähringen (1125–1186)
- Berthold IV, Duke of Merania (died 1204)
