= Adalbert I =

Adalbert I may refer to:

- Adalbert I, Margrave of Tuscany (c.820–886), guardian of Corsica
- Adalbert I of Ivrea, fl. c. 900
- Adalbert I, Archbishop of Magdeburg (c. 910–981), Apostle of the Slavs
- Adalbert I, Count of Vermandois (915–987)
- Adalbert I von Saarbrücken (died 1137), Archbishop of Mainz
- Adalbert I, Duke of Teck (c. 1135 – c. 1195), German nobleman
