= House of Zähringen =

Dynasty of Swabian nobility

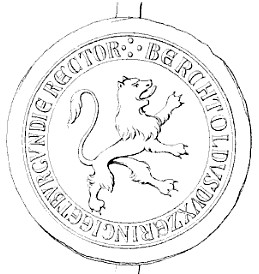
- Seal of Berthold IV, featuring a lion rampant
- Parent family: Alaholfings
- Country: Duchy of Carinthia; March of Verona; Margraviate of Baden; Grand Duchy of Baden
- Founded: 11th century
- Founder: Berthold I of Zähringen
- Final ruler: Berthold V as Duke of Zähringen; Frederick II as Grand Duke of Baden
- Dissolution: 1218 (ducal branch of Zähringen)
- Branches: Baden (extant); Teck (extinct in 1439)

The House of Zähringen (German: Zähringer, pronounced [ˈtsɛːʁɪŋɐ]) was a dynasty of Swabian nobility. The family's name derived from Zähringen Castle near Freiburg im Breisgau. The Zähringer in the 12th century used the title of Duke of Zähringen, in compensation for having conceded the title of Duke of Swabia to the Staufer in 1098. The Zähringer were granted the special title of Rector of Burgundy in 1127, and they continued to use both titles until the extinction of the ducal line in 1218.

The territories and fiefs held by the Zähringer were known as the Duchy of Zähringen (German: Herzogtum Zähringen), but it was not seen as a duchy in equal standing with the old stem duchies. The Zähringer attempted to expand their territories in Swabia and Burgundy into a fully recognized duchy, but their expansion was halted in the 1130s due to their feud with the Welfs. Pursuing their territorial ambitions, the Zähringer founded numerous cities and monasteries on either side of the Black Forest, as well as in the western Swiss Plateau. After the extinction of the ducal line in 1218, parts of the family's territories reverted to the crown (attained imperial immediacy), while other parts were divided between the houses of Kyburg, Urach and Fürstenberg.

== History ==
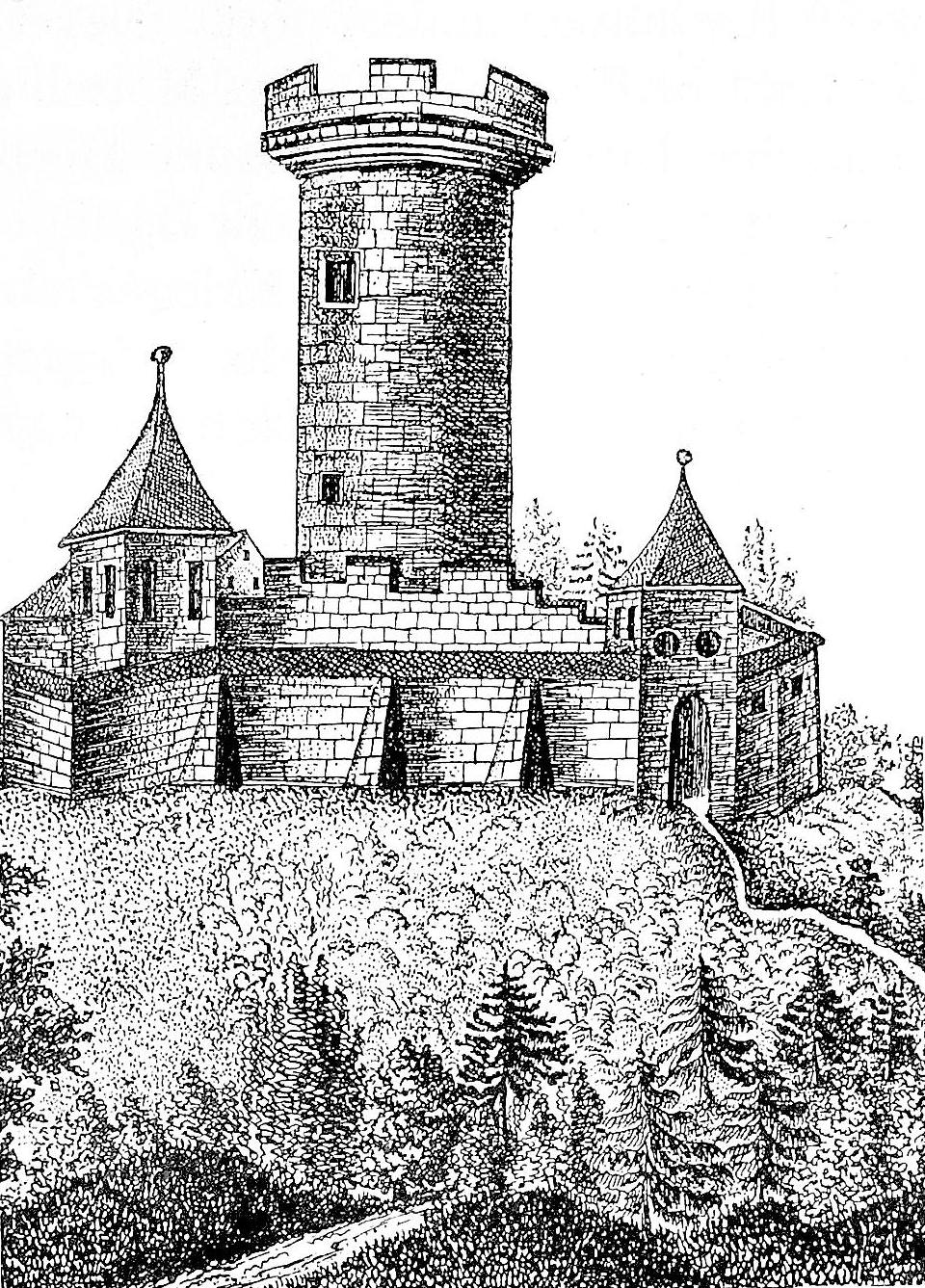
Zähringen Castle, c. 1500.

The earliest-known ancestor (progenitor) of the family was one Berthold, Count in the Breisgau (d. 982), who was first mentioned in 962. In view of his name, he may have been related to the Alemannic Alaholfing dynasty.

Count Berthold's great-grandson, who became known as Berthold II, Duke of Carinthia – posthumously referred to as Berthold I of Zähringen (c. 1000–1078) – held several lordships (Herrschaften) in the Breisgau, in Thurgau, Ortenau and Baar. By his mother, he was related to the rising Hohenstaufen family. Emperor Henry III had promised his vassal Berthold the Duchy of Swabia, but this was not fulfilled, as upon Henry's death, his widow Agnes of Poitou appointed Count Rudolf of Rheinfelden to the position of Duke of Swabia in 1057. In compensation, Berthold was made Duke of Carinthia and Margrave of Verona in 1061. However, this dignity was only a titular one, and Berthold subsequently lost it when, in the course of the Investiture Controversy, he joined the rising of his former rival Rudolf of Rheinfelden against German king Henry IV in 1073.

Berthold's son Berthold II (c. 1050–1111), who like his father fought against Henry IV, inherited a lot of the lands of Rudolf's son Count Berthold of Rheinfelden in 1090 (though not his comital title, which stayed with the family von Wetter-Rheinfelden). Berthold II is so named both as Duke of Swabia (following Berthold of Rheinfelden, the first duke of Swabia of this name) and as head of the House of Zähringen (following his father, who is counted as Berthold I of Zähringen in spite of not historically having used the name Zähringen). Berthold II did use the name Zähringen, although he moved his main residence from Zähringen Castle to the newly built Freiburg Castle in 1091.

In 1092, Berthold II was elected Duke of Swabia against Frederick I of Hohenstaufen. In 1098, he reconciled with Frederick, renounced all claims to Swabia and instead concentrated on his possessions in the Breisgau region, assuming the title of Duke of Zähringen. He was succeeded in turn by his sons Berthold III (d. 1122) and Conrad (d. 1152).

In 1127, upon the assassination of his nephew Count William III, Conrad claimed the inheritance of the County of Burgundy against Count Renaud III of Mâcon. Renaud prevailed, although he had to cede large parts of the eastern Transjuranian lands to Conrad, who thereupon was appointed by Emperor Lothair III as a 'rector' of the Imperial Kingdom of Burgundy-Arles. This office was confirmed in 1152 and held by the Zähringer dukes until 1218. As a result, they are sometimes referred to as 'Dukes of Burgundy', although the existing Duchy of Burgundy was not an Imperial fief but a French one. Duke Berthold IV (d. 1186), who followed his father Conrad and founded the Swiss city of Fryburg (today's Fribourg-Freiburg) in 1157, spent much of his time in Italy in the train of Emperor Frederick I Barbarossa.

His son and successor, Berthold V, showed his prowess by reducing the Burgundian nobles to order. This latter duke was the founder of the city of Bern in 1191, and when he died in February 1218, the ducal line of the Zähringer became extinct. Among other titles, the Zähringen family acted as Reichsvogt of the Zürichgau area.

After the extinction of the ducal line in 1218, much of its extensive territory in the Breisgau and modern-day Switzerland returned to the crown, except for the allodial titles, which were divided between the counts of Urach (who subsequently called themselves the counts of Freiburg) and the counts of Kyburg, both descended from the sisters of Berthold V. Less than fifty years later, the Kyburgs died out, and large portions of their domains were inherited by the House of Habsburg. Bern achieved the status of a free imperial city, whereas other cities (such as Fribourg-Freiburg) only obtained the same status later in history.

== Possessions and territories ==
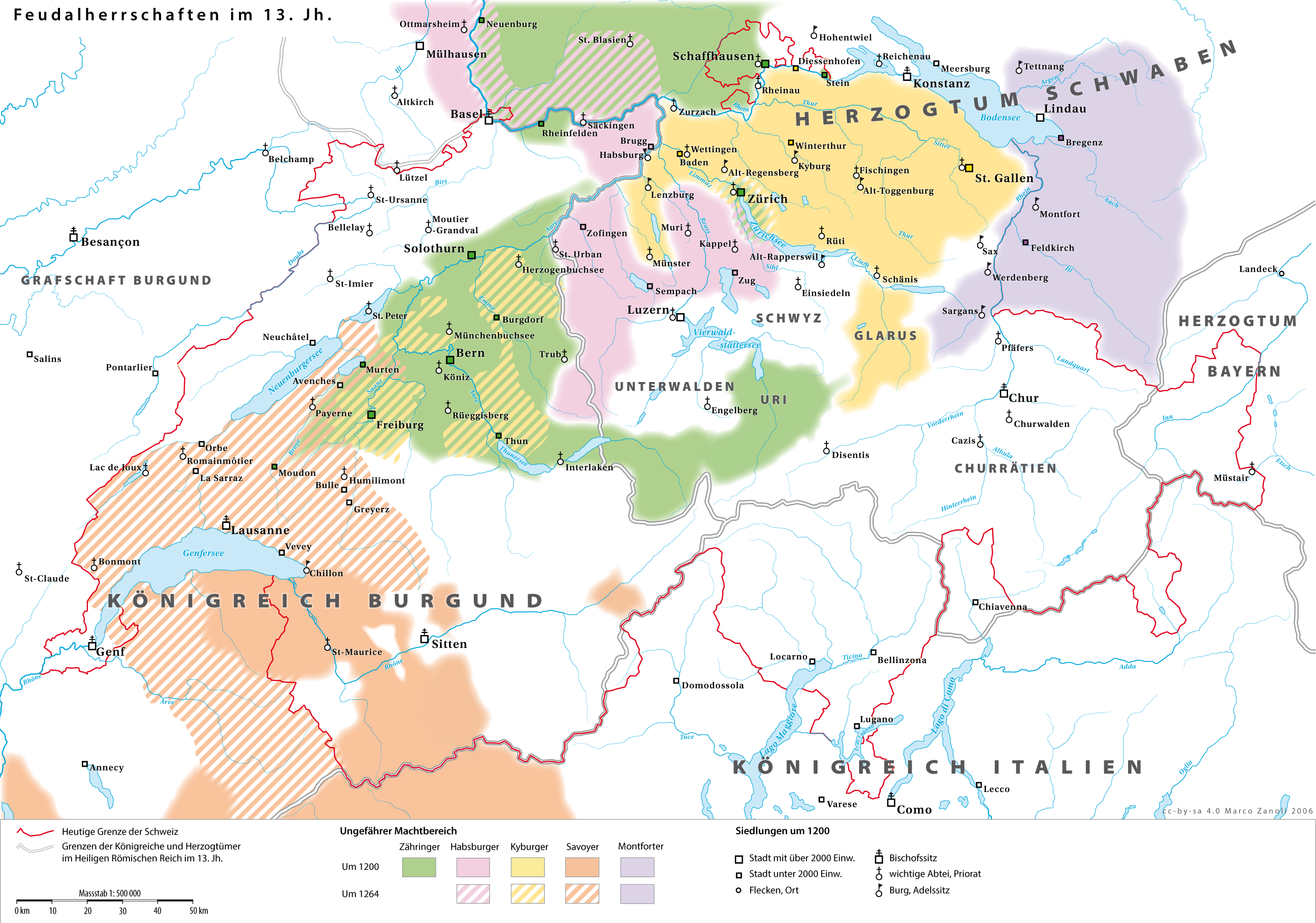
Territories of the dominant noble houses in Swabia and Upper Burgundy around 1200, with Zähringer possessions shown in green.

Berthold I (ancestor of both the House of Zähringen and the House of Baden) held the comital titles of Breisgau and Thurgau, as well as being reeve in Stein am Rhein (owned by the bishop of Bamberg). The county of Thurgau was lost around 1077.

In 1098, Berthold II, founder of the House of Zähringen proper, received Zähringen Castle and the jurisdiction over Zürich (alongside the Counts of Lenzburg until 1173). Ownership of the county of Rheinfelden and of Burgdorf also dates to c. 1198.

The 'rectorate' of the county of Burgundy was granted in 1127 (inheritance of Otto-William, Count of Burgundy). Ownership of Burgundy was contested, and Zähringer de facto rule was limited to the parts of Upper Burgundy east of the Jura and north of Lake Geneva. The territories south of Lake Geneva were conceded to Savoy and Provence in 1156. In compensation, Berthold IV received the investiture right for the bishops of Geneva, Sion and Lausanne, de facto realised only in the case of Lausanne.

The extinction of the counts of Lenzburg in 1173 strengthened the Zähringer position south of the Rhine, but their territorial expansion was halted following their support of the Welfs in the unsuccessful feud against Conrad III of Germany during 1138–1152. This frustrated their ambitions to carve out a contiguous territorial duchy wedged between Swabia and Burgundy, in spite of late attempts on the part of Berthold V to increase his territorial sway (who as late as 1210 aimed at receiving the jurisdiction over St. Gallen).

Instead of territorial expansion, the dukes of Zähringen from the 1150s focused on attaining more immediate feudal control over the territories they already had. This included their policy of expanding settlements into fortified towns or cities and the construction of new castles, mostly in their territories north of the Rhine. Their encroachment on the rights of the comital nobility south of the Rhine seems to have been resisted, mostly passively, but in the case of the lords of Glâne and Thun in an open revolt in 1191.

The fragmentation of the Zähringer possessions after 1218 was an important factor in the communal movements of the late medieval period in the region, including the imperial immediacy of Bern and Zürich, and the growth of the Old Swiss Confederacy in the early 14th century.

=== Cities ===
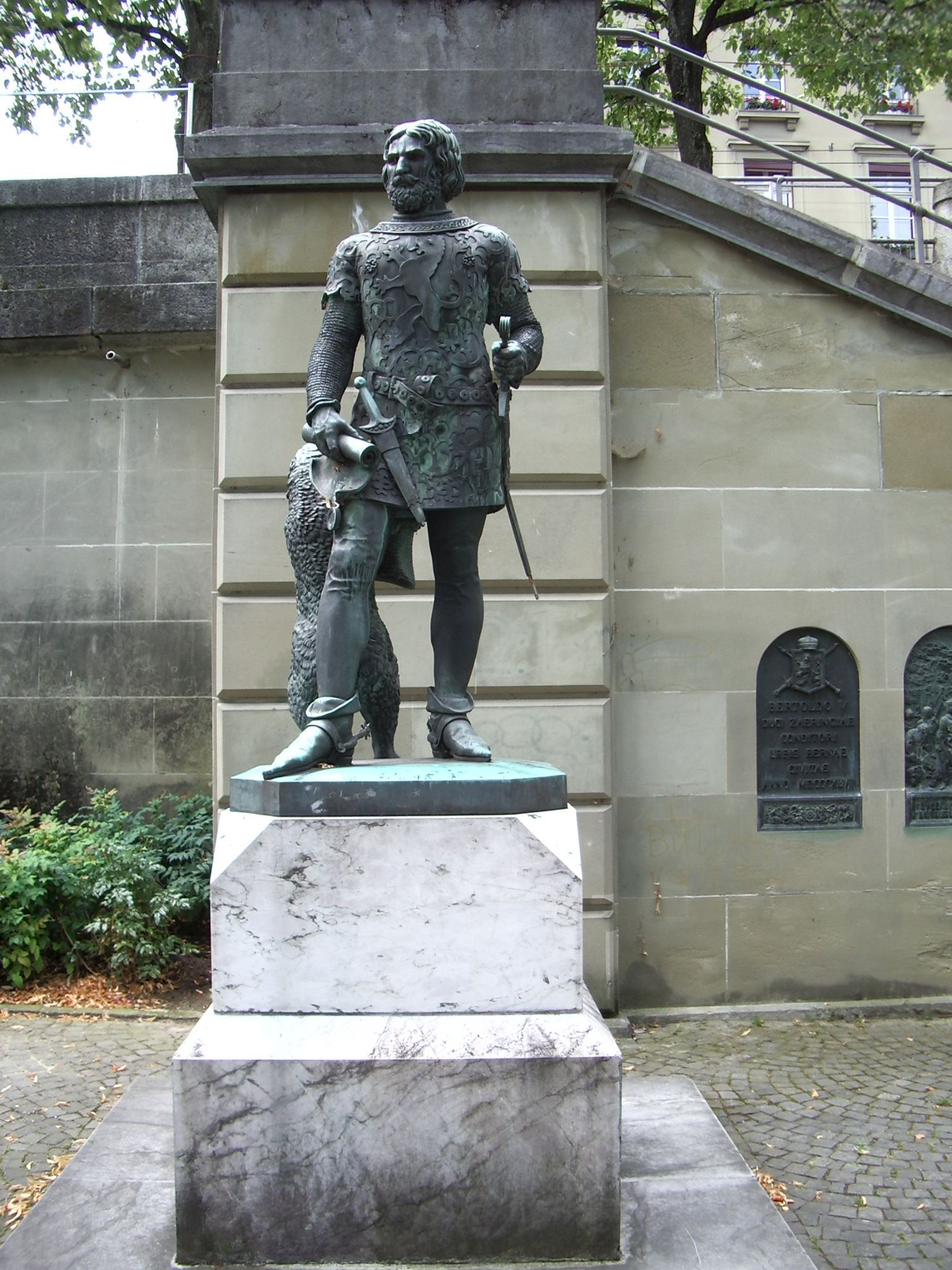
Berthold V on the Zähringer monument in Bern, Switzerland.

Among the cities founded or expanded by the Zähringer dukes (German: Zähringerstädte) are:

- in Swabia, west of the Black Forest (Baden): Freiburg im Breisgau (1120), Offenburg (before 1148), Neuenburg am Rhein (1175);
- in Swabia, east of the Black Forest (Württemberg): Sankt Peter (1093), Villingen (1119), Bräunlingen (c. 1200), Weilheim an der Teck (Limburg castle c. 1060);
- in Burgundy (western Swiss plateau):
  - on the Rhine: Rheinfelden (c. 1150);
  - Aare basin: Fribourg (Freiburg im Üechtland, 1157) Bern (1191), Burgdorf (castle before 1175), Murten (c. 1180), Thun (c. 1190).

Other towns owned by or under the jurisdiction (Reichsvogtei) of the Zähringer include: Solothurn (acquired 1127), Zürich (acquired 1173), Schaffhausen (acquired 1198) and Stein am Rhein.

The city of Morges on Lake Geneva is not a Zähringer foundation (having been founded in 1286 by Louis I of Vaud) but shared the characteristic layout of the Zähringer cities.

== Genealogy ==
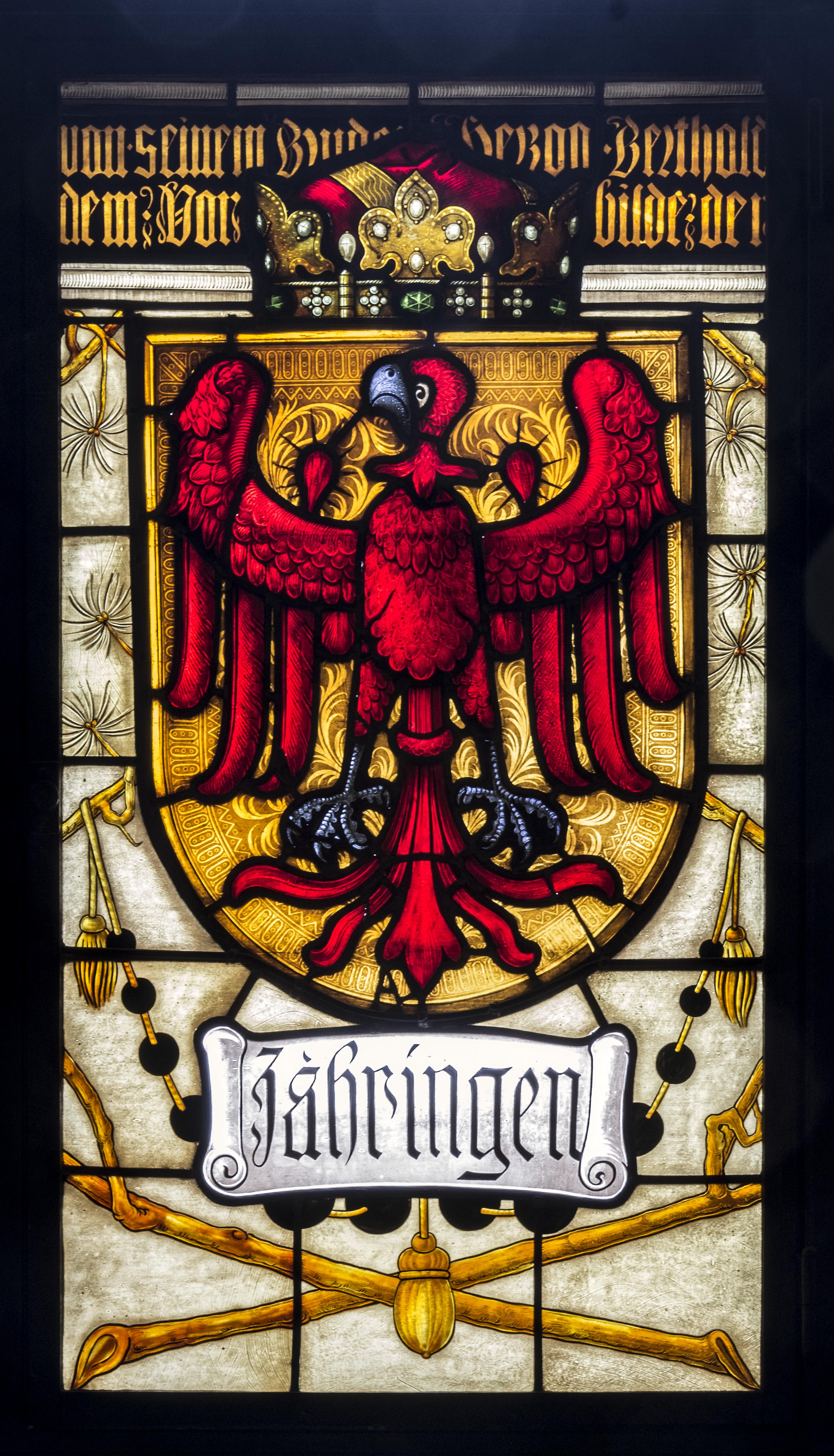
Zähringen attributed arms in a stained glass window by Hans Reichle (c. 1570–1642) in Freiburg im Breisgau Town Hall. There are two traditions of attributed arms, either or an eagle displayed gules (shown here) or gules a lion rampant or, based on the respective coats of arms used in the later medieval period by the counts of Freiburg who claimed the Zähringer inheritance (ancestors of the House of Fürstenberg).

=== House of Zähringen ===
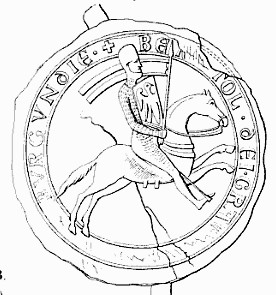
Equestrian seal of Berthold V, dated 1187.

Berthold II, Duke of Carinthia, Margrave of Verona (c. 1000–1078, r. 1061–1077), is also known as "Berthold I of Zähringen". Therefore, the succession of dukes of Zähringen begins with his son as Berthold II:

Dukes of Zähringen:

- Berthold II (c. 1050–1111), Duke of Swabia from 1092 to 1098 (against Frederick I of Hohenstaufen), then Duke of Zähringen from about 1100. The numeral II carried by Berthold refers to both the House of Zähringen (succeeding his father Berthold I) and the Duchy of Swabia (succeeding Berthold I, Duke of Swabia of the House of Rheinfelden).
- Berthold III (c. 1085–1122), son, Duke of Zähringen from 1111
- Conrad I (c. 1090–1152), brother, Duke of Zähringen from 1122, rector of Burgundy from 1127
- Berthold IV (c. 1125–1186), son, Duke of Zähringen from 1152, rector of Burgundy
- Berthold V (1160–1218), son, Duke of Zähringen from 1186, rector of Burgundy

Other notable Zähringer:

- Gebhard of Zähringen (d. 1110), son of Berthold I, became Bishop of Constance
- Clementia of Zähringen (d. 1175), daughter of Conrad I, married Henry the Lion, Duke of Saxony in 1147
- Rudolf of Zähringen (d. 1191), son of Conrad I, became Archbishop of Mainz and Bishop of Liège

=== House of Baden ===
The Veronese margravial title was used by Herman I of Baden, the eldest son of Berthold I of Zähringen. Herman's son, Herman II, was the first to use the title of Margrave of Baden in 1112.

Now more commonly known as the House of Baden, Herman's descendants ruled successively as margraves until the Final Recess of 1803, as electors of the Electorate of Baden until 1806, then as Grand Dukes of Baden until the end of the German monarchy in 1918. For the Heads of the House of Baden until 1918, see the list of monarchs of Baden.

Heads of the House of Baden since 1918

- Leopold, Grand Duke of Baden
  - Frederick I, Grand Duke of Baden
    - Frederick II, Grand Duke 1907–1928 (1857–1928)
  - Prince William of Baden
    - Maximilian, Prince and Margrave, 1928–1929 (1867–1929)
      - Berthold, 1929–1963 (1906–1963)
        - Maximilian, 1963–2022 (1933–2022)
          - Bernhard, 2022–present (born 1970)
            - (1) Leopold (born 2002)
            - (2) Friedrich (born 2004)
            - (3) Karl-Wilhelm (born 2006)
          - (4) Leopold (born 1971)
          - (5) Michael (born 1976)
        - (6) Ludwig (born 1937)
          - (7) Berthold (born 1976)
            - (8) Max (born 2023)

=== Dukes of Teck ===
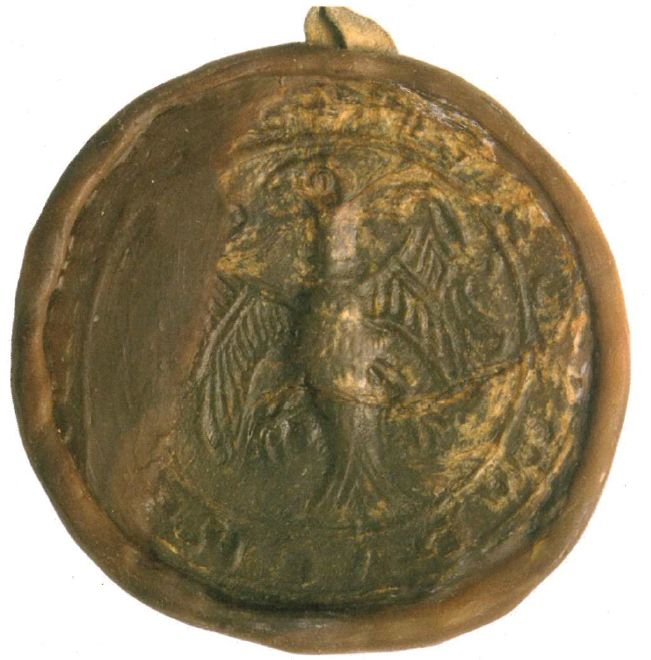
Seal of Adalbert I, Duke of Teck (c. 1190).

Adalbert I (d. 1196) was a son of Duke Conrad I of Zähringen. Upon the death of his brother Berthold IV in 1186, he inherited the family estates around Teck Castle and, from 1187, adopted the title of Duke of Teck. His descendant Conrad II of Teck (1235–1292) allegedly was designated King of the Romans shortly before his assassination. The line became extinct in 1439 with the death of Louis of Teck, Patriarch of Aquileia.

In 1871, a ducal title with the same name was granted by King Charles I of Württemberg to Prince Francis of Teck (1837–1900), a morganatic son of Duke Alexander of Württemberg. Francis' daughter Mary of Teck (1867–1953), as the wife of King George V, became Queen of the United Kingdom and the British Dominions, and Empress of India.

Francis's surviving children ceased using their German titles during World War I and (aside from Queen Mary) took the name Cambridge, with his eldest son (Adolphus) being made Marquess of Cambridge and his youngest son (Alexander) being made Earl of Athlone. This branch of the family died out in the male line in 1981 and in its entirety in 1994 with the death of Francis's granddaughter, Lady Mary Abel Smith.

== See also ==
- Bertoldsbrunnen
- Order of the Zähringer Lion
- Zähringerbrunnen
