= Arnold of Selenhofen =

- Archbishop of Mainz
- Church: Catholic Church
- Diocese: Electorate of Mainz
- In office: 1153–1160

Personal details
- Born: c. 1095/1100
- Died: 24 June 1160

Arnold of Selenhofen (c. 1095/1100 – 24 June 1160) was the archbishop of Mainz from 1153 to his assassination in the Benedictine abbey St. Jakob, where he took shelter from the raging crowd.

He was born to a wealthy Mainz family. He studied at the University of Paris and became the treasurer of the archdiocese of Mainz, then provost of the cathedral. Conrad III made him archchancellor of Germany in 1151 and Frederick Barbarossa made him archbishop in 1153.

His administration of justice was unforgiving. While he was away in Italy working for the recognition of the Antipope Victor IV in 1159, the leading citizens rebelled. When he returned, he was murdered in front of the monastery of St. Jakob. He was buried in the church of St. Maria ad gradus (St. Mary of the Steps).

== Literature ==
- Johann Friedrich Böhmer: Martyrium Arnoldi Archiepiscopi Moguntini. Stuttgart 1853. (Fontes Rerum Germanicarum 3), pp. 173–217
- Burkhardt, Stefan, Mit Stab und Schwert. Bilder, Träger und Funktionen erzbischöflicher Herrschaft zur Zeit Kaiser Friedrich Barbarossas. Die Erzbistümer Köln und Mainz im Vergleich (Mittelalter-Forschungen 22), Ostfildern 2008.
- Burkhardt, Stefan, Vita Arnoldi archiepiscopi Moguntinensis, Schnell + Steiner, 2014, ISBN 978-3-7954-2940-9

Catholic Church titles
Preceded by Henry I	Archbishop of Mainz; 1153–1160	Succeeded by Rudolf
Preceded by Henry I	Archbishop of Mainz; 1153–1160	Succeeded by Christian I
