= Herkenrode beer =

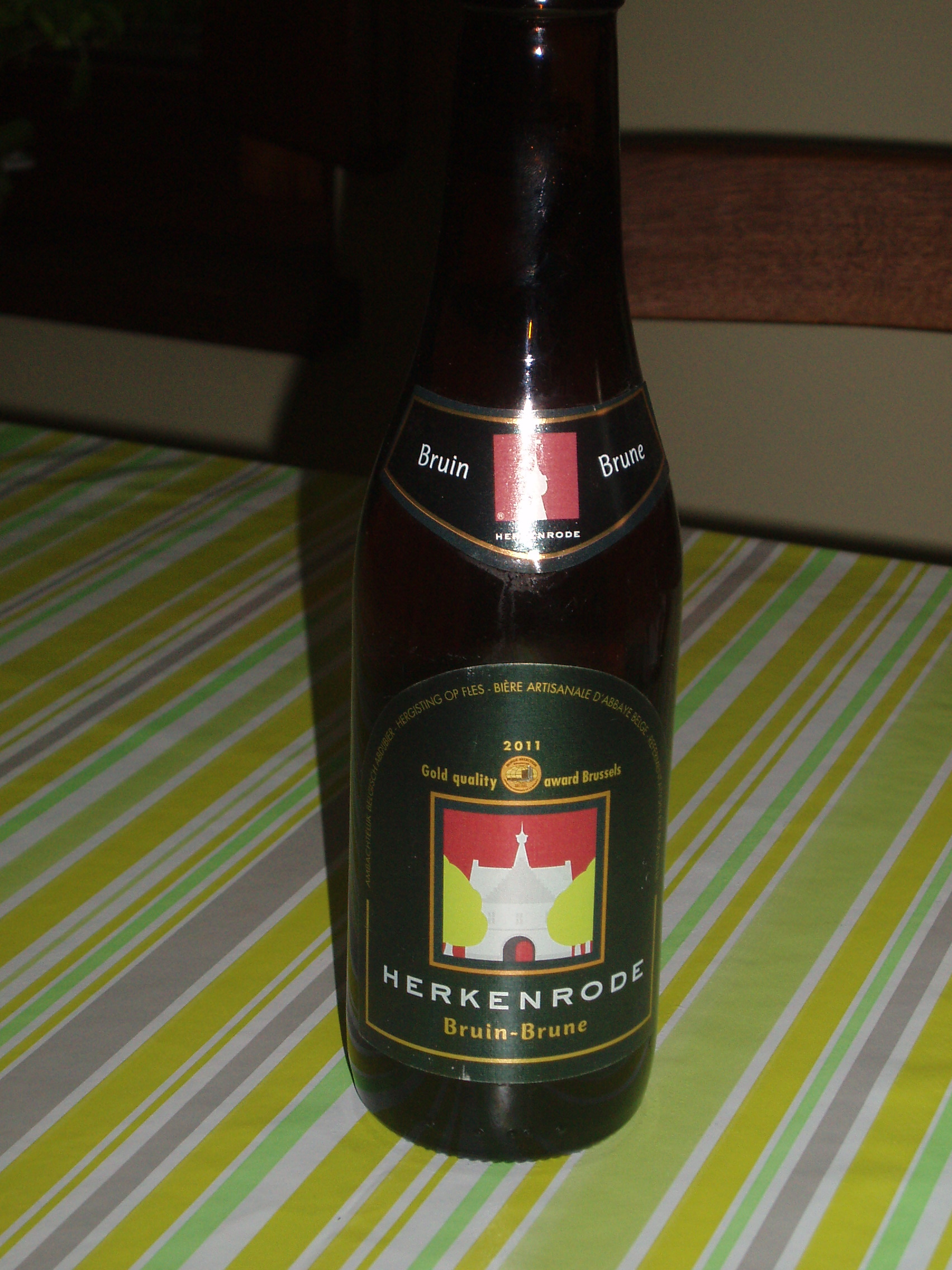
Bottle of Herkenrode Bruin

Herkenrode is a Belgian abbey beer brewed by the Cornelissen Brewery (formerly the Brouwerij Sint-Jozef) at Opitter in Bree, Limburg, named after the former Herkenrode Abbey in Hasselt.

== Background ==
The Herkenrode beers were launched in 2009. The name refers to Herkenrode Abbey, a former Cistercian nunnery (founded in 1192) at Kuringen, part of Hasselt, where beer was brewed until the abbey's suppression in the 1790s as a result of the French Revolution.

The brief, obtained from Wim Van Lishout, president of Herkenrode vzw, the company that runs the former abbey site, was to brew a beer with the strength of the counts of Loon, the elegance of the abbesses of Herkenrode and the aroma of the Herkenrode herb garden.

The Federation of Belgian Brewers accepted Herkenrode being named as an Erkend Belgisch Abdijbier, with the accompanying logo, in June 2009. Herkenrode was the 23rd beer to be so named, and the second in Limburg.

== Beers ==
There were originally two beers: Herkenrode Tripel and Herkenrode Bruin, both with an alcohol percentage of 7%. Both were on the market in December 2009. From 2017 there have been three varieties:

- Herkenrode Cister Blond (6.5% vol.)
- Herkenrode Vesper Tripel (9% vol.)
- Herkenrode Noctis Bruin

== Distinctions ==
Herkenrode Noctis Bruin received two gold medals in the Monde Selection, was declared in 2016 the best Belgian dark beer in the World Beer Awards and in 2017 received a bronze medal at the Australian International Beer Awards.

== Bibliography ==
- Deweer, H., 2011: Alle Belgische bieren. ISBN 9789058563774
- Calderon, A., 2009: Bieren en Brouwerijen van België. ISBN 9789077135181
