= List of immovable heritage sites in Hasselt (part 3) =

This table shows an overview of the immovable heritage sites in the Flemish town Hasselt. This list is part of Belgium's national heritage.

Object	Status^{?}	Year/architect	Town/section	Address	Coordinates	Number^{?}	Image
House "The Bleyden Hoeck" ^{(nl)}			Hasselt	Vismarkt 5	50.92953°N 5.33855°E	22100 Info	
Neoclassical mansion ^{(nl)} ^{(fr)}			Hasselt	Vismarkt 9	50.92944°N 5.33872°E	22102 Info	
Police and Fire Station (former) ^{(nl)} ^{(fr)}			Hasselt	Minderbroedersstraat 12	50.93148°N 5.33717°E	22104 Info	
Police and Fire Station (former) ^{(nl)} ^{(fr)}			Hasselt	Walputstraat 7	50.93148°N 5.33717°E	22104 Info	
House "The Zonneke", former city farm ^{(nl)} ^{(fr)}	Yes		Hasselt	Walputstraat 21	50.93161°N 5.33681°E	22105 Info	
House ^{(nl)} ^{(fr)}			Hasselt	Walputstraat 23	50.93161°N 5.33659°E	22106 Info	
House ^{(nl)} ^{(fr)}			Hasselt	Walputstraat 25	50.93161°N 5.33659°E	22106 Info	
House ^{(nl)} ^{(fr)}			Hasselt	Walputstraat 27	50.93161°N 5.33659°E	22106 Info	
Mansion "The Wijniox" or "The Wijnton" ^{(nl)} ^{(fr)}			Hasselt	Walputstraat 29	50.93168°N 5.33640°E	22107 Info	
House "God the Father" ^{(nl)} ^{(fr)}			Hasselt	Walputstraat 31	50.93170°N 5.33632°E	22108 Info	
Station of the White Nuns, now boarding of the Rijksnormaal school ^{(nl)} ^{(fr)}			Hasselt	Witte Nonnenstraat 20	50.93288°N 5.34076°E	22110 Info	
Distillery Theunissen ^{(nl)} ^{(fr)}	Yes		Hasselt	Witte Nonnenstraat 19	50.93270°N 5.34042°E	22111 Info	More images
Worker's house from 1891-1893 ^{(nl)} ^{(fr)}			Hasselt	Witte Nonnenstraat 11	50.93295°N 5.34019°E	22112 Info	
Worker's house from 1891-1893 ^{(nl)} ^{(fr)}			Hasselt	Witte Nonnenstraat 13	50.93295°N 5.34019°E	22112 Info	
Worker's house from 1891-1893 ^{(nl)} ^{(fr)}			Hasselt	Witte Nonnenstraat 15	50.93295°N 5.34019°E	22112 Info	
Worker's house from 1891-1893 ^{(nl)} ^{(fr)}			Hasselt	Witte Nonnenstraat 17	50.93295°N 5.34019°E	22112 Info	
Provincial Library, the former convent ^{(nl)} ^{(fr)}	Yes		Hasselt	Zuivelmarkt	50.93241°N 5.34147°E	22113 Info	More images
House "De Bloempot", also "In den Glazen Hoek" ^{(nl)}			Hasselt	Zuivelmarkt 1	50.93038°N 5.33938°E	22114 Info	
House "The Boerinneke" ^{(nl)} ^{(fr)}			Hasselt	Zuivelmarkt 3	50.93045°N 5.33943°E	22115 Info	
Flat, wide house ^{(nl)} ^{(fr)}			Hasselt	Zuivelmarkt 16	50.93096°N 5.33957°E	22116 Info	
Deanery, neoclassical mansion tinted ^{(nl)} ^{(fr)}	Yes		Hasselt	Zuivelmarkt 17	50.93084°N 5.34009°E	22117 Info	
House in classical style ^{(nl)} ^{(fr)}	Yes		Hasselt	Zuivelmarkt 18	50.93110°N 5.33967°E	22118 Info	
Flat, wide house ^{(nl)} ^{(fr)}			Hasselt	Zuivelmarkt 24	50.93119°N 5.34000°E	22119 Info	
The brandy Jeneverdistillery boiler (former) ^{(nl)} ^{(fr)}			Hasselt	Zuivelmarkt 25	50.93116°N 5.34056°E	22120 Info	
House "The Lemken", "Lamken", "Lammeken" ^{(nl)} ^{(fr)}			Hasselt	Zuivelmarkt 29	50.93141°N 5.34038°E	22121 Info	
Flat, wide house ^{(nl)} ^{(fr)}			Hasselt	Zuivelmarkt 64	50.93203°N 5.33967°E	22123 Info	
Parish of Our Lady of Visitation ^{(nl)} ^{(fr)}	Yes		Hasselt	Kiezelstraat	50.93714°N 5.38432°E	22126 Info	
Spanish house semi-closed farm ^{(nl)} ^{(fr)}	Yes		Hasselt	Kiezelstraat 70	50.93376°N 5.37923°E	22127 Info	
Spanish house semi-closed farm ^{(nl)} ^{(fr)}	Yes		Hasselt	Kiezelstraat 72	50.93376°N 5.37923°E	22127 Info	
Neoclassical parsonage ^{(nl)} ^{(fr)}			Hasselt	Kiezelstraat 132	50.93738°N 5.38451°E	22128 Info	
elongated farm ^{(nl)} ^{(fr)}			Hasselt	Nieuwe steenweg 45	50.92763°N 5.36898°E	22130 Info	
Our Lady Chapel of 1924 ^{(nl)} ^{(fr)}			Hasselt	Sasstraat	50.93977°N 5.35947°E	22131 Info	
elongated farm ^{(nl)} ^{(fr)}			Hasselt	Vissenbroekstraat 15	50.93718°N 5.37275°E	22132 Info	
Farm ^{(nl)} ^{(fr)}			Hasselt	Vissenbroekstraat 10	50.93614°N 5.37512°E	22133 Info	
elongated farm ^{(nl)} ^{(fr)}			Hasselt	Borggravevijversstraat 28	50.94630°N 5.37828°E	22135 Info	
elongated farm ^{(nl)} ^{(fr)}			Hasselt	Heksenbergstraat 7	50.94914°N 5.36219°E	22139 Info	
elongated farm ^{(nl)} ^{(fr)}			Hasselt	Hommelvennestraat 5	50.95211°N 5.39133°E	22140 Info	
Parish Church Saint-Lambert ^{(nl)} ^{(fr)}			Hasselt	Kempische steenweg	50.96319°N 5.35451°E	22141 Info	
Castle Kiewiet ^{(nl)} ^{(fr)}			Hasselt	Kiewitdreef 5	50.96022°N 5.37567°E	22142 Info	
Castle Kiewiet ^{(nl)} ^{(fr)}			Hasselt	Kiewitdreef 7	50.96067°N 5.37727°E	22142 Info	
Farmhouse with separate components ^{(nl)} ^{(fr)}	Yes		Hasselt	Nieuwe-Heidestraat 24	50.95388°N 5.37543°E	22144 Info	
elongated farm ^{(nl)} ^{(fr)}			Hasselt	Zonhovenstraat 54	50.97582°N 5.38590°E	22146 Info	
House, former elongated farm ^{(nl)} ^{(fr)}			Hasselt	Zonhovenstraat 72	50.97673°N 5.38744°E	22148 Info	
Closed farm ^{(nl)} ^{(fr)}			Hasselt	Trekschurenstraat 103	50.90761°N 5.33581°E	22149 Info	
Castle Henegauw ^{(nl)} ^{(fr)}			Hasselt	Luikersteenweg 427	50.89712°N 5.35434°E	22150 Info	
Castle Henegauw ^{(nl)} ^{(fr)}			Hasselt	Kloosterlaan 22A	50.89712°N 5.35434°E	22150 Info	
Chapel ^{(nl)} ^{(fr)}			Hasselt	Kroonwinningstraat	50.91743°N 5.35777°E	22152 Info	
Parish Church St. Jozef ^{(nl)} ^{(fr)}			Hasselt	Luikersteenweg	50.90465°N 5.35776°E	22155 Info	
"De Witte Winning" farm ^{(nl)}		GESLOOPT, nu benzinestation	Hasselt	Luikersteenweg 255	50.91174°N 5.35189°E	22156 Info	
elongated farm ^{(nl)} ^{(fr)}			Hasselt	Luikersteenweg 685	50.88580°N 5.35261°E	22158 Info	
elongated farm ^{(nl)} ^{(fr)}			Hasselt	Melbeekstraat 73	50.89701°N 5.36264°E	22163 Info	
Semi-closed farm ^{(nl)} ^{(fr)}	Yes		Hasselt	Melbeekstraat 79	50.89652°N 5.36360°E	22164 Info	
"Mombeekwinning" closed farm ^{(nl)} ^{(fr)}			Hasselt	Mombeekdreef 96	50.88807°N 5.36622°E	22168 Info	
Castle Mombeek ^{(nl)} ^{(fr)}			Hasselt	Mombeekdreef 98	50.88749°N 5.36648°E	22169 Info	
Farm ^{(nl)} ^{(fr)}			Hasselt	Sasput-Voogdijstraat 5	50.90292°N 5.34797°E	22170 Info	
Our Lady Chapel ^{(nl)}			Hasselt	Pietelbeekstraat	50.91412°N 5.36648°E	22171 Info	
Castle Pietelbeek ^{(nl)} ^{(fr)}			Hasselt	Pietelbeekstraat 85	50.91904°N 5.36964°E	22172 Info	
Farm Pietelbeekwinning ^{(nl)} ^{(fr)}			Hasselt	Pietelbeekstraat	50.91906°N 5.36979°E	22173 Info	
Elongated farmhouse ^{(nl)} ^{(fr)}			Hasselt	Ploegstraat 9	50.90967°N 5.35984°E	22175 Info	
Chapel ^{(nl)} ^{(fr)}			Hasselt	Rapertingenstraat	50.90512°N 5.36092°E	22176 Info	
"Scherpesteen Winning" closed farm ^{(nl)}			Hasselt	Rapertingenstraat 11	50.91516°N 5.36003°E	22177 Info	
Semi-closed farm ^{(nl)} ^{(fr)}			Hasselt	Rapertingenstraat 94	50.90993°N 5.36289°E	22178 Info	
Chapel ^{(nl)} ^{(fr)}			Hasselt	Singelbeekstraat	50.92235°N 5.35764°E	22180 Info	
former monastery farm ^{(nl)} ^{(fr)}			Hasselt	Tomstraat 55	50.89914°N 5.36725°E	22181 Info	
Timbered farmstead "Vandeweyerswinning" ^{(nl)} ^{(fr)}	Yes		Hasselt	Trekschurenstraat 37		22183 Info	
Semi-closed farm of 1912 ^{(nl)} ^{(fr)}			Hasselt	Trekschurenstraat 237	50.90316°N 5.34897°E	22188 Info	
Castle Trekschuren ^{(nl)}			Hasselt	Trekschurenstraat 245	50.90207°N 5.35055°E	22189 Info	
small farm ^{(nl)}			Hasselt	Boekstraat 80	50.92897°N 5.31828°E	22191 Info	
closed farm from 1788 ^{(nl)}			Hasselt	Wanbeekstraat 10	50.92008°N 5.29587°E	22192 Info	
chapel of Hilst ^{(nl)}	Yes		Hasselt	Oude Truierbaan	50.91318°N 5.31847°E	22193 Info	
"Winning van Martens", semi-gesloten hoeve ^{(nl)}			Hasselt	Runksterkiezel 125	50.92347°N 5.29100°E	22194 Info	
House in neoclassical style ^{(nl)} ^{(fr)}			Hasselt	Runkstersteenweg 38	50.92854°N 5.32976°E	22197 Info	
House in neoclassical style ^{(nl)} ^{(fr)}			Hasselt	Runkstersteenweg 40	50.92854°N 5.32976°E	22197 Info	
House in neoclassical style ^{(nl)} ^{(fr)}			Hasselt	Runkstersteenweg 42	50.92854°N 5.32976°E	22197 Info	
House in neoclassical style ^{(nl)} ^{(fr)}			Hasselt	Runkstersteenweg 44	50.92854°N 5.32976°E	22197 Info	
House in neoclassical style ^{(nl)} ^{(fr)}			Hasselt	Runkstersteenweg 46	50.92854°N 5.32976°E	22197 Info	
House in neoclassical style ^{(nl)} ^{(fr)}			Hasselt	Runkstersteenweg 48	50.92854°N 5.32976°E	22197 Info	
Parish of Saint-Hubert ^{(nl)} ^{(fr)}			Hasselt	Pastoor van Dijckstraat	50.92664°N 5.32870°E	22198 Info	
Neoclassical house ^{(nl)} ^{(fr)}			Hasselt	Spoorwegstraat 24	50.92903°N 5.33142°E	22199 Info	
Parish of Our Lady ^{(nl)} ^{(fr)}	Yes		Hasselt	Diestersteenweg 210	50.94773°N 5.25321°E	22202 Info	
Chapel of Our Lady of Consolation-der-Small Children ^{(nl)} ^{(fr)}	Yes		Hasselt	Diestersteenweg	50.94710°N 5.24933°E	22203 Info	
Flat, wide house ^{(nl)} ^{(fr)}			Hasselt	Koorstraat 6	50.94762°N 5.25392°E	22207 Info	
Two family home ^{(nl)} ^{(fr)}			Hasselt	Koorstraat 8-10	50.94773°N 5.25395°E	22208 Info	
Farm "Holrakkerwinning" also "Monnikenhof" ^{(nl)} ^{(fr)}			Hasselt	Monninxstraat 1	50.95733°N 5.25114°E	22209 Info	
Farmworkers Housing ^{(nl)} ^{(fr)}			Hasselt	Oude Holrakkerstraat 1	50.95831°N 5.25051°E	22210 Info	
elongated farm ^{(nl)} ^{(fr)}			Hasselt	Rijkelstraat 92	50.94706°N 5.26898°E	22213 Info	
Castle Rijsdaal neoclassical mansion ^{(nl)} ^{(fr)}			Hasselt	Herkkantstraat 177	50.93398°N 5.21734°E	22215 Info	
Farm "'t Molenhuys" ^{(nl)}			Hasselt	Herkkantstraat 66	50.92475°N 5.22820°E	22218 Info	
Farmhouse with separate components ^{(nl)} ^{(fr)}			Hasselt	Keizerlindestraat 28	50.93766°N 5.22873°E	22219 Info	
Farmhouse with separate components ^{(nl)} ^{(fr)}			Hasselt	Laarbeekstraat 33	50.94046°N 5.21806°E	22222 Info	
Parish of Our Lady Message ^{(nl)} ^{(fr)}	Yes		Hasselt	Spalbeekstraat 24	50.94965°N 5.23075°E	22227 Info	More images
Church of Spalbeek, now Chapel of Our Lady Message ^{(nl)} ^{(fr)}	Yes		Hasselt	Spalbeekstraat 67	50.95344°N 5.23056°E	22228 Info	
Village Inn, corner house ^{(nl)} ^{(fr)}	Yes		Hasselt	Spalbeekstraat 37	50.95055°N 5.22975°E	22229 Info	
Rectory ^{(nl)} ^{(fr)}			Hasselt	Spalbeekstraat 65	50.95321°N 5.23049°E	22231 Info	
Semi-closed farm "Kapelwinning" ^{(nl)} ^{(fr)}	Yes		Hasselt	Spalbeekstraat 66	50.95364°N 5.23133°E	22232 Info	
elongated farm of 1923 ^{(nl)} ^{(fr)}			Hasselt	Vliegeneinde 52	50.95968°N 5.22627°E	22233 Info	
elongated farm ^{(nl)} ^{(fr)}			Hasselt	Wijerstraat 119	50.93521°N 5.22576°E	22234 Info	
Semi-closed farm of 1733 ^{(nl)} ^{(fr)}			Hasselt	Wijerstraat 168	50.92938°N 5.22083°E	22236 Info	
House, former farm ^{(nl)} ^{(fr)}	Yes		Hasselt	Diepstraat 28	50.94270°N 5.30258°E	22237 Info	
elongated farm ^{(nl)} ^{(fr)}	Yes		Hasselt	Grote Baan 100	50.94169°N 5.29781°E	22239 Info	
rectory ^{(nl)} ^{(fr)}	Yes		Hasselt	Joris van Oostenrijkstraat 57	50.94348°N 5.30488°E	22240 Info	
Guild Hall ^{(nl)}	Yes		Hasselt	Joris van Oostenrijkstraat 59	50.94376°N 5.30501°E	22241 Info	
library ^{(nl)} ^{(fr)}	Yes		Hasselt	Joris van Oostenrijkstraat 61	50.94372°N 5.30526°E	22242 Info	
Farmstead "Aldenhof" ^{(nl)} ^{(fr)}			Hasselt	Kuringersteenweg 413	50.94434°N 5.28975°E	22243 Info	
St. Gertrude Parish ^{(nl)} ^{(fr)}	Yes		Hasselt	Joris van Oostenrijkstraat 78	50.94428°N 5.30618°E	22244 Info	
"Prinsenhof", remains of a water castle ^{(nl)}			Hasselt	Prinsenhofweg 21	50.94452°N 5.30858°E	22245 Info	More images
Herkenrode Abbey ^{(nl)}	Yes		Hasselt	Herkenrodeabdij 1	50.95700°N 5.28141°E	22246 Info	
Abbey Herkenrode ^{(nl)}	Yes		Hasselt	Herkenrodeabdij 1A	50.95700°N 5.28141°E	22246 Info	
Abbey Herkenrode ^{(nl)}	Yes		Hasselt	Herkenrodeabdij 2	50.95700°N 5.28141°E	22246 Info	
Abbey Herkenrode ^{(nl)}	Yes		Hasselt	Herkenrodeabdij 3	50.95700°N 5.28141°E	22246 Info	
Abbey Herkenrode ^{(nl)}	Yes		Hasselt	Herkenrodeabdij 4	50.95700°N 5.28141°E	22246 Info	
Abbey Herkenrode ^{(nl)}	Yes		Hasselt	Herkenrodeabdij 5	50.95700°N 5.28141°E	22246 Info	
Claes distillery ^{(nl)} ^{(fr)}			Hasselt	Herkenrodebosstraat 90	50.93874°N 5.27308°E	22249 Info	
Speelhof ^{(nl)}			Hasselt	Gebrandestraat 74	50.94713°N 5.31665°E	22254 Info	
St. Leonard's Chapel ^{(nl)} ^{(fr)}			Hasselt	Overdemerstraat	50.94773°N 5.30893°E	22255 Info	
Mansion "Kasteel van Schimpen" ^{(nl)}			Hasselt	Stevoortse kiezel 192	50.93027°N 5.27585°E	22257 Info	
Boswinning, former abbey farm Herkenrode ^{(nl)} ^{(fr)}			Hasselt	Stevoortse kiezel 100	50.93573°N 5.27501°E	22258 Info	
"De Hoef" semi-closed farm ^{(nl)}			Hasselt	Stevoortse kiezel 199	50.92789°N 5.27832°E	22259 Info	
Elongated farmhouse ^{(nl)} ^{(fr)}			Hasselt	Stevoortse kiezel 201	50.92890°N 5.27928°E	22260 Info	
Olmenhof, former abbey farm Herkenrode ^{(nl)} ^{(fr)}			Hasselt	Kuilbergstraat 1		22261 Info	
Parish Church St. Amand of 1853 ^{(nl)} ^{(fr)}	Yes		Hasselt	Sint-Amandusstraat	50.96674°N 5.28317°E	22262 Info	
St. John's Chapel, former Our Lady's Chapel ^{(nl)} ^{(fr)}			Hasselt	Beyenstraat	50.95220°N 5.26797°E	22264 Info	
elongated farm (former) ^{(nl)} ^{(fr)}			Hasselt	Beyenstraat 32	50.95235°N 5.26742°E	22265 Info	
elongated farm ^{(nl)} ^{(fr)}			Hasselt	Beyenstraat 33	50.95239°N 5.26796°E	22266 Info	
"Draakwinning" or "Hoeve Den Draak" ^{(nl)}			Hasselt	Roverstraat 9	50.95036°N 5.27602°E	22268 Info	
Tuiltermolen ^{(nl)}			Hasselt	Zolderse kiezel 220	50.95862°N 5.26949°E	22270 Info	
elongated farm ^{(nl)} ^{(fr)}			Hasselt	Zolderse kiezel 117	50.95309°N 5.26995°E	22271 Info	
Farm with loose components ^{(nl)} ^{(fr)}			Hasselt	Bekstraat 26	50.88994°N 5.32523°E	22273 Info	
Farm with loose components ^{(nl)} ^{(fr)}			Hasselt	Bekstraat 35	50.88879°N 5.32500°E	22274 Info	
Farm with loose components ^{(nl)} ^{(fr)}			Hasselt	Grote Roost 43	50.91325°N 5.28393°E	22276 Info	
country laborer's house ^{(nl)}			Hasselt	Grote Roost 113	50.91611°N 5.27271°E	22277 Info	
Semi-closed farm ^{(nl)} ^{(fr)}			Hasselt	Grote Roost 147	50.91748°N 5.26993°E	22278 Info	
Farm with loose components ^{(nl)} ^{(fr)}	Yes	GESLOOPT, heropbouw?	Hasselt	Hogebergstraat 22	50.90292°N 5.29958°E	22279 Info	
elongated farm ^{(nl)} ^{(fr)}			Hasselt	Hogebergstraat 24	50.90357°N 5.29972°E	22280 Info	
elongated farm ^{(nl)} ^{(fr)}			Hasselt	Hogebergstraat 28	50.90381°N 5.29957°E	22281 Info	
Canenhof or "Caenenhof", now farm ^{(nl)} ^{(fr)}			Hasselt	Hasseltse dreef 15	50.92006°N 5.26809°E	22283 Info	
chapel of the "Kattendans" ^{(nl)} ^{(fr)}	Yes		Hasselt	Kattendansstraat	50.90317°N 5.32798°E	22284 Info	
closed farm ^{(nl)} ^{(fr)}	Yes		Hasselt	Kattendansstraat 49	50.90339°N 5.32786°E	22288 Info	
Farm with loose components ^{(nl)} ^{(fr)}			Hasselt	Kattendansstraat 73	50.90122°N 5.33054°E	22289 Info	
Farm with loose components ^{(nl)} ^{(fr)}			Hasselt	Kattendansstraat 79	50.90089°N 5.33165°E	22291 Info	
closed farm ^{(nl)} ^{(fr)}	Yes		Hasselt	Kattendansstraat 114	50.89975°N 5.33132°E	22292 Info	
closed farm ^{(nl)} ^{(fr)}			Hasselt	Kattendansstraat 132	50.89728°N 5.33385°E	22293 Info	
Former mill waterwheel ^{(nl)} ^{(fr)}			Hasselt	Molenveldstraat	50.89654°N 5.30728°E	22294 Info	
Farm with loose components ^{(nl)} ^{(fr)}			Hasselt	Muntelbeekstraat 24	50.89057°N 5.33180°E	22295 Info	
Semi-closed farm ^{(nl)} ^{(fr)}			Hasselt	Muntelbeekstraat 29	50.88877°N 5.34637°E	22296 Info	
Ferme de la Bloen closed farm of 1881 ^{(nl)} ^{(fr)}			Hasselt	Oosterbeekstraat 60	50.90623°N 5.28693°E	22299 Info	
farmworker's house ^{(nl)}			Hasselt	Oude-Maasstraat 36	50.91869°N 5.29681°E	22300 Info	
elongated farm ^{(nl)} ^{(fr)}			Hasselt	Oude-Maasstraat 47	50.91856°N 5.29527°E	22301 Info	
Parish Church Saint-Lambert ^{(nl)} ^{(fr)}			Hasselt	Pastorijstraat	50.89835°N 5.30679°E	22302 Info	
rectory ^{(nl)} ^{(fr)}			Hasselt	Pastorijstraat 2	50.89887°N 5.30686°E	22303 Info	

== See also ==
- List of onroerend erfgoed in Limburg (Belgium)
- Hasselt
