= List of immovable heritage sites in Hasselt (part 2) =

This table shows an overview of the immovable heritage sites in the Flemish town Hasselt. This list is part of Belgium's national heritage.

Object	Status^{?}	Year/architect	Town/section	Address	Coordinates	Number^{?}	Image
house "De Gekroonde Haen" ^{(nl)}			Hasselt	Koning Albertstraat 9	50.92883°N 5.33688°E	21969 Info	
house "De Roode Haen" ^{(nl)}			Hasselt	Koning Albertstraat 11	50.92883°N 5.33688°E	21970 Info	
house "Die Gulde Waeghe" ^{(nl)}			Hasselt	Koning Albertstraat 13	50.92875°N 5.33679°E	21971 Info	
house "De Gekroonde Fazanthaen" ^{(nl)}			Hasselt	Koning Albertstraat 14	50.92888°N 5.33742°E	21972 Info	
house "De Clock" ^{(nl)}			Hasselt	Koning Albertstraat 16-18	50.92879°N 5.33738°E	21973 Info	
house "De Witte Man" ^{(nl)}			Hasselt	Koning Albertstraat 20	50.92875°N 5.33732°E	21974 Info	
house "Moriaenskop" or "In den Moriaan" ^{(nl)}			Hasselt	Koning Albertstraat 24	50.92864°N 5.33740°E	21975 Info	
house "De Hertog van Beieren" ^{(nl)}			Hasselt	Koning Albertstraat 25	50.92822°N 5.33665°E	21976 Info	
house "Het Groen Peert" ^{(nl)}			Hasselt	Koning Albertstraat 39	50.92782°N 5.33642°E	21977 Info	
house "Den Coninck van Spagnien" van 1761 ^{(nl)}			Hasselt	Koning Albertstraat 42	50.92805°N 5.33751°E	21979 Info	
house "De Gulden Leeuw" ^{(nl)}			Hasselt	Koning Albertstraat 43-45	50.92772°N 5.33625°E	21980 Info	
house "Het Vosken" ^{(nl)}			Hasselt	Koning Albertstraat 52	50.92774°N 5.33710°E	21981 Info	
wide house ^{(nl)} ^{(fr)}			Hasselt	Koning Albertstraat 54	50.92771°N 5.33701°E	21982 Info	
Neoclassical tinged house ^{(nl)} ^{(fr)}			Hasselt	Koning Albertstraat 64	50.92748°N 5.33661°E	21983 Info	
Neoclassical tinged house ^{(nl)} ^{(fr)}	Yes		Hasselt	Koningin Astridlaan 31	50.93173°N 5.33188°E	21984 Info	
House Of Straelen, art nouveau mansion with weft ^{(nl)} ^{(fr)}	Yes		Hasselt	Koningin Astridlaan 35	50.93173°N 5.33139°E	21985 Info	
Neoclassical mansion tinted ^{(nl)} ^{(fr)}			Hasselt	Koningin Astridlaan 38	50.93143°N 5.32994°E	21986 Info	
House designed by H. Hoste ^{(nl)} ^{(fr)}	Yes		Hasselt	Koningin Astridlaan 81-83	50.93253°N 5.32887°E	21988 Info	
Warehouse and house ^{(nl)} ^{(fr)}	Yes		Hasselt	Koningin Astridlaan 77-79	50.93246°N 5.32900°E	21989 Info	
wide house ^{(nl)} ^{(fr)}			Hasselt	Kuringersteenweg 9	50.93308°N 5.32746°E	21990 Info	
wide house ^{(nl)} ^{(fr)}			Hasselt	Kuringersteenweg 11	50.93308°N 5.32746°E	21990 Info	
wide house ^{(nl)} ^{(fr)}			Hasselt	Kuringersteenweg 13	50.93308°N 5.32746°E	21990 Info	
wide house ^{(nl)} ^{(fr)}			Hasselt	Kuringersteenweg 15	50.93308°N 5.32746°E	21990 Info	
The Broom House of 1934 ^{(nl)} ^{(fr)}	Yes		Hasselt	Kuringersteenweg 134	50.93490°N 5.32058°E	21991 Info	
Residential and warehouse ^{(nl)} ^{(fr)}			Hasselt	Kuringersteenweg 146	50.93494°N 5.31953°E	21992 Info	
Property with art deco impact ^{(nl)} ^{(fr)}			Hasselt	Lombaardstraat 6	50.93059°N 5.33708°E	21993 Info	
Lyceum in classical style ^{(nl)} ^{(fr)}	Yes		Hasselt	Lombaardstraat 16	50.93066°N 5.33632°E	21995 Info	
Property in eclectic style of 1903 ^{(nl)} ^{(fr)}			Hasselt	Lombaardstraat 17	50.93096°N 5.33579°E	21996 Info	
Former provincial council building, designed by P. Sainteno ^{(nl)} ^{(fr)}	Yes		Hasselt	Lombaardstraat 19-23	50.93147°N 5.33506°E	21997 Info	More images
Hotel of the governor mansion ^{(nl)} ^{(fr)}			Hasselt	Lombaardstraat 25	50.93147°N 5.33506°E	21998 Info	
Rags Chapel, Our Lady's Chapel ^{(nl)} ^{(fr)}			Hasselt	Luikersteenweg	50.91221°N 5.35125°E	21999 Info	
row house ^{(nl)} ^{(fr)}			Hasselt	Luikersteenweg 2	50.92682°N 5.33644°E	22000 Info	
row house ^{(nl)} ^{(fr)}			Hasselt	Luikersteenweg 4	50.92682°N 5.33644°E	22000 Info	
row house ^{(nl)} ^{(fr)}			Hasselt	Luikersteenweg 6	50.92682°N 5.33644°E	22000 Info	
wide house ^{(nl)} ^{(fr)}			Hasselt	Luikersteenweg 27	50.92597°N 5.33666°E	22001 Info	
wide house ^{(nl)} ^{(fr)}			Hasselt	Luikersteenweg 29	50.92597°N 5.33666°E	22001 Info	
wide house ^{(nl)} ^{(fr)}			Hasselt	Luikersteenweg 31	50.92597°N 5.33666°E	22001 Info	
Neoclassical mansion ^{(nl)} ^{(fr)}			Hasselt	Luikersteenweg 41	50.92430°N 5.33801°E	22003 Info	
Neoclassical mansion ^{(nl)} ^{(fr)}			Hasselt	Luikersteenweg 45	50.92430°N 5.33801°E	22003 Info	
Neoclassical mansion ^{(nl)} ^{(fr)}			Hasselt	Luikersteenweg 61	50.92430°N 5.33801°E	22003 Info	
Mansion ^{(nl)} ^{(fr)}			Hasselt	Luikersteenweg 62-64	50.92175°N 5.34222°E	22004 Info	
Herenhouse "Les Bergères" ^{(nl)}			Hasselt	Luikersteenweg 132	50.92175°N 5.34222°E	22004 Info	
House in eclectic style ^{(nl)} ^{(fr)}			Hasselt	Luikersteenweg 66	50.92427°N 5.33965°E	22005 Info	
House in eclectic style ^{(nl)} ^{(fr)}			Hasselt	Luikersteenweg 68	50.92427°N 5.33965°E	22005 Info	
House in eclectic style ^{(nl)} ^{(fr)}			Hasselt	Luikersteenweg 70	50.92427°N 5.33965°E	22005 Info	
House in eclectic style ^{(nl)} ^{(fr)}			Hasselt	Luikersteenweg 72	50.92427°N 5.33965°E	22005 Info	
House in eclectic style ^{(nl)} ^{(fr)}			Hasselt	Luikersteenweg 74	50.92427°N 5.33965°E	22005 Info	
Two Tower District high-rise ^{(nl)} ^{(fr)}			Hasselt	Torenplein	50.92883°N 5.34065°E	22006 Info	
house "De Swaen" ^{(nl)}			Hasselt	Maastrichterstraat 2	50.92923°N 5.33843°E	22007 Info	
house "De Silveren Lamp" ^{(nl)}			Hasselt	Maastrichterstraat 4	50.92923°N 5.33843°E	22007 Info	
house "De Perroen" ^{(nl)}			Hasselt	Maastrichterstraat 5	50.92923°N 5.33843°E	22007 Info	
house "De Cleyne Valck" ^{(nl)}			Hasselt	Maastrichterstraat 6	50.92923°N 5.33843°E	22007 Info	
house "De Cleyne Maeght van Maestricht" ^{(nl)}			Hasselt	Maastrichterstraat 10	50.92923°N 5.33843°E	22007 Info	
house "De Dry Druyven" or "De Waepens van Hasselt" ^{(nl)}			Hasselt	Maastrichterstraat 14	50.92923°N 5.33843°E	22007 Info	
house "De Paepegaey" ^{(nl)}			Hasselt	Maastrichterstraat 16	50.92923°N 5.33843°E	22007 Info	
house "De Gulden Clock" ^{(nl)}			Hasselt	Maastrichterstraat 21-23	50.92923°N 5.33843°E	22007 Info	
house "Sint-Antonius" ^{(nl)}			Hasselt	Maastrichterstraat 25	50.92923°N 5.33843°E	22007 Info	
house "Het Root Huysken" or "Het Root Crays" ^{(nl)}			Hasselt	Maastrichterstraat 27	50.92923°N 5.33843°E	22007 Info	
house "De Wijndroef" ^{(nl)}			Hasselt	Maastrichterstraat 29	50.92923°N 5.33843°E	22007 Info	
Herenhouse "De Valck" ^{(nl)}	Yes		Hasselt	Maastrichterstraat 1-3	50.92847°N 5.33820°E	22008 Info	
house "Het Schip" ^{(nl)}			Hasselt	Maastrichterstraat 9	50.92886°N 5.33803°E	22009 Info	
house "Het Ancker" ^{(nl)}			Hasselt	Maastrichterstraat 22	50.92931°N 5.33906°E	22010 Info	
house "De Kleine Halle" ^{(nl)}			Hasselt	Maastrichterstraat 30	50.92960°N 5.33920°E	22011 Info	
house "De Biechtstoel" ^{(nl)}			Hasselt	Maastrichterstraat 32	50.92960°N 5.33920°E	22011 Info	
Property of 1776 ^{(nl)} ^{(fr)}			Hasselt	Maastrichterstraat 31	50.92912°N 5.33910°E	22012 Info	
house "Den Cruysancker" van 1776 ^{(nl)}			Hasselt	Maastrichterstraat 33	50.92912°N 5.33910°E	22013 Info	
house "De Oliphant" ^{(nl)}			Hasselt	Maastrichterstraat 38	50.92970°N 5.33969°E	22014 Info	
Neoclassicistisch house "Den Voerman" ^{(nl)}			Hasselt	Maastrichterstraat 40	50.92952°N 5.33963°E	22015 Info	
Broad House in eclectic style ^{(nl)} ^{(fr)}			Hasselt	Maastrichterstraat 46	50.92943°N 5.33977°E	22016 Info	
Broad House in eclectic style ^{(nl)} ^{(fr)}			Hasselt	Maastrichterstraat 48	50.92943°N 5.33977°E	22016 Info	
Property in eclectic style ^{(nl)} ^{(fr)}			Hasselt	Maastrichterstraat 56	50.92951°N 5.34004°E	22017 Info	
Property in eclectic style ^{(nl)} ^{(fr)}			Hasselt	Maastrichterstraat 60	50.92954°N 5.34012°E	22020 Info	
Hotel Corswarem, presently the municipal music hall ^{(nl)} ^{(fr)}	Yes		Hasselt	Maastrichterstraat 63	50.92955°N 5.34076°E	22021 Info	
house "De Pasteye" van 1687 ^{(nl)}	Yes		Hasselt	Maastrichterstraat 65	50.92971°N 5.34088°E	22023 Info	
house "De Witte Haen" ^{(nl)}			Hasselt	Maastrichterstraat 69	50.92984°N 5.34088°E	22024 Info	
house ^{(nl)} ^{(fr)}			Hasselt	Maastrichterstraat 70	50.92981°N 5.34018°E	22025 Info	
house "De Trouw" ^{(nl)}			Hasselt	Maastrichterstraat 73	50.92984°N 5.34112°E	22026 Info	
house ^{(nl)} ^{(fr)}			Hasselt	Maastrichterstraat 75	50.92985°N 5.34120°E	22027 Info	
Burger House in eclectic style ^{(nl)} ^{(fr)}			Hasselt	Maastrichterstraat 76	50.92993°N 5.34030°E	22028 Info	
The "Waerden Hof", city Academy ^{(nl)} ^{(fr)}	Yes		Hasselt	Maastrichterstraat 85	50.92973°N 5.34235°E	22029 Info	
house ^{(nl)} ^{(fr)}			Hasselt	Maastrichterstraat 87	50.92998°N 5.34224°E	22030 Info	
house "Den Gulden Hondt" ^{(nl)}			Hasselt	Maastrichterstraat 89-91	50.92998°N 5.34224°E	22031 Info	
house "De Reyger", nu school ^{(nl)}	Yes		Hasselt	Maastrichterstraat 96	50.93003°N 5.34106°E	22032 Info	
house "De Blauwe Hondt" ^{(nl)}			Hasselt	Maastrichterstraat 98	50.93023°N 5.34192°E	22033 Info	
house "De Groote Clock" or "De Gulde Clock" ^{(nl)}			Hasselt	Maastrichterstraat 99	50.92998°N 5.34279°E	22034 Info	
Refugiehuis Herkenrode Abbey (former) ^{(nl)} ^{(fr)}	Yes		Hasselt	Maastrichterstraat 100	50.93081°N 5.34176°E	22035 Info	More images
Neoclassical style mansion ^{(nl)} ^{(fr)}	Yes		Hasselt	Maastrichterstraat 102	50.93064°N 5.34303°E	22036 Info	
house ^{(nl)} ^{(fr)}			Hasselt	Minderbroedersstraat 7	50.93210°N 5.33758°E	22037 Info	
house ^{(nl)} ^{(fr)}	Yes		Hasselt	Minderbroedersstraat 11	50.93213°N 5.33734°E	22038 Info	
Monastery and Church of the Friars Minor ^{(nl)} ^{(fr)}	Yes		Hasselt	Minderbroedersstraat 23	50.93245°N 5.33669°E	22039 Info	More images
Workers Homes ^{(nl)} ^{(fr)}	Yes		Hasselt	Minderbroedersstraat 18-26	50.93171°N 5.33699°E	22040 Info	
house ^{(nl)} ^{(fr)}			Hasselt	Minderbroedersstraat 44	50.93188°N 5.33633°E	22041 Info	
Neoclassical mansion ^{(nl)} ^{(fr)}			Hasselt	Oude Kuringerbaan 107	50.93580°N 5.32295°E	22043 Info	
Paalsteen, boundary stone of 1666 ^{(nl)} ^{(fr)}	Yes		Hasselt	Langvennestraat	50.96289°N 5.33969°E	22044 Info	
house "De Wolf" ^{(nl)}			Hasselt	Paardsdemerstraat 13	50.93190°N 5.33915°E	22045 Info	
house "De Nachtegaal", voormalige school ^{(nl)}			Hasselt	Paardsdemerstraat 15	50.93197°N 5.33929°E	22046 Info	
Two houses, corner building ^{(nl)} ^{(fr)}			Hasselt	de Schiervellaan 2	50.93032°N 5.33278°E	22048 Info	
Two houses, corner building ^{(nl)} ^{(fr)}			Hasselt	de Schiervellaan 4	50.93032°N 5.33278°E	22048 Info	
House, single house ^{(nl)} ^{(fr)}			Hasselt	de Schiervellaan 6	50.93026°N 5.33281°E	22050 Info	
Mansion and fortress tower foundations ^{(nl)} ^{(fr)}			Hasselt	de Schiervellaan 26	50.92895°N 5.33349°E	22053 Info	
State Police Barracks from 1879 ^{(nl)} ^{(fr)}	Yes		Hasselt	Guffenslaan 18	50.92765°N 5.33816°E	22054 Info	
Saint Joseph College, 1881 ^{(nl)} ^{(fr)}	Yes		Hasselt	Guffenslaan 27	50.92708°N 5.33922°E	22055 Info	
Townhouse, single house ^{(nl)} ^{(fr)}			Hasselt	Guffenslaan 33	50.92741°N 5.34114°E	22056 Info	
Provincial School for Midwives in 1912 ^{(nl)} ^{(fr)}	Yes		Hasselt	Guffenslaan 39	50.92762°N 5.34256°E	22059 Info	
Sisters Clares convent and chapel-coletinen ^{(nl)} ^{(fr)}	Yes		Hasselt	Guffenslaan 43	50.92895°N 5.34371°E	22060 Info	
Atheneum of 1865 ^{(nl)} ^{(fr)}	Yes		Hasselt	Guffenslaan 78-82	50.92879°N 5.34168°E	22061 Info	
House in eclectic style ^{(nl)} ^{(fr)}			Hasselt	Guldensporenplein 16	50.92963°N 5.34446°E	22062 Info	
House in eclectic style ^{(nl)} ^{(fr)}			Hasselt	Guldensporenplein 18	50.92963°N 5.34446°E	22062 Info	
House in eclectic style ^{(nl)} ^{(fr)}			Hasselt	Guldensporenplein 20	50.92963°N 5.34446°E	22062 Info	
House in eclectic style ^{(nl)} ^{(fr)}			Hasselt	Guldensporenplein 22	50.92963°N 5.34446°E	22062 Info	
Colonel Dusart Barracks ^{(nl)} ^{(fr)}			Hasselt	Kolonel Dusartplein	50.93256°N 5.34415°E	22063 Info	
neoclassical mansion ^{(nl)} ^{(fr)}			Hasselt	Kolonel Dusartplein 20	50.93125°N 5.34309°E	22064 Info	
Property in eclectic style ^{(nl)} ^{(fr)}			Hasselt	Leopoldplein 24	50.92765°N 5.33438°E	22066 Info	
Property in eclectic style ^{(nl)} ^{(fr)}			Hasselt	Leopoldplein 26	50.92765°N 5.33438°E	22066 Info	
Neoclassical mansion tinted ^{(nl)} ^{(fr)}			Hasselt	Leopoldplein 28	50.92770°N 5.33426°E	22068 Info	
Neotraditioneel tinted houses ^{(nl)} ^{(fr)}			Hasselt	Leopoldplein 30	50.92757°N 5.33400°E	22069 Info	
Neotraditioneel tinted houses ^{(nl)} ^{(fr)}			Hasselt	Leopoldplein 32	50.92757°N 5.33400°E	22069 Info	
Neoclassical single house of 1904 ^{(nl)} ^{(fr)}			Hasselt	Leopoldplein 38	50.92784°N 5.33372°E	22070 Info	
Property in eclectic style ^{(nl)} ^{(fr)}			Hasselt	Martelarenlaan 20	50.93408°N 5.34079°E	22072 Info	
House in eclectic style of 1904 ^{(nl)} ^{(fr)}			Hasselt	Thonissenlaan 49	50.93342°N 5.33635°E	22073 Info	
House in eclectic style of 1904 ^{(nl)} ^{(fr)}			Hasselt	Thonissenlaan 51	50.93342°N 5.33635°E	22073 Info	
House in eclectic style of 1904 ^{(nl)} ^{(fr)}			Hasselt	Thonissenlaan 53	50.93342°N 5.33635°E	22073 Info	
House in eclectic style of 1904 ^{(nl)} ^{(fr)}			Hasselt	Thonissenlaan 55	50.93342°N 5.33635°E	22073 Info	
House in eclectic style of 1904 ^{(nl)} ^{(fr)}			Hasselt	Thonissenlaan 57	50.93342°N 5.33635°E	22073 Info	
House in eclectic style of 1904 ^{(nl)} ^{(fr)}			Hasselt	Thonissenlaan 59	50.93342°N 5.33635°E	22073 Info	
House in eclectic style of 1904 ^{(nl)} ^{(fr)}			Hasselt	Thonissenlaan 61	50.93342°N 5.33635°E	22073 Info	
House in eclectic style ^{(nl)} ^{(fr)}			Hasselt	Thonissenlaan 60	50.93361°N 5.33534°E	22074 Info	
House in eclectic style ^{(nl)} ^{(fr)}			Hasselt	Thonissenlaan 62	50.93361°N 5.33534°E	22074 Info	
House in eclectic style ^{(nl)} ^{(fr)}			Hasselt	Thonissenlaan 64	50.93361°N 5.33534°E	22074 Info	
House in eclectic style ^{(nl)} ^{(fr)}			Hasselt	Thonissenlaan 66	50.93361°N 5.33534°E	22074 Info	
House in eclectic style ^{(nl)} ^{(fr)}			Hasselt	Thonissenlaan 68	50.93361°N 5.33534°E	22074 Info	
House in eclectic style ^{(nl)} ^{(fr)}			Hasselt	Thonissenlaan 63	50.93366°N 5.33674°E	22078 Info	
House in eclectic style ^{(nl)} ^{(fr)}			Hasselt	Thonissenlaan 65	50.93366°N 5.33674°E	22078 Info	
House in eclectic style ^{(nl)} ^{(fr)}			Hasselt	Thonissenlaan 67/2	50.93366°N 5.33674°E	22078 Info	
House in eclectic style ^{(nl)} ^{(fr)}			Hasselt	Thonissenlaan 69	50.93366°N 5.33674°E	22078 Info	
House in eclectic style ^{(nl)} ^{(fr)}			Hasselt	Thonissenlaan 71	50.93366°N 5.33674°E	22078 Info	
Home "The Brabant Huyck" of 1652 ^{(nl)} ^{(fr)}	Yes		Hasselt	Raamstraat	50.93135°N 5.33878°E	22083 Info	
Buildings former distillery ^{(nl)} ^{(fr)}			Hasselt	Zuivelmarkt 22	50.93132°N 5.33979°E	22084 Info	
Corner house ^{(nl)} ^{(fr)}			Hasselt	Ridder Portmansstraat 2	50.92928°N 5.33356°E	22085 Info	
Property of 1872 ^{(nl)} ^{(fr)}			Hasselt	Ridder Portmansstraat 4-6	50.92931°N 5.33340°E	22086 Info	
houses ^{(nl)} ^{(fr)}			Hasselt	Ridderstraat 12	50.92817°N 5.33584°E	22087 Info	
houses ^{(nl)} ^{(fr)}			Hasselt	Ridderstraat 14	50.92817°N 5.33584°E	22087 Info	
houses ^{(nl)} ^{(fr)}			Hasselt	Ridderstraat 16	50.92817°N 5.33584°E	22087 Info	
Mansion "The Red Gate" ^{(nl)} ^{(fr)}	Yes		Hasselt	Schrijnwerkersstraat 7	50.93089°N 5.33614°E	22088 Info	
House "The Abraham", former city farm ^{(nl)} ^{(fr)}	Yes		Hasselt	Schrijnwerkersstraat 9-11	50.93177°N 5.33614°E	22089 Info	
house ^{(nl)} ^{(fr)}			Hasselt	Sint-Jozefsstraat 5	50.92892°N 5.33896°E	22092 Info	
water tower ^{(nl)} ^{(fr)}			Hasselt	Sint-Truidersteenweg	50.91762°N 5.32720°E	22095 Info	
St. Quintinus Cathedral, Hasselt ^{(nl)} ^{(fr)}	Yes		Hasselt	Vismarkt	50.92992°N 5.33892°E	22097 Info	More images
"Het Wit Cruys" ^{(nl)}			Hasselt	Vismarkt 1	50.92960°N 5.33840°E	22098 Info	
house ^{(nl)} ^{(fr)}			Hasselt	Vismarkt 3	50.92960°N 5.33840°E	22099 Info	

== See also ==
- List of onroerend erfgoed in Limburg (Belgium)
- Hasselt
