= Conrad I of Zähringen =

Rector of Burgundy (c. 1090–1152)

Conrad I
- Duke of Zähringen
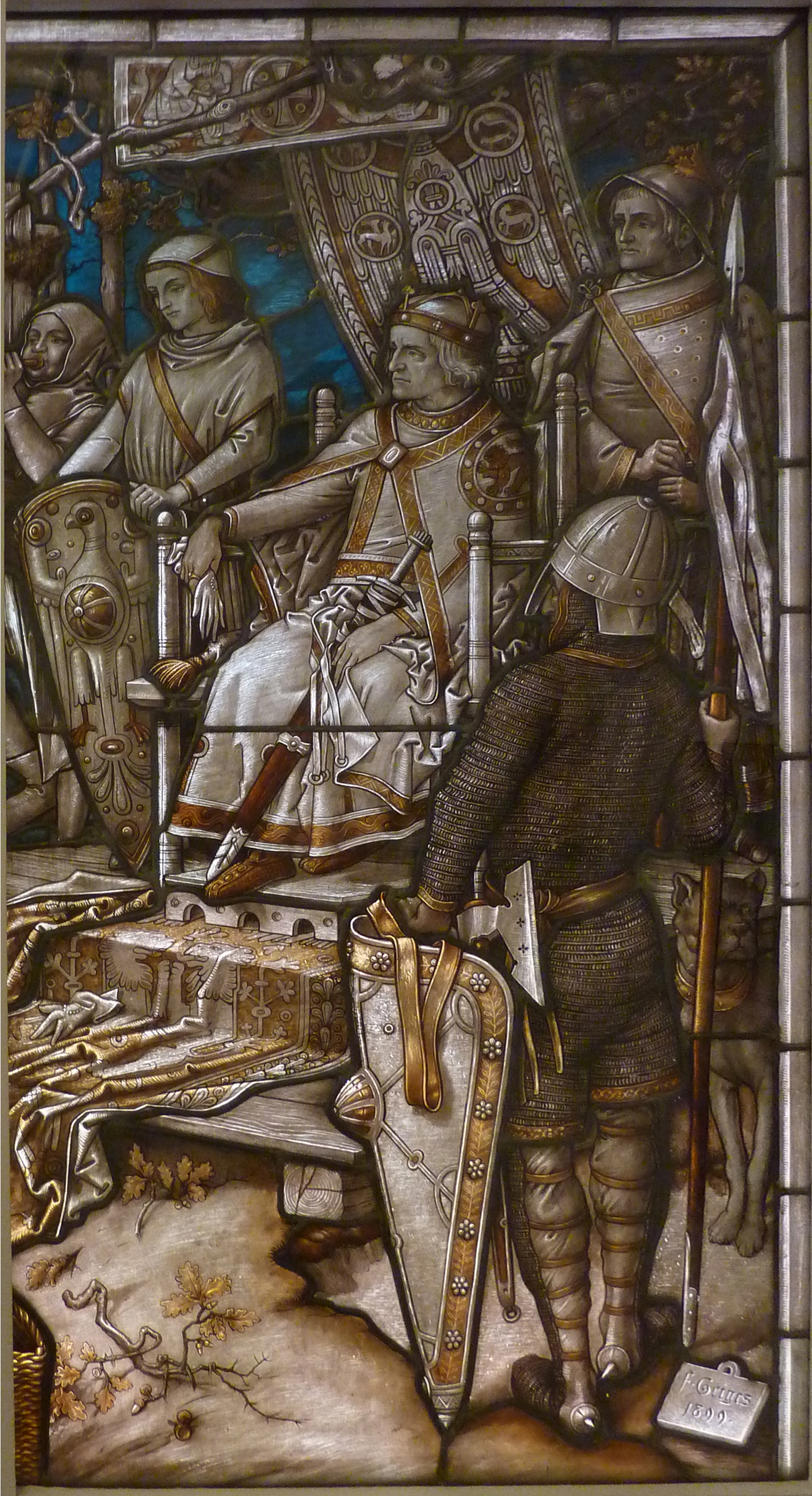
- Conrad granting city rights to Freiburg
- Born: c. 1090
- Died: 8 January 1152; Constance
- Buried: Abbey of Saint Peter in the Black Forest
- Noble family: House of Zähringen
- Spouse: Clementia of Luxembourg-Namur
- Issue: Berthold IV; Adalbert I Clementia of Zähringen; Rudolf of Zähringen
- Father: Berthold II, Duke of Swabia
- Mother: Agnes of Rheinfelden

Conrad I (c. 1090 – 8 January 1152) was Duke of Zähringen from 1122 until his death and also Rector of Burgundy from 1127. He spent most of his life stemming the growing power of the House of Hohenstaufen and, to this end, allied himself with the House of Guelph.

== Life ==
Conrad was a son of Duke Berthold II and his wife, Agnes of Rheinfelden. In 1120, Conrad and his elder brother Berthold III granted city rights to Freiburg. In 1122, Conrad succeeded Berthold III as Duke of Zähringen.

In 1127, he came into conflict with Count Reginald III of Burgundy, because both men claimed the inheritance of Conrad's murdered nephew William III. In this situation, he benefitted from the situation Emperor Lothar III found himself in. Lothar urgently needed support against his Hohenstaufen rivals, and he supported Conrad's claim. He rejected Reginald's claim, with the dubious argument that Reginald had failed to comply with his duty to attend the emperor's court. Conrad received the title rector of Burgundy, which denoted, as least theoretically, a kind of representative of the emperor in the Kingdom of Burgundy.

In 1138, King Conrad III of Germany grabbed power and the power conflict between the Guelphs and the Hohenstaufen relaxed. Until the late 1150s, the dukes of Zähringen were among the Hohenstaufen's most loyal supporters.

Conrad I died in 1152 in Constance and was buried in the family vault in the Abbey of Saint Peter in the Black Forest.

== Marriage and issue ==
Conrad was married to Clementia of Namur, daughter of Godfrey I, Count of Namur and had at least five children:

- Berthold IV, duke of Zähringen
- Adalbert I, founder of the line Dukes of Teck
- Clementia, married Henry the Lion
- Rudolf, Archbishop of Mainz
- Hugh, Duke of Ullenburg (Note: Hugo named himself for his seat in Ullenburg, and he inherited possessions in Breisgau and Ortenau. He also used the title of dux (even though there is no "Duchy of Ullenburg").)

== Sources ==
- Lyon, Jonathan R. (2013). Princely Brother and Sisters: The Sibling Bond in German Politics, 1100-1250. Cornell University Press.
- Zotz, Thomas (2018). Die Zähringer: Dynastie und Herrschaft. W. Kohlhammer. ISBN 9783170309739.
- Eberhard Holz and Wolfgang Huschner (eds.): Deutsche Fürsten des Mittelalters, Edition Leipzig, Leipzig, 1995, ISBN 3-361-00437-3
- Georg von Wyß (1882). "Konrad (Herzog von Zähringen)" . Allgemeine Deutsche Biographie (in German). Vol. 16. Leipzig: Duncker & Humblot. pp. 634–638.

Conrad I of Zähringen House of Zähringen Born: c. 1090 Died: 8 January 1152
Preceded by Berthold III	Duke of Zähringen; 1122-1152	Succeeded by Berthold IV
