= Herkenrode Abbey =

Catholic monastery in Limburg, Belgium

Coordinates: 50.9559°N 5.2785°E

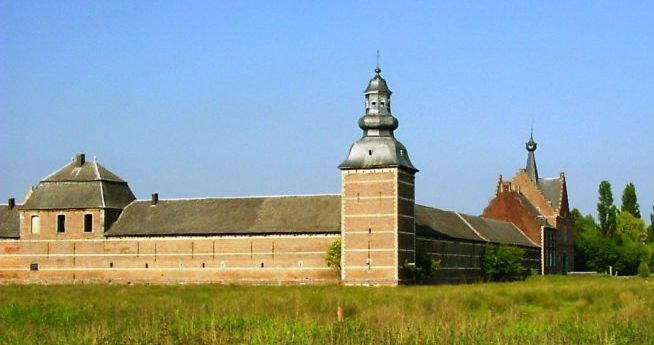
General view

Herkenrode Abbey (Limburgish: Abdij van Herkenrode) was a Catholic monastery of Cistercian nuns located in Kuringen, part of the municipality of Hasselt, which lies in the province of Limburg, Belgium.

Since 1972 some of the surviving buildings have served as the home of a community of the Canonesses of the Holy Sepulchre, who have since built a new retreat center and church on the site.

In 1974 the buildings and the surrounding estate were designated and since then protected as a national historical monument and landscape.

== History ==
=== Cistercians ===
The abbey was founded in or about 1182 by Gerard, Count of Loon, who sold a part of his lands to raise funds for his participation in the Crusades, and used some of the proceeds to endow a Cistercian monastery for nuns. (Some historians claim that he was forced to do so by Rudolf of Zähringen, the Prince-Bishop of Liège, as a penance for having burnt down the collegiate church of Tongeren).

In 1217 the abbey was formally accepted into the Cistercian Order, the first, and also the greatest and wealthiest, women's monastery of the Order in the Low Countries. The nuns referred to themselves as the "noble ladies of the Order of Cîteaux of the County of Loon" (Dutch: adellijke dames van de orde van Cîteaux van het graafschap Loon).

After Count Gerard was killed during the Third Crusade at the Siege of Acre in 1191, his body was brought back by the same Archbishop Rudolph, who had led an army to the siege. Rudolph reached, though, only as far as Switzerland, dying there on the way home. Gerard was buried in the church of the abbey he had founded, which from then on became the burial place of all the Counts of Loon. This custom continued up to the last Count to die with that title, Dietrich (or Theodoric) of Sponheim (d. 1361), who was refused burial here because he had been excommunicated.

In 1366 the County of Loon passed into the possession of the Prince-Bishops of Liège, with whom the nuns succeeded in remaining on good terms.

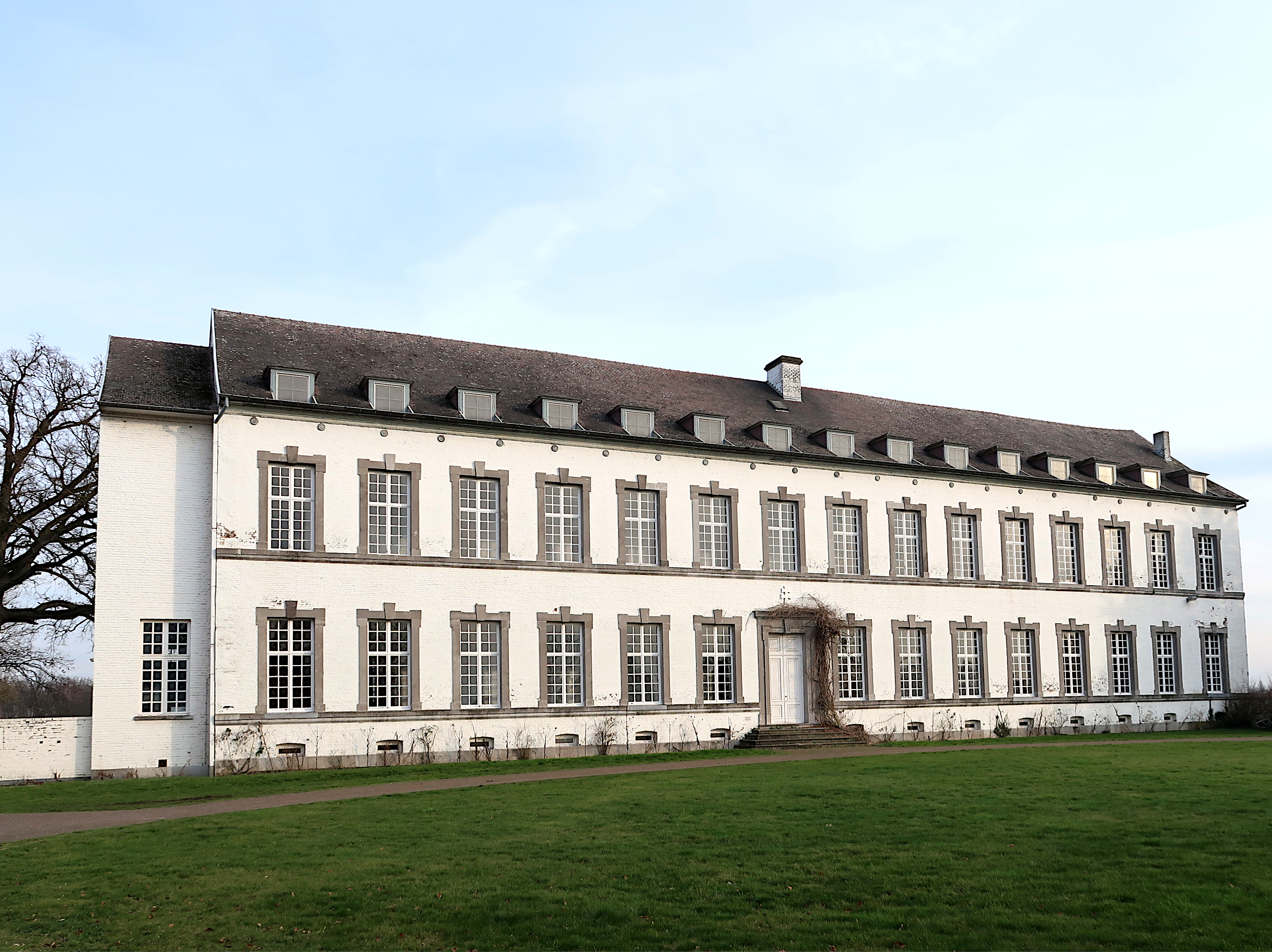
Abbess's quarters, built in 1722

During the 15th century the abbey, like many others, suffered a severe decline, but from around 1500 enjoyed a revival. In the 18th century a total reconstruction was planned, of which the Neo-Classical abbesses' lodgings was built, as well as an English garden, still intact, with exotic trees.

The French Revolutionary Army occupied the region in 1795 and annexed it to France. During a policy of anti-Catholic measures which were in effect from 1795 to 1799, they seized the abbey and expelled the nuns, as a result of which the monastic community was permanently dispersed. The abbey was sold to Claes and Libotton, after which the buildings gradually fell into disrepair. In 1826 a fire destroyed much of the church, which had been in use as a factory, after the stained glass windows had been replaced by clear glass. In 1844 the remaining ruins were demolished, including the mausoleum of the Counts of Loon. Many artworks from the church have survived and are kept in museums.

=== Stained glass ===
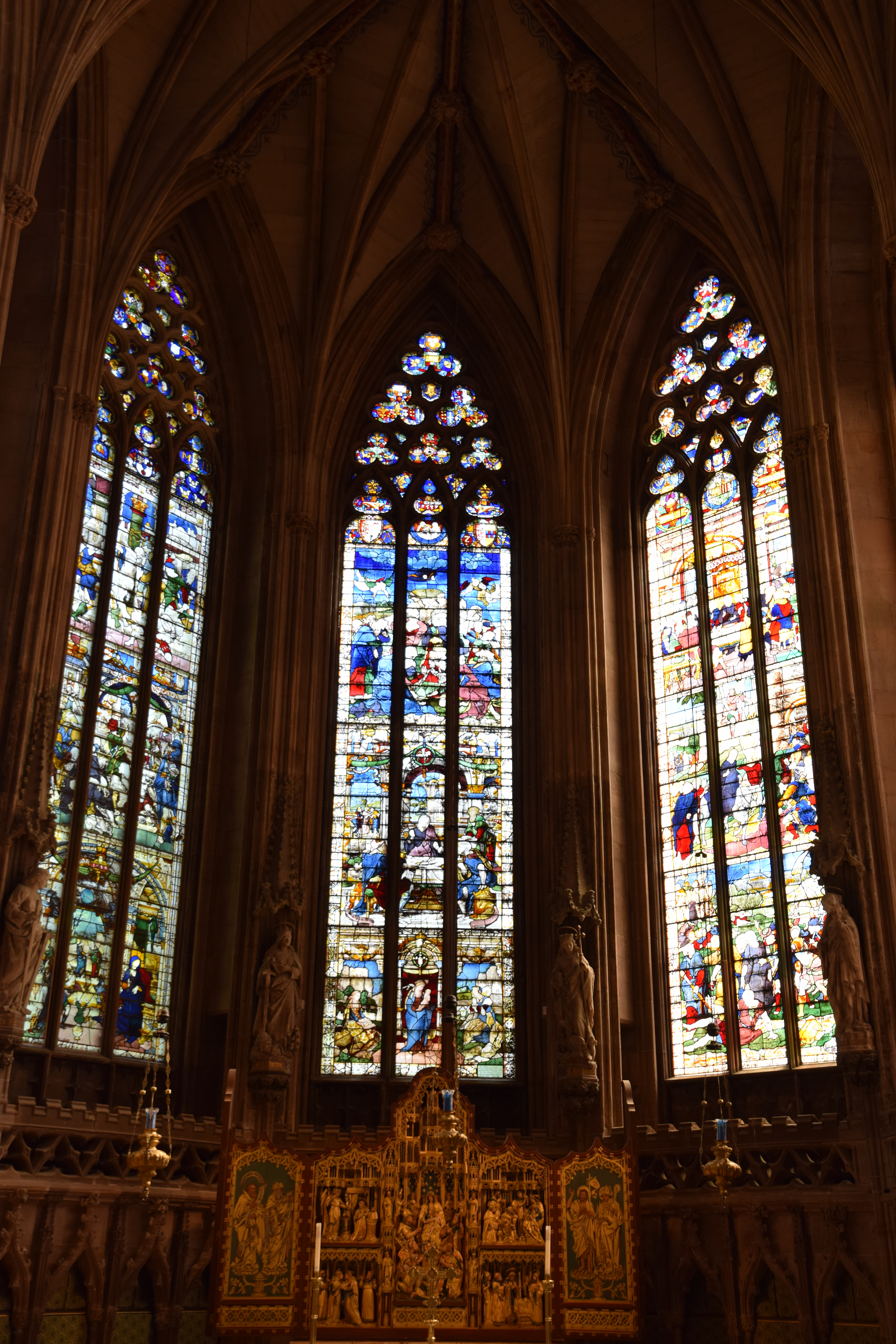
Herkenrode glass in the Lady Chapel of Lichfield Cathedral

After the abbey was dissolved by Revolutionary France in 1795, some of the stained glass was purchased by Sir Brooke Boothby, 6th Baronet. Some was installed in 1803 in the Lady Chapel of Lichfield Cathedral and some in St Mary's Church, Shrewsbury. The British ambassador to The Netherlands, Charles Bagot, procured glass from the owner of the dissolved abbey and presented it in 1818 to St Giles' Church, Ashtead, Surrey; the glass in the east window is attributed to the 16th-century artist Lambert Lombard of Liège.

The surviving 16th-century glass from Herkenrode constitutes the most significant body of Flemish stained glass in the world.

=== Canonesses ===
In 1972 the Canonesses Regular of the Holy Sepulchre bought part of the old abbey grounds with their remaining buildings. They have since built a new monastery and retreat center. Ten years later, they built the Church of the Risen Lord, which now serves the canonesses and their guests.

Much restoration work has taken place on the remaining buildings of the previous abbey, all of which date from the 16th-18th centuries.

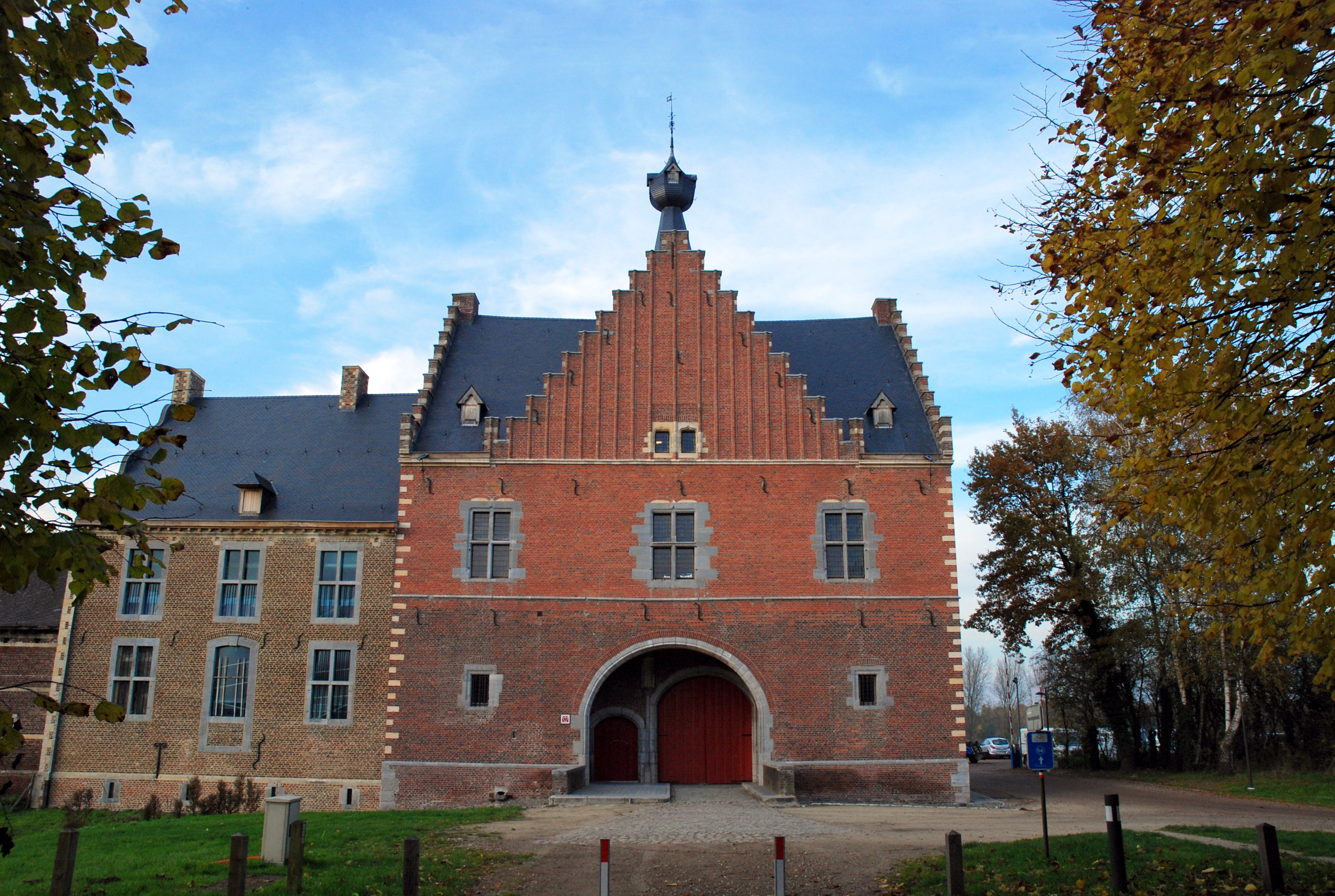
The gate house, with the porter's lodge to the left

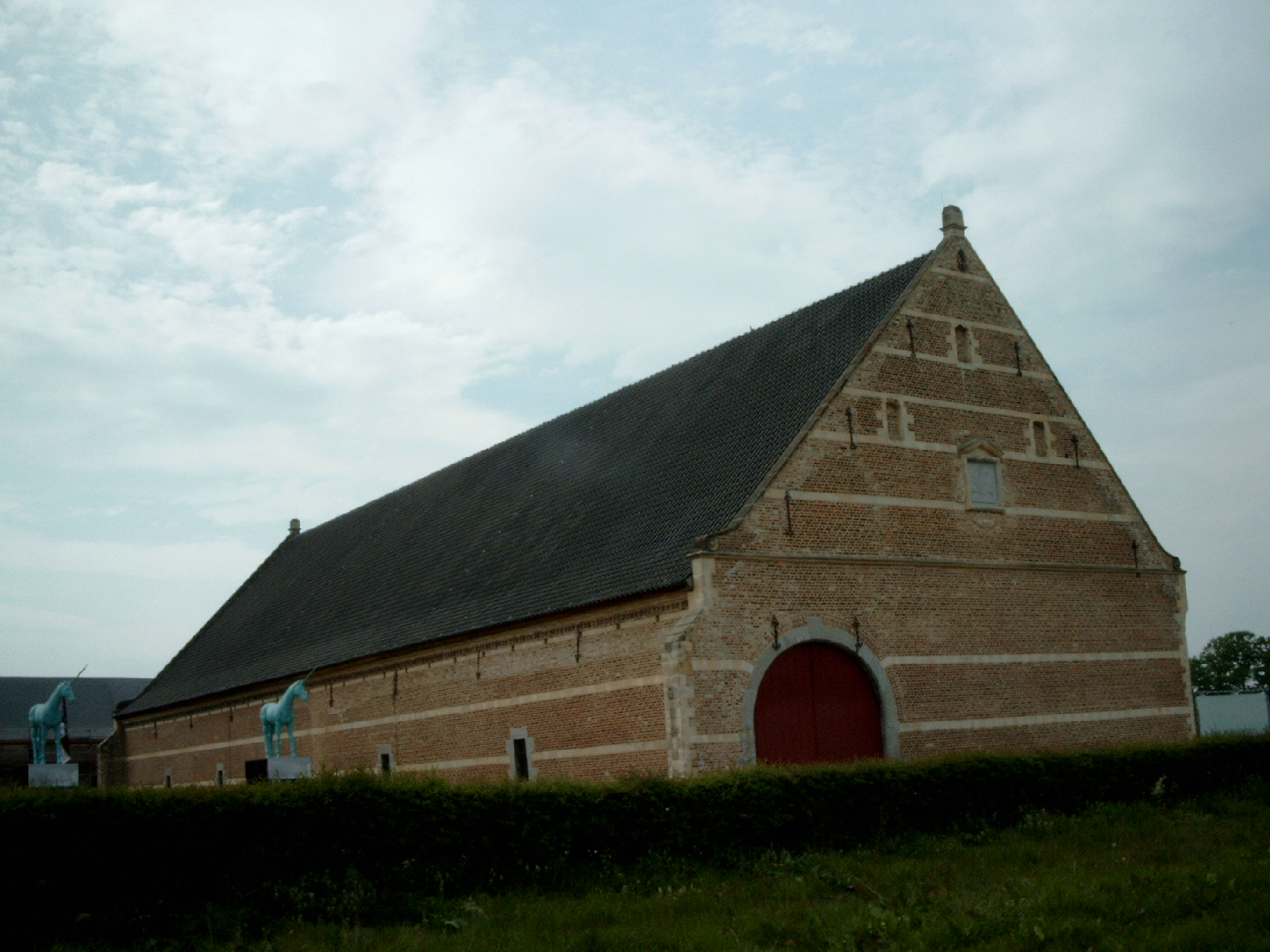
The restored tithe barn

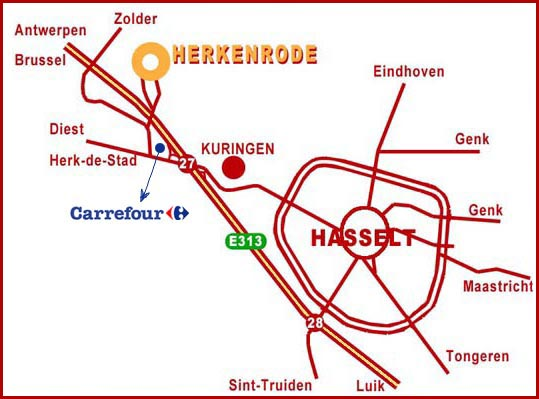
Map

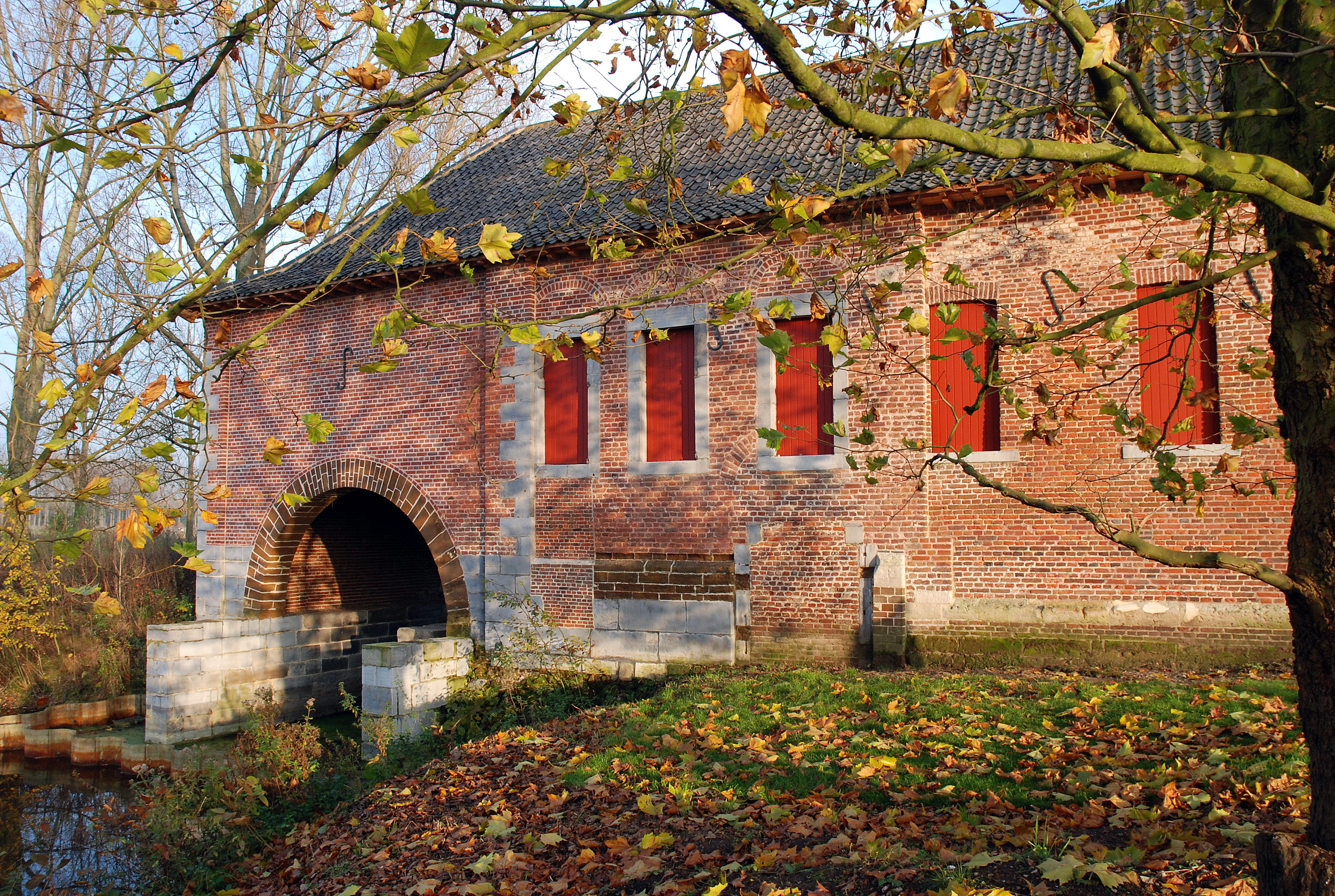
The mill house

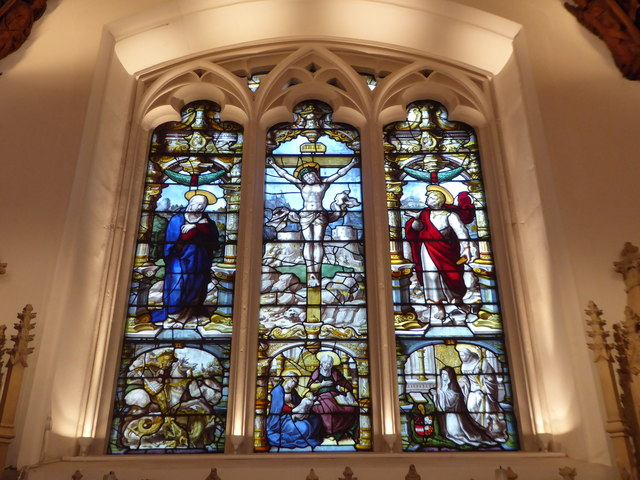
Stained glass from Herkenrode in the east window of the Church of St Giles, Ashtead, Surrey, England

== Abbesses of Herkenrode ==
- Ingeltrude I (1182–1205)
- Jutta I (1205–1237)
- Ingeltrude II (1237–1257)
- Jutta II (1257–1272)
- Margareta (1273-before 1281)
- Aleidis van Diest (1281-1302)
- Margareta van Stein (1303-1333)
- Agnes van Guigoven (1333-1337)
- Beatrix van Lobosch (1341-1354)
- Aleidis van Wanrode (1354-1365)
- Catharina van Kerkom (1365-1391)
- Catharina van Goetshoven (1395-1412)
- Aleidis van Rijkel (1414-1433)
- Elisabeth van Kerkom (1433-1442)
- Beatrix van Reckhoven (1442-1447)
- Catharina van Schoonbeek (1447-1456)
- Catharina van Pipenpoye (1456-1491)
- Gertrudis de Lechy (1491-1519)
- Mechtildis de Lechy (1520-1548)
- Aleidis de Lechy (1548-1561)
- Catharina van Goor (1561-1579)
- Albertina van Schwartsenberg (1579, for a few months only)
- Catharina van Gaver (1579-1585)
- Anna van Blockerien (1585-1620)
- Margareta de Berghes (1620-1637)
- Barbara de Hinnesdael (1637-1653)
- Anna Catharina de Lamboy (1653-1675)
- Claudia de Merode (1675-1702)
- Catharina van Mombeek (1702-1725)
- Gertrudis van Mettekoven (1725-1728)
- Barbara de Rivière d'Arschot (1728-1744)
- Anna de Croÿ (1744-1772)
- Augustina van Hamme (1772-1790)
- Josephine de Gondrecourt (1791-1796)

== See also ==
- Herkenrode Tripel, beer associated with the abbey
