= Adalbert I of Teck =

German nobleman

Adalbert I, Duke of Teck
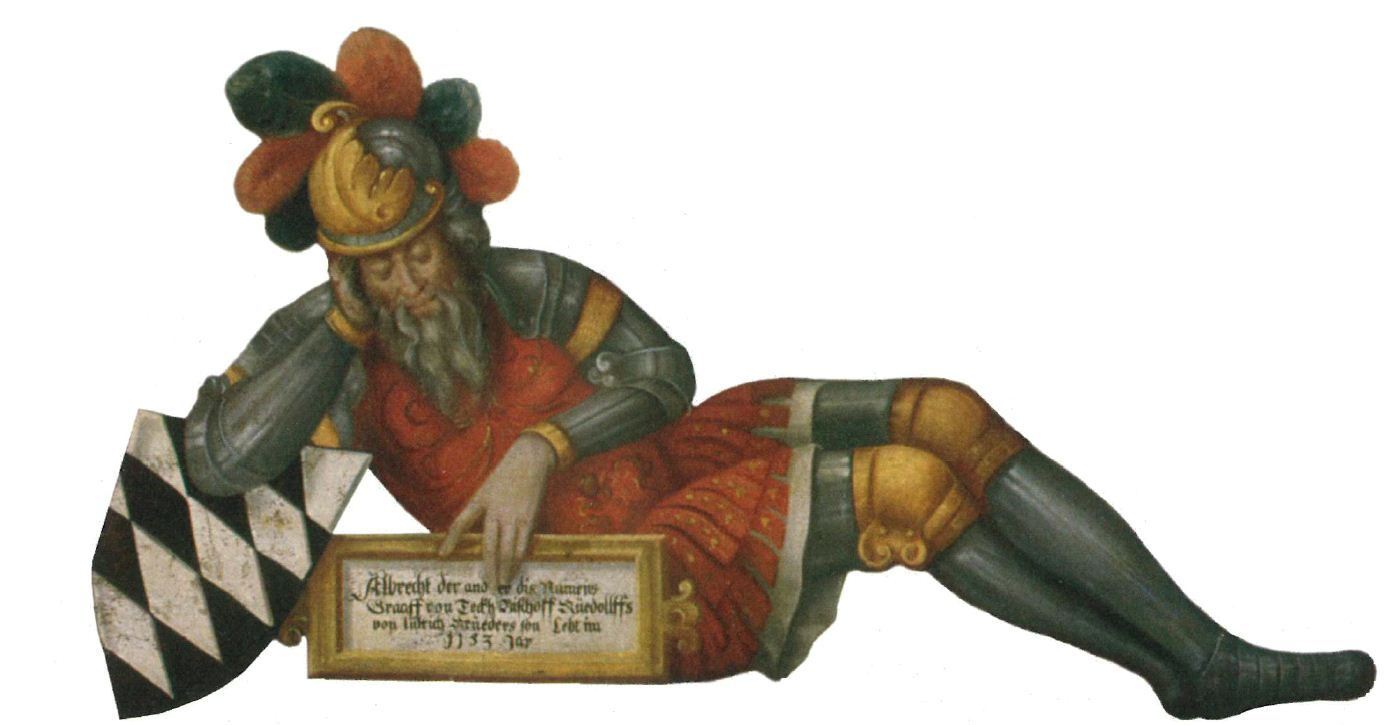
- Adalbert I of Teck - detail from a painting of the family tree of the Dukes of Teck, c. 1557
- Born: c. 1135
- Died: c. 1195
- Noble family: House of Zähringen
- Spouse: Adelaide
- Father: Conrad I, Duke of Zähringen
- Mother: Clementia of Luxembourg-Namur

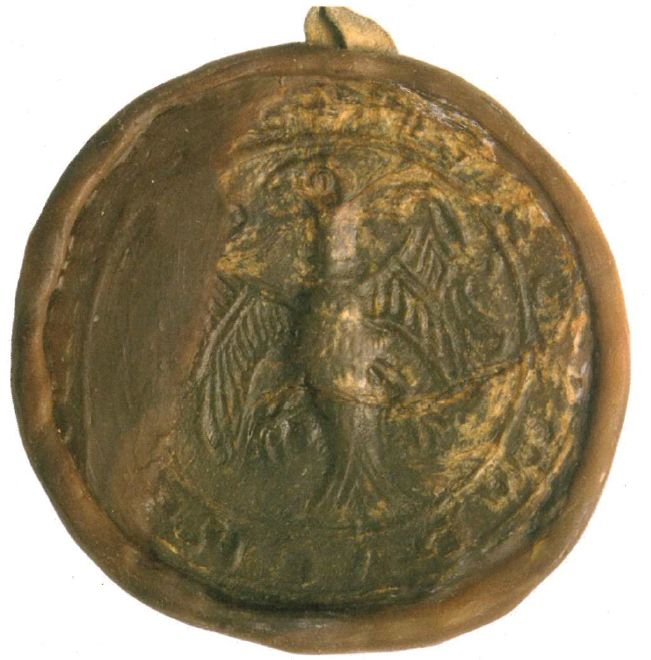
Eagle seal of Adalbert, Duke of Teck (c. 1190)

Adalbert I, Duke of Teck (c. 1135 – c. 1195) was a German nobleman. After the death of his brother Berthold IV, he styled himself Duke of Teck, and thus founded the elder line of the Dukes of Teck, which existed until 1439.

== Life ==
He was a son of Duke Conrad I of Zähringen and his wife Clementia of Luxembourg-Namur. He was named after his maternal uncle.

When his brother Berthold IV died in 1186, he inherited the family possessions in the foothills of the Swabian Jura, including Teck Castle and the office of Cup-bearer of the Abbey of St. Gall and the area on the upper Neckar that went with this office.

He is first mentioned as the son of Duke Conrad I in a document dated 1146; in 1152, he is named as a younger brother of Duke Berthold IV. In May 1189, he is first mentioned as Duke of Teck (Dux de Tecke) in a document of Emperor Henry VI.

A Duke "Adalbert of Teck" is also mentioned on 20 June 1192 in Schwäbisch Gmünd, on 4 (or 10) December 1193 in Gelnhausen and on 12 December 1193 at the court of Henry VI in Frankfurt, in a document of Count Egino IV of Urach about Bebenhausen Abbey, and by Bishop Diethelm of Constance in 1192. However, it is not clear whether these are references to Adalbert I or to his son, Adalbert II, Duke of Teck.

When his brother Hugh, Duke of Ullenburg died, Adalbert inherited his possessions in the Ortenau and the Breisgau. He may have already held the office of Treasurer of the Bishopric of Basel.

== Marriage and issue ==
Adalbert I was married to a noblewoman named Adelaide. Her parentage is unknown. They had the following children:

- Adalbert II, Duke of Teck (d. c. 1215/1219)
- (?) Agatha, married Diepold, Count of Lechsgemünd (d. after 1192)
- (?) Matilda

Adalbert I of Teck House of Zähringen Born: c. 1135 Died: c. 1195
New title	Duke of Teck; 1187-1195	Succeeded by Adalbert II
