= Rudolf of Zähringen =

German archbishop (12th century)

- Archbishop of Mainz
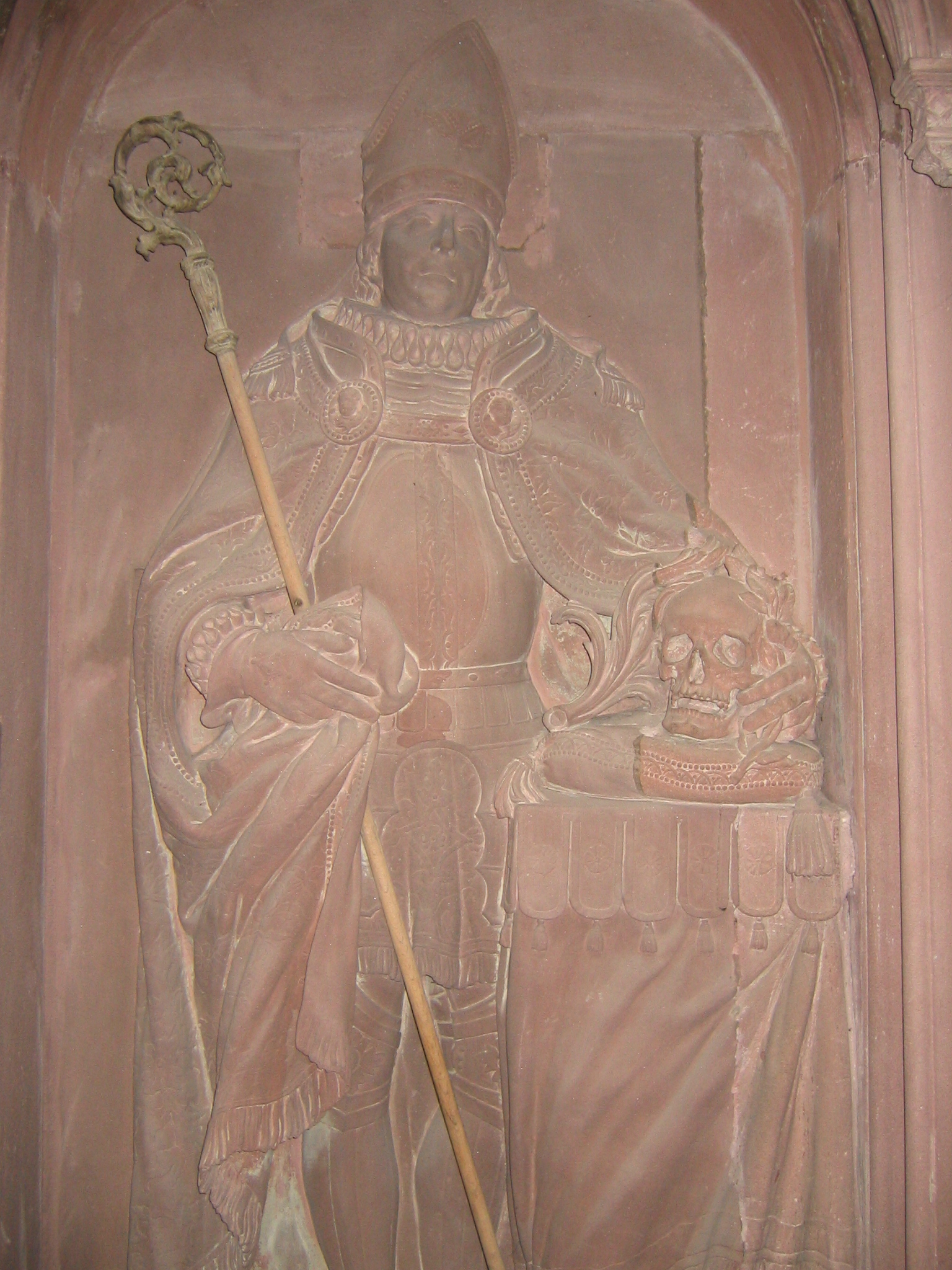
- Rudolf of Zähringen (relief by Franz Xaver Hauser 1793/5)
- Church: Catholic Church
- Diocese: Electorate of Mainz
- In office: 1160–1161

Personal details
- Born: c. 1135
- Died: 5 August 1191

Rudolf of Zähringen (also Rudolph, Ralph or Raoul) (c. 1135 – 5 August 1191) was the archbishop of Mainz from 1160 to 1161 and prince-bishop of Liège. He was the son of Conrad I of Zähringen and Clemence of Luxembourg-Namur.

After the death of Arnold of Selenhofen, the citizens of Mainz elected him archbishop, but the city had been placed under the interdict and the aristocracy and clergy had fled to Frankfurt am Main, where they elected Christian of Buch instead. Neither election was recognised by the emperor, Frederick Barbarossa. At the Synod of Lodi, both archbishops-elect were deposed and Rudolf was excommunicated.

In 1167, already released from his excommunication, he became bishop of Liège, a position almost as secularly important as that of Mainz. As bishop, he supported his brother, Berthold IV, Duke of Zähringen. On 11 May 1188, he arrived at the Siege of Acre with an army. He died on the way back from the Crusade, at Herdern. He was buried in the monastery of Saint Peter's there.

== Ancestry ==
Ancestors of Rudolf of Zähringen

16. Bezzelin von Villingen
8. Berthold II, Duke of Carinthia
17. Luitgard
4. Berthold II, Duke of Swabia
9. Richwara
2. Conrad I, Duke of Zähringen
20. Kuno of Rheinfelden
10. Rudolf of Rheinfelden
5. Agnes of Rheinfelden
22. Otto I, Count of Savoy
11. Adelaide of Savoy
23. Adelaide of Susa
1. Rudolf of Zähringen
24. Albert II, Count of Namur
12. Albert III, Count of Namur
25. Regilinda of Lower Lorraine
6. Godfrey I, Count of Namur
26. Bernard II, Duke of Saxony
13. Ida of Saxony
27. Eilika of Schweinfurt
3. Clementia of Namur
28. Giselbert of Luxembourg
14. Conrad I, Count of Luxembourg
7. Ermesinde of Luxembourg
30. William VII, Duke of Aquitaine
15. Clementia of Aquitaine
31. Ermesinde

Catholic Church titles
Preceded by Arnold	Archbishop of Mainz; 1160–1161 with Christian I	Succeeded by Conrad

== Sources ==
- Alexander Cartellieri (1907). "Rudolf (Bischof von Lüttich)" . Allgemeine Deutsche Biographie (in German). Vol. 53. Leipzig: Duncker & Humblot. pp. 584–585.
- Thomas Zotz (2005). "Rudolf". Neue Deutsche Biographie (in German). Vol. 22. Berlin: Duncker & Humblot. pp. 176–177. (full text online).
