= Berthold IV of Zähringen =

Rector of Burgundy (c. 1125–1186)

Berthold IV
- Duke of Zähringen
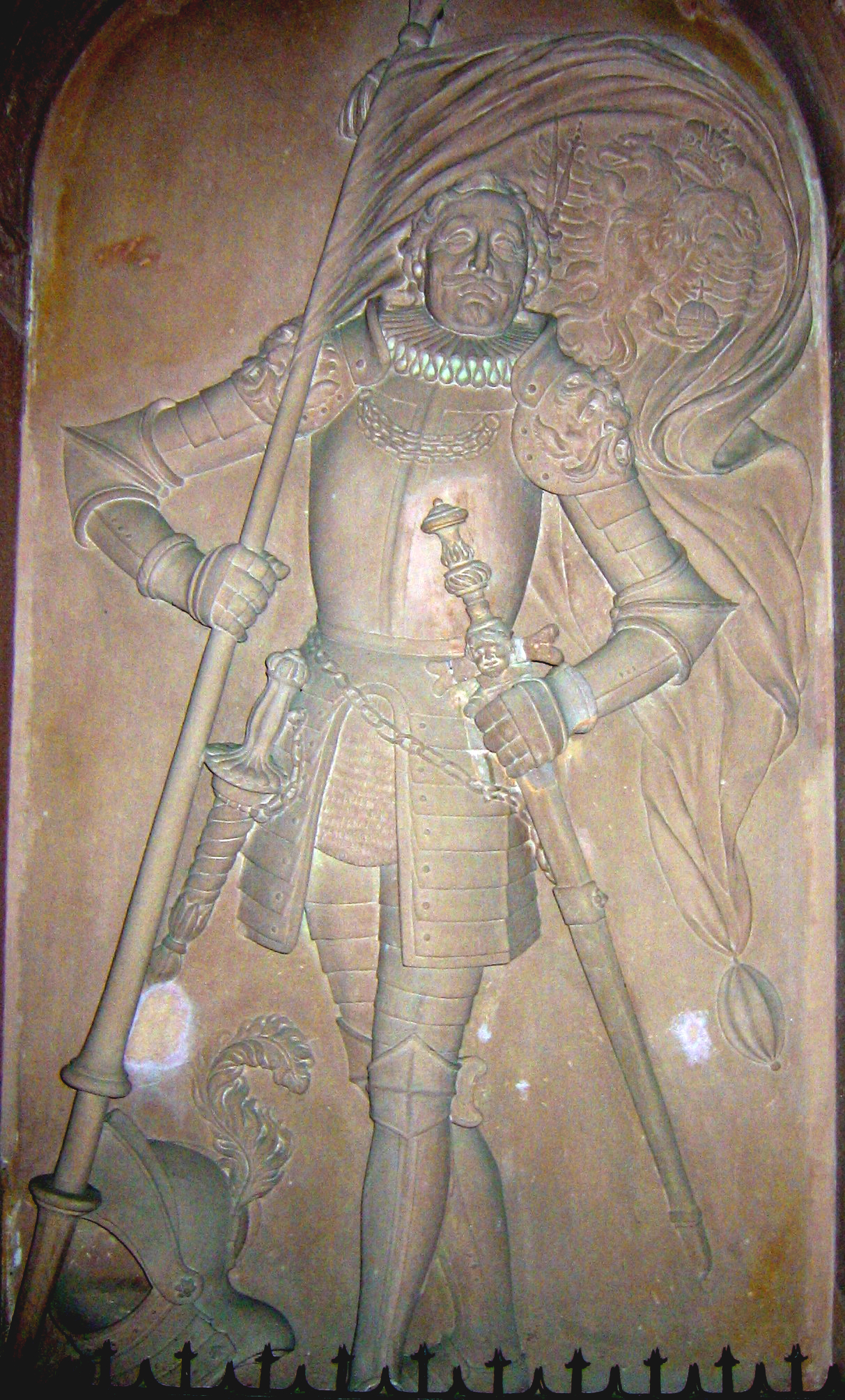
- Berthold IV, relief by Franz Xaver Hauser in the choir of Freiburg Minster (1793/5)
- Born: c. 1125
- Died: 8 December 1186
- Noble family: Zähringen
- Spouses: Heilwig of Frohburg; Ida, Countess of Boulogne
- Issue: Berthold V
- Father: Conrad I, Duke of Zähringen
- Mother: Clementia of Luxembourg-Namur

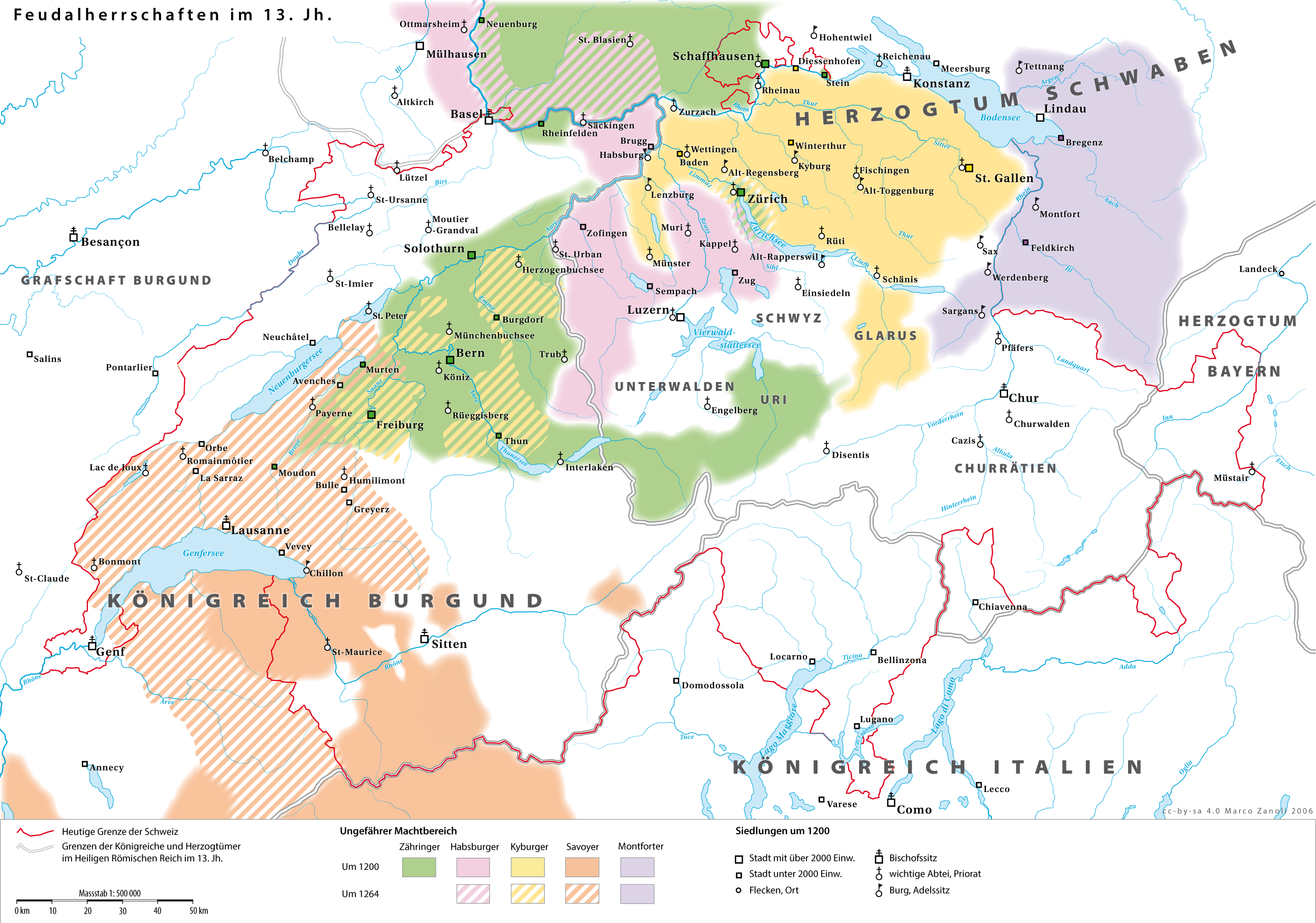
Territories in what is now Switzerland, c. 1200. The green parts were held by the Dukes of Zähringen

Berthold IV, Duke of Zähringen (c. 1125 – 8 December 1186) was a Duke of Zähringen and Rector of Burgundy. He was the son of Conrad I, Duke of Zähringen and Clementia of Luxembourg-Namur. He founded numerous cities, including Fribourg.

== Life ==
Berthold IV succeeded his father, Conrad I, in 1152 as Duke of Zähringen. Berthold also claimed the title of "Duke of Burgundy", which he had agreed upon with Barbarossa to receive after conquering the Cisjuran ("French") territories of Burgundy together and also helping him out in his Italian campaign in 1152. However, the conquest of Burgundy failed and in 1156 the Emperor Frederick Barbarossa instead married Beatrice, the daughter of the last Count of Burgundy of the House of Ivrea. This interfered with Berthold's claims and Berthold was given the title of Rector of Burgundy and was made overlord over the Transjuran ("Swiss") parts of Burgundy, Geneva, Lausanne and Sion.

The rivalry with Duke Frederick IV of neighbouring Swabia caused him to fight on the side of Welf VI in the Feud of Tübingen (1164–1166). In 1173, he became overlord of Zurich.

An entry in the necrology of the Abbey of Saint Peter in the Black Forest reads Berchtoldus 4. dux de Zaeringen, officium cum 5 candelis. Depositio Iohannis Tüfer abbatis: "Berthold IV, Duke of Zähringen donated 5 candles for the memory of John the Baptist".

== Marriages and issue ==
Berthold IV was married to Heilwig of Frohburg, with whom he had three children:

- Berthold V, the last Duke of Zähringen. After his death, the counts of Kyburg and Urach inherited the Zähringen possessions
- Agnes, married to Count Egino IV of Urach — According to the necrology of Tennenbach Abbey, she was the daughter of Berthold V
- Anna, married to Count Ulrich III of Kyburg. They were the maternal grandparents of king Rudolf I of Germany.

== Sources ==
- Gilbert of Mons (2005). Chronicle of Hainaut. Translated by Napran, Laura. The Boydell Press.
- Lyon, Jonathan R. (2013). Princely Brother and Sisters: The Sibling Bond in German Politics, 1100-1250. Cornell University Press.

Berthold IV of Zähringen House of Zähringen Born: c. 1125 Died: 8 December 1186
Preceded by Conrad I	Duke of Zähringen; 1152-1186	Succeeded by Berthold V
