= Rheinfelden =

Rheinfelden may refer to:

== Places ==
- Rheinfelden (Baden), a town in the county of Lörrach in Baden-Württemberg, Germany
- Rheinfelden (Aargau), a town in the canton of Aargau, Switzerland
- Rheinfelden District, a district in the Swiss canton of Aargau

== People ==
- Adelaide of Rheinfelden (1060s–1090), Queen Consort of Hungary
- Agnes of Rheinfelden (c. 1065-1111), daughter of King Rudolf of Rheinfelden
- Bertha of Rheinfelden (c. 1065–after 1128), countess of Kellmünz
- Berthold of Rheinfelden or Berthold I, Duke of Swabia (c. 1060-1099), Duke of Swabia
- Franz Konrad Joseph Truchsess von Rheinfelden (1737–1826), German nobleman
- John of Rheinfelden (c. 1340-unknown), Dominican friar and writer
- Rudolf of Rheinfelden (also Rudolf of Swabia) (c. 1025-1080), counter-king to Henry IV in the Holy Roman Empire

== See also ==
- Rheinsfelden, Zurich, Switzerland
- Reinfeld (disambiguation)
