= Battle on the Elster =

Middle ages battle

Coordinates: 51.1669°N 12.1522°E

- Part of the Saxon revolt of 1077–1088
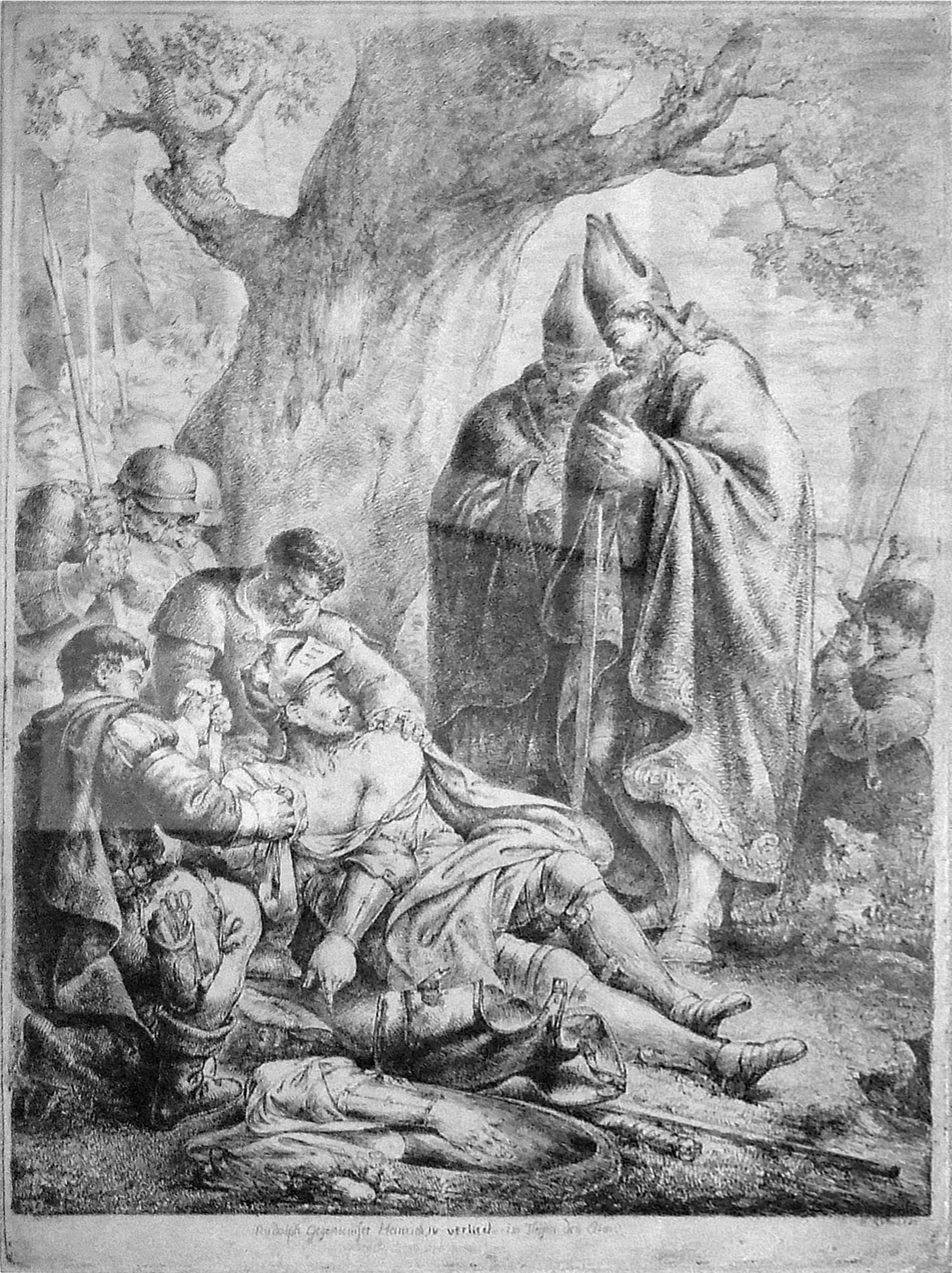
- Rudolph, Anti-Emperor of Henry IV, Loses His Arm in Combat, engraving by Bernhard Rode, 1781
Date	October 14, 1080
Location	near Hohenmölsen on the White Elster
Result	Military victory for Rudolf, Political victory for Henry

Belligerents
Henry IV of Germany	Rudolf of Swabia

Battle on the Elster (German: Schlacht bei Hohenmölsen) was the third and last battle between the Salian king Henry IV of Germany and anti-king Rudolf of Rheinfelden, fought on October 14, 1080 near Hohenmölsen on the White Elster river. Rudolf's forces were victorious; however, he was mortally wounded and succumbed to his injuries the next day.

== Background ==
In February 1076, Pope Gregory VII had excommunicated Henry over the Investiture Controversy. In turn, the rebellious German princes met at Trebur in October and resolved upon his deposition, if he would not be able to obtain the revocation of the ban within a year. By his Walk to Canossa in January 1077, the king received absolution; nevertheless, the princes elected Rudolf of Rheinfelden anti-king on March 15.

Henry placed Rudolf under imperial ban and marched against him. Their forces first met in the Battle of Mellrichstadt on 7 August 1078 and again in the Battle of Flarchheim on 27 January 1080. Both encounters remained inconclusive.

== Prelude ==
Henry marched through Thuringia trying to unite his forces from southern and western Germany with those of Duke Vratislaus II of Bohemia and Margrave Egbert II of Meissen. To do so Henry had to bypass Rudolf's Saxon allies. Henry successfully drew off the Saxons by feigning a move toward Goslar, while his main army approached Erfurt eastwards along Saxony's southern border. Henry plundered the city and proceeded to Naumburg, hoping to meet up with the other half of his forces on the Saale or Elster rivers.

Rudolf's army soon realized its mistake and pursued Henry. They caught his forces on the western bank of the Elster near Hohenmölsen. While Henry's Bavarian contingent may have joined the king, the contingents from Bohemia and Meissen were still on the far bank. Henry retreated to a swampy valley called Gruna.

== Battle ==
Rudolf decided to attack before Henry's reinforcement would arrive. The battle began with knights from both armies trading insults. Henry was initially protected from Rudolf's army by the swampy ground. Nearby was the bridge over the Elster to the town of Zeitz. The bridge was being held against Henry, probably by the townsmen. To meet up with his other forces, Henry would either have to force the bridge or build his own crossing.

Meanwhile, Rudolf wanted to prevent Henry's escape. The long pursuit had weakened the cavalry. Rudolf ordered the knights with tired horses to dismount and strengthen the infantry. The Saxon commander Otto of Nordheim led these forces on a direct assault across the swampy Gruna. Meanwhile, the remains of Rudolf's knights attempted to circle the swamp. While Henry and Rudolf's knights fought on the periphery of the swamp, Otto was able to force his way through Henry's screening force and broke into Henry's camp. Otto retained control of his force and prevented them from plundering the camp. Otto's force then fell on the remains of Henry's army engaged with the rest of Rudolf's forces.

Henry's army broke. Many of his warriors drowned in the Elster. The king was able to escape southwards, where he was brought to safety by the approaching Bohemian forces.

== Aftermath ==
Although a military defeat for Henry, Rudolf was fatally wounded when one of Henry's knights cut off his right hand and stabbed his belly with his sword. Rudolf died of his wounds the next day and his body was laid out in Merseburg Cathedral, where the severed hand is still kept. With Rudolf no longer a threat, the rebellion had lost its focus. Henry conquered and demolished the remaining fortresses of Rudolf's troops. He declared the loss of Rudolf's Schwurhand, a judgement of God, further weakening the support of the prince's rebellion.
