= Adelaide of Savoy, Duchess of Swabia =

Duchess consort of Swabia from 1062 to 1079

Adelaide of Savoy

Duchess consort of Swabia
- Tenure: 1062–1079
- Born: Adelaide c. 1050
- Died: c. 1079
- Burial: Monastery of St. Blasien
- Spouses: Guigues I of Albon (disputed); Rudolf of Rheinfelden
- Issue: Agnes of Rheinfelden; Adelaide of Rheinfelden; Bertha of Rheinfelden; Otto; Berthold of Rheinfelden (disputed)
- Father: Otto of Savoy
- Mother: Adelaide of Susa

Adelaide of Savoy (German: Adelheid von Turin; c.1050/2 – 1079), a member of the Burgundian House of Savoy, was Duchess of Swabia from about 1062 until 1079 by her marriage with Rudolf of Rheinfelden, who also was elected German anti-king in 1077.

== Biography ==
Adelaide's parents were Count Otto of Savoy and his wife Adelaide of Susa from the Arduinici noble family. Her maternal grandparents were Margrave Ulric Manfred II of Turin and Bertha of Milan. Adelaide was the younger sister of Bertha of Savoy, who was betrothed to the future king Henry IV of Germany in 1055.

According to the Europäische Stammtafeln genealogy, she first was married to Count Guigues I of Albon, though this assumption seems highly unlikely. Actually Adelaide, around 1060/62 and aged about ten, married the Swabian duke Rudolf of Rheinfelden.

In 1069 Rudolf attempted to repudiate Adelaide for an alleged affair with Count Werner of Habsburg. In 1071 Adelaide cleared herself of the accusation of adultery in the presence of Pope Alexander II. Rudolf was required to reconcile with Adelaide. At the same time, Henry IV attempted to repudiate her sister Bertha, also without success.

In 1077, an assembly of revolting German princes elected Rudolf anti-king. He was crowned by Archbishop Siegfried I of Mainz on March 26, with Adelaide as his consort. When the Great Saxon Revolt broke out, Adelaide remained in Swabia, defending her husband's lands, whilst Rudolf campaigned against Henry IV in Saxony.

Adelaide died during the Easter period of 1079, apart from her husband at Hohentwiel Castle. She was buried in the monastery of St. Blasien.

== Issue ==
With Rudolf, Adelaide had at least four children:

- Agnes of Rheinfelden, married Berthold II of Zähringen
- Adelaide of Rheinfelden, married King Ladislaus I of Hungary
- Bertha of Rheinfelden, Countess of Kellmünz, married Ulrich X, Count of Bregenz
- Otto (died young)
- Berthold of Rheinfelden (disputed)

== Sources ==
- E. Hlawitschka, ‘Zur Herkunft und zu den Seitenverwandten des Gegenkönigs Rudolf,’ in Die Salier und das Reich, I, pp. 175–220
- H. Bresslau, Jahrbücher des Deutschen Reichs unter Konrad II., 2 vols. (1884), online at: archive.org
- Charles William Previté-Orton, The Early History of the House of Savoy (1000-1233) (Cambridge, 1912), online at: archive.org
- Bernold of Constance, Chronicon, in Die Chroniken Bertholds von Reichenau und Bernolds von Konstanz 1054-1100, ed. I.S. Robinson, MGH SS rer Germ NS 14 (Hannover, 2003), pp. 383-540.
- G. Meyer von Knonau, Jahrbücher des Deutschen Reiches unter Heinrich IV und Heinrich V, 7 vols (Leipzig, 1890-1909).

Adelaide of Savoy, Duchess of Swabia House of Savoy Born: c. 1050 Died: 12 October 1079
Regnal titles
Preceded by Matilda of Germany	Duchess of Swabia c. 1062–1079	Succeeded by Agnes of Rheinfelden
