= Saxon revolt of 1077–1088 =

Civil war in the Holy Roman Empire

Saxon revolt
- Part of the Investiture Controversy
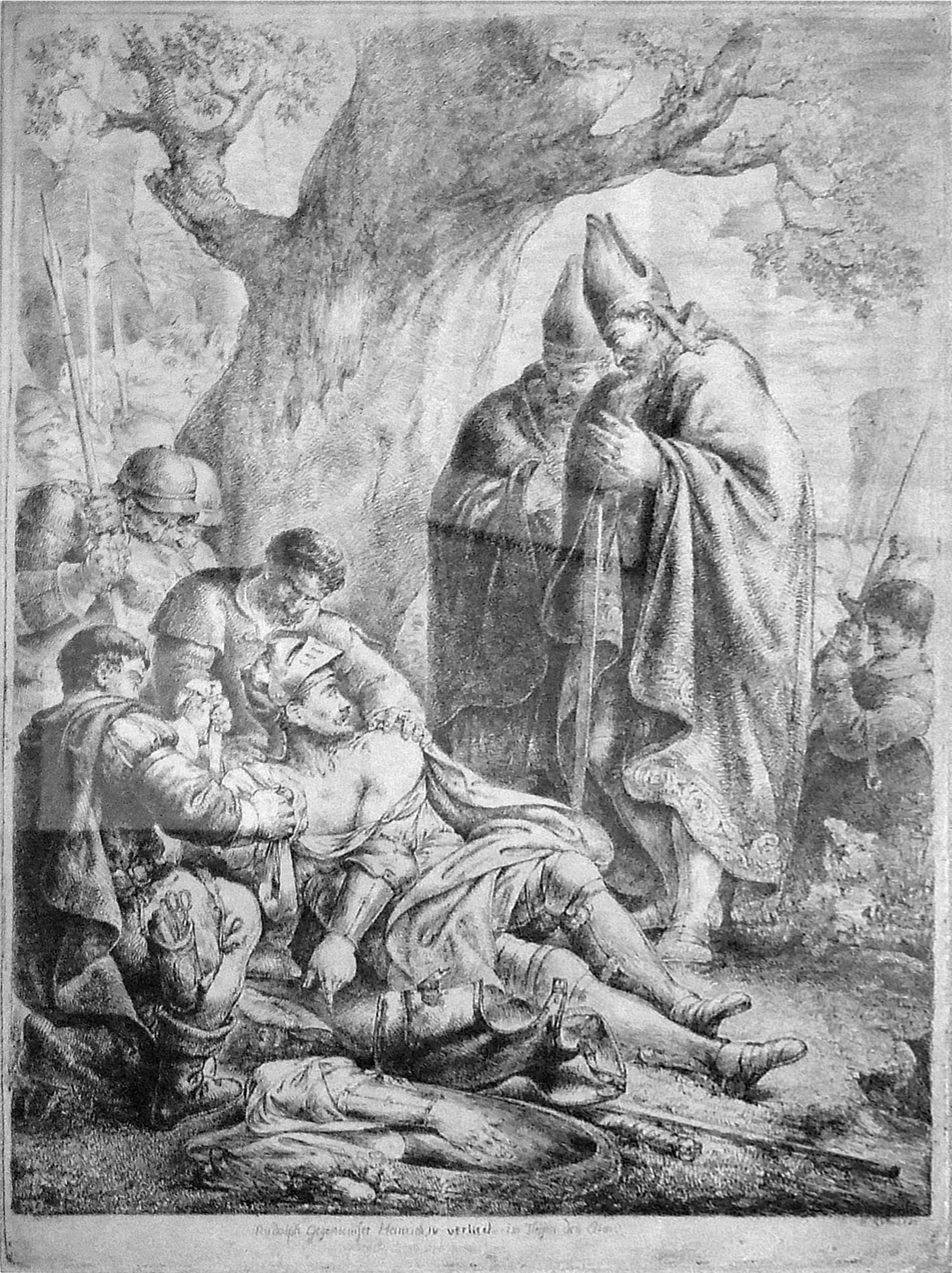
- Rudolph, Anti-Emperor of Henry IV, Loses His Arm in Combat, engraving by Bernhard Rode, 1781
Date	1077–1088
Location	Germany
Result	Henry IV's victory

Belligerents
Holy Roman Empire	German rebels; Duchy of Saxony; Duchy of Bavaria; County of Luxembourg

Commanders and leaders
Henry IV of Germany; Vratislaus II of Bohemia; Frederick I of Swabia; Godfrey of Bouillon; Henry of Laach	Rudolf of Rheinfeld (DOW); Hermann of Salm; Otto of Nordheim; Welf I of Bavaria; Egbert II of Meissen; Werner of Magdeburg †

The Saxon revolt was a civil war fought between 1077 and 1088, early in the history of the Holy Roman Empire. The revolt was led by a group of opportunistic German princes who elected as their figurehead the duke of Swabia, Rudolf of Rheinfeld, who became the anti-king. Rudolf was a two-way brother-in-law (Note: Rudolf's first wife, Matilda, was Henry's older sister; his second wife, Adelaide, was the sister of Henry's first wife, Bertha.) of the young King Henry IV of Germany, who had been crowned at the age of six and had taken the reins of power at age sixteen. The Great Revolt followed the Saxon Rebellion of 1073–75.

== Background ==
Rudolf of Rheinfeld had played power politics with King Henry IV several years earlier in his reign, and was demonstrably ruthless (kidnapping and forcing the marriage to Henry's sister) even without the support of the other princes of the Kingdom of Germany. The allied nobility were moved to take advantage of the momentary weakness of the king in a period when he was at odds and had been excommunicated by Pope Gregory VII over the issue of who was entitled to appoint whom, who was therefore subservient to whom, as well as a dispute over the king's desire to divorce from his wife, Bertha of Savoy.

== Rebels' Forchheim meeting ==
After meeting with a penitent Henry IV in the fall of 1076, the pope had removed the first excommunication of the impetuous and hot-headed 26-year-old monarch. However, during the same fall-winter season the organizers of the revolt by the nobility were arranging for all to meet in late winter to further their own ends against the interests of the young king. With the delays of news and events imposed by High Middle Ages travel, communications heralding the rapprochement were delayed enough that the decision was made to just go ahead and meet anyway. The diverse council of Saxon, Bavarian, and Carinthian princes met in the March 1077, about as soon as early spring travel conditions allowed, in Forchheim (Oberfranken), and despite the reconciliation between the pope and Henry decided to press forward with their desires to expand their own powers.

== The rebels and their policies ==
The group consisted of high-ranking secular rulers as well as churchmen—who had up until the very recent Investiture Controversy and crisis been appointed by the king (or emperor)—the new canon law reforms which set up the College of Cardinals had heavily involved Pope Gregory VII. The emperor was crowned by the pope, while the pope was appointed by the emperor. Henry's age of inheritance had been a flash point leading to much discussion and controversy spurring the reform. As the elected anti-king, Rudolf hoped to achieve the greater nobilities' backing by promising to respect the electoral concept of the monarchy (thus accepting a more limited and greater circumscribed set of powers as king of Germany) and the pope's backing by openly declaring his willingness to be subservient to the pope, as king of the Romans.

== Rudolf's crowning and first battles ==
Despite these difficulties, Henry's situation in Germany improved in the following years. When Rudolf was crowned at Mainz in May 1077 by one of the plotters, Siegfried I, Archbishop of Mainz, the population revolted and forced him, the archbishop, and other nobles to flee to Saxony. Positioned there, Rudolf was geographically and then militarily deprived of his territories (later he was also stripped of Swabia) by Henry. After the inconclusive Battle of Mellrichstadt (7 August 1077) and the defeat of Henry's forces in the Battle of Flarchheim (27 January 1080), Gregory VII, who had a personal grudge against Henry due to his intemperate language in earlier discourse, decided to flip-flop his decision supporting Henry to instead support the revolt and launched a second anathema (excommunication) against Henry in March 1080, thereby supporting the anti-king duke Rudolf. However, there was ample evidence that Gregory's actions were rooted in hate for Henry instead of theology and so had an unfavorable personal impact on the pope's reputation and authority, leading much of Germany to re-embrace Henry's cause.

== Decisive Battle of Elster ==
On 14 October 1080 the armies of the two rival kings met at the White Elster River during the Battle of Elster (Note: Godfrey was almost certainly present in support of Henry IV at the Battle of Elster in 1080 (sic 1085), when the forces of the anti-king Rudolf triumphed on the field only to see their victory nullified because Rudolf was killed) (Note: One of two brief accounts of the Battle of Volta Mantovana reports it occurred on the same day as the Battle of Elster (October 15, 1080) in which Rudolf was fatally wounded.) in the plain of Leipzig and Henry's forces again suffered a military defeat; however, the strategic outcome turned into a victory for Henry, as Rudolf was mortally wounded and died the next day at nearby Merseburg, leading to the rebellion against Henry losing much of its momentum.

== Henry's victory over the pope ==
Henry convoked a synod of the highest German clergy in Bamberg and Brixen (June 1080). Here Henry had Pope Gregory (whom he had dubbed "The False Monk") deposed and replaced him by appointing the primate of Ravenna, Guibert (now known as the Antipope Clement III), reasserting the Holy Roman emperors' traditional right to appoint the pope for his side of the Investiture Controversy—though who was in the right was unclear in the day—the emperor reacting to retain his traditional prerogatives against the new canon law appointing the pope via the College of Cardinals. For the next few years, the civil war shifted south of the Alps.

== Hermann, the new anti-king ==
While Henry campaigned there, the German aristocracy replaced their king Rudolf with the belated election of king Hermann of Salm (c. 1035 – 28 September 1088), also known as Herman of Luxembourg, as their new anti-king in August 1081, but he was fought successfully to a stalemate by Frederick I, Duke of Swabia (Frederick of Swabia)—Rudolf's Henry-appointed successor in Swabia who had married Henry's daughter Agnes. In 1084, Henry was crowned Holy Roman emperor by Antipope Clement III while Pope Gregory was in exile. This left the anti-king Hermann of Salm in an awkward position as partisans of Henry supported the deposition of Gregory and the elevation of Clement III.

Hermann's plan to gather an army on the banks of the Danube and march into Italy in support of the pope was dashed by the death of his main retainer, Otto of Nordheim. When Henry, now the crowned Holy Roman emperor, returned north and came into Saxony with an army in 1085, Hermann fled to Denmark. He returned, however, in alliance with Welf I, Duke of Bavaria, and defeated the emperor at the Battle of Pleichfeld in 1086 on the River Main, taking Würzburg.

== End of the revolt ==
Soon after his victory, however, Hermann tired of being a pawn in the hands of the grandees and retired to his familial estates. The Great Saxon Revolt civil war may have ended in 1088, for in 1089 Countess Matilda married Duke Welf II of Bavaria, but Duke Welf I only died in 1101.

== See also ==
- Concordat of Worms
- Investiture Controversy
