= Saint Blaise Abbey, Black Forest =

Abbey in St Blasien, Germany

Coordinates: 47°45′36″N 8°07′48″E

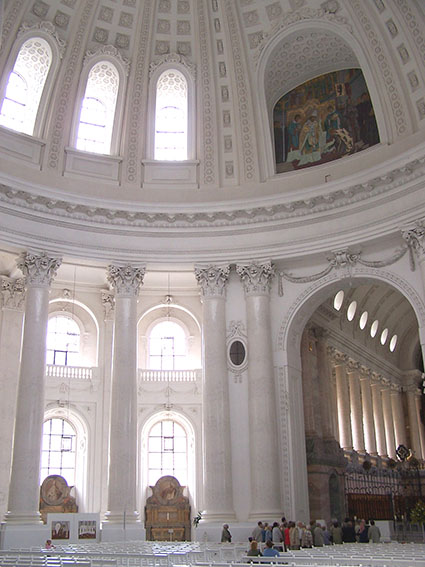
St. Blaise's Cathedral, the former abbey church

Saint Blaise's Abbey (German: Kloster Sankt Blasien) was a Benedictine monastery in the village of St. Blasien in the Black Forest in Baden-Württemberg, Germany.

== History ==
=== 9th–12th centuries ===
The early history of the abbey is obscure. Its predecessor in the 9th century is supposed to have been a cell of Rheinau Abbey, known as cella alba (the "white cell"), but the line of development between that and the confirmed existence of St Blaise's Abbey in the 11th century is unclear. At some point the new foundation would have had to become independent of Rheinau, in which process the shadowy Reginbert of Seldenbüren (died about 962), traditionally named as the founder, may have played some role. The first definite abbot of St Blaise's however was Werner I (1045?–1069). On 8 June 1065 the abbey received a grant of immunity from Emperor Henry IV, although it had connections to the family of the anti-king Rudolf of Rheinfelden.

Between 1070 and 1073 there seem to have been contacts between St. Blaise's and the active Cluniac abbey of Fruttuaria in Italy, which led to St. Blaise's following the Fruttuarian reforms, introducing lay-brothers or "conversi" and probably even the reformation of the abbey as a double monastery for both monks and nuns (the nuns are said to have re-settled to Berau Abbey by 1117).

Bernold of Constance (ca 1050–1100) in his histories counts St Blaise's alongside Hirsau Abbey as leading Swabian reform monasteries. Other religious houses were reformed by or founded as priories of St Blaise's: Muri Abbey (1082), Ochsenhausen Abbey (1093), Göttweig Abbey (1094), Stein am Rhein Abbey (before 1123) and Prüm Abbey (1132). It also had significant influence on the abbeys of Alpirsbach (1099), Ettenheimmünster (1124) and Sulzburg (ca 1125), and the priories of Weitenau (ca 1100), Bürgeln (before 1130) and Sitzenkirch (ca 1130). A list of prayer partnerships, drawn up about 1150, shows how extensive the connections were between St Blaise's and other religious communities.

During the course of the 12th century however the zeal of the monks cooled, as their attention became increasingly focussed on the acquisition, management and exploitation of their substantial estates, which by the 15th century extended across the whole of the Black Forest and included not only the abbey's priories named above, but also the nunnery at Gutnau and the livings of Niederrotweil, Schluchsee, Wettelbrunn, Achdorf, Hochemmingen, Todtnau, Efringen, Schönau, Wangen, Plochingen, Nassenbeuren and many others.

=== 13th–17th centuries ===
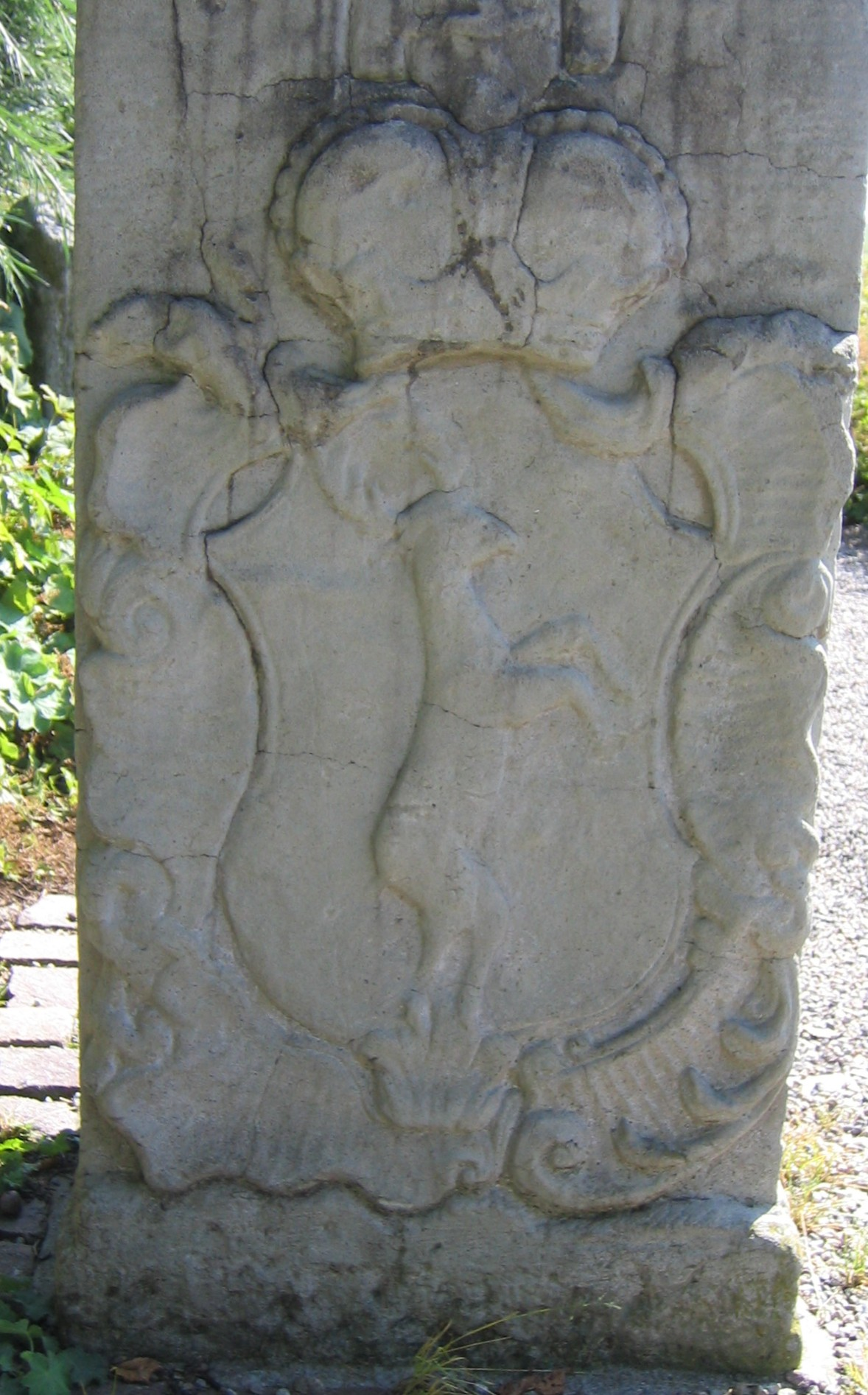
Boundary stone, Bonndorf (1767)

The original Vogtei (protective lordship) of the Bishops of Basle was shaken off quite early: a charter of the Emperor Henry V dated 8 January 1125 confirms that the abbey possessed imperial protection and free election of their Vogt. Nevertheless, the office afterwards became a possession of the Zähringer, and after their extinction in 1218, was held at imperial will and gift under the Emperor Frederick II. While this may well have preserved a certain bond with the Emperor, there seems to have been no question of St Blaise's having the status of a "Reichskloster".

From the mid-13th century the Vögte (protective lordship) were Habsburg which this drew St. Blaise's, like the whole southern part of the Black Forest, increasingly into the Austrian sphere of influence. The ties to the Empire remained, however: the abbey was named between 1422 and 1521 in the lists of imperial territories and the Swabian Circle tried in vain in 1549 to claim St Blaise's as an imperial abbey. The four imperial lordships which St Blaise's had started to acquire by the end of the 13th century — Blumegg, Bettmaringen, Gutenburg and Berauer Berg — in fact formed the nucleus of the imperially immediate lordship of Bonndorf, finally constituted in 1609 as a St. Blaise's territory with the acquisition of Bonndorf, from which the Prince-Abbots derived their status in the Holy Roman Empire.

=== 17th century – present ===
The abbey was dissolved in the course of secularisation in 1806 and the monastic premises were thereupon used as one of the earliest mechanised factories in Germany. The monks however, under the last Prince-Abbot Dr Berthold Rottler, found their way to St. Paul's Abbey in the Lavanttal in Austria, where they settled in 1809.

From 1934, the remaining buildings have been occupied by the well-known Jesuit college, the Kolleg St. Blasien.

== St Blaise's "Cathedral" ==
The abbey church burnt down in 1768, and was rebuilt as a Neoclassical round church by the architect Pierre Michel d'Ixnard, with an enormous dome 46 metres across and 63 metres high (the third-largest in Europe north of the Alps), during the years up to 1781 under the Prince-Abbot Martin Gerbert. It was consecrated in 1784.

It remains as the Dom St Blasius, or "St Blaise's Cathedral" (so called because of its size and magnificence, not because it is a cathedral in any ecclesiastical or administrative sense). Dom properly denotes or means an important church (as the main church of a town or a city), not a cathedral (seat of a bishop), Kathedrale in German. The effects of another catastrophic fire in 1874 were only finally remedied in the 1980s.

== Gallery ==
Sankt Blasien

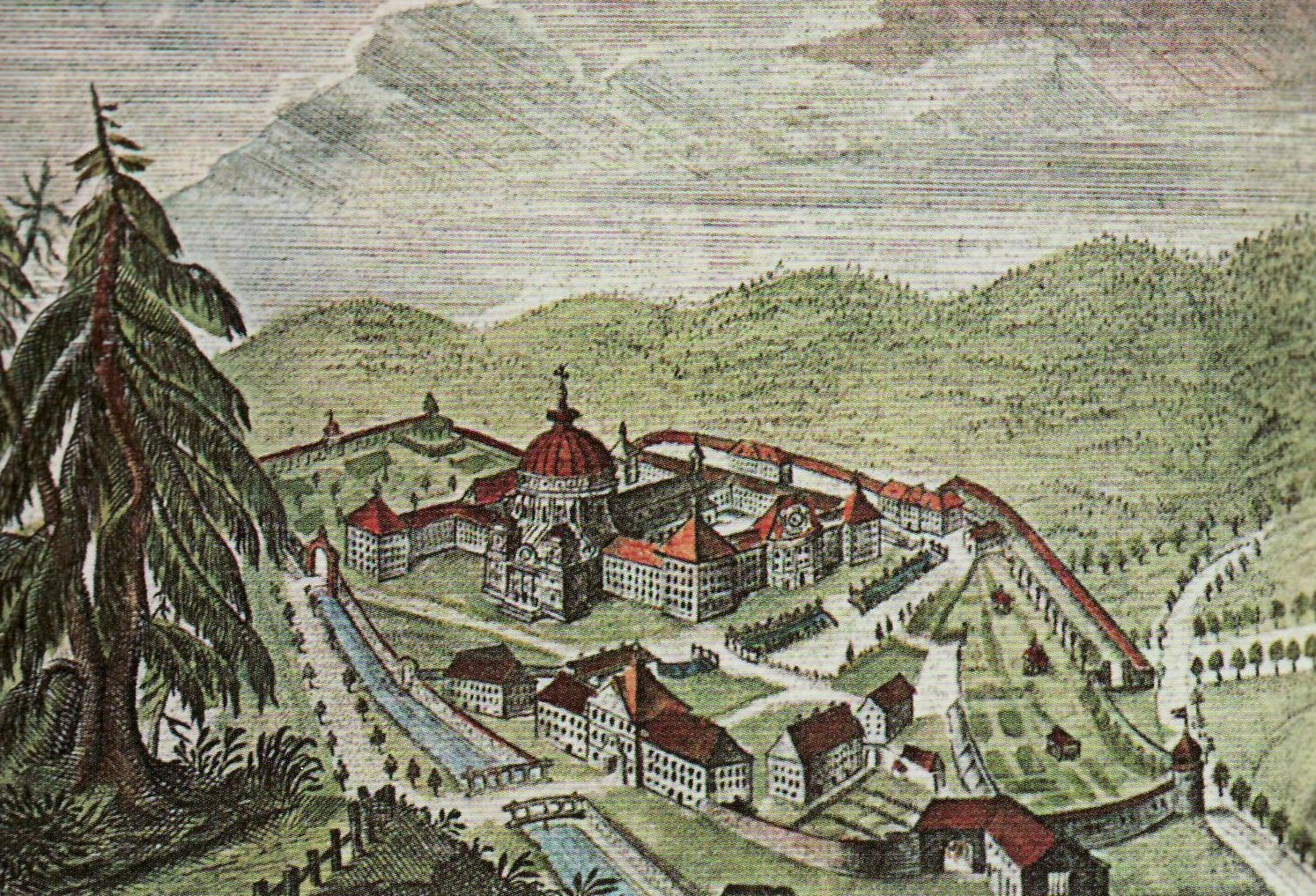
Painting of the Abbey, 1783

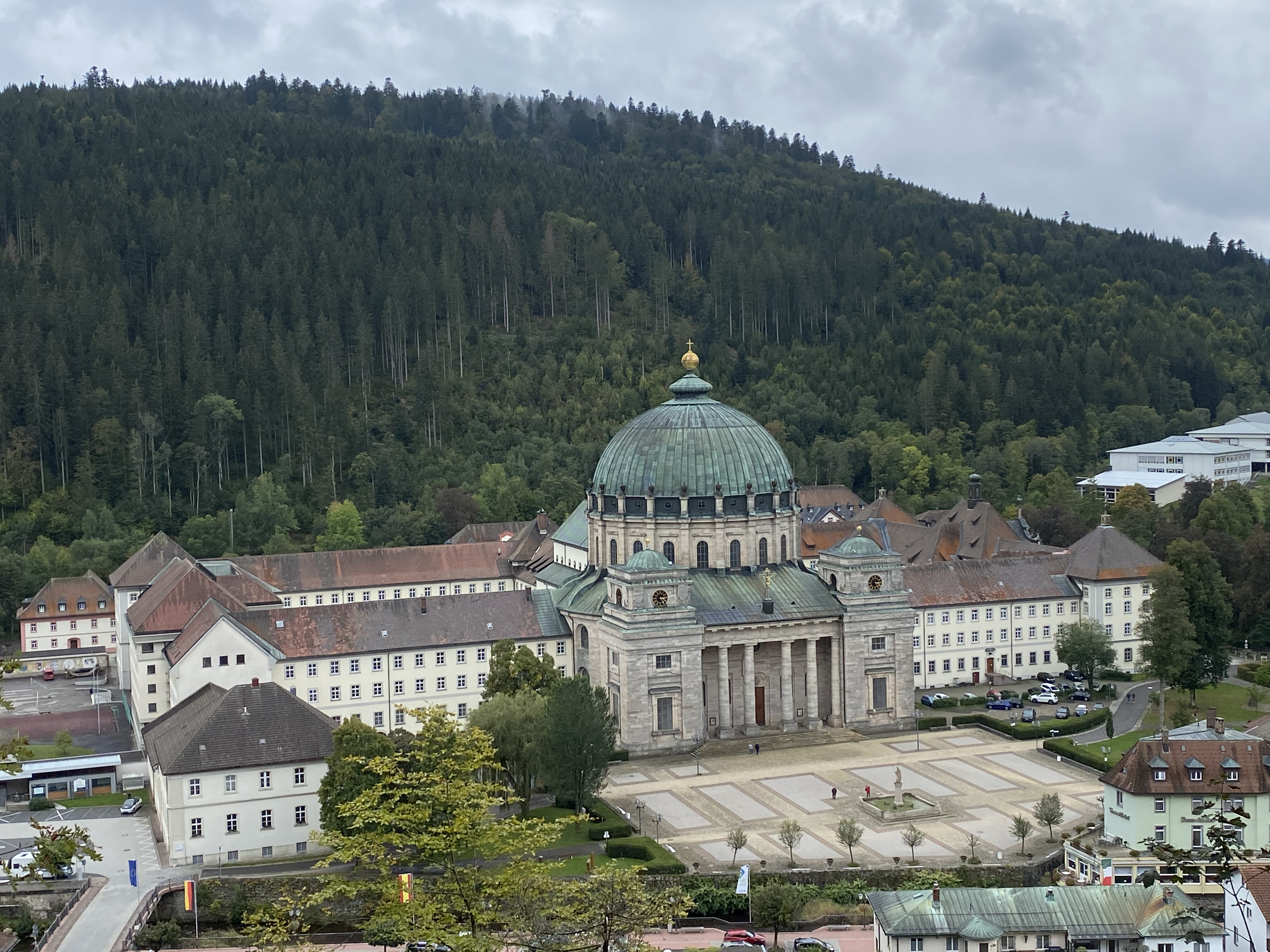
St Blaise Abbey

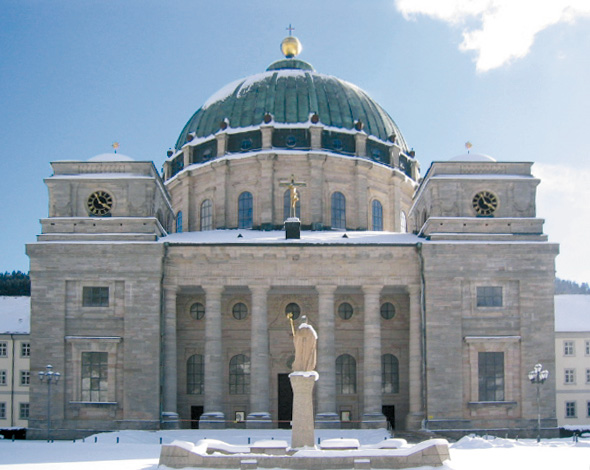
Front of the Abbey

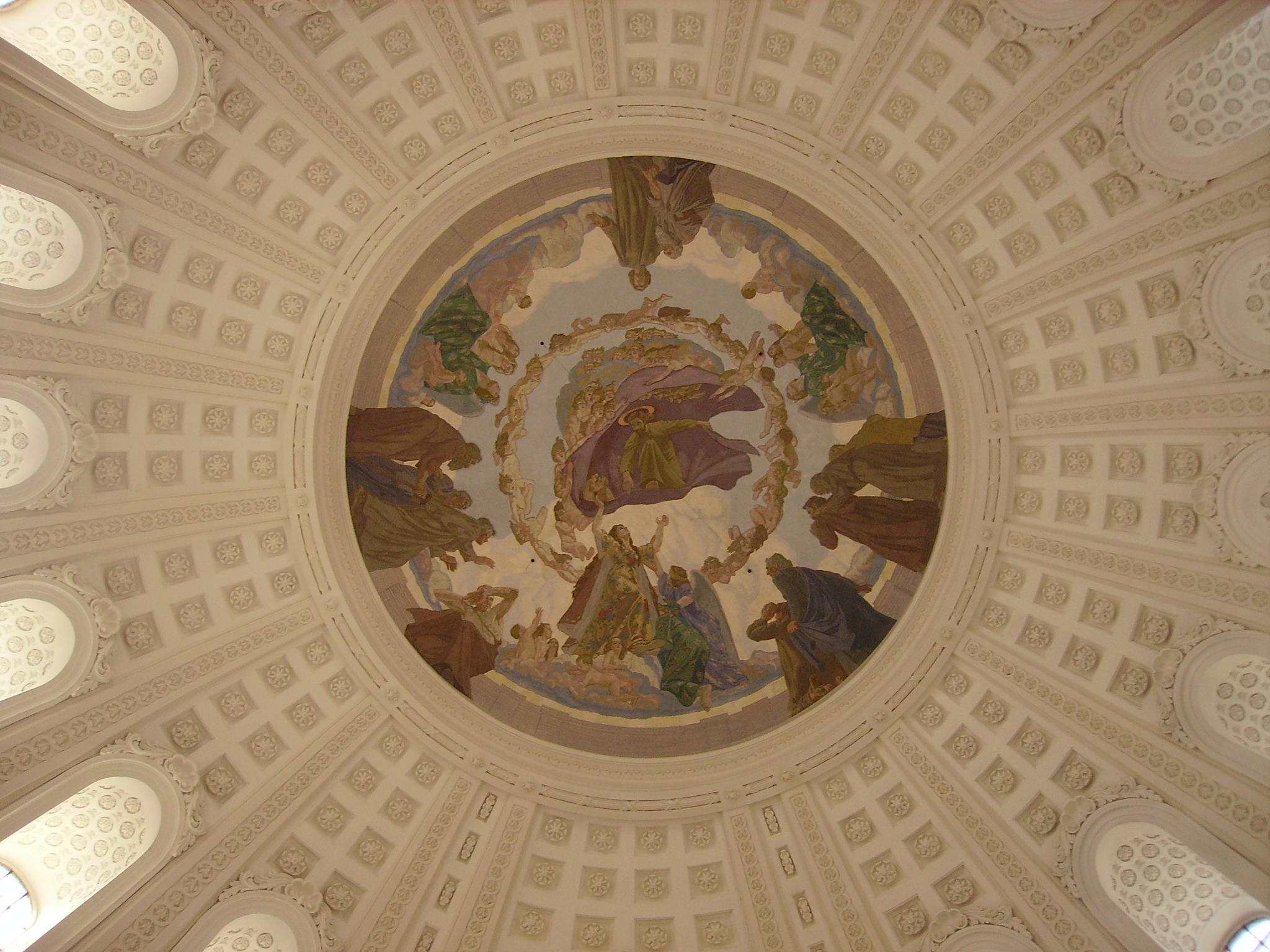
The Abbey Dome

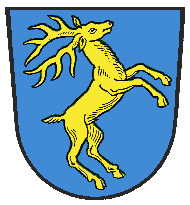
The arms of the Abbey

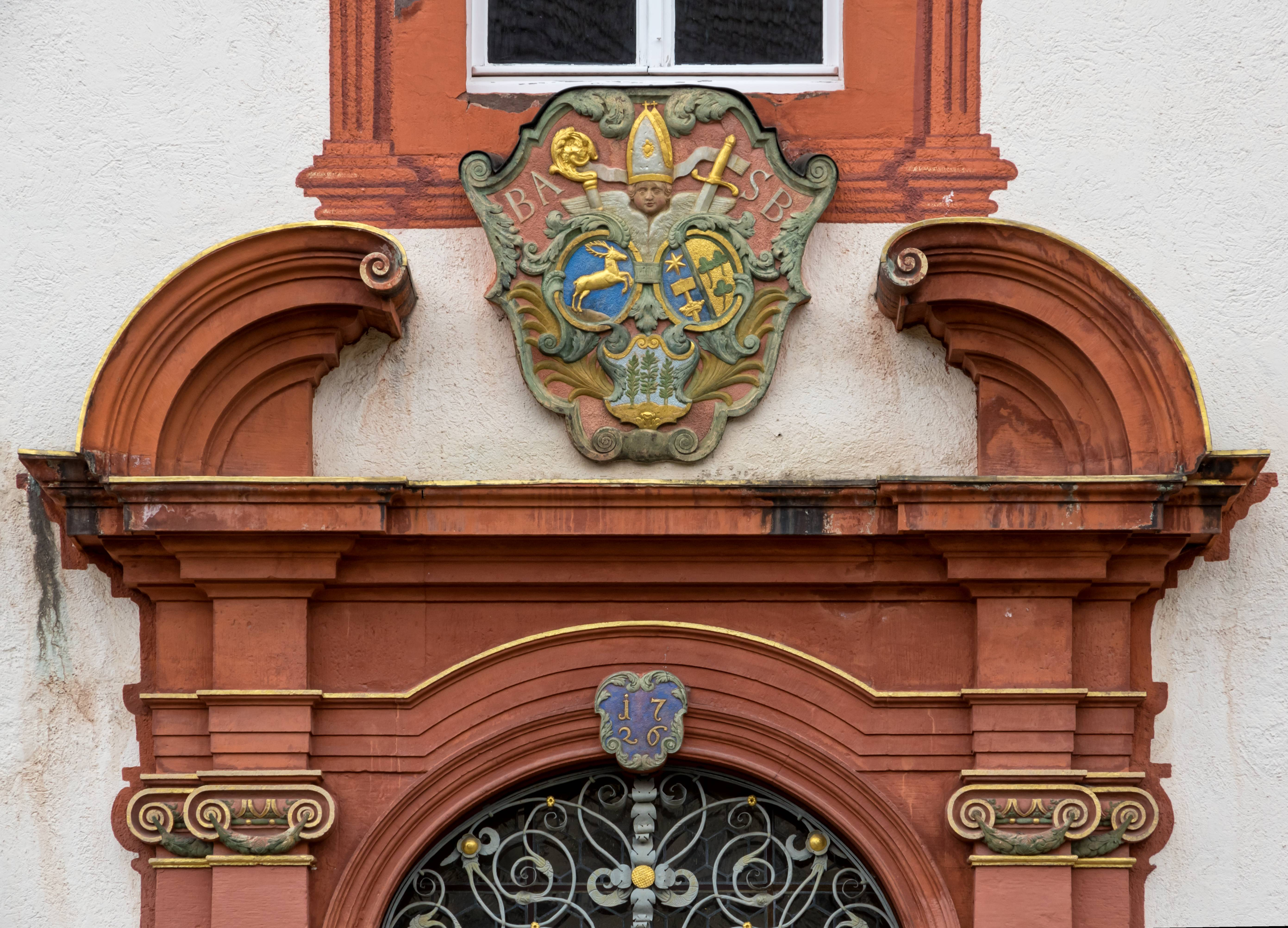
The arms of Blasius III Bender with those of the abbey on the gatehouse at German: de:Schloss Bonndorf

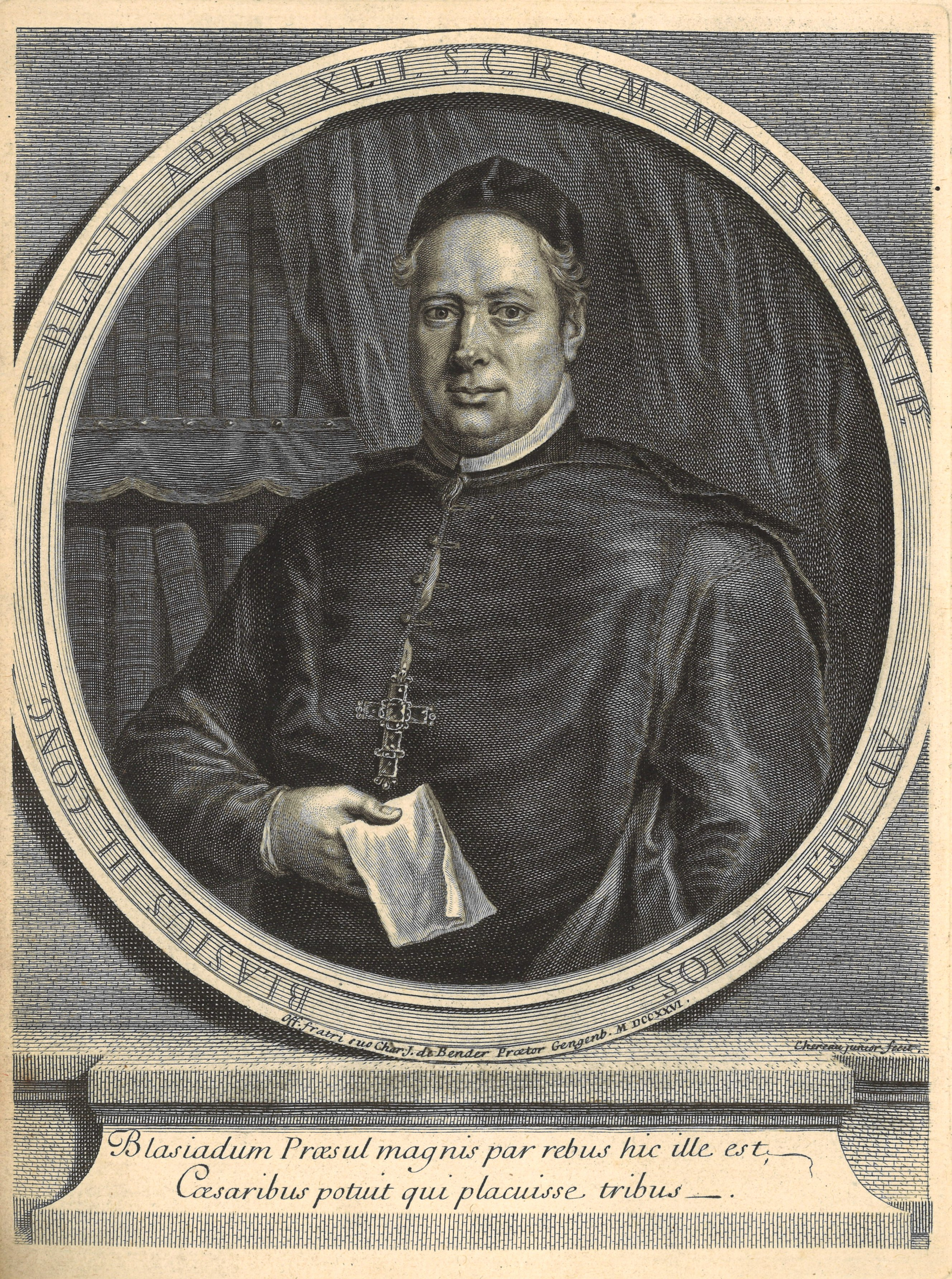
Blasius III Bender (1672-1727; abbot 1720–27)

== Abbots of St. Blaise’s in the Black Forest ==
- Beringer von Hohenschwanden (945-974)
- Ifo (974-983)
- Siegfried (983-1021)
- Bernard (1021–1045)
- Werner I (1045–1069)
- Giselbert (1068–1086)
- Otto I (1086–1108)
- Rustenus (1108–1125)
- Berthold I (1125–1141)
- Gunther of Andlau (1141–1170?)
- Werner II of Küssaberg (1170–1178)
- Theodebert of Bussnang (1178–1186)
- Manegold of Hallwil (1186–1204)
- Hermann I of Messkirch (1204–1222)
- Otto II (1222–1223)
- Hermann II (1223–1237)
- Heinrich I (1237–1240)
- Arnold I (1240–1247)
- Arnold II (1247–1276)
- Heinrich II of Stadion (1276–1294)
- Berthold II (1294–1308)
- Heinrich III (1308–1314)
- Ulrich (1314–1334)
- Petrus I of Thayingen (1334–1348)
- Heinrich IV of Eschenz (1348–1391)
- Konrad (1391)
- Johannes I Kreutz (1391–1413)
- Johannes II Duttlinger (1413–1429)
- Nikolaus Stocker (1429–1460)
- Petrus II Bösch (1460–1461)
- Christopher of Greuth (1461–1482)
- Eberhard von Reischach (1482–1491)
- Blasius I Wambach (1491–1493)
- Georg (Buob?) of Horb (1493–1519) Buob
- Johannes III Spielmann (1519–1532)
- Gallus Haas (1532–1540)
- Johannes IV Wagner (1540–1541)
- Caspar I Müller von Schöneck (1541–1571)
- Caspar II Thomae (1571–1596)
- Martin I Meister (1596–1625)
- Blasius II Münster (1625–1638)
- Franz I Chullots (1638–1664)
- Otto III Kübler (1664–1672)
- Romanus Vogler (1672–1695)
- Augustin Simon Eusebius Finck (1695–1720)
- Blasius III Bender (1720–1727)
- Franz II Schächtelin (1727–1747)
- Coelestin Vogler (1747–1749)
- Meinrad Troger (1749–1764)
- Martin II Gerbert (1764–1793)
- Moritz Ribbele (1793–1801)
- Berthold III Rottler (1801–1806)

== Burials ==
- Adelaide of Savoy, Duchess of Swabia
- Berthold I, Duke of Swabia

== See also ==
- 18th-century Western domes

== Sources ==
- Braun, J. W. (ed.), 2003. Urkundenbuch des Klosters Sankt Blasien im Schwarzwald. Von den Anfängen bis zum Jahr 1299; Teil I: Edition; Teil II: Einführung, Verzeichnisse, Register (= Veröffentlichungen der Kommission für Geschichtliche Landeskunde in Baden-Württemberg: Reihe A, Quellen; Band 23), Stuttgart. ISBN 3-17-017985-3
- Buhlmann, M., 2004. : Benediktinisches Mönchtum im mittelalterlichen Schwarzwald. Ein Lexikon. Vortrag beim Schwarzwaldverein St. Georgen e.V., St. Georgen im Schwarzwald, 10. November 2004, Teil 2: N-Z (= Vertex Alemanniae, H.10/2), pp. 76ff. St. Georgen.
- Ott, H., 1963. Studien zur Geschichte des Klosters St. Blasien im hohen und späten Mittelalter (= Veröffentlichungen der Kommission für geschichtliche Landeskunde in Baden-Württemberg; Reihe B, Band 27). Stuttgart.
- Ott, H., 1965. Die Vogtei über das Kloster St. Blasien seit dem Aussterben der Zähringer bis zum Übergang an das Haus Habsburg, in: Zeitschrift für die Geschichte des Oberrheins, Band 113 (NF 74), pp. 30–44.
- Ott, H., 1969. Die Klostergrundherrschaft St. Blasien im Mittelalter. Beiträge zur Besitzgeschichte (= Arbeiten zum Historischen Atlas von Südwestdeutschland, Bd.4). Stuttgart.
- Quarthal, F. (ed.), 1987. Germania Benedictina, Bd.5: Die Benediktinerklöster in Baden-Württemberg, 2nd ed., pp. 146–160. St. Ottilien. ISBN 3-88096-605-2
