= Abbey of Saint Peter in the Black Forest =

Monastery in Germany

Coordinates: 48°01′00″N 8°01′57″E

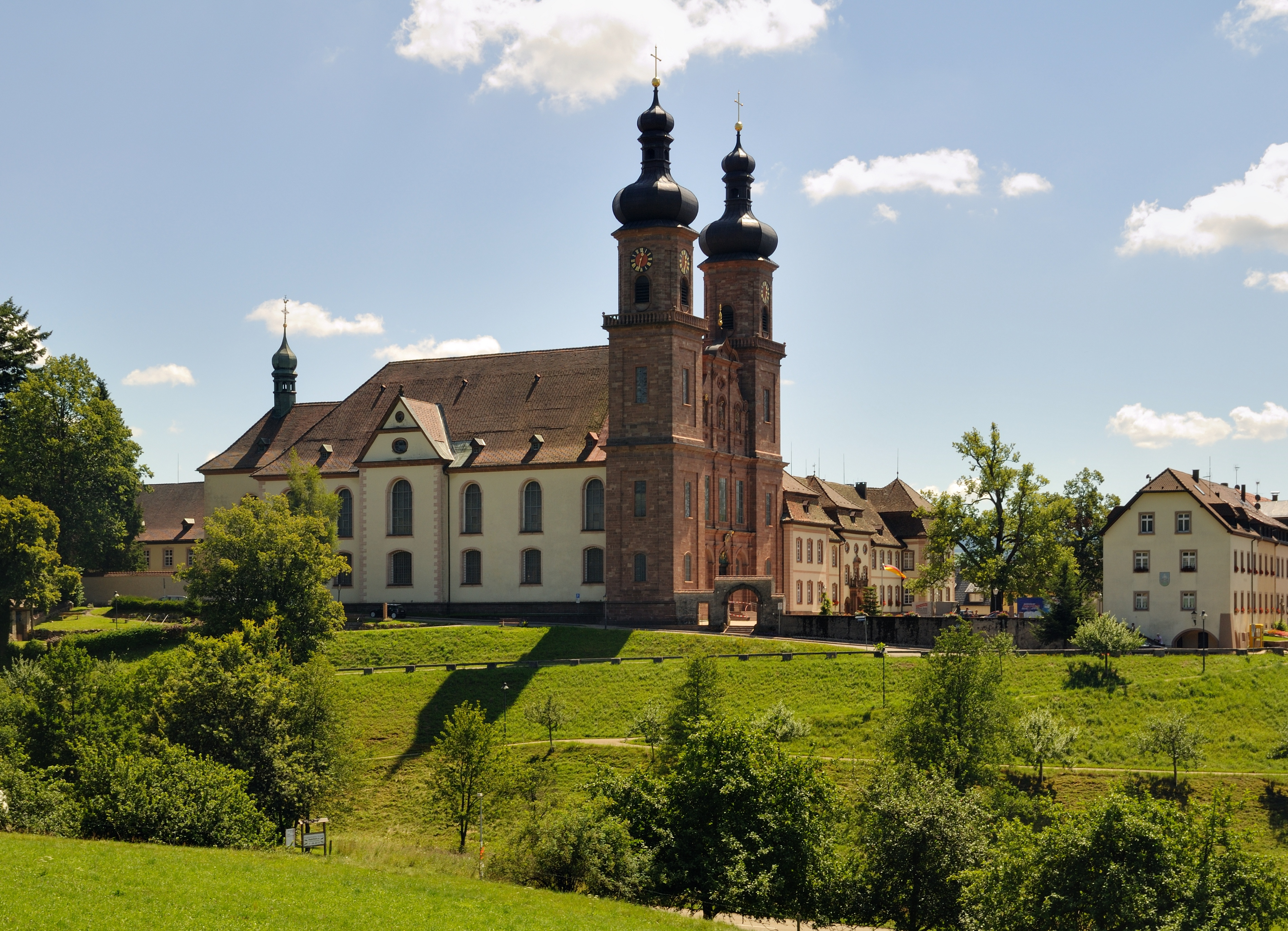
- Interactive map of Abbey of Saint Peter in the Black Forest

Monastery information
- Order: Benedictine

Site
- Location: St. Peter im Schwarzwald

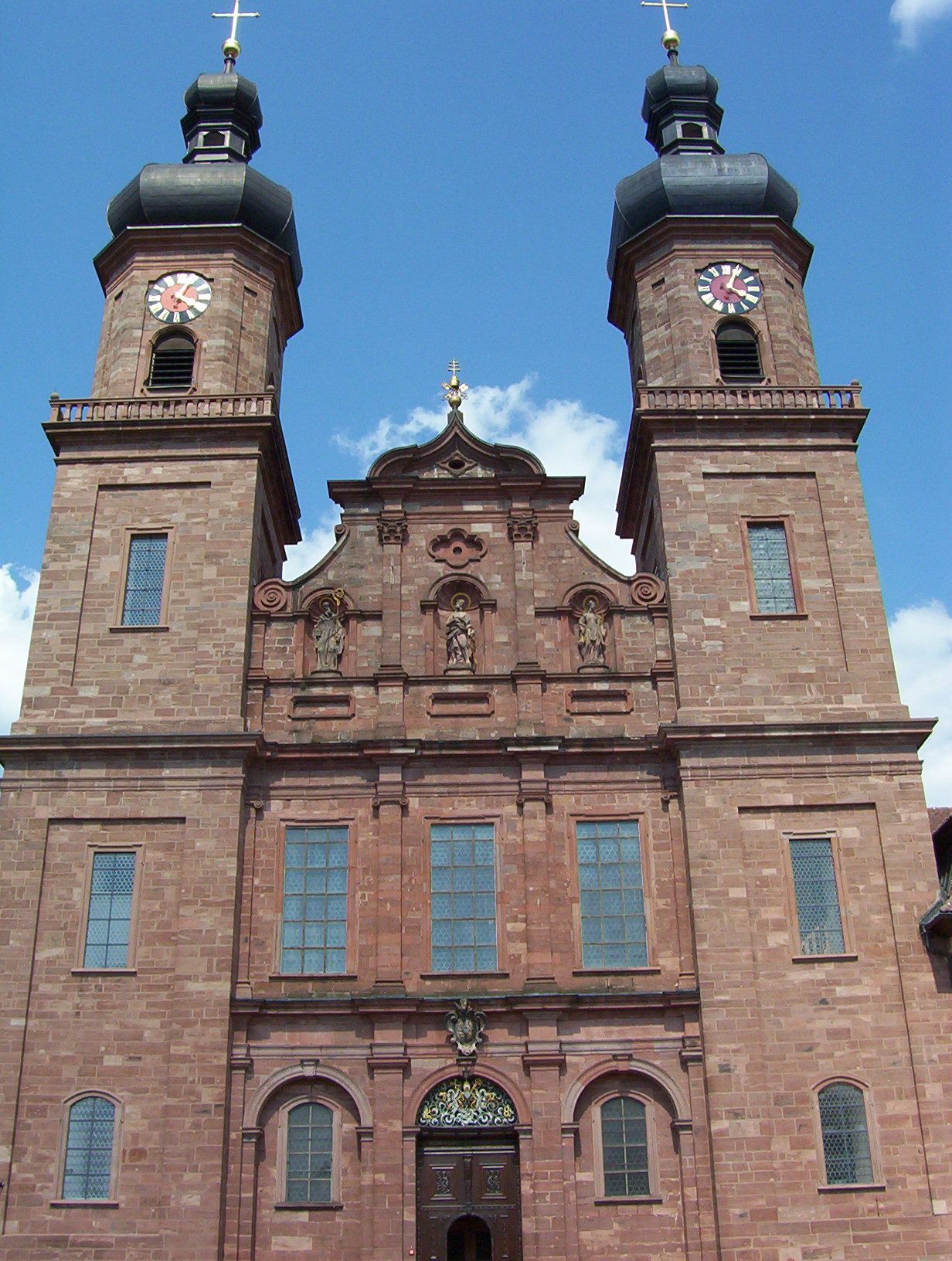
Abbey church

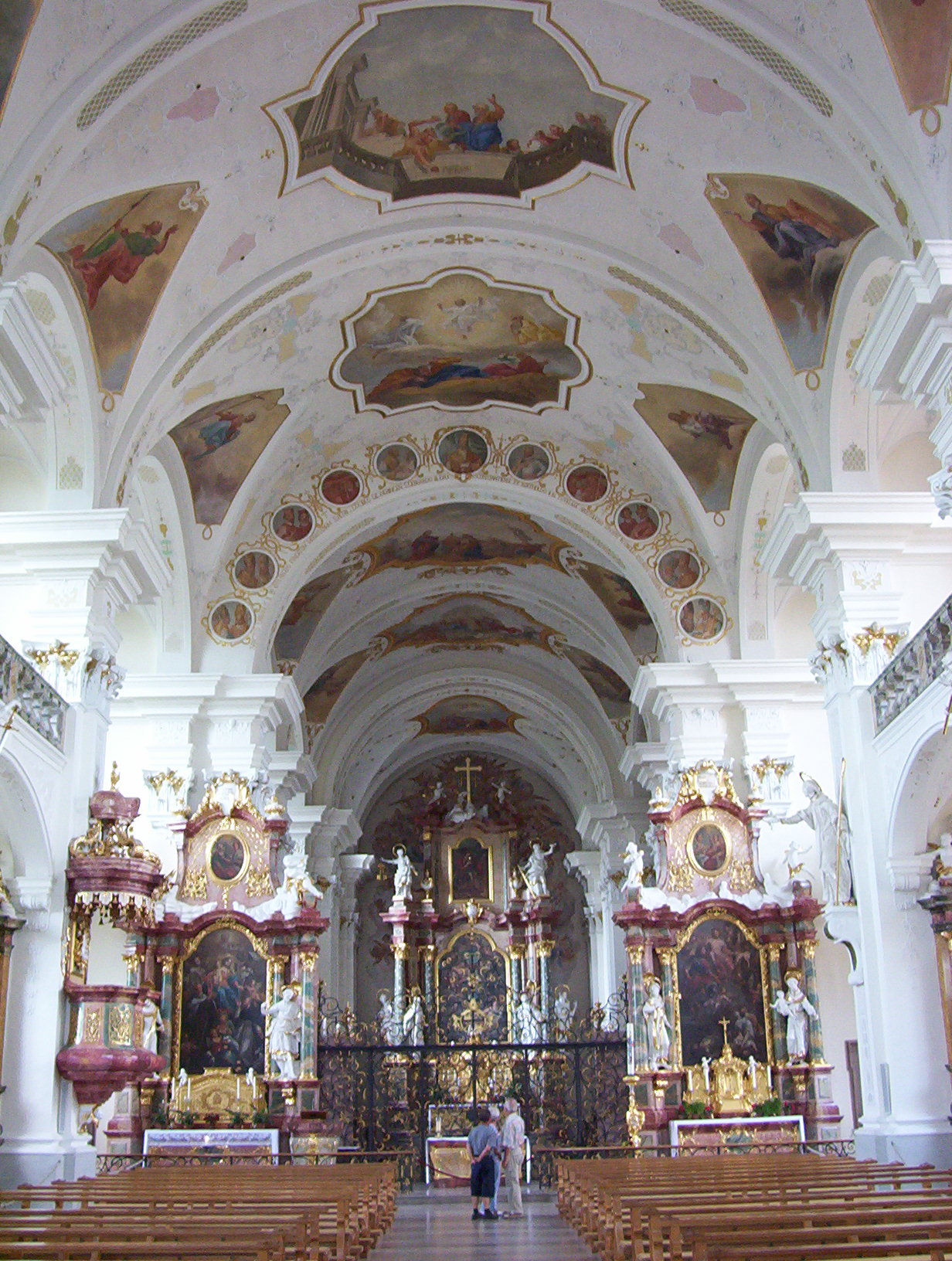
Interior of the abbey church

St Peter's Abbey in the Black Forest or St. Peter's Abbey, Schwarzwald (German: Kloster St. Peter auf dem Schwarzwald) is a former Benedictine monastery in the village of St. Peter im Schwarzwald in the district of Breisgau-Hochschwarzwald, Baden-Württemberg, Germany.

== History ==
The monastic community of St. Peter's was the house monastery and burial place of the Zähringen family. It was founded in Weilheim, in or before 1073, but was forced by hostile military action during the Investiture Controversy to move to Hirsau. Duke Berthold II of Zähringen (1078–1111) re-founded it as a family monastery, but decided in about 1090 to move it to the site which is now St. Peter im Schwarzwald.

Here it soon developed as a reformed Benedictine monastery directly answerable to the papacy, as witness for example the privilege of Pope Urban II of 10 March 1095. The Vögte (lords protectors) were initially the Zähringen family but, in the late 13th century, they were succeeded by the Counts of Urach, against whom the monks were eventually obliged to seek the protection of Emperor Charles IV. In 1526 the office passed to the Habsburgs. In the 1520s its prior Michael Sattler became a leader of the Anabaptists.

By the gift of the Zähringen family and their ministeriales the abbey acquired substantial property, particularly in the 11th and 12th centuries, located in the immediate area, in the Breisgau and in the Baar region, near Weilheim. The abbey, like most other landowners of the time, suffered significant loss of income and tenants after the middle of the 14th century.

The abbey suffered disastrous fires in 1238 and again in 1437. It lost importance in the later mediaeval period, and the monastic reforms of the 15th century had little effect here. Nevertheless, it managed to keep its property intact, even through the troubles of the Reformation. The premises were re-built in Baroque style in the 17th and 18th centuries; the present church with the two onion towers ("Zwiebeltürme") was built in the 1720s. The architect was Peter Thumb, and the opulent Baroque decoration was by Franz Joseph Spiegler (55 frescoes, 1727) and Joseph Anton Feuchtmayer (sculptures), among other artists and craftsmen. Peter Thumb also constructed the library. The abbey was dissolved in the secularisation of 1806.

== Abbots to 1544 ==
- Adalbero (1093–1100)
- Hugo I (1100–08)
- Eppo (1108–32)
- Gozmann (1132–37)
- Markward (1154–83)
- Rudolf of Reutenhalden (1183–91)
- Berthold I (1191–1220)
- Heinrich I (1220–55)
- Arnold (1255–75)
- Walther I (1275–91)
- Eberhard (1291–95)
- Gottfried of Lötschibach (1295–1322)
- Berthold II (1322–49)
- Walther II (1350–53)
- Johannes I of Immendingen (1353–57)
- Peter I of Thannheim (1357–66)
- Jakob I Stahelin (1367–80)
- Hugo II (1380–82)
- Heinrich II of Stein (1382–90)
- Heinrich III Salatin (1390–92)
- Johannes II of Stein (1392)
- Erhard (1392–1401)
- Benedikt I of Thannheim (1401–02)
- Johannes III (1402–04)
- Johannes IV Kanzler (1404–09)
- Heinrich IV von Oettlingen (1409–14)
- Heinrich V von Hornberg (1414–27)
- Johannes V Tüffer (1427–39)
- Jakob II von Altensummerau (1439–43)
- Konrad von Hofen (1443–49)
- Burkhard von Mansberg (1449–53)
- Johannes VI von Küssenberg (1453–69)
- Peter II Emhardt (1469–92)
- Simon Budner (1492–96)
- Peter III Gremmelsbach (1496–1512)
- Jodocus Kaiser (1512–31)
- Adam Guldin (1531–44)

Abbots of the Early Modern period include:

- Philipp Jakob Steyrer (1749–95)
- Ignaz Speckle (1795–1806)

== Burials ==
- Conrad I, Duke of Zähringen
- Agnes of Rheinfelden
- Berthold II, Duke of Swabia
