= Agnes of Poitou =

Holy Roman Empress from 1046 to 1056

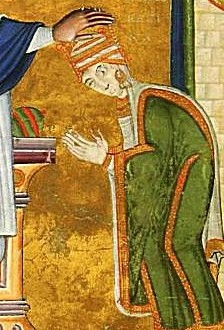
- Agnes at Mary's throne, Speyer Evangeliary, 1046

Empress of the Holy Roman Empire
- Tenure: 1046–1056
- Coronation: 25 December 1046

Queen consort of Germany
- Tenure: 1043–1056
- Born: c. 1025
- Died: 14 December 1077; Rome
- Spouse: Henry III, Holy Roman Emperor (m. 1043; died 1056)
- Issue more...: Adelaide II, Abbess of Quedlinburg; Henry IV, Holy Roman Emperor; Conrad II, Duke of Bavaria; Judith, Queen of Hungary; Matilda, Duchess of Swabia
- House: Ramnulfids
- Father: William V, Duke of Aquitaine
- Mother: Agnes of Burgundy

Agnes of Poitou (c. 1025 – 14 December 1077) was the queen of Germany from 1043 and empress of the Holy Roman Empire from 1046 until 1056 as the wife of Emperor Henry III. From 1056 to 1061, she ruled the Holy Roman Empire as regent during the minority of their son Henry IV.

After the death of her husband, she proved an inexperienced regent unable to effectively assert her power and secure loyal allies. In Germany, she is still remembered as a sympathetic historical figure, even if a flawed politician.

== Early life ==
Agnes was the daughter of the Ramnulfid Duke William V of Aquitaine (d. 1030) and Agnes of Burgundy and as such a member of the Ramnulfid family.

== Empress ==
Agnes married King Henry III of Germany in November 1043 (Note: Munster cites November 21; Jackson-Laufer cites November 1) at the Imperial Palace Ingelheim. She was his second wife after Gunhilda of Denmark, who had died, possibly from malaria, in 1038. This marriage helped to solidify the Empire's relationships with the princely houses in the west. King Henry was able to improve his position versus the French royal dynasty and to exert his influence in the Duchy of Burgundy. Agnes, like her husband, was of profound piety; her family had founded Cluny Abbey and Abbot Hugh the Great was godfather of her son Henry IV.

== Regency ==
After her husband's death on 5 October 1056, Empress Agnes served as regent on behalf of her young son Henry IV. Henry III had secured the election of his son as King of the Romans on his deathbed. Aided by Abbott Hugh of Cluny and Pope Victor II, also bishop of Eichstätt, Agnes tried to continue her husband's politics and to strengthen the rule of the Salian dynasty. However, despite being related to kings of Italy and Burgundy, she gained little respect as a leader. The loss of some of her family's ancestral lands later weakened her son's position tremendously.

After Henry's death, Agnes was placed in a difficult position between secular and religious powers. She had support from her retinue and territories she had brought from France upon her marriage, and she wanted to follow the example of Empress Adelheid. She was however more restricted than the Ottonian queen-empresses.

To win allies, she gave away three German duchies: already on Christmas 1056, the Ezzonid scion Conrad III, a nephew of Count palatine Ezzo of Lotharingia, received the Duchy of Carinthia. The next year she enfeoffed Rudolf of Rheinfelden with Swabia, appointed him administrator of Burgundy and offered him the hand of her daughter Matilda. According to the medieval chronicler Frutolf of Michelsberg, Rudolf had possibly abducted Matilda and extorted the betrothal. However, Agnes' late husband had promised the Swabian duchy to Berthold of Zähringen, who in turn had to be compensated with Carinthia upon Conrad's death in 1061.

At the same time, while German forces interfered in the fratricidal struggle of King Andrew I and Béla I of Hungary, Agnes ceded the Duchy of Bavaria to Count Otto of Nordheim. He reached a settlement with Hungary by enforcing the coronation of Andrew's son Solomon but later became a bitter rival of her son Henry IV.

Though initially a follower of the Cluniac Reforms, Agnes opposed the contemporary papal reform movement, and took the side of Italian anti-reform party. Things had worsened after the death of Pope Victor II in 1057: his successor Stephen IX was unable to take actual possession of Rome due to the Roman aristocracy's election of antipope Benedict X, and Stephen sent Anselm of Lucca (future Pope Alexander II) and Hildebrand of Sovana (future Pope Gregory VII) to Germany to obtain the support of Agnes as regent.

Though Stephen died before being able to return to Rome, Agnes' help was instrumental in enabling Hildebrand to depose the antipope and to replace him by the bishop of Florence, Nicholas II. Thereafter, on Easter 1059 Nicholas issued the momentous papal bull In nomine Domini establishing the cardinals as the sole electors of the pope, denying this power to the emperor and all temporal rulers, including Agnes herself.

When Pope Alexander II was elected on 30 September 1061, Empress Agnes refused to acknowledge him and had Honorius II elected. This schism did not end until Pentecost 1064. The empress' candidate could not prevail against the Roman Curia; in consequence, Agnes retired from politics, leaving the regency to her confidant Bishop Henry II of Augsburg.

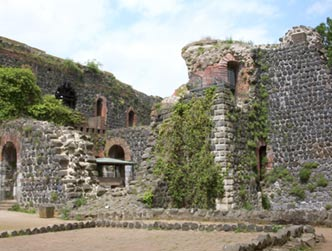
Kaiserswerth Pfalz ruins

Bishop Henry did not receive wide acceptance due to his awkward and haughty manners, as well as scandalous rumours about his relationship with the empress, as recorded by Lambert of Hersfeld. Moreover, the fact that the heir to the throne was raised by common ministeriales provoked anger among the princes. In 1062, young Henry IV was abducted by a group including Archbishop Anno II of Cologne and Otto of Nordheim, in a conspiracy to remove Agnes from the throne, referred to as the Coup of Kaiserswerth. Henry was brought to Cologne, and despite jumping overboard to escape, he was recaptured. From this point, the power shifted to Rome, as the pope elected the emperor.

Defeated, Agnes resigned as regent and was replaced by Anno together with the archbishops Siegfried of Mainz and Adalbert of Bremen.

== Later life ==
According to Frutolf of Michelsberg, Agnes retired to Fruttuaria Abbey after the coup. When Henry IV reached the age of majority, Agnes moved to Rome, where her arrival in 1065 is documented by Peter Damian. Agnes went on to act as a mediator and peacemaker between her son and the papacy. She died in Rome on 14 December 1077 and is buried at St. Peter's Basilica.

== Personality ==
Agnes was a reserved and gentle woman, lacking the sternness and imposing qualities that characterized successful Ottonian and Salian queen-empresses like Matilda, Adelaide, Theophanu, Kunigunde and Gisela.

== Legacy ==
Agnes is a featured figure on Judy Chicago's installation piece The Dinner Party, being represented as one of the 999 names on the Heritage Floor.

== Issue ==
Agnes and Henry's children were:

- Adelaide II (1045, Goslar – 11 January 1096), abbess of Gandersheim from 1061 and Quedlinburg from 1063
- Gisela (1047, Ravenna – 6 May 1053)
- Matilda (October 1048 – 12 May 1060, Pöhlde), married 1059 Rudolf of Rheinfelden, duke of Swabia and anti-king (1077)
- Henry, his successor
- Conrad II (1052, Regensburg – 10 April 1055), Duke of Bavaria (from 1054)
- Judith (1054, Goslar – 14 March 1092 or 1096), married firstly 1063 Solomon of Hungary and secondly 1089 Ladislaus I Herman, Duke of Poland

== Sources ==
- Chicago, Judy. The Dinner Party: From Creation to Preservation. London: Merrell (2007). ISBN 1858943701
- Robinson, I.S. Henry IV of Germany 1056–1106, 2000
- Women and Power in the Middle Ages: Political Aspects of Medieval Queenship PDF of an article from an unknown book, lacks footnote information.
- Brooke, Christopher (1987). Europe in the Central Middle Ages: 962-1154. Routledge.
- Henry Gardiner Adams, ed. (1857). "Agnes". A Cyclopaedia of Female Biography: 13. Wikidata Q115346632.
- Bachrach, Bernard S. (1993). Fulk Nerra, the Neo-Roman Consul 987–1040. University of California Press.
- Robinson, I.S. (2008). Eleventh-century Germany: The Swabian chronicles. Manchester University Press.
- Wiszewski, Przemyslaw (2010). Domus Bolezlai: Values and social identity in dynastic traditions of medieval Poland (c.966-1138). Brill.

Agnes of Poitou House of Poitiers Born: c. 1025 Died: 14 December 1077
Regnal titles
Preceded by Gunhilda of Denmark	Queen consort of Germany; 1043–1054	Succeeded by Bertha of Savoy
Preceded by Gisela of Swabia	Queen consort of Burgundy; 1043–1056	Succeeded by Bertha of Savoy
Preceded by Gisela of Swabia	Holy Roman Empress; 1046–1056	Succeeded by Bertha of Savoy
Preceded by Gisela of Swabia	Queen consort of Italy; 1043–1056	Succeeded by Bertha of Savoy
