= Matthias of Neuenburg =

Matthias of Neuenburg (1295 – between 1364 and 1370) was a chronicler.

== Biography ==
Matthias of Neuenburg was born in 1295, possibly in Neuenburg am Rhein in Baden. He studied jurisprudence at Bologna, and later received minor orders, but never became a priest. In 1327 he was solicitor of the episcopal court at Basel, and shortly after, while clerk to Bishop Berthold von Buchecke, held a similar position in Strasbourg. He died between 1364 and 1370, probably in Strasbourg.

He has been considered to be the author of a Latin chronicle from 1243 to 1350, and of its first continuation from 1350 to 1355. Later, three other writers carried on the work to 1368, 1374, and 1378 respectively. It is an important contribution to Alsatian and Habsburg history and for the times in which Matthias lived. It has been attributed to different writers, among them to the Speyer notary, Jacob of Mainz, also to Albert of Strasbourg, especially by earlier editors, while those of later times attribute it to Matthias of Neuenburg. For the voluminous literature on this controversy see August Potthast, Bibliotheca Kin. Med. Aevi. (Berlin, 1896).

Among the editions are:

- Alberti Argentinensis Chronici fragmentum, an appendix to Johannes Cuspinian's work De consulibus Romanorum commentarii (Basle, 1553), 667–710, very much abridged;
- G. Studer, Matthiae Neoburgensis chronica cum continuatione et vita Berchtoldi;
- Die Chronik des Matthias von Neuenburg, from the Bern and Strasbourg manuscripts (Bern, 1866);
- A. Huber, Mathiae Neuwenburgensis Cronica, 1273-1350 in Bohmer, Fontes rerum Germanicarum, IV (Stuttgart, 1868), 149–276;
- Continuationes, 276–297

It has also been edited from a Vienna and a Vatican manuscript in Abhandlungen der Gesellschaft der Wissenschaften, xxxvii-viii (Göttingen, 1891-2), and translated into German by Grandaur (Leipzig, 1892).
