= Gutnau Priory =

Nunnery in Baden-Württemberg, Germany

Coordinates: 47.7940°N 7.57214°E

Gutnau Priory, also spelled Guttnau or Guttenau (German: Kloster Gutnau, Guttnau or Guttenau), was a small Benedictine nunnery in Neuenburg am Rhein, in the district Breisgau-Hochschwarzwald in Baden-Württemberg in southern Germany.

== History ==
According to Caspar Molitor, abbot of St. Blaise's Abbey, the nunnery was founded in 1181 by Guta, sister and heiress of the last lord of Au (Auggen, Owon), on and with her inheritance; Guta was a nun of Sitzenkirch Priory, which was subordinate to St. Blaise's. The nunnery buildings were apparently first sited right on the bank of the river Rhine, but were later relocated further inland for fear of flooding. In 1260 nuns from Sitzenkirch moved to Gutnau without the permission of the abbot of Saint Blaise's, but were made to return to Sitzenkirch in 1261.

By the 15th century the community had become very impoverished. In 1423 the premises burned down to the ground, and there were not enough funds for more than an inadequate reconstruction. By 1492 the monastery was no longer able to finance itself and became a subordinate provostry of St. Blaise's Abbey. There were only two nuns in 1513. In 1525 the nunnery was plundered and laid waste in the Peasants' War, although according to Caspar Molitor a community of some sort was resident in 1530.

It is presumed to have been dissolved during the Reformation in 1556. St. Blaise's Abbey retained the lands for some years. By 1630 they had passed to Bürgeln Priory, and by 1657 to that of Krozingen. Such buildings as remained were destroyed by the French in 1675. In 1780 the last remaining property rights were sold. There are no surviving remains of the nunnery.
