= Neuenburg am Rhein =

- Town
- Coat of arms

- Location of Neuenburg am Rhein within Breisgau-Hochschwarzwald district
- Interactive map of Neuenburg am Rhein
- Location within Germany Location within Baden-Württemberg
- Coordinates: 47°48′53″N 7°33′43″E
- Country: Germany
- State: Baden-Württemberg
- District: Breisgau-Hochschwarzwald
- Subdivisions: 4

Government
  - Mayor (2023–31): Jens Fondy-Langela

Area
  - Total: 44.1 km^{2} (17.0 sq mi)
- Elevation: 230 m (750 ft)

Population (2025-12-31)
  - Total: 12,738
  - Density: 289/km^{2} (748/sq mi)
- Time zone: UTC+01:00 (CET)
  - Summer (DST): UTC+02:00 (CEST)
- Postal codes: 79389–79395
- Dialling codes: 07631
- Vehicle registration: FR
- Website: www.neuenburg.de

Neuenburg am Rhein (German pronunciation: [ˈnɔʏənˌbʊʁk ʔam ˈʁaɪn], lit. 'Neuenburg on the Rhine'; High Alemannic: Neiburg am Rhi) is a town in the district Breisgau-Hochschwarzwald in Baden-Württemberg in southern Germany.

== Geography ==
=== Geographical location ===
Neuenburg is elevated on the right bank of the Altrhein on a terrace between the Vosges and the Black Forest, halfway between Freiburg im Breisgau and Basel at the former confluence of the Klemmbach in the Rhine.

Here, a path from the Black Forest (Todtnau) to Mulhouse, the current Bundesstraße 378, crosses with the old waterway transport route Rhine. In addition, at the time of the town's founding by the Zähringer, one of the few fords across the Rhine was located here. In the thalweg of the Altrhein lies the state border between Germany and France. Nowadays, the Grand Canal d'Alsace on the French side of the border runs parallel to the Altrhein.

=== Extension of the urban area ===
The urban area runs along the Altrhein and lies mostly on a part of the Rhine Plain with the Rheinwald and the Niederterrasse. The district of Steinenstadt also contains a vineyard as exclave in the Vorbergzone between the towns of Auggen and Schliengen. The city also has an oak forest in the Black Forest.

=== Neighboring municipalities ===
Neighboring municipalities are in the north Hartheim am Rhein and Eschbach, in the northeast Heitersheim and Buggingen, in the east Müllheim and Auggen, in the southeast Schliengen and in the south Bad Bellingen. To the west of the Rhine, in the Alsace, the municipality Chalampé, as well as the communes Ottmarsheim und Bantzenheim are located.

=== Town structure ===
In addition to the core town district Neuenburg (with the settlement "Im Stein"), the town has three districts: Steinenstadt, Grißheim and Zienken.

District	Municipal area	Population (December 31, 2016)
Neuenburg	6,42 sq mi (16,64 km^{2})	8658
Steinenstadt	2,90 sq mi (7,50 km^{2})	1488
Grißheim	6,05 sq mi (15,68 km^{2})	1457
Zienken	1,66 sq mi (4,30 km^{2})	941

== History ==
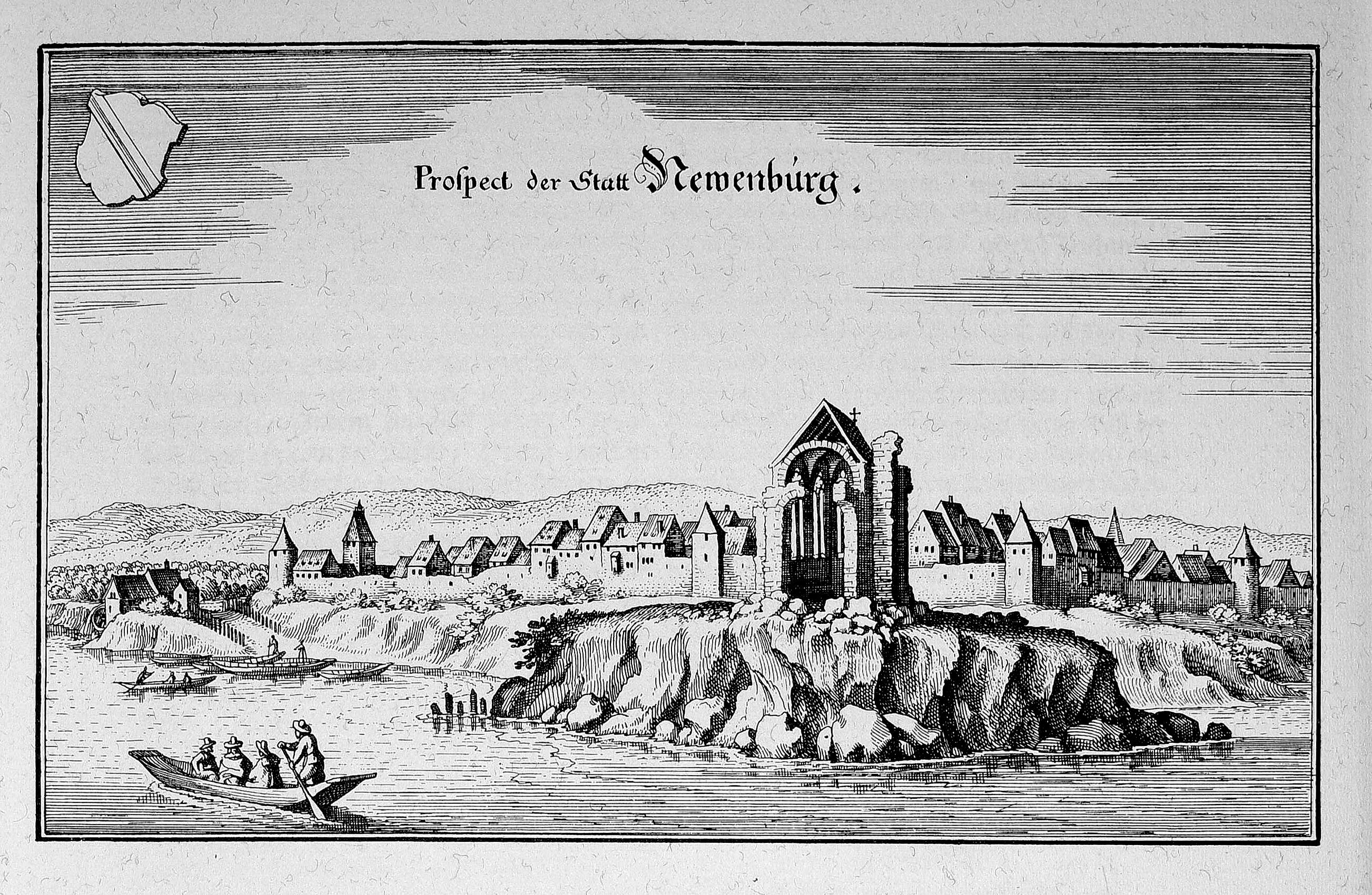
Remnants of the magnificent minster destroyed by the flooding: the choir

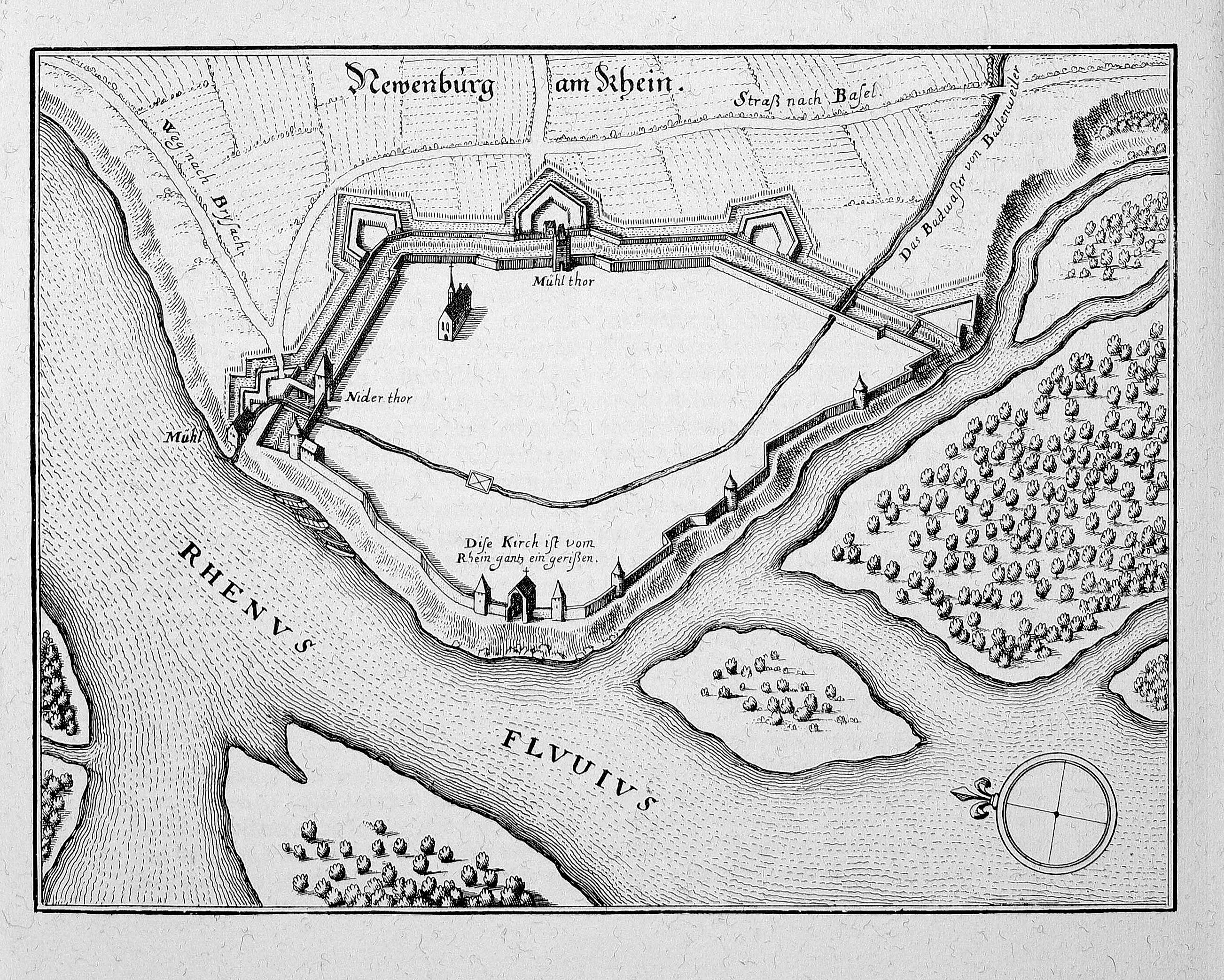
Neuenburg and its location on the Rhine, c. 1660.

=== Until the 19th century ===
Neuenburg am Rhein was founded in 1175 by Berthold IV, Duke of Zähringen, in the shape of a cross at the intersection of two roads. The immediate cause of the foundation was the expansion by the Hohenstaufen family from their possessions in Badenweiler toward their possessions in the Alsace. By founding Neuenburg, the Zähringen family could control the crossing of the Rhine river and exact a toll. The Zähringens, however, died out in 1218.

The Benedictine Gutnau Priory, according to a note in abbot Caspar Molitoris's Liber Originum, was founded by Guta, a nun from Sitzenkirch Monastery in Lörrach, in 1181. The monastery's original building was probably right on the Rhine bank, but was later rebuilt closer to Auggen.

In 1219, the town was declared a free imperial city by Frederick II, Holy Roman Emperor; this was confirmed in 1274. The town flourished in the Middle Ages and achieved political importance because of its location on the Rhine. Between 1272/73 and 1283, Johannes Brunwart was Schultheiß of Neuenburg; five of his (conventional) Minnesang poems are collected in the early-14th c. Codex Manesse.

On December 24, 1292, the city of King Adolf of Nassau received the Adolphinische privilege. In 1302, a devastating flood of the Rhine almost destroyed half the city. In 1311, the town came to the Habsburgs and became a part of Further Austria. In 1403, King Rupert extended the city law. In 1525, another flood destroyed half of the city, as well as the once so magnificent minster to the choir.

The Thirty Years' War took place between 1618 and 1648. Troops of various origins moved through the city; them and the entire environment had to endure different occupations, many lootings as well as destruction. The loss of population was very high. In 1675, the Neuenburg Capuchin Monastery, which had only been built in 1612, was slighted by Vauban. In the War of the Spanish Succession, Neuenburg got into the war zone as well, especially before the Battle of Friedlingen near Basel on October 14, 1702. In April 1704, after two years of French occupation, Neuenburg was completely destroyed at the command of King Louis XIV of France, and the population was taken up in the territory of the Prince-Bishopric of Basel in Schliengen and Steinenstadt. In the following years and decades, more wars of succession took place. Again and again, there were clashes between Habsburg on the right side of the Rhine and France on the left side of the Rhine, while Neuenburg as a so-called "front city" changed occupation several times.

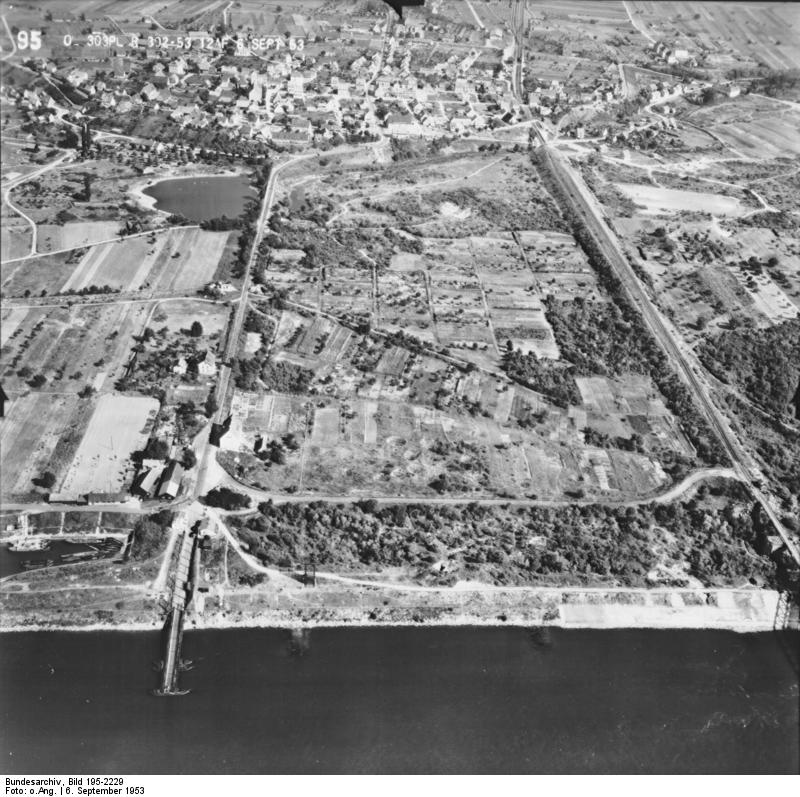
Aerial view of the city from the west from a Rhine overflight of the Allies (September 6, 1953): on the left the road to Chalampé with parts of the provisional pontoon bridge over the Rhine, at the top left the "Wuhrloch", at the bottom left a corner of the now no longer existing Rhine port, on the right the railway line of Mulhouse with shadows of the remnants of the railway bridge over the Rhine, which was blown up by the Wehrmacht on their retreat on February 9, 1945 (picture dated before the completion of the Grand Canal d'Alsace)

After the conquest of the right-Rhine areas by Napoléon Bonaparte and the reorganization of the ownerships by him, the Habsburgs lost the territories of Further Austria. In 1806, the city of Neuenburg was incorporated into the 1806 newly founded Grand Duchy of Baden, which became a state of the German Reich in 1871.

=== 20th Century ===
After the attack of the Wehrmacht on France in 1940, Neuenburg was under fire. It was the first German city to be completely destroyed during the Second World War.

On February 9, 1945, after fighting for the Colmar Pocket, the last German troops retreated over the bridge from Chalampé to Neuenburg and blew up the bridge at 8 o'clock in the morning, therefore ending the battle for this bridgehead. In 1962/1963, the new construction of a road bridge in combination with a single track railway bridge was completed. It leads over the Rhine, which is now divided into the Altrhein and the Grand Canal d'Alsace, and it inaugurated in August 1963.

In April 1945, after the conquest by the French Army, World War II ended for Neuenburg. The city became part of the French zone of occupation and part of South Baden. In 1952, South Baden, together with Württemberg-Hohenzollern and Württemberg-Baden, became the new federal state Baden-Württemberg.

On December 19, 1959, the route Neuenburg - Märkt on the Grand Canal d'Alsace was inaugurated solemnly.

=== Incorporations ===
On December 1, 1971, Zienken was incorporated into Neuenburg. On January 1, Grißheim's incorporation followed and the municipality Steinenstadt was incorporated on January 1, 1975. The city has been carrying the name addition "am Rhein" since March 18, 1975.

== Politics ==
=== Municipal council ===
The municipal council in Neuenburg currently has 24 seats, with 10 seats belonging to the Christlich Demokratische Union Deutschlands, 9 seats belonging to the Freie Wählervereinigung Neuenburg e. V., and 5 seats belonging to the Sozialdemokratische Partei Deutschlands. The major is the chairman of the municipal council and is allowed to vote.

=== Mayor ===
Since 1991, and after reelections in 1999, 2007 and 2015, Joachim Schuster (CDU) (born 1956) is the major of Neuenburg am Rhein.

However, the election of 2015 was declared invalid by the administrative court of Freiburg because of a newspaper article that seemed too biased. The election was repeated in March 2016, and Schuster was reelected with more than 72 percent of the votes.

=== Coat of arms ===
The blazon of the coat of arms says "In red a golden slanting bar".

== Sons and daughters of the town ==
- Matthias of Neuenburg (1295-1364), chronicler and bishop of Strasbourg
- Uli Edel (b. 1947), film director
- Mike Jenkins (b. 1985), American football player
- Andreas Bornemann (b. 1971), former German soccer player and now chairman of the 1. FC Nurnberg

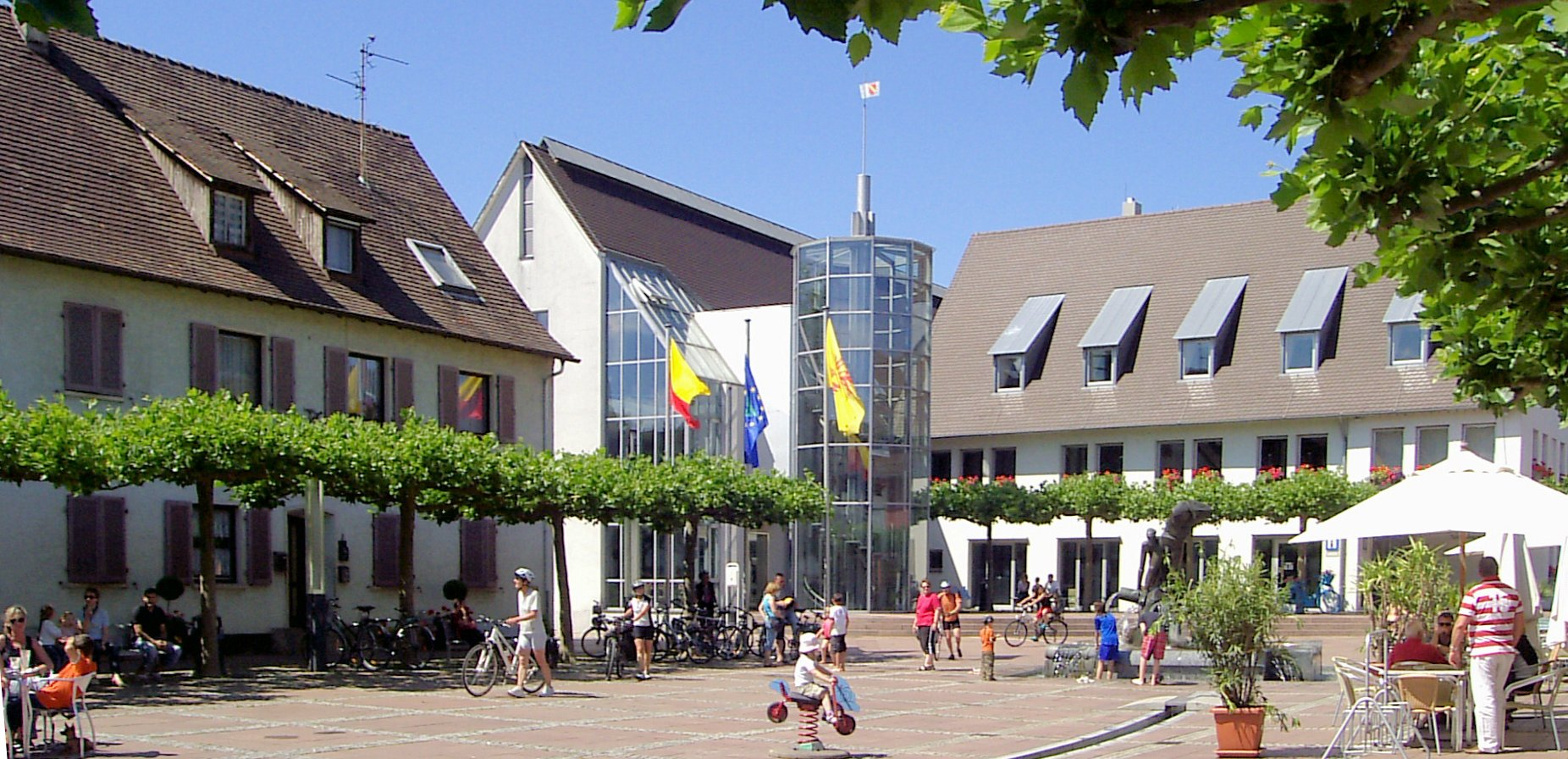
Neuenburg am Rhein, Town hall place

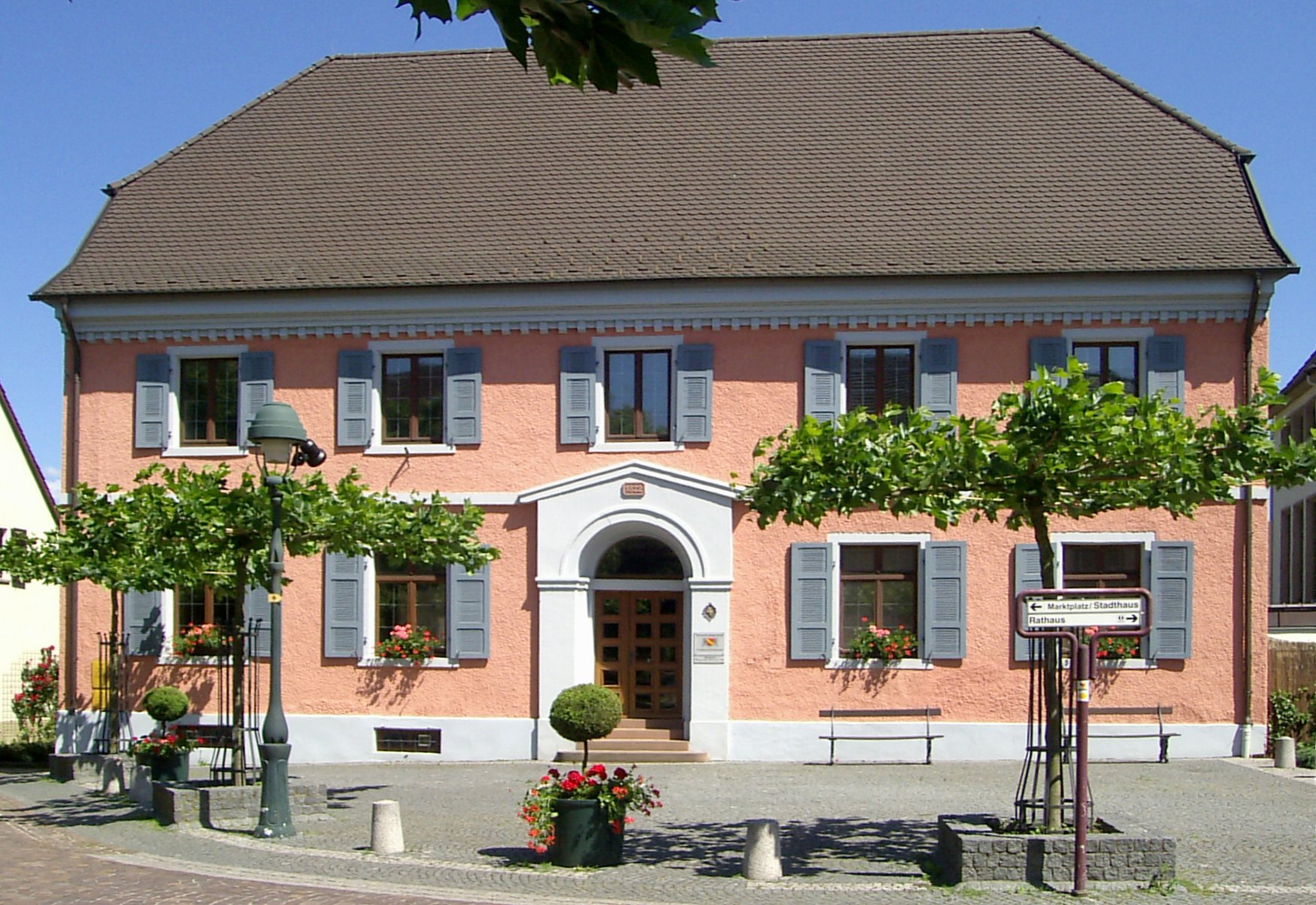
Neuenburg, Local museum
