= Agnes of Rheinfelden =

Duchess of Swabia and Zähringen (1065–1111)

- Duchess of Swabia; Duchess of Zähringen
- Born: c. 1065
- Died: 19 December 1111
- Noble family: Rheinfelden
- Spouse: Berthold II, Duke of Swabia
- Father: Rudolf of Rheinfelden
- Mother: Adelaide of Savoy

Agnes of Rheinfelden (*c. 1065; † 19 December 1111) was the daughter of Rudolf of Rheinfelden, and the wife of Berthold II of Zähringen, Duke of Swabia.

== Life ==
Agnes was the daughter of Rudolf von Rheinfelden, duke of Swabia, and anti-king of Germany, and his wife Adelaide of Savoy. Her sisters were Bertha of Rheinfelden, countess of Kellmünz, and Adelaide of Rheinfelden, queen consort of Hungary. In 1079, shortly after her mother’s death. Agnes married Berthold II of Zähringen. After the deaths of her father, Rudolf, in 1080, and her sister, Adelaide, and her brother, Berthold of Rheinfelden, who both died in 1090, Agnes inherited much of the property of her natal dynasty.

Agnes was the founder of the abbey of St. Peter in the Black Forest, burial site for members of her husband’s dynasty (the Zähringer).

Agnes and her husband died within a few months of each other in 1111. They were both interred at St Peter in the Blackforest, an abbey they founded, which became the main burial place for their dynasty.

== Marriage and children ==
Agnes had at least eight children with Berthold II, including four sons, and four (or perhaps five) daughters:

- Berthold (* c.1080)
- Rudolf II (* c.1082; † 1111), count of Rheinfelden
- Berthold III, duke of Zähringen (r.1111-1122), succeeded by his brother, Conrad I
- Conrad I, Duke of Zähringen
- Agnes (d. after 8 January 1125), married William II of Burgund-Besançon
- Liutgard (died young)
- Petrissa (* c.1095; d. before 1116), married Frederick I of Pfirt
- Liutgard (* c.1098; d. 25 March 1131), married Godfrey of Calw
- Judith (* c.1100), married Ulrich II of Gammertingen
