= Werner of Magdeburg =

Werner of Steusslingen (died 7 August 1078) was the archbishop of Magdeburg from 1063 until his death. His episcopate was dominated by the Investiture Contest. He was an ally of King Henry IV of Germany until 1073, when he joined the first Saxon revolt. Imprisoned in 1075 and released the following year, he joined the second Saxon revolt in 1077. He was killed at the battle of Mellrichstadt.

== Rise ==
Werner belonged to the Steusslingen family, part of the lesser nobility of the Duchy of Swabia. His father was Walter and his mother Eggela (Engela). She was buried in Magdeburg Cathedral. His brother was Archbishop Anno II of Cologne and his sister's son was Bishop Burchard II of Halberstadt. He and Burchard owed their episcopal appointments in the Duchy of Saxony to the influence of Anno on King Henry IV.

Prior to his appointment as archbishop, Werner was the provost of Maria ad Gradus, which Anno had founded in Cologne. When the see of Magdeburg became vacant, Anno had Henry overturn the cathedral chapter's election and appoint Werner. Adam of Bremen in his Gesta Hammaburgensis ecclesiae pontificum cites the case of Werner as exemplary of Anno's baleful nepotism. The anonymous author of the Gesta archiepiscoporum Magdeburgensium considered Werner to lack qualification for high office, being "a mild man and not sharp-witted".

Werner was an ally of Henry IV until 1072–1073. He frequently attended Henry's court and Henry twice visited Magdeburg during this period. Werner's last appearance at court was in March 1072 at Goslar. Henry celebrated Pentecost in Magdeburg on 27 May 1072. By July 1073, however, Werner was, alongside his nephew, one of the leaders of the eastern Saxon revolt. According to Bruno of Merseburg, his reasons were the same as those of the princes and boiled down to opposition to Henry IV's policy of recovering demesne lands in eastern Saxony that had been usurped during his minority.

== Revolts ==
A letter addressed by Werner to Archbishop Siegfried I of Mainz in 1074 or 1075 is an important source on the early phase of the revolt and the rebels' thinking. According to Werner, Henry IV seized the Saxon princes' lands arbitrarily and "not because of any fault on our part", but in order to reward the less wealthy members of his household (familiares), and then "fortified the more inaccessible places in our region with very strong castles." Henry's "personal garrisons" he even accused of "kill[ing] those who wished to defend their liberty." Werner blamed the desecration of graves in the Harzburg on "peasants with [their] characteristic ignorance." He was not only interested in defending the rebels' actions, however, but in averting the coming royal expedition. He asked Siegfried to intercede for the Saxons with the king.

In the spring of 1075, according to Bruno, Henry IV was willing to reconcile with Werner and the other Saxon rebels on the condition that they hand over Burchard of Halberstadt and the other major conspirators. Since he would not guarantee a trial before their peers, his offer was rebuffed. The rebels were crushed at the battle of Homburg on 9 June and the main rebels surrendered to the king in late October. Werner was imprisoned in Goslar.

In the summer of 1076, Henry released Werner as a show of goodwill, perhaps at the insistence of Pope Gregory VII. This move failed to calm the Saxons or to convert Werner, who immediately joined a new revolt. In March 1077, he was one of the electors of Rudolf of Rheinfelden as anti-king. He was one of those clergymen who fled at the start of the battle of Mellrichstadt on 7 August 1078, causing Rudolf's army to panic. In the defeat, Werner was killed. He was buried in the Abbey of Our Lady in Magdeburg, to which he had shown favour.

Assessments of Werner's pontificate have generally been negative. The author of the Gesta archiepiscoporum Magdeburgensium referred to "the harm inflicted on [the] church" by Werner. He has been compared unfavourably to Burchard, who had skills commensurate with his office. Werner is described as "a shadowy figure" compared to his "astute and energetic" nephew, although he had brought some benefit to his church from royal generosity during the first decade of his episcopate. Overall, his pontificate was "not a blessing" for the church.

== Bibliography ==
- Blumenthal, Uta-Renate (1988). The Investiture Controversy: Church and Monarchy from the Ninth to the Twelfth Century. University of Pennsylvania Press.
- Hertel, Gustav (1897). "Werner (Wezilo)". Allgemeine Deutsche Biographie (in German). Vol. 42. Leipzig: Duncker & Humblot. p. 28..
- Robinson, Ian S. (2004) [1999]. Henry IV of Germany, 1056–1106. Cambridge University Press.
