= Battle of Flarchheim =

Middle ages battle in 1080 (in modern Germany)

- Part of the Saxon revolt of 1077–1088
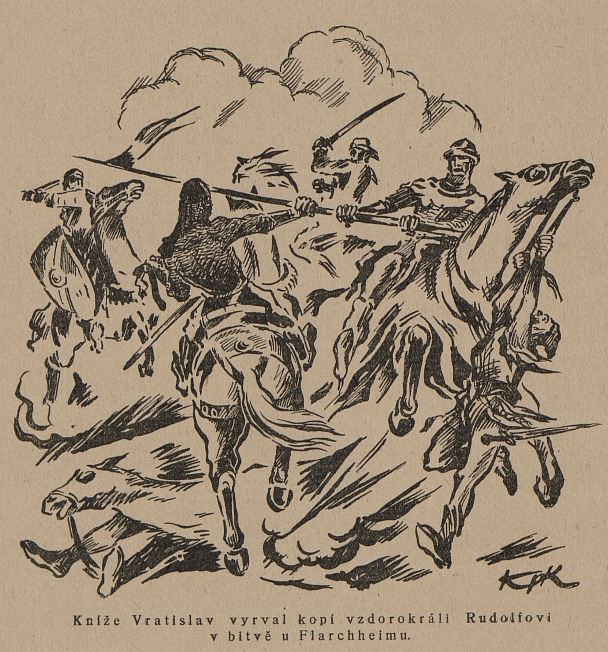
- Czech prince Vratislaus II is taking so-called The Holy Lance from Rudolf of Rheinfelden in the battle of Flarchheim (J. Konůpek, published in J. V. Šimák: Kronika československá, Díl I., 1922)
Date	January 27, 1080
Location	Flarchheim
Result	Inconclusive

Belligerents
Henry IV, Holy Roman Emperor; Vratislaus II of Bohemia	Rudolf of Swabia

Casualties and losses
Heavy	38

The Battle of Flarcheim was fought between German king Henry IV and the German anti-king Rudolf of Swabia on January 27, 1080 near Flarchheim.

== Prelude ==
Rudolf appeared to be vulnerable after losing the support of some of the Saxon princes. Henry decided to take advantage of this vulnerability and marched out against him in the winter of 1079–1080. Rudolf sought out Henry and met him at Flachheim between Eisenach and Mühlhausen in Thuringia.

== Battle ==
Rudolf had arrayed his army on a hill behind a stream. Rather than attack Rudolf and possibly get caught with his forces straddling the stream, Henry opted to march around the obstacle.

Henry struck Rudolf's army from the rear, but, with an ensuing snowstorm, the attack became disorganized. On one hand there are reports of the Saxons being attacked and driven off after duke Vratislaus II of Bohemia cut down the Saxon standard during the snowstorm. Consequently, Vratislaus was able to capture Rudolf's golden lance.

On the other hand, Ekkehard of Aura reports that Otto of Nordheim attacked and plundered Henry's camp before forcing the surrender of the Franconians and the Bohemians. Berthold (possibly Berthold of Ratisbon) states that the armies became separated in the dark and that Rudolf was forced to withdraw to a neighboring village by the cold.

The next day Rudolf returned to the field, but Henry had withdrawn to Franconia.
