= Matilda of Germany, Duchess of Swabia =

Daughter of Emperor Henry III (c.1048–1060)

Matilda of Swabia

Duchess consort of Swabia
- Reign: 1059–1060
- Successor: Adelaide of Savoy
- Born: c. 1048; Pöhlde
- Died: 12 May 1060; Goslar(?)
- Burial: Monastery of SS. Simon and Jude in Goslar
- Spouses: Rudolf of Rheinfelden
- Issue: Berthold of Rheinfelden (disputed)
- House: Salian Dynasty
- Father: Henry III of Germany
- Mother: Agnes of Poitou

Matilda of Swabia (c. 1048 – 12 May 1060), a member of the Salian dynasty, was the daughter of Emperor Henry III from his second marriage with Agnes of Poitou. By her marriage to Rudolf of Rheinfelden, she was Duchess of Swabia from 1059-1060, before her early death.

== Life ==
Matilda was the third daughter of Emperor Henry III and Empress Agnes, a daughter of the French duke William V of Aquitaine. Among her older siblings were Adelaide, who became Abbess of Quedlinburg and Gandersheim, and Gisela, who died in infancy. Her younger siblings included her brothers Henry IV, who succeeded their father as Holy Roman Emperor in 1056, and Conrad II, who also died in infancy, and a sister, Judith of Swabia, who was queen consort of Hungary from 1063 to 1074. In addition, Matilda had an older half-sister, Beatrix, Abbess of Quedlinburg and Gandersheim, born from her father's first marriage with Princess Gunhilda of Denmark.

Matilda was probably born in October 1048 in Pöhlde, although some sources indicate that she was born before this, perhaps as early as 1045. When she was, at most, twelve years old, Matilda was betrothed to Rudolf of Rheinfelden in 1057. Their marriage took place in 1059. It is possible that Matilda was the mother of Rudolf’s son, Berthold of Rheinfelden. (The identity of Berthold’s mother is disputed, and she is sometimes said to be Rudolf’s second wife, Adelaide of Savoy.)

Matilda died on 12 May 1060, probably in Goslar, and was buried at the monastery of SS Simon and Jude in Goslar.

== Notes ==
Matilda of Germany, Duchess of Swabia Salian Dynasty Born: c. 1048 Died: 12 October 1060
Regnal titles
Preceded by Immilla of Turin	Duchess of Swabia; 1059–1060	Succeeded by Adelaide of Savoy
