= Battle of Mellrichstadt =

Middle ages battle in 1078 in Germany

- Part of the Saxon revolt of 1077–1088
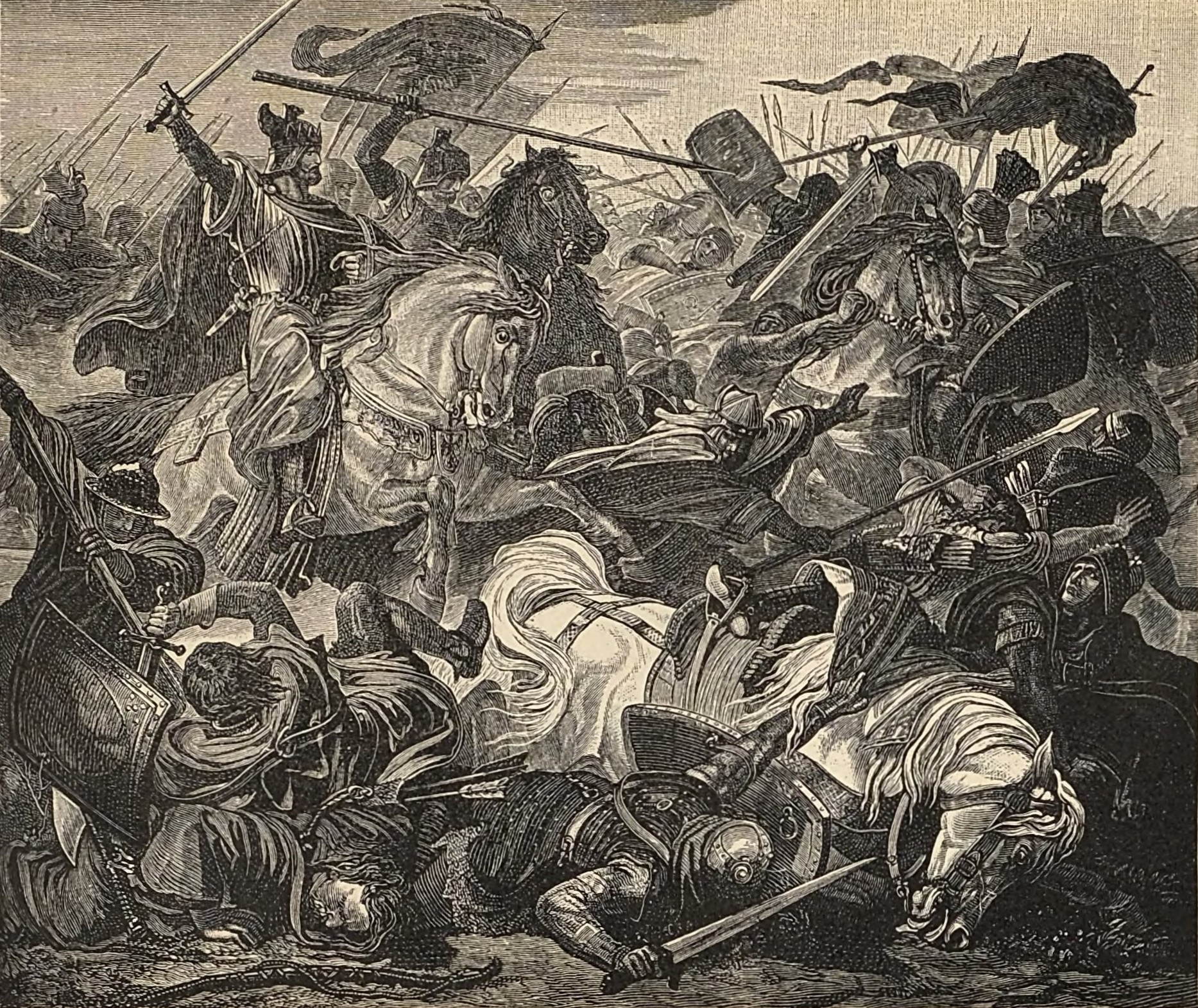
- Emperor Henry IV defeats his rival at the battle (illustration by Michael Echter, c. 1870)
Date	7 August 1078
Location	Mellrichstadt (Germany)
Result	Inconclusive

Belligerents
Henry IV	Rudolf of Swabia

Battle of Mellrichstadt was fought between Holy Roman Emperor Henry IV and the German anti-king Rudolf of Swabia on 7 August 1078 near Mellrichstadt.

Henry's army met the army of Rudolf's Saxon allies before they could meet up with the Swabians. In the confusion, one Saxon force including the bishops Werner of Magdeburg and Werner of Merseburg and Rudolf fled as soon as the armies met. They were harassed by the local people of the district while they fled home. Elsewhere, the Saxons under Otto of Nordheim and Frederick of Sommerschenburg bested their opponents and chased them in the direction of Würzburg. On his return, he found another army occupying the field. When his scouts did not return, he assumed it was the enemy and returned home, not knowing that it was a Saxon contingent.
