= Reinfeld =

Reinfeld may refer to:

- Reinfeld, Schleswig-Holstein, a town in Schleswig-Holstein, Germany
- Reinfeld, Manitoba, a town in Canada
- Reinfeld, a small village near Templin, Brandenburg, Germany
- Reinfeld Colony, a Mennonite settlement in Misiones Department, Paraguay
- Fred Reinfeld (1910–1964), American chess player and writer

== See also ==
- Fredrik Reinfeldt (born 1965), Prime Minister of Sweden
