= Adelaide of Rheinfelden =

Queen consort of Hungary from 1077 to 1990

Queen consort of Hungary
- Tenure: 25 April 1077 – May 1090
- Born: c. 1065
- Died: May 1090
- Spouse: Ladislaus I of Hungary
- Issue: Wife of Iaroslav Sviatopolchich of Volhinia; Piroska, Byzantine Empress
- House: Rheinfelden
- Father: Rudolf of Rheinfelden
- Mother: Adelaide of Savoy

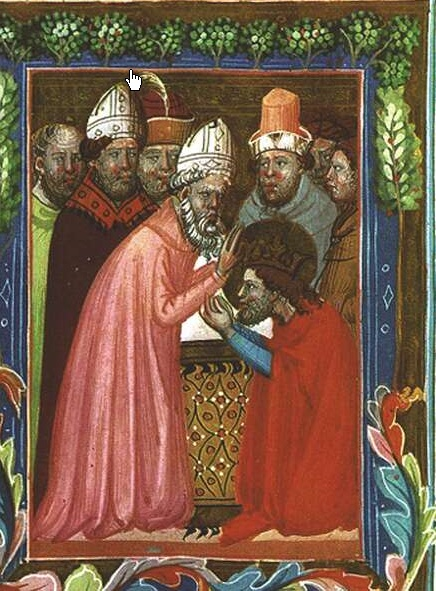
SV. Ladislav

Adelaide of Rheinfelden (or Adelaide of Swabia) (German: Adelheid) (1060s – May 1090), was Queen of Hungary by marriage to King Ladislaus I.

== Life ==
Adelaide was born circa 1065 to Rudolf of Rheinfelden, duke of Swabia and German anti-king, and his second wife, Adelaide of Savoy. Her maternal aunt was Bertha of Savoy, who was married to Henry IV of Germany.

Around 1077/8 Adelaide married Ladislaus I of Hungary, a member of the Árpád dynasty. Ladislaus agreed to support Rudolf in his struggle for the throne against Henry IV of Germany. In 1079 Adelaide's mother died, followed in 1080 by her father, who fell at the Battle of Elster.

In 1081, Pope Gregory VII wrote to Adelaide, urging her to encourage her husband to support monasteries and be generous to the poor and the weak. He also exhorted her to emulate the Virgin Mary.

Adelaide died in May 1090 and her husband outlived her by 5 years. She was buried in Veszprém Cathedral, Veszprém, Hungary, where her gravestone remains.

== Issue ==
Adelaide had two children:

- Piroska of Hungary (c. 1080 – August 13, 1134), wife of John II, emperor of the Byzantine Empire
- Unknown daughter, wife of Prince Yaroslav of Volhynia.

Adelaide of Rheinfelden Rheinfelden Born: c. 1060 Died: May 1090
Royal titles
Preceded by Synadene	Queen consort of Hungary; 1077–1090	Succeeded by Felicia of Sicily
