= Rudolf of Rheinfelden =

Duke of Swabia from 1057 to 1079

- Duke of Swabia
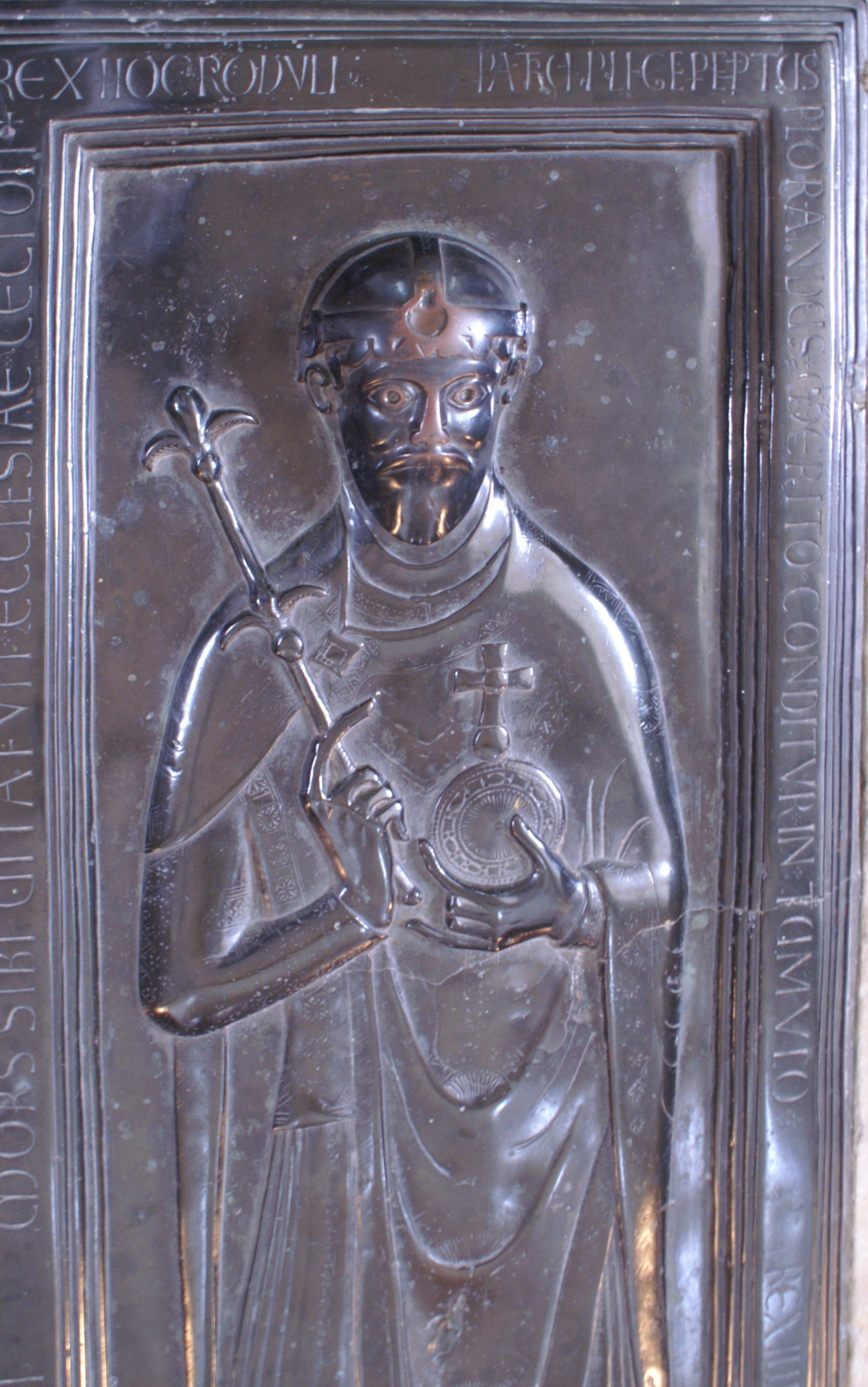
- Bronze graveslab, Merseburg Cathedral
- Born: c. 1025
- Died: 15 October 1080; Hohenmölsen, Saxon Eastern March
- Buried: Merseburg Cathedral
- Spouses: Matilda of Swabia; Adelaide of Savoy
- Issue: Agnes of Rheinfelden; Adelaide of Rheinfelden; Bertha of Rheinfelden; Otto; Berthold of Rheinfelden (disputed)
- Father: Kuno of Rheinfelden

Rudolf of Rheinfelden (c. 1025 – 15 October 1080; German: Rudolf von Rheinfelden) was Duke of Swabia from 1057 to 1079. Initially a follower of his brother-in-law, the Salian emperor Henry IV, his election as German anti-king in 1077 marked the outbreak of the Great Saxon Revolt and the first phase of open conflict in the Investiture Controversy between the Emperor and the Papacy. After a series of armed conflicts, Rudolf succumbed to his injuries after his forces defeated Henry's in the Battle on the Elster.

== Life ==
Rudolf was the son of the Swabian count (German: Graf) Kuno of Rheinfelden. He was first mentioned in a 1048 deed issued by the Salian emperor Henry III as a count in the Swabian Sisgau on the High Rhine (in present-day Northwestern Switzerland), an estate then held by the Prince-Bishopric of Basel. Rudolf's family had large possessions up to Sankt Blasien Abbey in the Black Forest and down to the Aargau beyond the border with the Kingdom of Burgundy. He probably was related to King Rudolph II of Burgundy (d. 937), the Dukes of Lorraine, and the Ottonian dynasty.

=== Duke of Swabia ===
When Duke Otto III of Swabia died without male heirs in 1057, Empress Agnes, consort of late Henry III, appointed Rudolf Swabian duke and administrator of Burgundy. Rivalling with the Zähringen count Berthold, Rudolf, according to Frutolf of Michelsberg, had taken advantage of the minority of Agnes' son Henry IV, elected King of the Romans, by kidnapping his sister Matilda of Swabia. Rudolf demanded, and received, Matilda's hand in marriage (1059). In 1061 Berthold received the Duchy of Carinthia instead. When Matilda died in 1060, Rudolf subsequently, in 1066, married Adelaide of Savoy (d. 1079), a daughter of Count Otto of Savoy and Adelaide of Susa. When Adelaide's sister Bertha of Savoy married Henry IV in 1066, Rudolf became brother-in-law to the king twice over.

During Agnes' regency, the Princes of the Holy Roman Empire could further strengthen their position against the Imperial authority. In the 1062 Coup of Kaiserswerth, several princes led by Archbishop Anno II of Cologne even abducted the minor king to enforce the surrender of the Imperial Regalia. When Henry came of age in 1065, he continued the policies of his father against the reluctant Saxon nobility, sparking the Saxon Rebellion in 1073. While other princes like the Carinthian duke Berthold of Zähringen or Duke Welf of Bavaria distanced themselves, Rudolf supported Henry's campaigns in Thuringia, when he was a primary force in the 1075 Battle of Langensalza against the insurgents. However, after the joint victory, Rudolf became estranged to the king and rumours occurred that he was involved in adversarial conspiracies. Empress Agnes repeatedly had to arbitrate between the parties.

Finally when the Investiture Controversy broke out and King Henry was excommunicated by Pope Gregory VII in February 1076, Duke Rudolf met with Berthold, Welf and several other princes in Trebur in order to decide on a course of action and to arrange a new election. Henry, observing the proceedings from his camp in Oppenheim on the other side of the Rhine, had to face a massive loss of support among the German nobles and realized that he had to achieve the lifting of his ban. Pope Gregory agreed to meet with the princes at Augsburg in February 1077.

=== Anti-king ===
Already in January, Henry hastened to see the pope on his way to the Empire from Rome. Duke Rudolf attempted to have the Alpine passes closed, but the king through wintry weather made his Walk to Canossa, where Gregory, fearing an armed attack by Henry's forces, had found refuge with Matilda of Tuscany. By doing penance, Henry managed to achieve absolution, buying time at the price of his reputation and secular authority. The rebels continued with their plans. Rudolf was elected anti-king on 15 March 1077 at the Kaiserpfalz in Forchheim, where already Louis the Child and Conrad I of Germany had been crowned. The first anti-king in the history of the Empire, he promised to respect the investiture solely according to canon law, as well as the concept of the elective monarchy. Further claims raised by the princes were rejected as simony by the attendant papal legates.

The men who elected Rudolf were Archbishops Siegfried I of Mainz, Werner of Magdeburg and Gebhard of Salzburg; Bishops Burchard II of Halberstadt, Altmann of Passau, Adalbert II of Worms and Adalbero of Würzburg; Dukes Berthold II of Carinthia, Welf I of Bavaria and Rudolf himself; and Otto of Northeim, former duke of Bavaria. Duke Magnus of Saxony and Margrave Udo II of Stade may also have taken part. Rudolf proceeded to Mainz, where on 25 May he was crowned by Archbishop Siegfried I, but soon after was forced to flee to Saxony, when the Mainz citizens revolted. This presented a problem, since the Saxon duchy was cut off from his Swabian homelands by the king's Salian territory. Moreover, the pope avoided taking sides and adopted a waiting attitude. Rudolf was accused of greed, treason and usurpation by Henry's liensmen, while his own support crumbled.

=== Later life ===
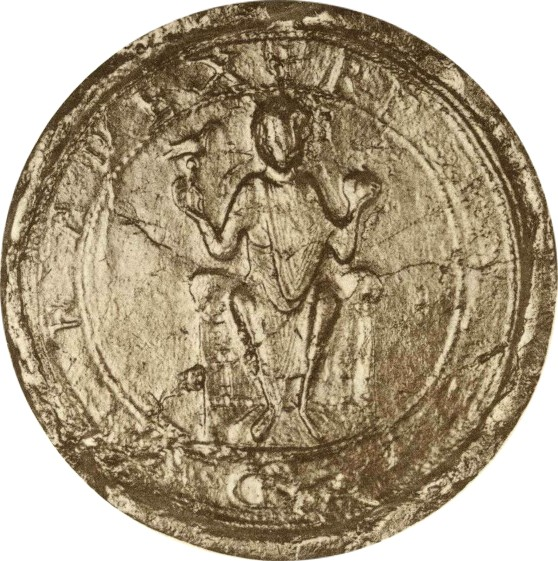
Royal seal of Rudolf, 1079

Rudolf gave Swabia to his son Berthold and attempted to rectify his situation by stalking Henry's forces near Würzburg, but to little effect. Meanwhile, he was deprived of Swabia by the Hoftag diet at Ulm in May, and the king gave the duchy to Frederick of Stauf, the first Hohenstaufen ruler.

The next year Henry waged a successful campaign to Bavaria, while Pope Gregory rejected excommunicating Rudolf. The Battle of Mellrichstadt on 7 August 1078 proved indecisive; though the opposition forces under Otto of Nordheim were victorious, the troops of Berthold and Welf were stuck in a peasants' revolt. Rudolf found it difficult to convince the Saxons to fight beyond their borders; they viewed him as a southerner and distrusted him. He was also frustrated by the apparent reluctance of the pope to recognize his cause. In order to gain and maintain supporters, he was forced to grant large parts of the crown lands, as well as those of the church, to his followers. Nevertheless, things seemed to be improving in 1080. The battle of Flarchheim (27 January 1080) went well in his favor. On 7 March, the pope excommunicated Henry again and recognized Rudolf as king.

Emboldened, Rudolf's forces met Henry's at the White Elster river in the Battle of Elster. The battle, which took place on 14 October 1080, would have been a huge victory for the anti-royalists. However, Rudolf lost his right hand in the battle and was mortally wounded in the abdomen. He withdrew to nearby Merseburg, where he died the next day and was buried. The majority of the support for the rebellion against Henry IV soon evaporated, but the struggle continued on in effect into 1085, with a final flare up in 1088 under Rudolph's successor, the second anti-king, Herman of Luxembourg.

== Issue ==
With his second wife, Adelaide, Rudolf had at least four (and perhaps five) children:

- Agnes of Rheinfelden, married Berthold II of Zähringen
- Adelaide of Rheinfelden, married King Ladislaus I of Hungary
- Bertha of Rheinfelden, Countess of Kellmünz, married Ulrich X, Count of Bregenz
- Otto (died young)
- Berthold of Rheinfelden (the identity of Berthold's mother is disputed)

== Sources ==
- Robinson, Ian Stuart (2002). Bertholds und Bernolds Chroniken. Lateinisch und deutsch (in German). Darmstadt: Wiss. Buchgesellschaft. pp. 35–277. ISBN 3-534-01428-6.
- H. Bresslau and P. Kehr, eds., Die Urkunden Heinrichs III, MGH Diplomata 5 (Berlin, 1931).
- Vita Heinrici IV. imperatoris, ed., W. Eberhard, MGH Script. rer. Germ. 58 (Hannover and Leipzig, 1899).
- Liber de unitate ecclesiae conservanda in W. Schwenenbecher, ed., MGH Libelli, 2 (Hannover, 1892), pp. 184–284.

Rudolf of Rheinfelden Born: c. 1025 Died: 15 October 1080
Preceded by Otto III	Duke of Swabia; 1057–1079	Succeeded by Berthold I
