= Berthold II of Swabia =

Duke of Swabia from 1092 to 1098

Berthold II
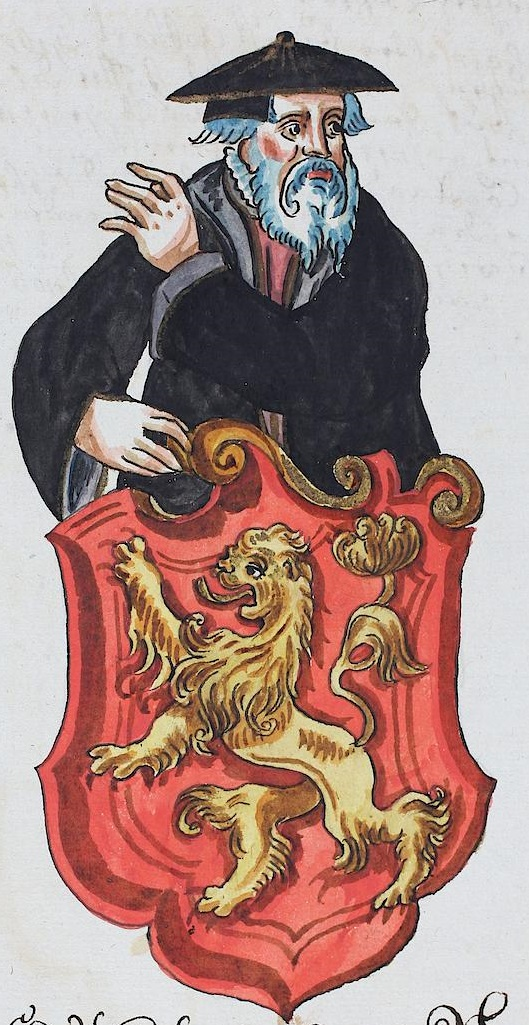

Duke of Swabia
- Reign: 1092–1098
- Predecessor: Berthold I
- Successor: Frederick I
- Born: c. 1050
- Died: 12 April 1111
- Noble family: House of Zähringen
- Spouse: Agnes of Rheinfelden
- Issue: Berthold III, Duke of Zähringen; Conrad I, Duke of Zähringen
- Father: Berthold I of Zähringen
- Mother: Richwara

Berthold II (c. 1050 – 12 April 1111), also known as Berchtold II, was the Duke of Swabia from 1092 to 1098. After he conceded the Duchy of Swabia to the Staufer in 1098, the title of "Duke of Zähringen" was created for him, in use from c. 1100 and continued by his successors until 1218.

== Life and family ==
Berthold was a younger son of Berthold I of Zähringen, and he initially supported Rudolf of Rheinfelden against King Henry IV. In 1077, both the Zähringer and Rheinfeldener were relieved of their titles and possessions by the king. Berthold I of Zähringen died in 1078 and his son Berthold inherited his claims, including a claim to the Duchy of Swabia. In 1079, Berthold married Agnes of Rheinfelden, Rudolf's daughter.

In the following years, he became a strong supporter of Rudolf's eldest son, Berthold of Rheinfelden, against the king. He was also at odds with Frederick of Stauf and the bishops of Basel and Strasbourg. However, when the region quieted down in the late 1080s, Berthold is found as a witness to an exchange of land involving the bishop of Basel (1087).

Tensions rose again in 1090, when Berthold of Rheinfelden died. At that point, Berthold of Zähringen asserted his claims to the Rheinfeldener inheritance in Burgundy, but not their titles, which went to Berthold of Rheinfelden's younger brother, Otto von Wetter(au)-Rheinfelden. He also placed a claim on the Duchy of Swabia. Supported by the Welfs and the Papacy, he was elected duke in opposition to Frederick in 1092. In that same year, he was chosen as Duke of Carinthia and Margrave of Verona (like his father) by those who opposed Duke Henry V. Berthold, also like his father, never held any real power in Carinthia.

In 1093, Berthold and Welf IV signed a "peace oath" at Ulm. At first only valid in Swabia, it was soon extended to Bavaria and strengthened the opposition to the emperor in southern Germany. Around 1098, Berthold and Frederick came to terms, whereby Frederick kept Swabia, but Berthold was given the Reichsvogtei (or imperial estates, depending on the source) of Zürich and allowed to keep a ducal title. By this step, the relationship between the Zähringer and Henry IV improved. In 1105, Berthold was the closest ally of Henry's son, Henry V, who rebelled against his father.

Beginning in 1090, Berthold extended his power into the Breisgau so that the Zähringer territory extracted itself from the influence of the Swabian duke. In 1091, he abandoned Zähringen Castle as his main residence in favour of the newly built Freiburg Castle.

Berthold was the first of the Zähringer to hold the title of "Duke of Zähringen" (from around 1100). He established his rule with the foundation of monasteries and other settlements in the Black Forest. His territory was small, and he had little opportunity for expansion. His ducal title was described by Otto of Freising as one of the first "empty titles" in medieval Germany – a title signifying little in the way of governmental or territorial significance. His was not a political or military office, nor a tribal or territorial command. Rather, his ducal title was a mere dignity, and his estates were family possessions.

In 1093, he founded the Benedictine monastery of Saint Peter, which became the family mausoleum. The monasteries that he founded were usually reformed monasteries, which were hostile to the emperor. With the displacement of the counts of Hohenburg from the region of the Black Forest, Berthold successfully turned it into his centre of power.

By the end of his life, Berthold's estates amounted to a justification of his grandiose title. He was succeeded as Duke of Zähringen in 1111 by his son Berthold III. His youngest son, Conrad, succeeded Berthold III in 1122. Among his other children, his daughter Agnes married William II (the German), Count of Burgundy(1085–1125).

== Sources ==
- Barraclough, Geoffrey, ed. (1961). Medieval Germany, 911-1250. Vol. II:Essays. Basil Blackwell.

Berthold II of Swabia House of Zähringen Born: c. 1050 Died: 12 April 1111
Preceded by Berthold I	Duke of Swabia; 1092–1098	Succeeded by Frederick I
Preceded by Title created	Duke of Zähringen c. 1100–1111	Succeeded by Berthold III
