= Berthold I of Swabia =

Eleventh-century German noble

Berthold of Rheinfelden
- Duke of Swabia
- Reign: 1079-18 May 1090
- Born: c. 1060
- Died: 18 May 1090
- Buried: Saint Blaise Abbey
- Father: Rudolf of Rheinfelden
- Mother: Matilda of Germany or Adelaide of Savoy

Berthold I (c. 1060 – 18 May 1090), better known as Berthold of Rheinfelden (German: Berthold von Rheinfelden), was the Duke of Swabia from 1079 until his death.

== Life ==
Berthold was the eldest son of Rudolf of Rheinfelden, duke of Swabia and German anti-king from 1077 to 1079 in opposition to Henry IV of Germany. The identity of Berthold's mother is disputed. She is sometimes said to be Rudolf's first wife, Matilda of Germany (sister of Henry IV), and sometimes said to be Rudolf's second wife, Adelaide of Savoy (if this were the case, then Berthold must have been born after c.1062), and sometimes said to be Rudolf's son by another unknown wife.

After the death of Rudolf's second wife Adelaide in 1079, Rudolf needed a new supervisor of the southern German resistance, since he was himself confined to Saxony and cut off from his allies in Swabia. Rudolf therefore made his son Berthold duke of Swabia. Henry, however, appointed Frederick of Stauf, who had lands strategically located much to his advantage.

Throughout the civil war against Henry IV, Swabia was thrown into chaos. In 1084, Berthold was besieged by supporters of Henry IV. Although he had a larger power base, he was of lower rank. He eventually left the fight to Berthold, the husband of his sister Agnes, and to Welf IV. Berthold I died without descendants in 1090 and was buried in the monastery of Saint Blaise. He was succeeded as duke of Swabia by his brother-in-law, subsequently known as Berthold II.

| Preceded by Rudolf | Duke of Swabia; 1079–1090 | Succeeded by Berthold II |
