= Bertha of Rheinfelden =

Countess of Bregenz (c.1065-c.1133)

- Born: c. 1065
- Died: c. 1133
- Noble family: Rheinfelden
- Spouse: Ulrich X of Bregenz
- Issue: Rudolf I, Count of Bregenz; Adelaide of Bregenz; Ulrich of Bregenz; Henry of Kellmünz
- Father: Rudolf of Rheinfelden
- Mother: Adelaide of Savoy

Bertha of Rheinfelden (also Bertha of Bregenz) (born c. 1065; d. after 1128), countess of Kellmünz, was the daughter of Rudolf of Rheinfelden and wife of Ulrich X of Bregenz.

== Life ==
Bertha was the daughter of Rudolf of Rheinfelden and Adelaide of Savoy (daughter of Adelaide of Turin). Her sister, Adelaide of Rheinfelden, was married to Ladislaus I of Hungary. Bertha’s husband was Ulrich X, count of Bregenz (d. 1097). According to the Chronicle of Petershausen, Ulrich was betrothed to a daughter of Count Werner of Habsburg, but secretly arranged to marry Bertha instead.

Bertha inherited property in the Schluchsee region. She possessed three (of the seven) secular benefices of the monastery of Marchtal. (This property, which originally belonged to Herman II of Swabia, probably came into the possession of Bertha’s father, Rudolf, through his first marriage to Matilda of Germany, daughter of Emperor Henry III and Empress Agnes.) Bertha also inherited the church of Sargans, which she donated to the monastery of Mehrerau, which she and her husband, Ulrich, re-founded, c.1097. In addition to Mehrerau, Bertha was also a patron (benefactrix) of the monastery of Isny. Through her husband, Ulrich, Bertha was also associated with the monastery of Petershausen. After her Ulrich’s death in a hunting accident in 1097, Bertha and her sons (Rudolf and Ulrich XI) restored property in Bigenhausen to Petershausen for the sake of her husband's soul. And around 1122 Bertha interceded on behalf of lay brothers from Petershausen who had violently attacked the monastery’s cellarer. Bertha’s intervention ensured that they were received back into the monastery.

After Ulrich X’s death, his dynasty (the house of Bregenz) came into conflict with the Welf and Kirchberg dynasties over property in Linzgau, Alpgau and Upper Raetia. According to one account, Bertha ‘fought manfully’ (virilter pugnavit) at the Battle of Jedesheim (January 1108 or 1109), at which the forces of Rudolf of Bregenz were defeated by Count Hartmann of Kirchberg.

Bertha died sometime after 1128 and was buried at the abbey of Mehrerau.

== Children ==
With Ulrich, Bertha had the following children:

- Adelaide (d.28 June 1168), married Ulrich, count of Ramsperg and Hegau (d.c.1155)
- Rudolf I, Count of Bregenz
- Ulrich
- Henry of Kellmünz (d. 1128)
