= Gebhard of Constance =

Bishop of Constance from 979 to 995

Saint Gebhard of Constance
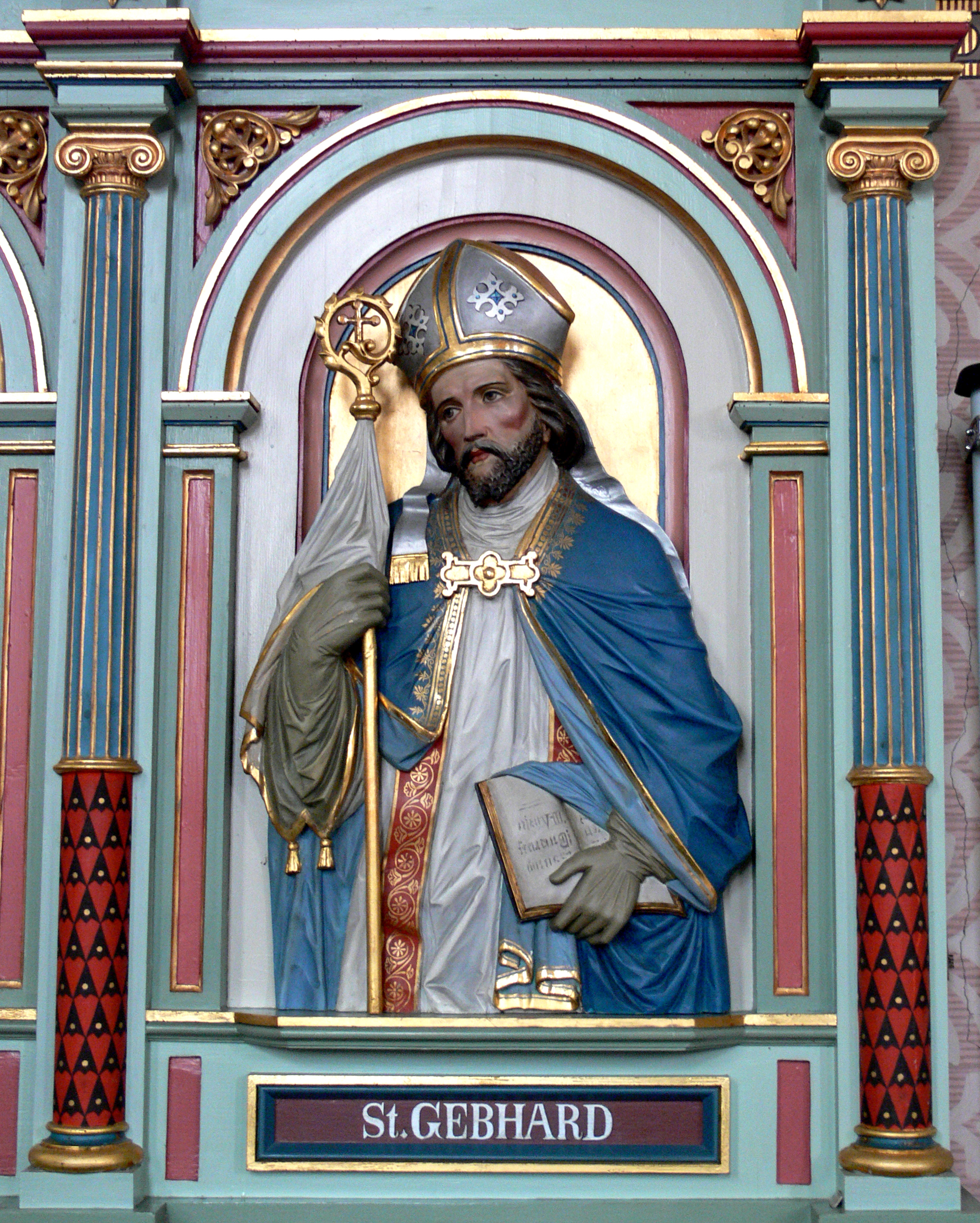
- St. Gebhard
- Born: 949; Austria
- Died: 995 (aged 45–46)
- Venerated in: Roman Catholic Church; Eastern Orthodox Church
- Feast: 27 August
- Attributes: bishop reaching his staff to a lame man; bishop with a skull wearing a papal tiara near him or on a book; bishop with the Virgin Mary appearing to him
- Patronage: Constance; Vorarlberg

Gebhard of Constance (Latin: Gebhardus Constantiensis; German: Gebhard von Konstanz; 949 – 995 AD) was a bishop of Constance from 979 until 995. He founded the Benedictine abbey of Petershausen in 983. Regarded as a Christian saint, his feast day is 27 August.

== Life ==
Gebhard was born about 949, at Hohenbregenz Castle. He was the youngest son of Count Ulrich of Bregenz. His mother died during the birth. Gebhard was educated in Constance under his uncle, Bishop Conrad at the cathedral school. In 979, Holy Roman Emperor Otto II appointed him Bishop of Constance. The diocese was suffragan to the Archdiocese of Mainz. He was consecrated in Mainz Cathedral.

Gebhard was concerned with monastic reform, and distinguished himself by his care for the poor. In 983 he founded on the northern shore of the Rhine river opposite to the episcopal residence, a Benedictine abbey dedicated to Pope Gregory the Great. It later came to be called Petershausen Abbey.

In 990, Bishop Gebhard initiated a program on the episcopal estate to encourage the serfs to learn crafts, the better to support themselves.

After this he called his serfs together and chose the best among them and declared that they should be cooks and millers, victuallers and fullers, cobblers and gardeners, carpenters and masters of every craft, and he decreed that, on the day on which they took care of the brethren, they should be refreshed with the bread of the brethren, for the laborer is worthy of his hire. Moreover in order that they might work for their masters with a good will he added a gift of this kind, namely, that, if any of them, or of their successors, who is of their stock, should die, their goods should not be confiscated but their heirs might take the whole of the inheritance: but if any one of another family should succeed, he shall be deprived of this gift.

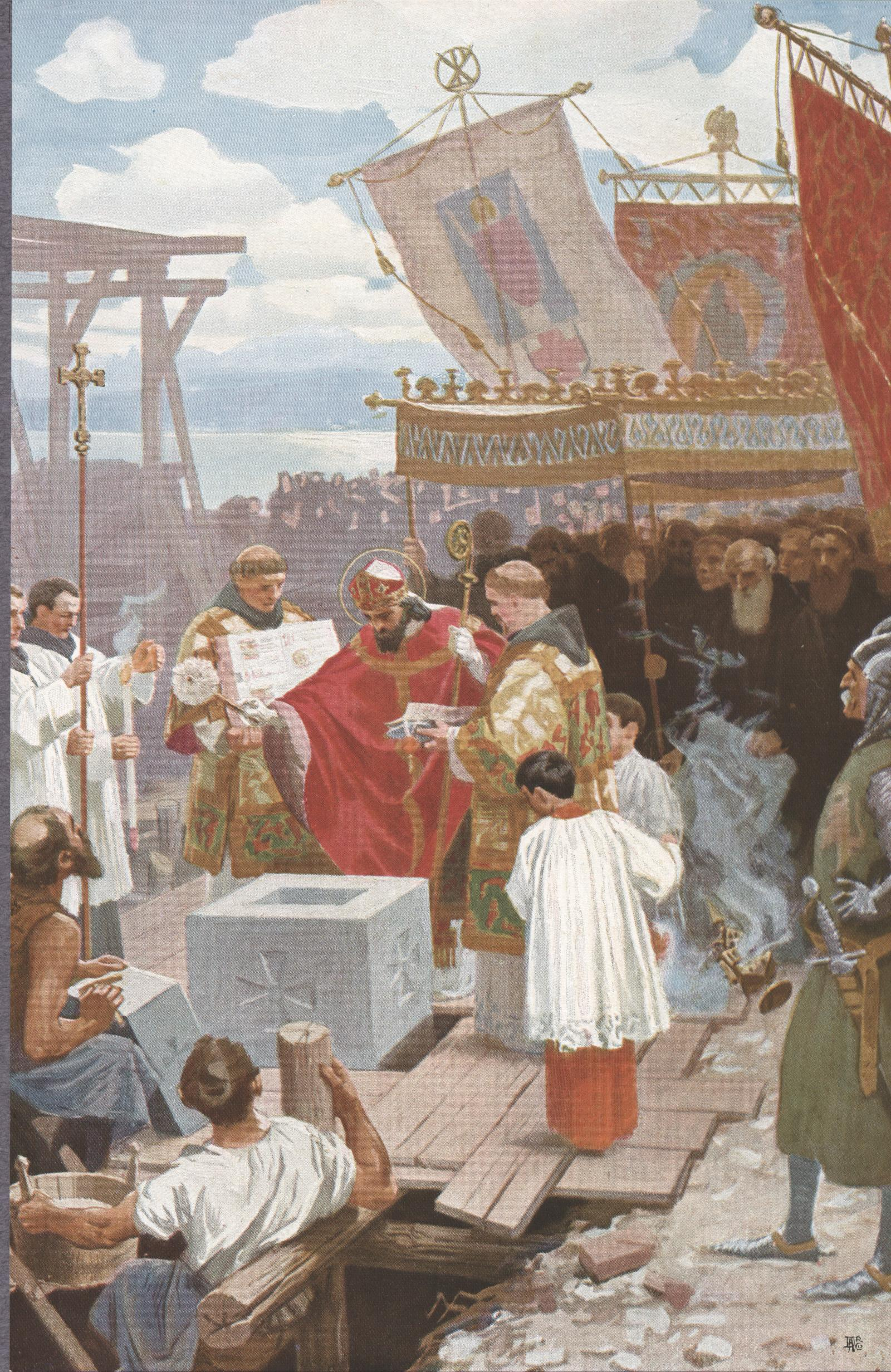
Gebhard founding Petershausen

== Veneration ==
Gebhard began to be honoured as a saint soon after his death, and became patron of the city of Constance. In 1134 Bishop Ulrich II of Constance sanctioned his veneration.

Gebhard is commemorated on 27 August in the archdiocese of Freiburg, and in the diocese of Rottenburg-Stuttgart on 26 November together with St. Konrad.

Hohenbregenz Castle is now divided into two parts. The lower portion contains the Gerbhardsberg Castle Restaurant, named after St. Gebhard. The upper castle houses the pilgrimage church of St Gebhard and St George. Pilgrimages to the Gebhardsberg near Bregenz are documented from 1670. The relics of St. Gebhard lie at Petershausen, with the exception of an arm given by the abbey to the castle chapel in 1821.

In 1949, the Republic of Austria issued a stamp displaying St. Gebhard.

=== Patronage ===
Gebhard is the patron saint of the diocese of Feldkirch and the church of St. Gebhard (Constance), and is invoked against diseases of the neck.

=== Iconography ===
Gebhard von Konstanz is portrayed as a bishop giving his staff to a lame man.
