= Ulrich X of Bregenz =

Count of Bregenz from 1079 to 1097

- Born: c. 1060
- Died: 1097; Prättigau
- Buried: Mehrerau Abbey
- Noble family: Udalriching / House of Bregenz
- Spouse: Bertha of Rheinfelden
- Issue: Rudolf I, Count of Bregenz; Ulrich XI of Bregenz; Adelaide of Bregenz; Henry of Kellmünz
- Father: Ulrich IX of Bregenz

Ulrich X (also called Ulric or Udalrich) (c. 1060 –1097) was Count of Bregenz from 1079 to his death in 1097.

== Life ==
Ulrich X was the son of Ulrich IX of Bregenz (d. 1079). In late 1080 or early 1081 Ulrich married Bertha of Rheinfelden, daughter of Rudolf of Rheinfelden. When he met Bertha, Ulrich was already betrothed to another woman, a daughter of Count Werner of Habsburg (d. 1096). Yet he and Bertha began an affair, and when her relatives found out, they compelled Ulrich to marry Bertha.

During the Investiture Contest, Ulrich was on the papal side, allied with Rudolf of Rheinfelden and Welf I, Duke of Bavaria. With the permission of Pope Gregory VII He founded the abbey of Mehrerau in Bregenz. Ulrich was also engaged in a long-running dispute with the monastery of Petershausen over property in Bigenhausen which he had appropriated from the monks.

In 1097 Ulrich died while on a hunting trip in Prättigau. Members of the hunting party began rolling stones down a hill and Ulrich, in a show of bravado, tried and failed to jump one of the stones. He died from the injuries he sustained and his body was taken back to Bregenz for burial.

== Children ==
With Bertha, Ulrich X had the following children:

- Rudolf I, Count of Bregenz
- Ulrich XI
- Henry of Kellmünz (d. 1128)
- Adelaide (d.28 June 1168), married Ulrich, count of Ramsperg and Hegau (d.c.1155)
