= Franciscus Janssens =

The Reverend Lord Franciscus Janssens OCist
- Abbas Generalis Cisterciensis
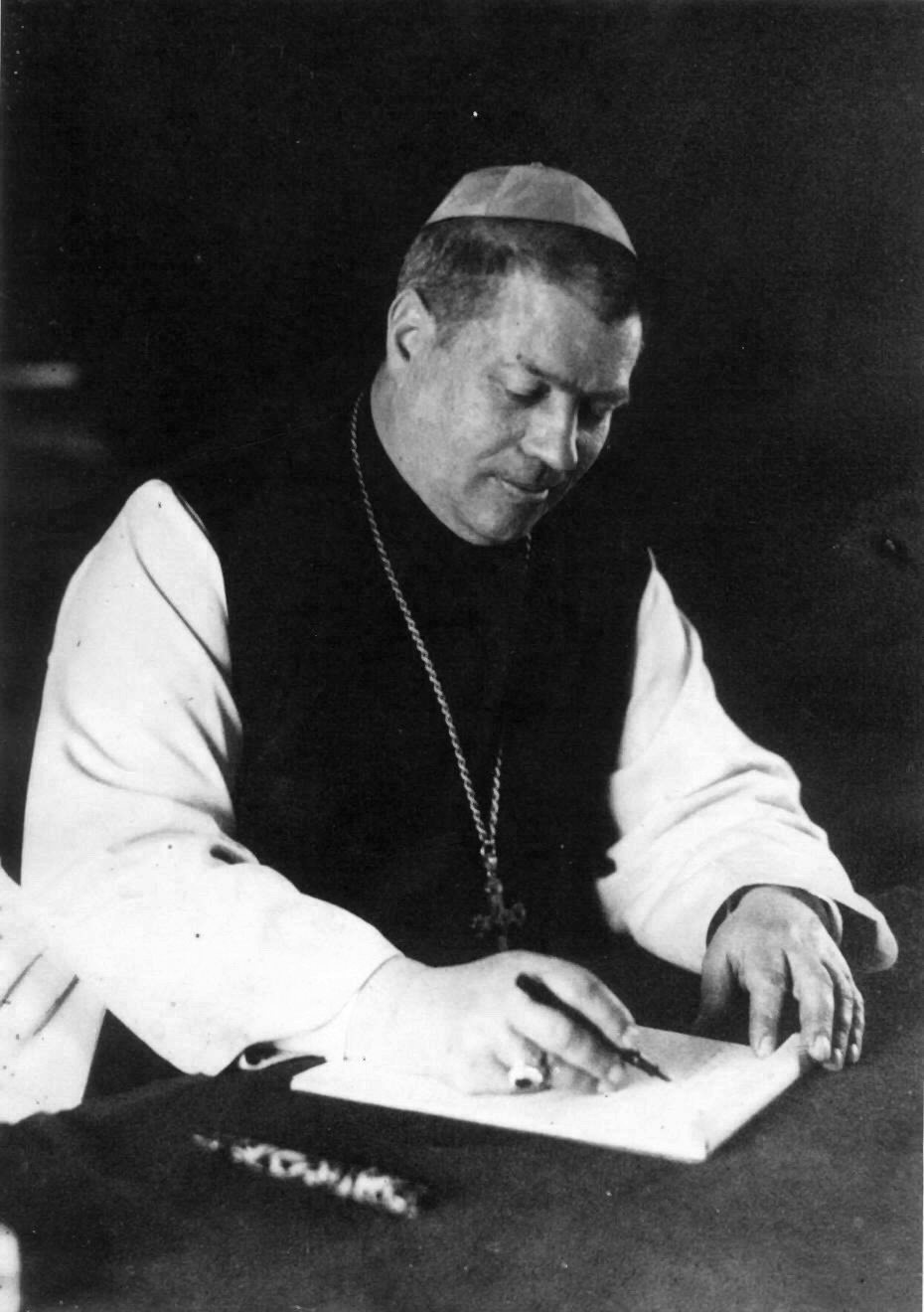
- Dom Franciscus Janssens
- Church: Roman Catholic
- Predecessor: Cassian Haid
- Successor: Edmondus Bernardini
- Other post: Abbot of Notre Dame du Pont-Colbert.

Orders
- Ordination: 1857

Personal details
- Born: 20 February 1881 Tilburg, Netherlands
- Died: 23 April 1950 (aged 69) Hilversum, Netherlands

Franciscus Janssens OCist (born Albert Henri Lucien; 20 February 1881 – 23 April 1950) was the 76th General Abbot of the Common Observance between 1927 and 1936.

== Career ==
He entered in 1901 to Achel Abbey, a monastery of the Strict Observance, and made his profession in 1904. In 1924 he became elected Abbot of Pont-Colbert, after the death of abbot Maréchal and the same year ordained by Mgr Diepen and abbot Thomas Schoen. In 1927 he was elected General Abbot of the Common Observance, and died in 1950.
