= Wettingen Abbey =

Cistercian monastery in Aargau, Switzerland

Coordinates: 47°27′27″N 8°19′02″E

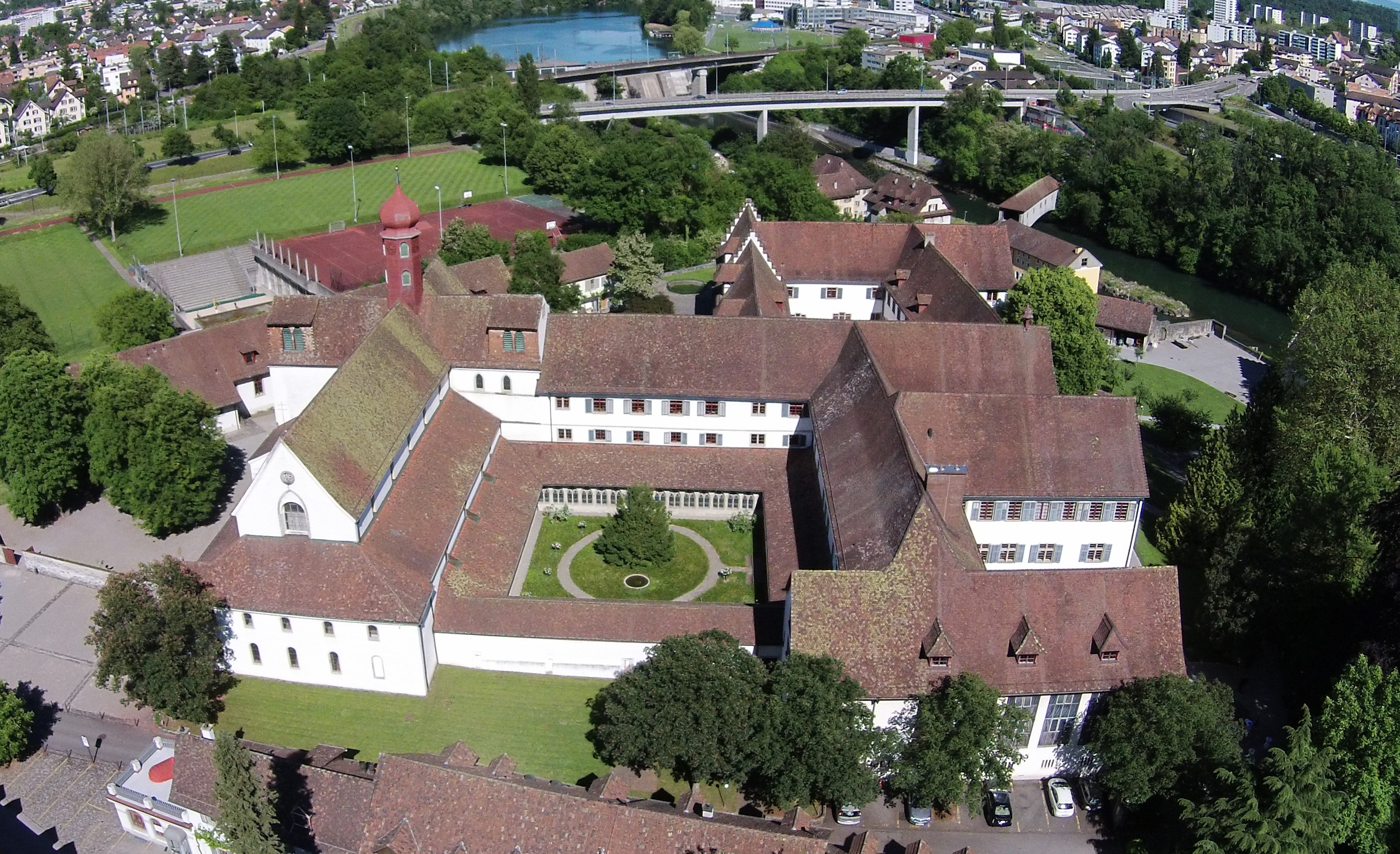

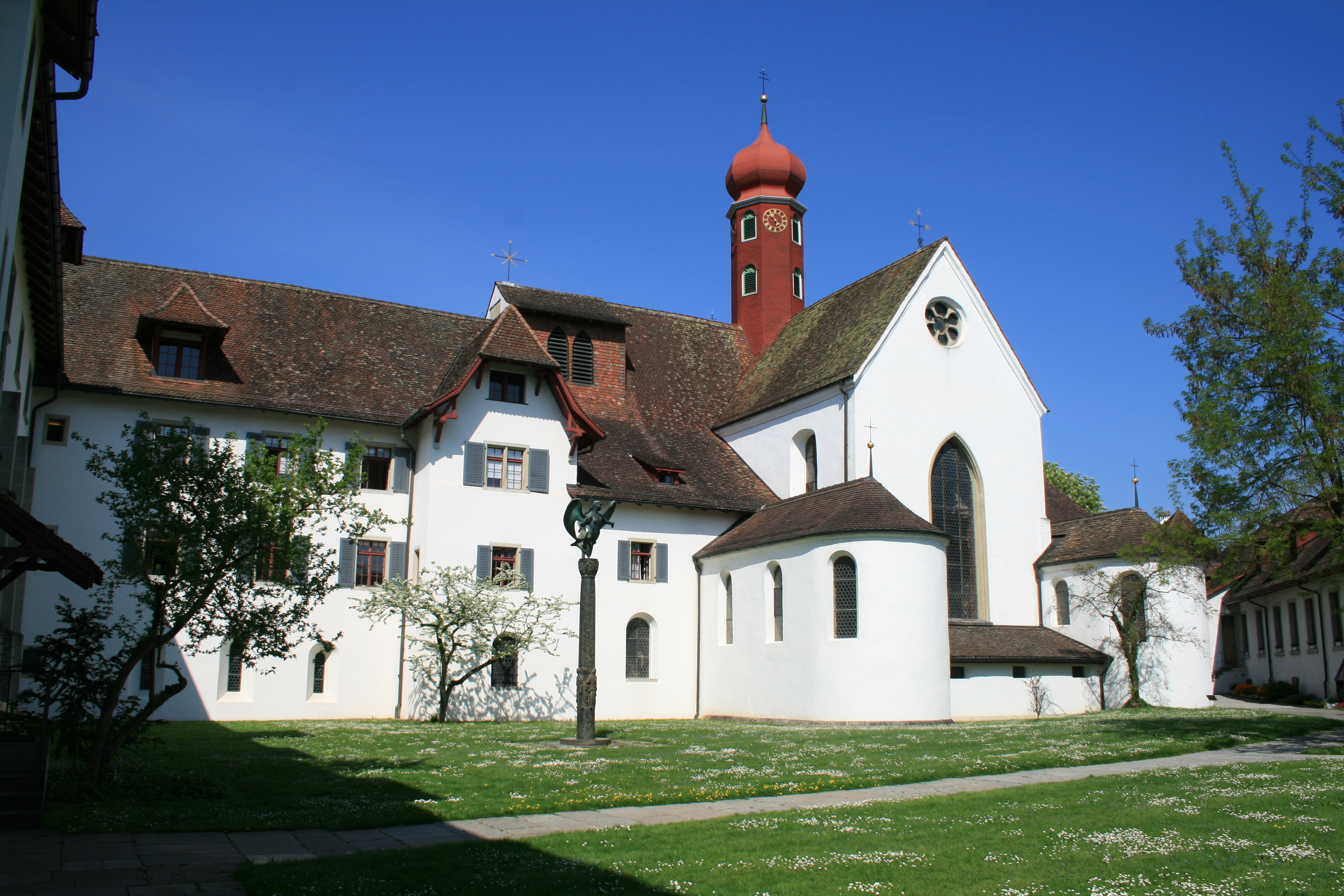
Church

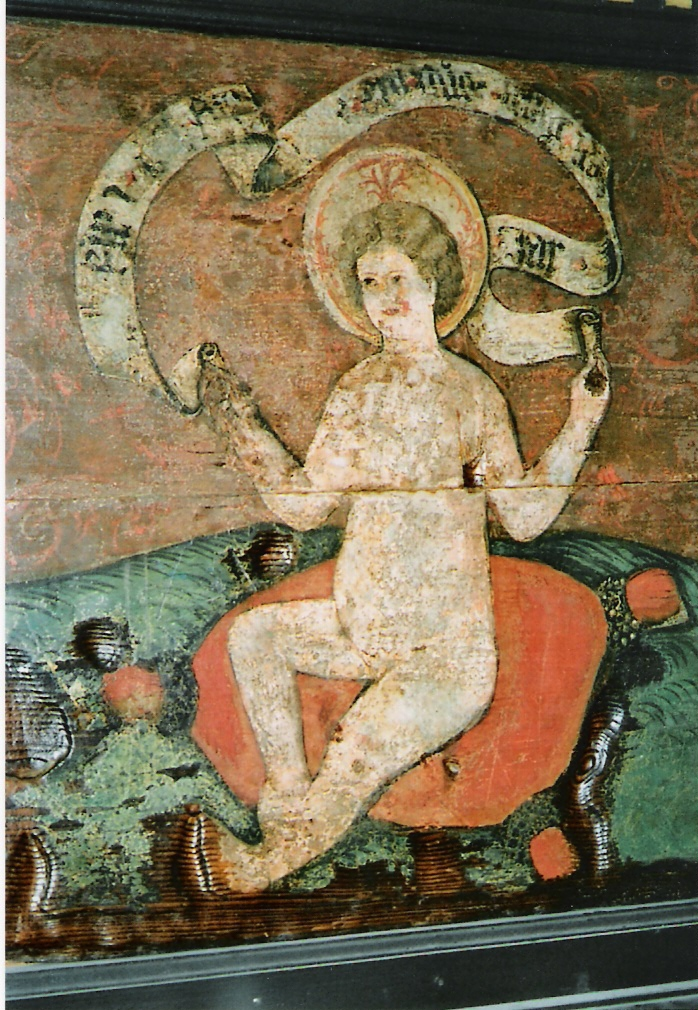
Infant Jesus of Wettingen

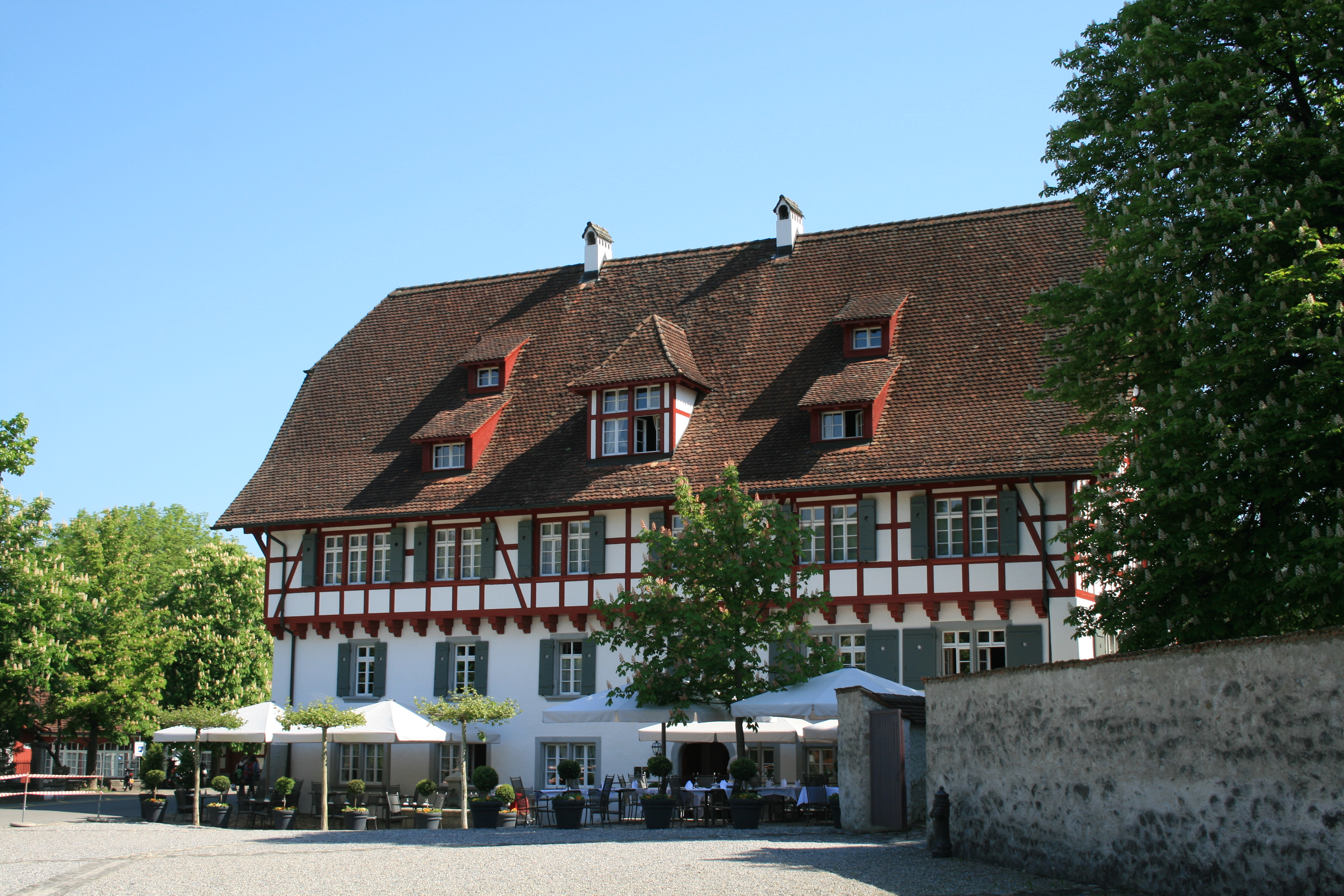
Restaurant

Wettingen Abbey (Kloster Wettingen) was a Cistercian monastery in Wettingen in the Swiss canton of Aargau. It was founded in 1227 and dissolved during the secularisation of 1841, but re-founded at Mehrerau in Austria in 1854. The buildings are listed as a heritage site of national significance.

== History ==
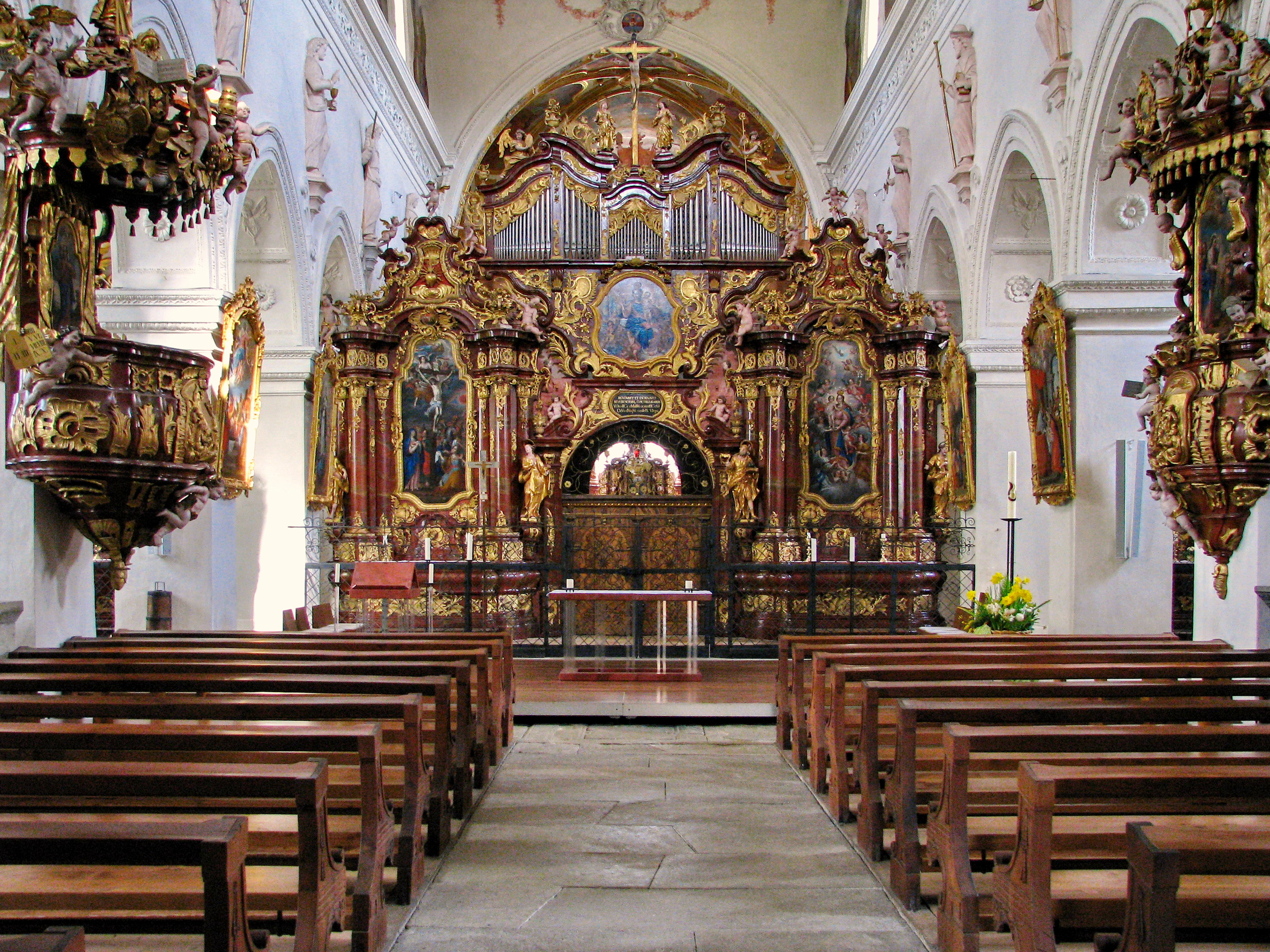
Nave of the abbey church at Wettingen

Count Heinrich II of Rapperswil bought lands in Wettingen sometime after 1220, and gave it the name Wettingen, believed to be named after his wife's family von Wetterau. He had married in 1220 to Mechtidis von Wetter, sister of Count Lutold I von Wetter. And as well as the advowson of the village church. After being miraculously saved from shipwreck during the crusades, he gave his possessions in Wettingen to Salem Abbey, a Cistercian house in the north of the region around the Bodensee. The piece of land for the construction of the new buildings was given by the nunnery at Schänis. Eberhard of Rohrdorf, abbot of Salem, dispatched twelve monks to create a new foundation and some lay-brothers under Konrad, the abbot-designate, who had previously been Eberhard's deputy.

On 14 October 1227, the monks began building the monastery, called Stella Maris (Latin: "Star of the sea"). In memory of their generous founder they also adopted the motto Non mergor (Latin for I do not sink). From the beginning the abbey was able to add to its possessions: in Uri, in Zürich, in Riehen and above all in the valley of the Limmat in the area round Wettingen. In the Limmat Valley the abbey possessed the authority of the low justice. The "Vögte" (lords protector) were the Habsburgs until 1415, and after that the Old Swiss Confederacy.

In the early 16th century, however, the abbey was greatly weakened by financial difficulties. On 11 April 1507, (Divine Mercy Sunday) a fire destroyed parts of the monastery. The Infant Jesus of Wettingen, a painting on wood, miraculously escaped the devastating fire. In 1529 most of the monks converted to the reformed faith. After the Second War of Kappel of 1531, the Catholic towns brought about the re-catholicisation of the monastery and until 1564 nominated the abbots themselves.

Under Abbot Peter Schmid (1594 to 1633) the abbey enjoyed a revival. The buildings were restored and extended. In 1604, a school of philosophy and theology was opened, and, in 1671, a printing-press. During the Toggenburg War of 1712 the monks were obliged to flee to central Switzerland for a period. In the turmoil after the French Revolution the abbey afforded shelter to thousands of political and religious refugees from France.

In 1803, the abbey came into the possession of the newly established Canton of Aargau, which initially gave assurances of its continuance, provided it maintained a school. From 1830, however, the government of the canton made ever greater financial demands, until in 1834 it took over the administration of the abbey's assets, imposed a ban on the acceptance of novices and closed down the abbey school. On 13 January 1841, the cantonal parliament of Aargau decreed the dissolution of all monasteries in the Canton, which led to the troubles known as the Aargau Monastic Conflict (see de:Aargauerklosterstreit).

Shortly afterwards, the monks - among them Alberich Zwyssig, composer of the Swiss national anthem, the Swiss Psalm - were forced to leave the abbey. The extensive abbey library was taken over by the Aargau Canton Library. After some years of wandering, the monks settled, on 8 June 1854, in the secularised monastery at Mehrerau in Bregenz in Austria, since known as Wettingen-Mehrerau Abbey.

The empty buildings at Wettingen were placed at the disposal of the teachers' training college. Since 1976 they have been used by the Wettingen Canton School. Catholic services are held every week in the former abbey church, and weddings are also celebrated there.

== 21st century ==
In 2023, the current Abbot is Vinzenz (Rudolf) Wohlwend, O. Cist. He is also responsible for the Cistercian nunneries throughout the country.

The abbey is open to the public and offers tours where visitors can see the monks’ church, the Konversenkirch with Romanesque-Gothic stained glass windows and the cloister garden with trees over 200 years old.
