= Cassian Haid =

The Reverend Lord Cassian Haid OCist
- Abbas Generalis Cisterciensis
- Church: Roman Catholic
- Predecessor: Amadeus de Bie
- Successor: Franciscus Janssens
- Other post: Praes. Congregatio Augiensis.

Personal details
- Born: Josef Haid; 1879
- Died: 1949 (aged 69–70) Mehrerau

Cassian Haid, born Josef, was the 75th General Abbot of the Common observance between 1920–1927.

He entered the Abbey of Mehrerau of the Common Observance in 1897 . In 1917, he became the territorial abbot of the Territorial Abbey of Wettingen-Mehrerau, a position he held until 1949. After his resignation, he was succeeded by dom Franciscus Janssens. In 1938, he fled from the Nazis into Switzerland. He died as abbot in his abbey in 1949 and was succeeded by Heinrich Suso Groner.
