= Rudolf I of Bregenz =

Count of Bregenz

Rudolf I
- Count of Bregenz, Count of Chur, Count of Lower Raetia
- Count: 1097–1160 (Bregenz); 1097–1160 (Chur); 1097–1160 (Lower Raetia)
- Predecessor: Ulrich X, Count of Bregenz
- Born: 1081
- Died: 27 April 1160
- Buried: Mehrerau Abbey
- Family: House of Bregenz
- Spouses: Irmgard of Calw; Wulfhild of Bavaria
- Issue: Markward, Count of Schwarzach; Elisabeth of Bregenz
- Father: Ulrich X, Count of Bregenz
- Mother: Bertha of Rheinfelden

Rudolf I (1081 – 27 April 1160) was Count of Bregenz, Count of Chur and Count of Lower Raetia from 1097 to his death in 1160. He may well be claimed as the first ruler of a united Vorarlberg.

== Life ==
Rudolf I was the son of Ulrich X of Bregenz and Bertha of Rheinfelden (d. after 1128). During his father's death in 1097, the house of Bregenz was at war with the Welfs over the inheritance of the House of Buchhorn (Linzgau, Alpgau and Upper Raetia). His mother encouraged Rudolf to fight for their houses' rights against the Welfs and Kirchberg family, the Welf's allies. Thanks to her efforts, many areas were restored to their family - if only in minimal fashion, the Kirchberg house still retaining most control.

Rudolf gave his brothers, Ulrich XI and Henry, territories for their benefit, since they were robbed by the Welfs and Kirchbergs of their lands. Ulrich received Rheingau and portions of Argengau (east of the Leiblach), while Henry was given his mother's domain, Kellmünz. However, neither survived long. Ulrich died before 1116 and Henry in 1127. Thus Rudolf reassumed their possessions. Now to reform the administration of his domains, he created the new County of Walgau, with its centre on Guggais, near Nüziders. Thanks to this innovation, the region began attracting German workers to work on the nearby mines at the Montafon Valley. Rudolf is known for having built many new towns and churches that exist in Vorarlberg today.

Now it came that it was the later years of Rudolf and he had no heir. He chose Hugo II, Count Palatine of Tübingen, for his daughter, Elisabeth, to wed, as he had shown to be an effective champion of Elisabeth's interests. And these last years he spent with his new son-in-law in relative peace, maintaining the closest relations with Hugo.

At his death on the 27 April 1160, at Pavia, his son-in-law Hugo II, had taken his body to be interred at Ulrich X's foundation of Mehrerau Abbey on the 12 May, where he lies there to this day.

== Family ==
Rudolf had the following known children:

- by his first wife, Irmgard of Calw (d. before 1128), daughter of Adalbert II, Count of Calw:
  - Markward of Schwarzach (d. between 1149 – 1158)
- by his second wife, Wulfhild of Bavaria, daughter of Henry the Black and Wulfhilde of Saxony:
  - Elisabeth of Bregenz married Hugo II, Count Palatine of Tübingen

Rudolf I of Bregenz House of Bregenz Born: 1081 Died: 1160
German royalty
Preceded by Ulrich X	Count of Bregenz; 1097-1160	Succeeded by Hugo II
