= Edmondus Bernardini =

The Reverend Lord Edmondus Bernardini OCist
- Abbas Generalis Cisterciensis
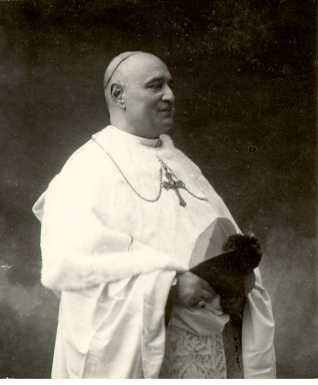
- Dom Edmondo Bernardini
- Church: Roman Catholic
- Predecessor: Franciscus Janssens
- Successor: Matthew Quatember
- Other post: Abbot of Santa Croce in Gerusalemme

Personal details
- Born: Augusto; 1879
- Died: 1955 (aged 75–76) Rome

Dom Edmondus Bernardini, born Augusto was an Italian Abbot of the Common Observance, he became general-abbot of the Common Observance between 1937 and 1950.

== See also ==
- Catholic Church in Italy
