= Kassian Lauterer =

Austrian Roman Catholic priest (1934–2022)

Kassian Lauterer O.Cist.
- Abbott of Wettingen-Mehrerau
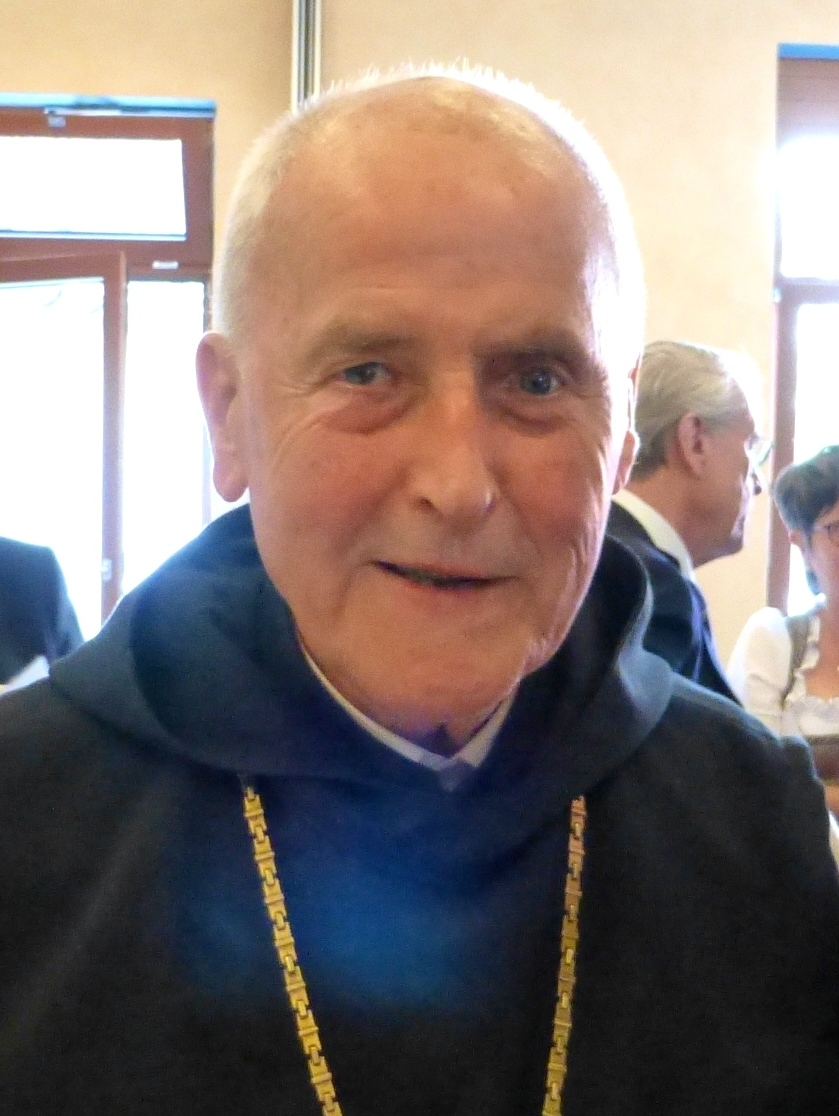
- Church: Catholic Church
- See: Territorial Abbey of Wettingen-Mehrerau
- In office: 31 August 1968 – 29 January 2009
- Predecessor: Heinrich Suso Groner
- Successor: Anselm van der Linde

Orders
- Ordination: 6 August 1957 by Bruno Wechner

Personal details
- Born: 29 January 1934 Bregenz, Vorarlberg, Austria
- Died: 19 October 2022 (aged 88) Bregenz, Vorarlberg, Austria

Kassian (Otto) Lauterer (29 January 1934 – 19 October 2022) was an Austrian Roman Catholic priest.

Lauterer was born in Austria and was ordained to the priesthood for the Cistercian order in 1957. He served as the abbot of the Territorial Abbey of Wettingen-Mehrerau from 1968 until his retirement in 2009.

He died in Bregenz on 19 October 2022, at the age of 88.
