= Anselm van der Linde =

The Reverend Lord Anselm van der Linde OCist
- Abbot Emeritus, Territorial Abbey of Wettingen-Mehrerau
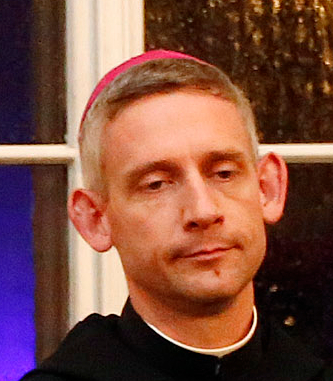
- Anselm van der Linde in November 2014
- Church: Roman Catholic
- Appointed: 2009
- Term ended: 1 August 2018
- Predecessor: Kassian Lauterer
- Other post: Abbas Territorialis Maris Stellae.

Personal details
- Born: Hendrik; 24 September 1970 (age 56) Roodepoort, South Africa
- Education: University of Pretoria

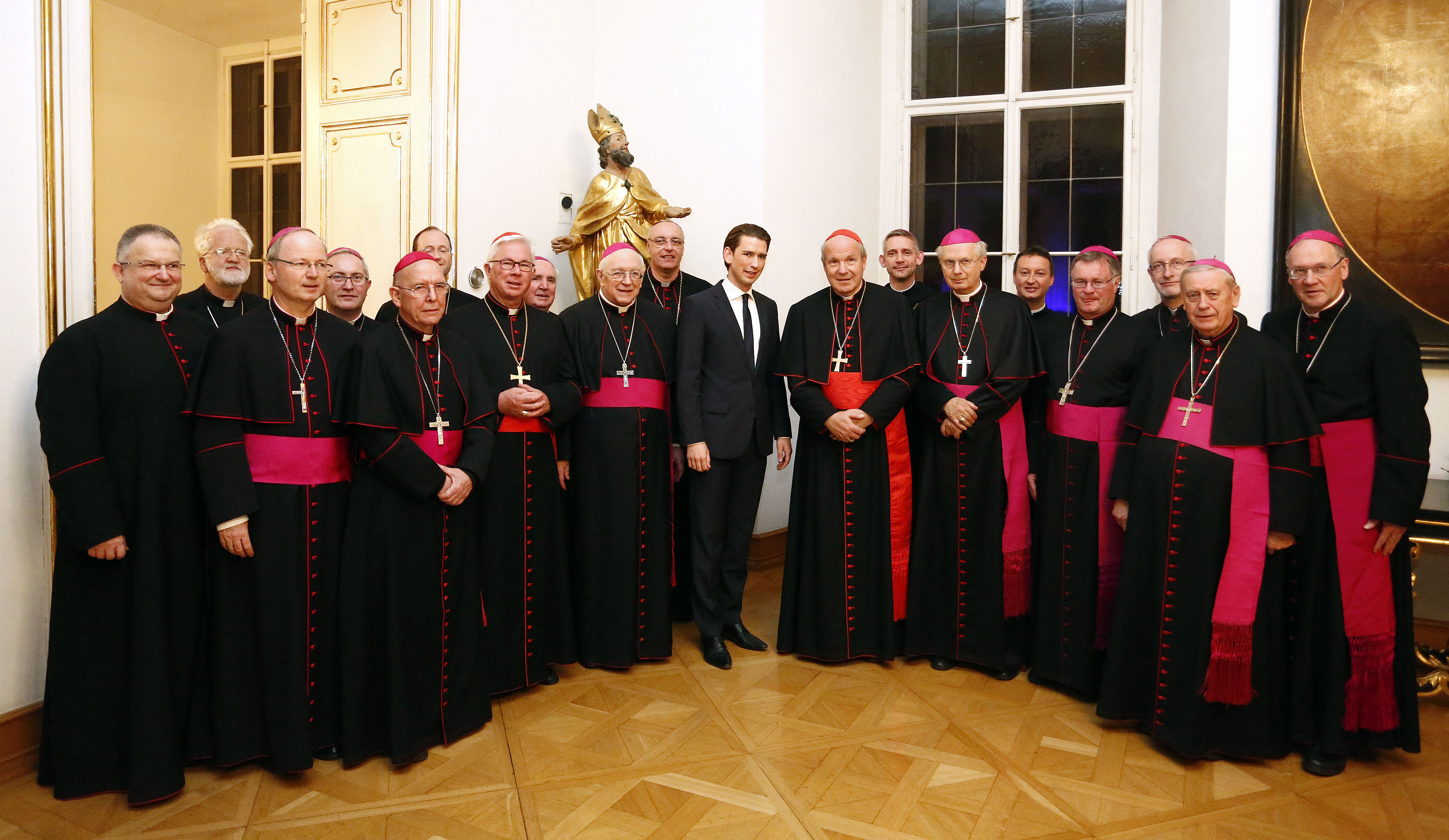
Van der Linde, 7th from the right, stands behind Cardinal Schönborn.

Anselm van der Linde O.Cist. (born 24 September 1970) is a Cistercian abbot of the common observance, an Austrian citizen born in South Africa. He was Abbot of the Territorial Abbey of Wettingen-Mehrerau from 2009 to 2018.

== Career ==
Van der Linde was born in Roodepoort, South Africa, and studied at the University of Pretoria. In 1994 he took vows in the Territorial Abbey of Wettingen-Mehrerau. He became the 53rd abbot of this abbey in 2009, succeeding Kassian Lauterer, and is member of the Austrian Bishops' Conference. His election was approved by Pope Benedict the same year. Van der Linde was ordained and consecrated by Maurus Esteva Alsina. As abbot he was responsible for 21 Cistercian monasteries, both male and female, in Austria, Germany, Switzerland, Italy, the United States, the Czech Republic and Slovenia.

Van der Linde announced his reasons for resigning on 12 July 2018. He said he was exhausted by the effort to recover from the sexual abuse of minors by clerics in the 1960s, including a lengthy legal process that ended in defeat and the conclusion of a financial settlement with two victims of abuse. He cited as well reforms to establish the abbey's economic viability and restore its reputation. Pope Francis accepted his resignation at the age of 47 on 1 August 2018. He was succeeded on an interim basis by an apostolic administrator, Vinzenz Wohlwend, who was named Abbot on 23 November 2018.
