= Petershausen Abbey =

Coordinates: 47°40′05″N 9°10′43″E

Imperial Abbey of Petershausen Reichsstift Petershausen
- early 13th century – 1802
- Coat of arms

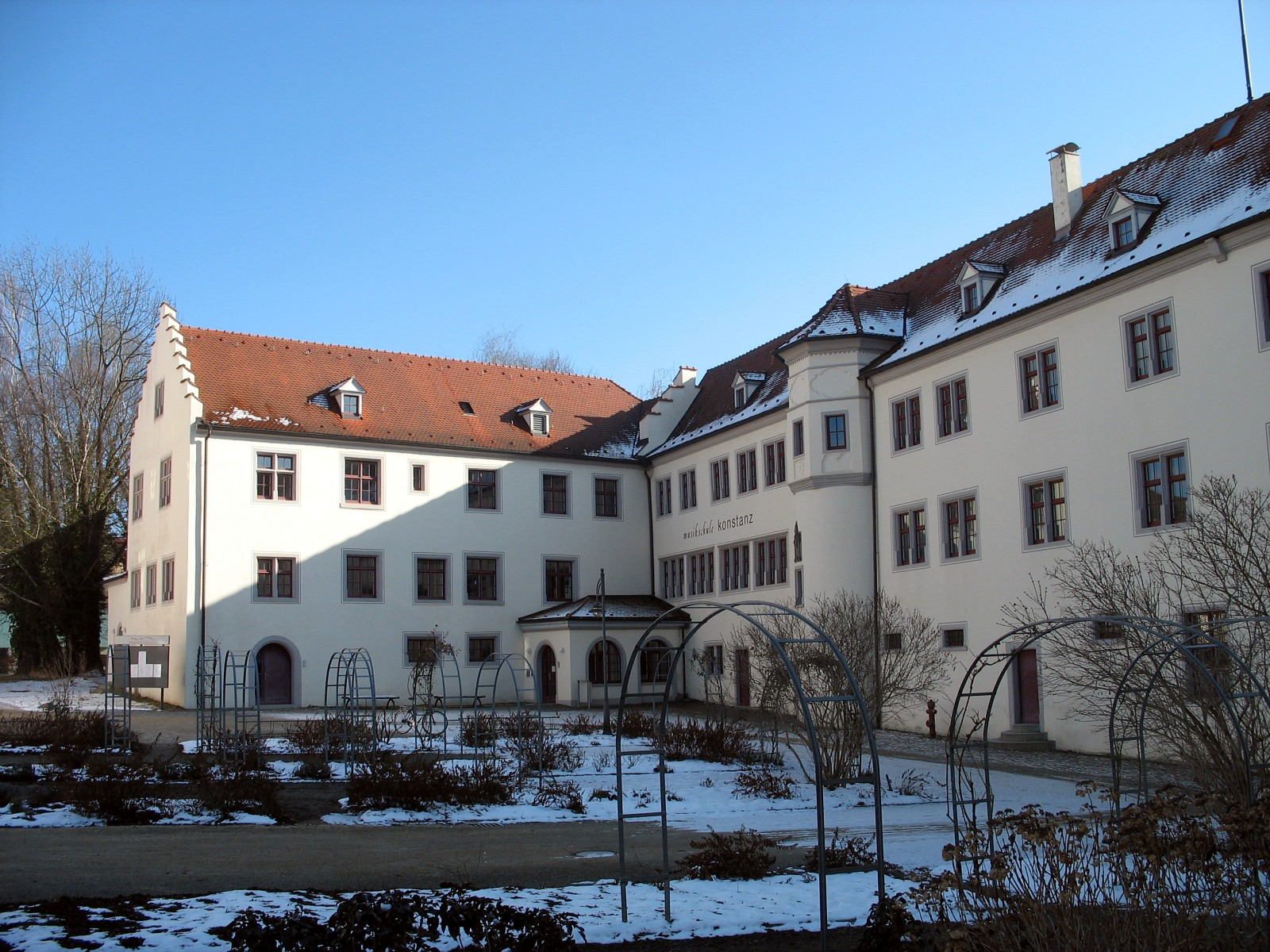
- Status: Imperial Abbey
- Capital: Petershausen
- Government: Principality
- Historical era: Middle Ages
  - Founded: 983
  - Imperial immediacy: early 13th century the 13th century
  - Joined Swabian Imperial Circle: 1500
  - Joined Swabian College of Imp. Abbeys: 1575
  - Secularised to Baden: 1802
Preceded by	Succeeded by
Duchy of Swabia	Margraviate of Baden

Petershausen Abbey (Kloster, Reichskloster, Reichsstift or Reichsabtei Petershausen) was a Benedictine imperial abbey at Petershausen, now a district of Konstanz in Baden-Württemberg, Germany.

== History ==
It was founded as an exempt abbey named after Saint Peter in 983 by Bishop Gebhard of Constance, located on the northern shore of the Rhine river opposite to the episcopal residence at Constance with its cathedral. Gebhard dedicated the monastery church to Pope Gregory the Great and settled the abbey with monks descending from Einsiedeln.

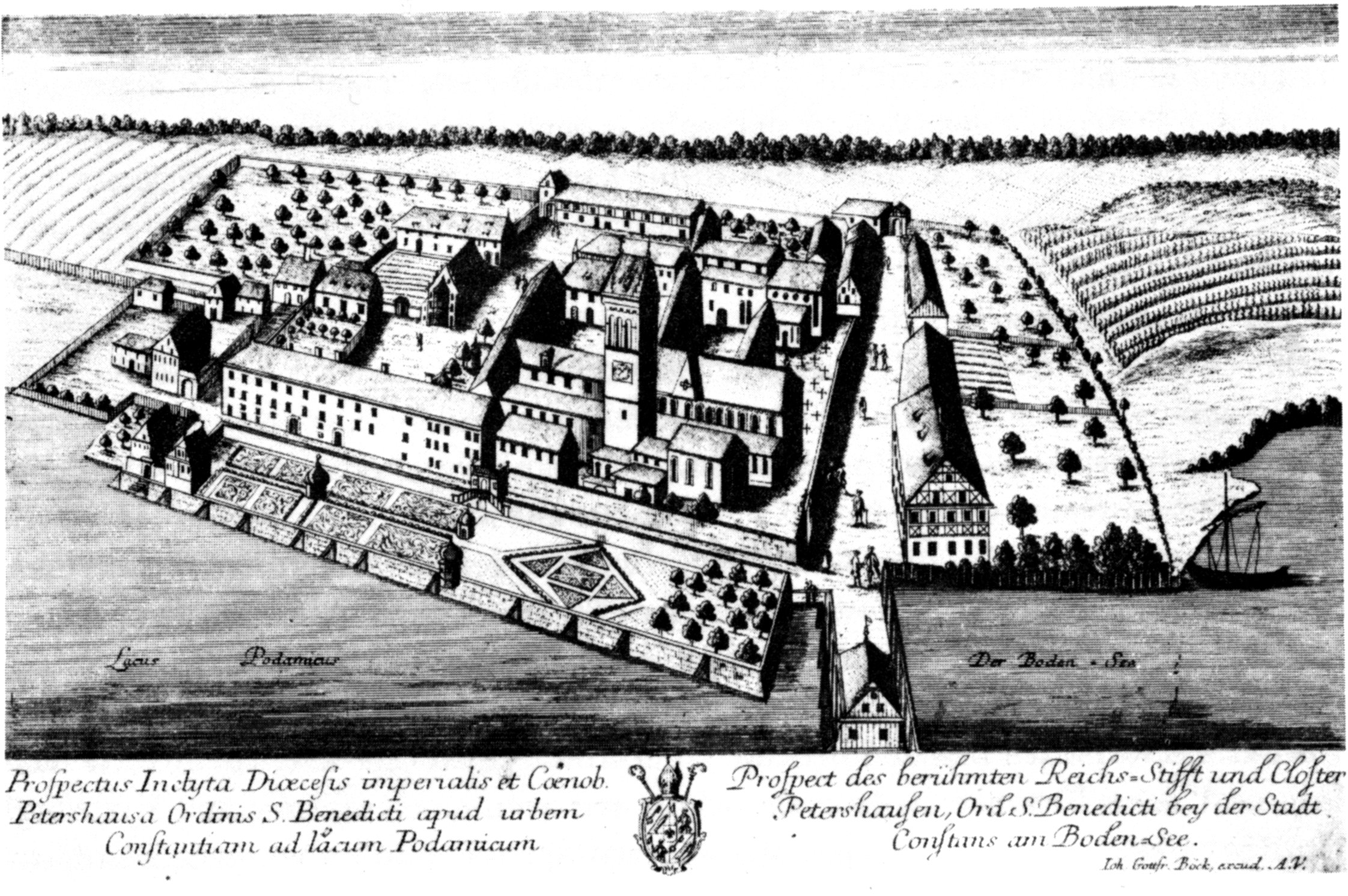
Petershausen, early 18th century

Under Bishop Gebhard III of Zähringen and Abbot Theodoric (1086–1116), the Hirsau Reforms were introduced. In 1097 a filial monastery was established at Mehrerau near Bregenz by Ulrich X, count of Bregenz and his wife, Bertha of Rheinfelden. As Petershausen sided with the papacy in the Investiture Controversy, Gebhard III in 1103 was deposed at the instigation of Emperor Henry IV. The abbey was closed until 1106, the monks fled to the newly established Kastl Abbey in Bavaria. In 1159 the monastery burnt down, and was rebuilt and extended between 1162 and 1180.

=== Imperial Abbey ===
Embroiled in constant disputes over land and jurisdiction with the nearby city and bishopric of Constance as well as with Swabian nobles like the Counts of Montfort, the abbots turned to the Imperial Hohenstaufen dynasty for support. Mindful of the abbey's strategic location at the junction of the Rhine and Lake Constance, Emperor Frederick II, granted immediacy to Petershausen, which thus gained territorial independence as an imperial abbey.

During the Council of Constance (1414–18), the German king Sigismund of Luxembourg stayed at the Petershausen and the abbot was even given the pontifical vestments from Antipope John XXIII. However, the monastery declined during the 14th and 15th centuries, pressed hard by both the free imperial city and the prince-bishopric of Constance. The attempts of Prince-Bishop Hugo von Hohenlandenberg to annex Petershausen were blocked by Maximilian I. However Petershausen was to lose its independence to the city of Constance. The abbey is freed after Constance, which had officially become Protestant in 1530, is conquered by the Spanish troops of Charles V during the Schmalkaldic War, forcibly re-Catholicized, stripped of its status as a free imperial city and absorbed into Further Austria. In 1556, the monks returned to their restored monastery, which slowly recovers thanks to the help of the nearby nobility.

During the Thirty Years' War, the abbey was compelled to build fortification around the monastery and town at its own expenses. A panorama of the fortified abbey can be seen in Matthäus Merian's engraving showing Constance and Petershausen during the siege of 1633. A slow recovery of the abbey began after the end of this destructive war.

Petershausen was finally secularised to Baden in 1802; the library was purchased by the University Library Heidelberg. Margrave Charles Frederick of Baden had parts of the abbey rebuilt as a private residence for his sons. The St Gregory Church was demolished in 1832. The remaining premises were later used as a psychiatric hospital and, after the Second World War, as barracks for the French army. They now accommodate a number of administrative and educational functions and since 1992 the Archaeological Museum of Baden-Württemberg.
