= Territorial Abbey of Wettingen-Mehrerau =

Catholic territorial abbey

Wettingen-Mehrerau Abbey
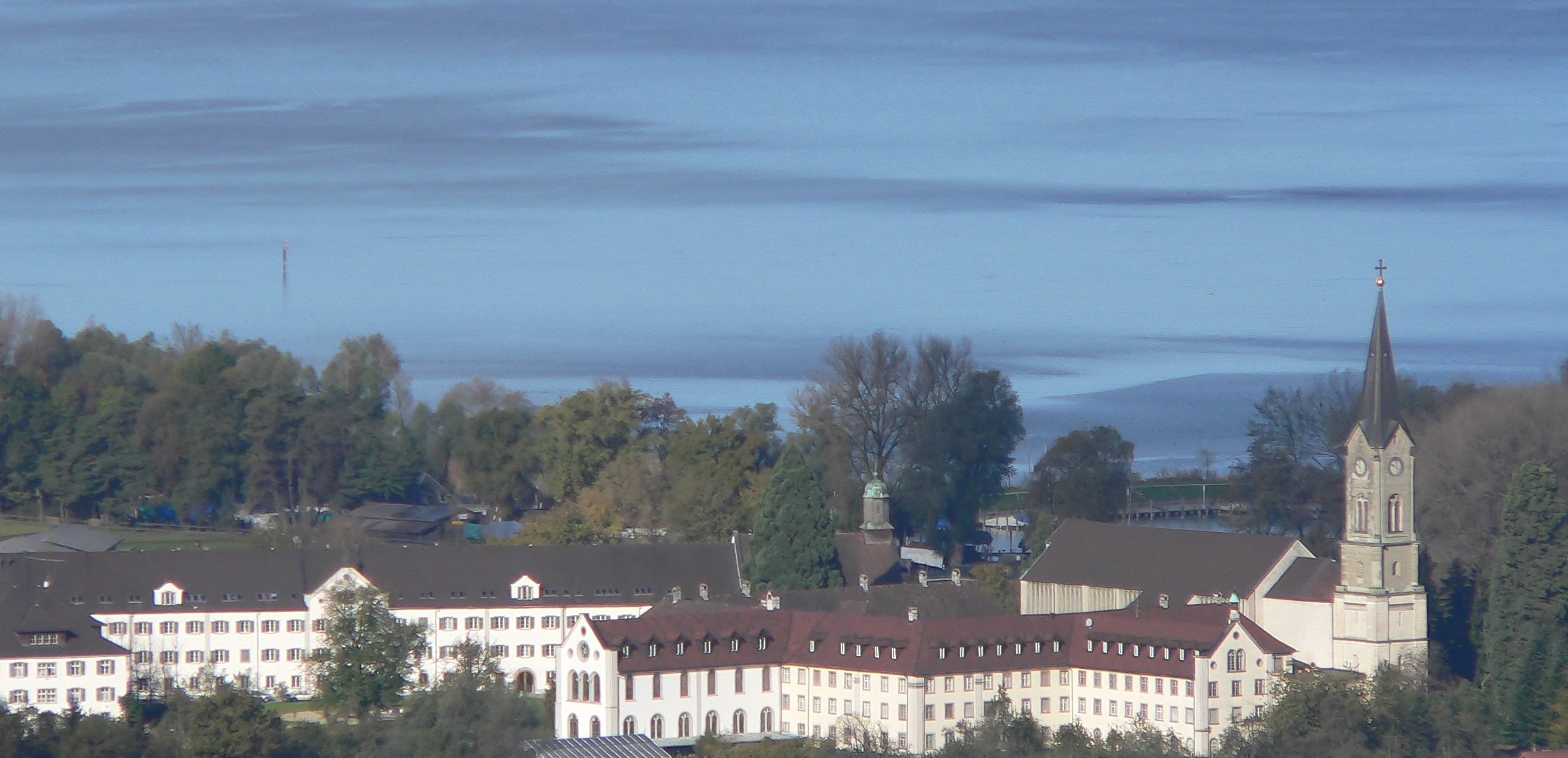
- Wettingen-Mehrerau Abbey near Lake Constance

- Location within Austria

Religion
- Affiliation: Catholic Church
- Ecclesiastical or organisational status: Active
- Leadership: Vinzenz Wohlwend, OCist

Location
- Location: Bregenz, Austria
- State: Vorarlberg
- Coordinates: 47.503611°N 9.720556°E

Architecture
- Type: Monastery
- Style: Romanesque, Gothic

Wettingen-Mehrerau Abbey is a Cistercian territorial abbey and cathedral located at Mehrerau on the outskirts of Bregenz in Vorarlberg, Austria. Wettingen-Mehrerau Abbey is directly subordinate to the Holy See and thus forms no part of the Catholic Archdiocese of Salzburg. The abbot of Wettingen-Mehrerau, however, is a member of the Austrian Bishops' Conference. The official name of the abbey is Beatae Mariae Virginis de Maris Stella et de Augia Majore (Latin: Abbatia Territorialis Beatissimae Mariae Virginis Maris Stellae).

== Mehrerau Abbey ==
The first monastery at Mehrerau was founded by Saint Columbanus who, after he was driven from Luxeuil, settled here about 611 and built a monastery after the model of Luxeuil. A monastery of nuns was soon established nearby.

Little information survives on the history of either foundation up to 1079, when the monastery was reformed by the monk Gottfried, sent by abbot William of Hirsau, and the Rule of St. Benedict was introduced. (It is probable that when the reform was effected the nuns' community was suppressed).

In 1097-98 the abbey was rebuilt by Count Ulrich of Bregenz, its "Vogt" (secular administrator and protector) and his wife, Bertha of Rheinfelden, and re-settled by monks from Petershausen Abbey near Konstanz.

During the 12th and 13th centuries the abbey acquired much landed property; by the middle of the 16th century it had the right of patronage for sixty-five parishes.

During the Reformation the abbey was a strong supporter of Catholicism in Vorarlberg. In particular Ulrich Mötz, later abbot, exerted much influence in the Bregenz Forest by his preaching against the spread of religious innovations while he was provost of Lingenau (1515–33).

During the Thirty Years' War the abbey suffered from the devastation inflicted by the Swedes, who billetted soldiers here and exacted forced contributions; they also robbed the abbey of nearly all its revenues. Nevertheless, it often offered a free refuge to religious expelled from Germany and Switzerland.

By the 18th century however it had recovered and was once more in a very flourishing condition. In 1738 the church was completely rebuilt, as were the monastic buildings in 1774–81.

The existence of Mehrerau was threatened, as was that of other religious foundations, by the attacks upon monasteries of the Emperor Joseph II. However, Abbot Benedict was able to obtain the withdrawal of the decree of suppression, although it had already been signed.

However, the Treaty of Pressburg (1805) gave Vorarlberg, and with it the abbey, to Bavaria, which under the "Reichsdeputationshauptschluss" had already secularised its own religious houses in 1802–03. The Bavarian authorities took an inventory of the abbey in April 1806. In a last attempt to save itself, the abbey offered to become a training-school for male teachers, but the Bavarian State refused the offer and dissolved the abbey with effect from 1 September 1806. The monks were evicted and the valuable library was scattered; part of it was burnt on the spot. The forests and agricultural lands belonging to the abbey were taken by the State.

In February 1807 the church was closed, and the other buildings were sold at auction. In 1808-09 the church was taken down and the material used to build the harbour of Lindau.

== Wettingen-Mehrerau ==
When the district came again under the rule of Austria, the surviving monastic buildings were used for various purposes until in 1853 they were bought, with the permission of Emperor Franz Joseph I, from the last owner, along with some pieces of land connected with them, by the abbot of the Cistercian Wettingen Abbey in Switzerland, a monastery which had been forcibly suppressed by the Canton of Aargau in 1841, and for thirteen years had been seeking a new home.

On 18 October 1854 the Cistercian Abbey of Wettingen-Mehrerau was formally opened. In the same year a monastery school was started. The monastic buildings were extended, and in 1859 a new Romanesque church was built; of particular note is the monument to Cardinal Hergenröther (died 1890), who is buried there.

In the second half of the 19th century Wettingen-Mehrerau took a key role in the reinvigoration of the Cistercian Order. It was a member first of the Swiss Congregation of the Order, then of the Austrian Congregation. In 1888, along with Marienstatt Abbey, it left the Austrian Congregation and together with the Swiss nunneries that were subordinate to it, formed the Mehrerau Congregation, which was responsible for new settlements in Sittich in Slovenia and Mogila in Poland.

In 1919 Wettingen-Mehrerau bought the pilgrimage church at Birnau and the nearby Schloss Maurach, which to this day it runs as a priory. In Mehrerau itself the community runs a sanatorium and the "Collegium Bernardi", a secondary school with a boarding-house.

The abbot has the title of Abbot of Wettingen and Prior of Mehrerau. He also has responsibility for the Cistercian nunneries in Switzerland.

== Burials ==
- Ulrich X, Count of Bregenz
- Bertha of Rheinfelden
- Rudolf I, Count of Bregenz
- Joseph Hergenröther
- John Joseph Frederick Otto Zardetti
- Cassian Haid

== List of abbots of Wettingen-Mehrerau ==
- Leopold Höchle (1854–1864)
- Martin Reimann (1864–1878)
- Maurus Kalkum (1878–1893)
- Laurentius Wocher (1893–1895)
- Augustin Stöckli (1895–1902)
- Eugen Notz (1902–1917)
- Cassian Haid (1917–1949), Abbot General in 1920–1927
- Heinrich Suso Groner (1949–1968)
- Kassian Lauterer (1968–2009)
- Anselm van der Linde (2009–2018)
- Vinzenz Wohlwend (from 2018)

== Gallery ==
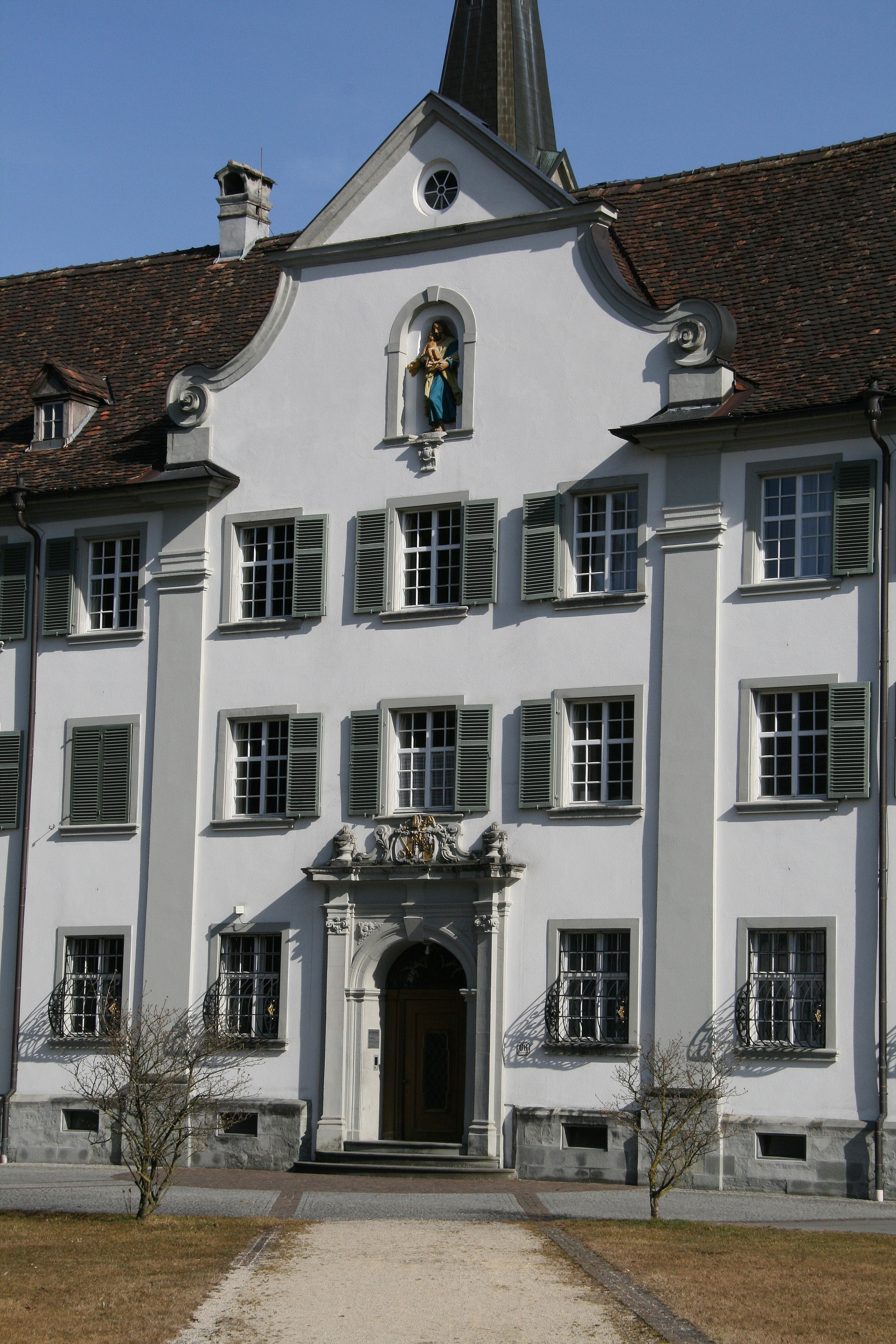
Wettingen-Mehrerau Abbey

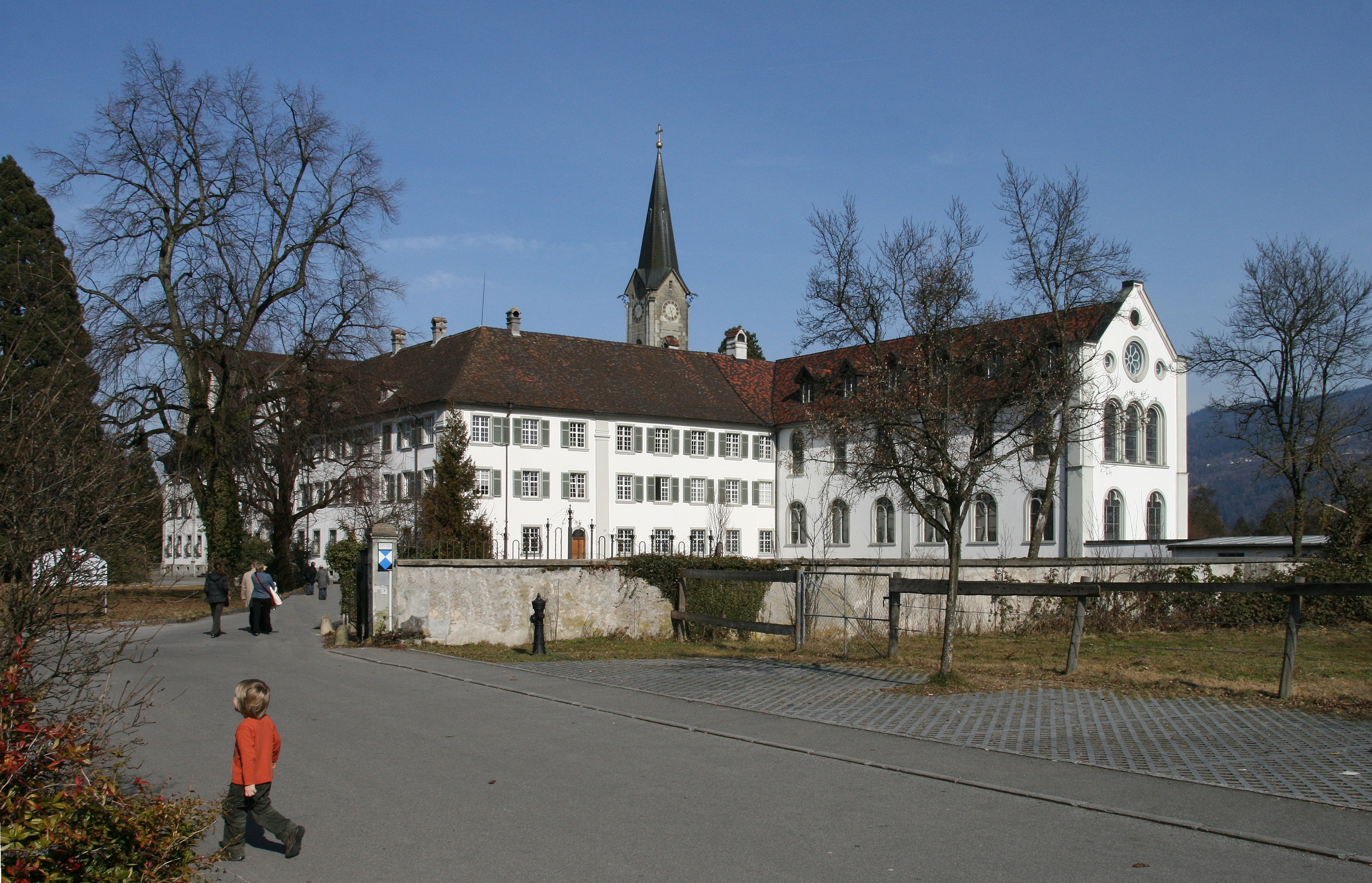
Wettingen-Mehrerau Abbey

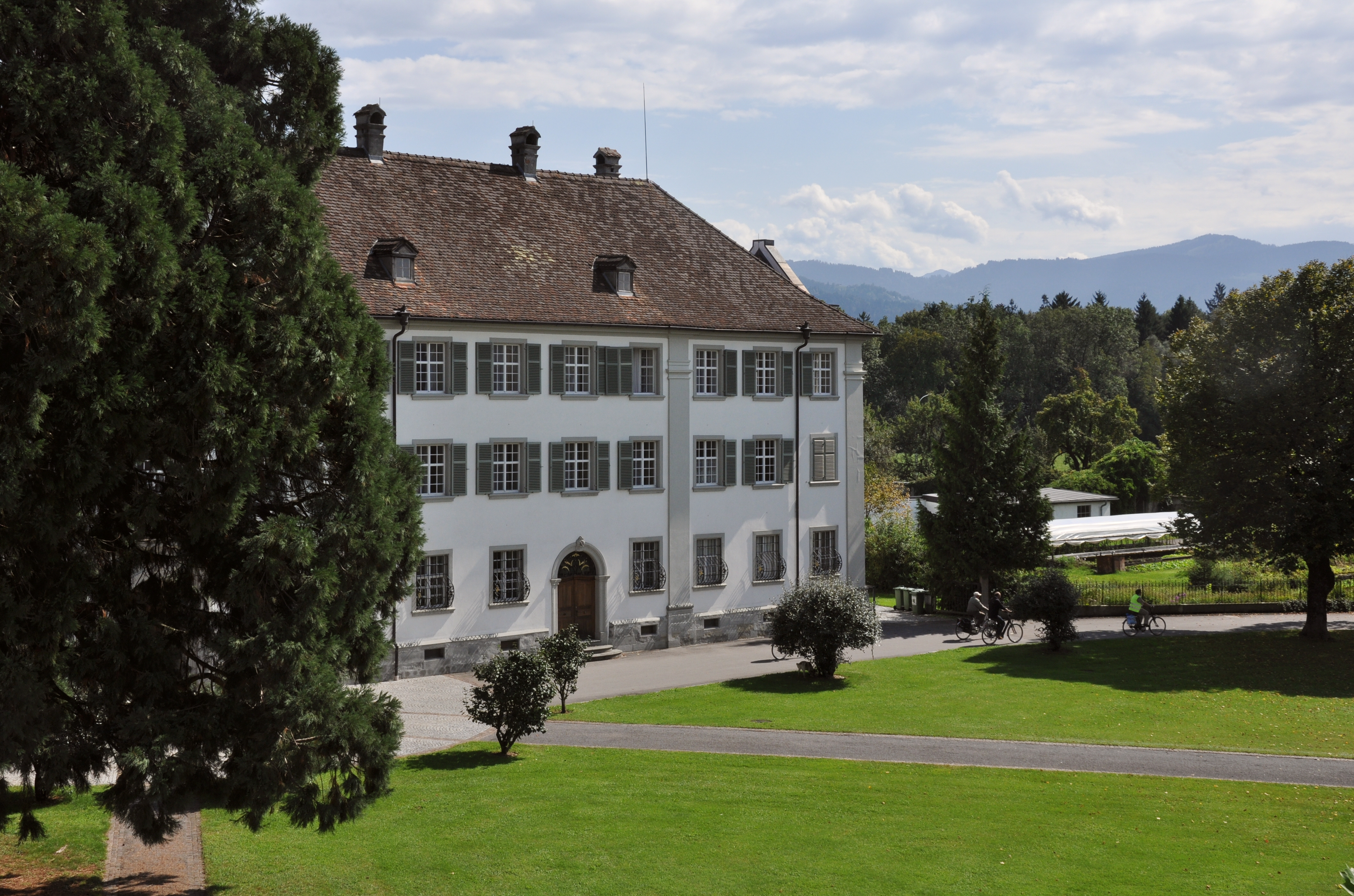
Wettingen-Mehrerau Abbey

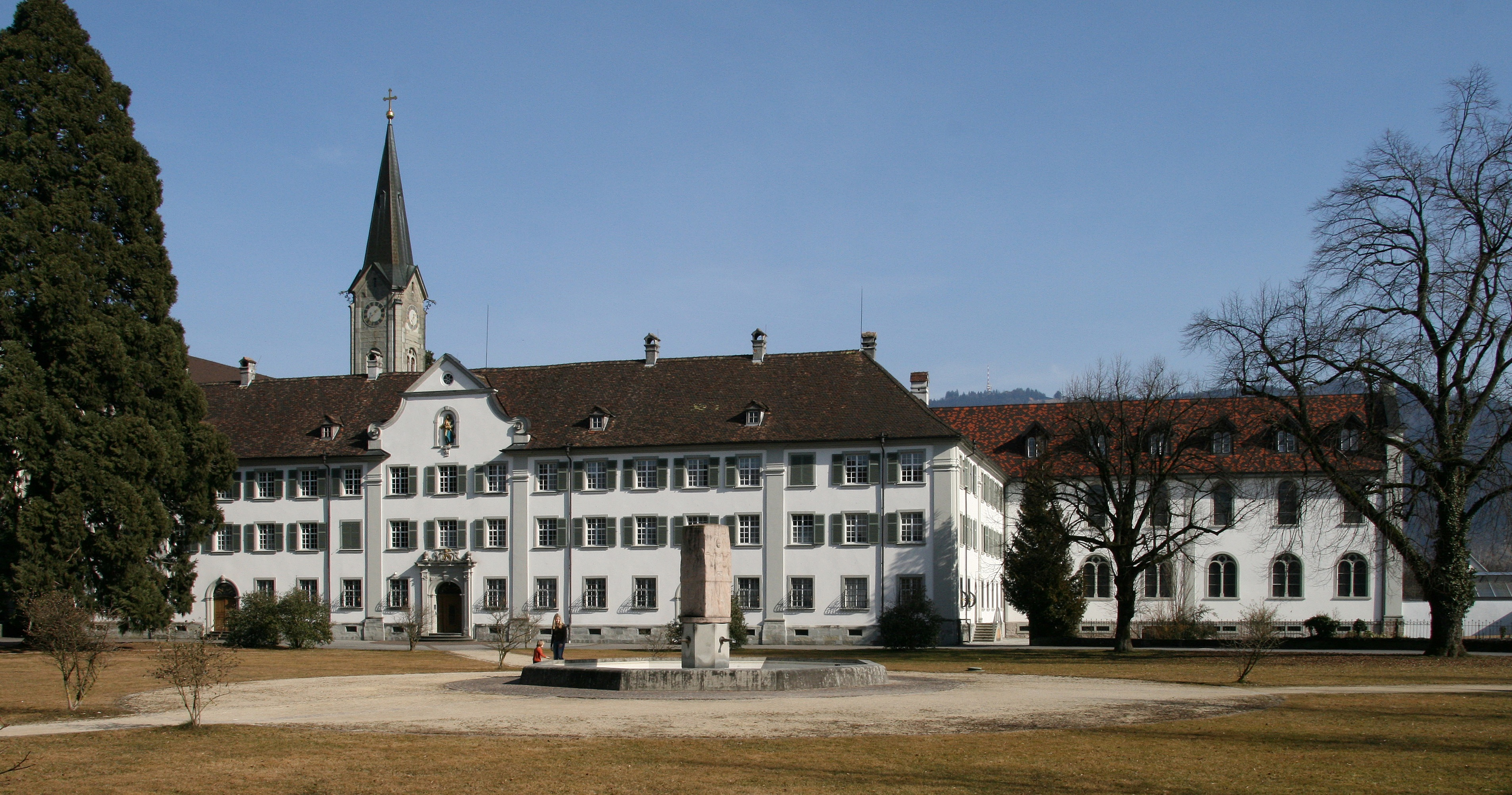
Wettingen-Mehrerau Abbey

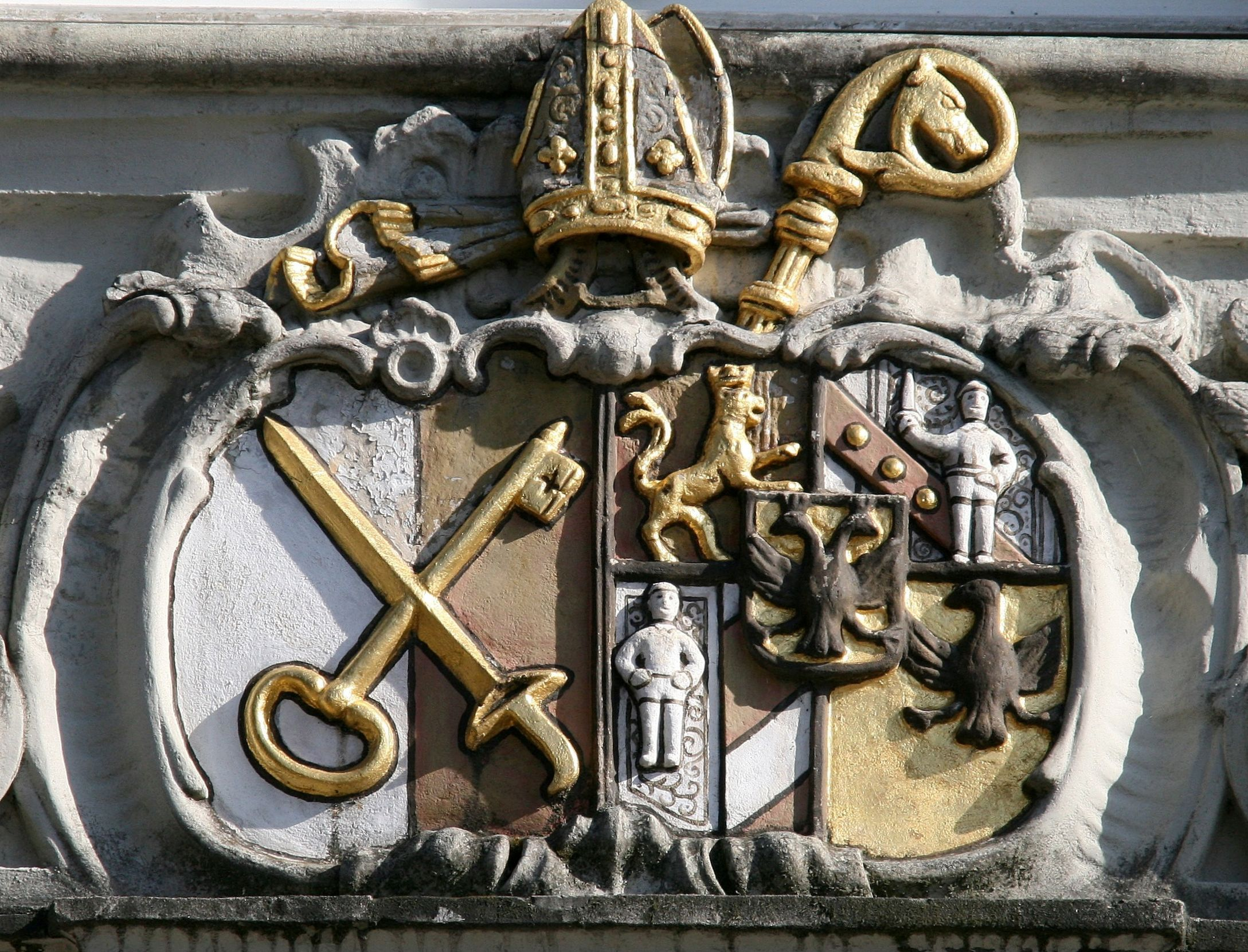
Coat of arms
