= County of Bregenz =

European polity

Coat of arms of the county of Bregenz

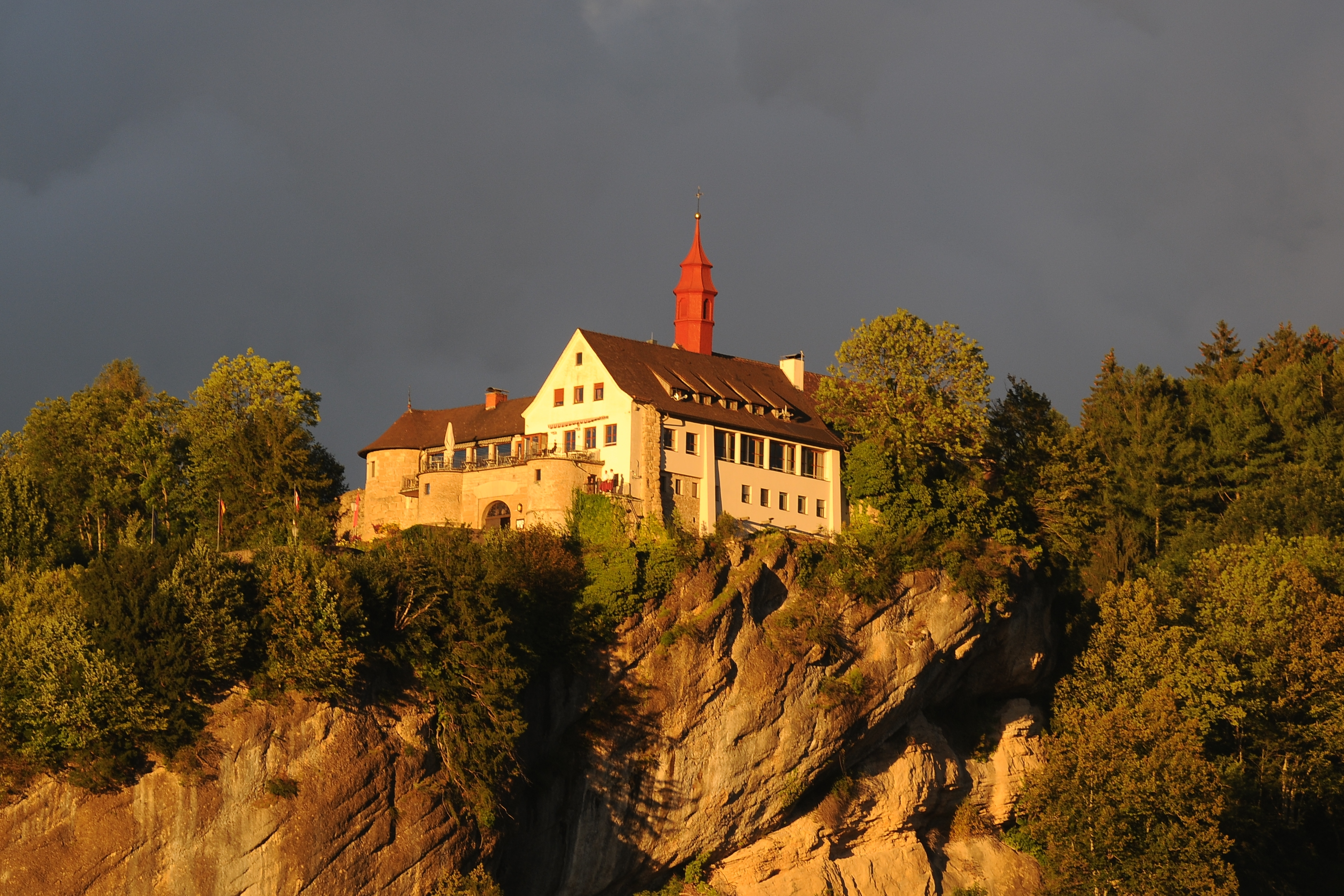
Hohenbregenz Castle

The County of Bregenz is recorded as part of the Holy Roman Empire between 1043 and 1160. It was in possession of the Udalriching family, who took the titles of counts of Bregenz.

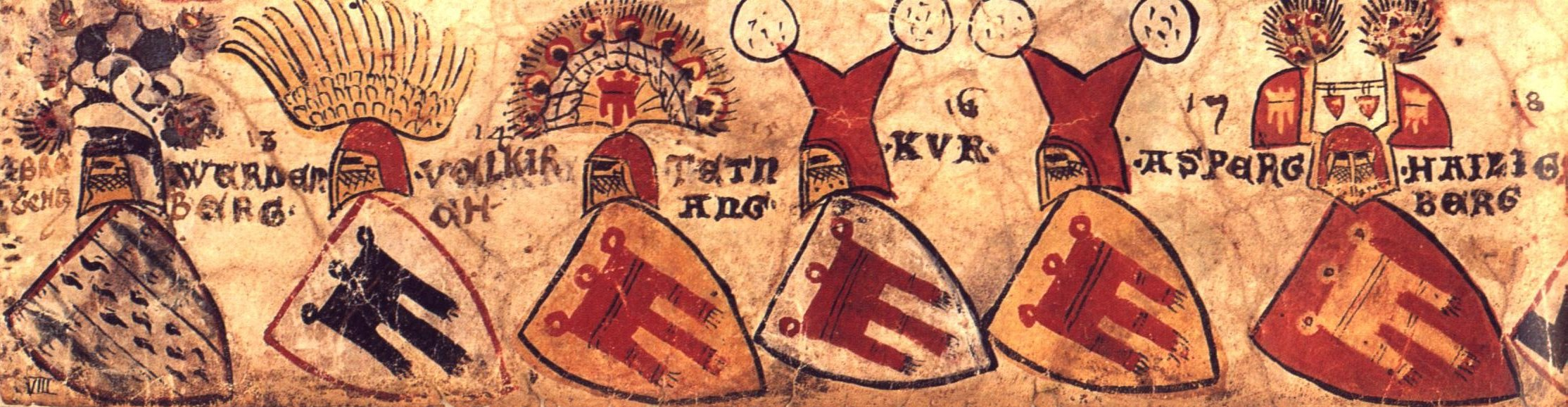
Coat of arms of the County of Bregenz as mentioned in the Zürich armorial (far left).

After 1160, Bregenz fell to the counts of Montfort-Bregenz (1160 to 1338), a cadet branch of the counts of Montfort, Montfort-Tettnang-Bregenz (1354 to 1451). After 1451 the title of count of Bregenz was held by the House of Habsburg and Bregenz was incorporated into the duchy of Austria. The nominal title of count of Bregenz was kept as part of the grand title of the Emperor of Austria until 1918.

== Counts of Bregenz ==
Counts of Bregenz (Udalriching):

- Ulrich VI, d. 950/957, count in Bregenz, count in Raetia
- Ulrich IX, d. before 1079, count of Bregenz, count in Argengau and Nibelgau
- Ulrich X, d. 1097, count of Bregenz
- Rudolf I, d. 1160, count of Bregenz, count in Lower Raetia, count of Chur

Afterwards the head of the House of Habsburg carried the title.

== See also ==
- Duchy of Swabia
- Churraetia
- Counts of Montfort (Swabia)
- Further Austria
