= History of Goslar =

Goslar is a World Heritage Site in Germany.

== Neolithic/Megalithic settlements in and around the Harz ==
The earliest archeological finds near Goslar date back to 100,000-50,000 B.C.. In Salzgitter-Lebenstedt, stone tools thought to stem from Mousterian Culture have been discovered.

By 4,500 B.C. the region was probably settled by farmers originating from the Danube region. One of their settlements was found in 1956 in Eitzum near Wolfenbüttel.

The most densely populated area during this period was probably the area between the Harz, the Thuringian Forest and the river Elbe. Near Nebra, some 93 miles South-East from Goslar across the Harz Highlands, archeologists have found the Nebra sky disc, which may have originated in the Carpathian Mountains. This hints at the fact that the Harz Highlands, too, and in particular the region around Goslar, were inhabited by people belonging to the Únětice culture during this time. In addition, in the vicinity of the projected site of discovery, near Goseck, a Neolithic structure—the so-called Goseck Circle—was unearthed, yielding some insight into the culture and habits of the people that probably were also living at the foot of the Harz Highlands during this period. A further Neolithic structure that is not that well preserved was found in Quenstedt near Aschersleben.

Several objects of high-quality dating back to the megalithic period were also found near Bernburg.

== Roman and Saxon times ==
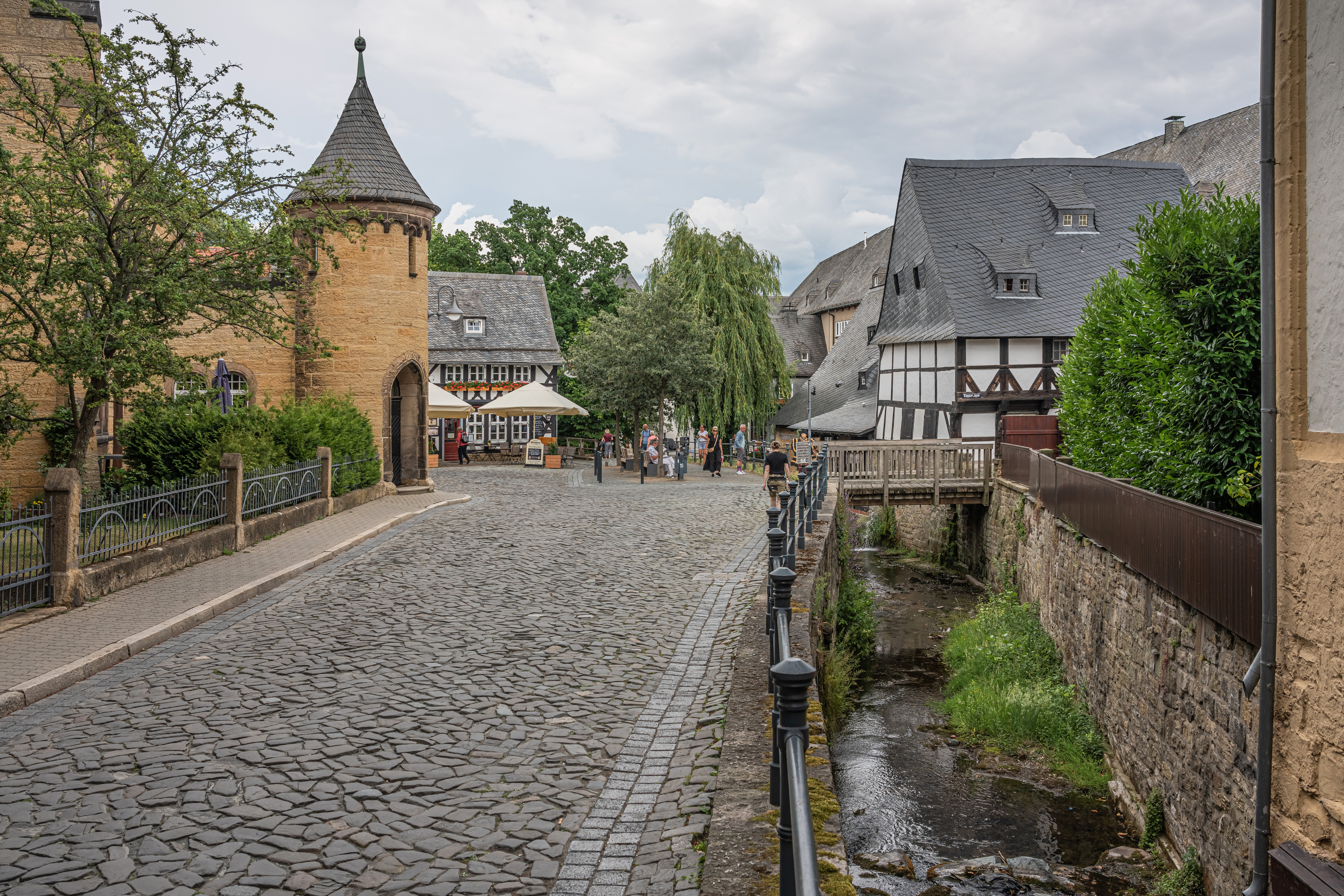
The Abzucht stream in the town centre

From Roman times, the Harz mountains were an important area for ore mining. For example, settlements appeared here and at the edge of the Harz where ore was processed and refined into metals. Archaeological finds from England show that many Anglo-Saxon grave goods, like the sword found in London, were made of metal from ore extracted in the Harz.

The town of Goslar emerged from one of these settlements on the northern edge of the Harz Mountains, founded in AD 922 in the reign of Henry I of East Francia (Henry the Fowler), according to Saxon tradition. The first written record, for Otto II, does not appear until 979. In 934, it is likely that a royal castle was built on the hill of the Georgenberg and, from 968, the mining industry at Rammelsberg was developed. The mineworkers needed for this industry lived in Bergedorf around the church of St. John. The embossed silver Otto Adelheid pennies made of Goslar silver are the first tangible evidence of the mining industry. The onset of metallurgy around 990 required professional tradesmen who were distinguished from the native Saxons as "Franks" and settled on the so-called Frankenberg.

== Goslar's imperial period (1009–1253) ==
1009 was the beginning of an important era for Goslar as a central Kaiserpfalz (imperial palace) of the Holy Roman Empire. That year the first imperial synod was held here under Henry II. The palace was probably located in the hill of Georgenberg. Henry II held further imperial councils and synods in Goslar in 1015, 1017 and 1019, and he stayed in Goslar seven times in all. The palace at Goslar gradually superseded the one at Werla, which was given up by the foreign emperors due to its importance for the nobility of Saxony. The development of Goslar as a central location for the Empire reached its zenith under the Salians.

Even on his royal tour (Königsumritt) in 1024 Conrad II was supposed to have celebrated Christmas in Goslar and, in 1025, to have laid the foundation stone for the Imperial Palace of Goslar. Conrad also confirmed the rights of Goslar's long-distance trade merchants. Conrad made a total of six visits to Goslar.

Henry III developed Goslar into his favorite palace at the centre of his empire: during the 17 years of his reign rule he held court in Goslar 18 times, often for several months. In 1042 Henry III received Peter of Hungary and a mission from Yaroslav of Kiev. In the years that followed he appointed many bishops and dukes at Goslar. In 1045 Queen Agnes founded the St. Peter's Abbey (Peterstift). In 1050 the Church of St. Simon and St. Jude was consecrated by Archbishop Hermann of Cologne and it subsequently developed into a major training centre for the imperial bishops (Reichsepiskopat). At the same time the palace was extended with the hall of representatives known as the Aula Regis. On 11 November 1050 Henry IV was born in Goslar. In September 1056 Pope Victor II attended Henry III and reconsecrated the abbey church in Goslar. This meeting was the last time that there was the union between emperor and pope in the sense of a civitas dei ("City of God"). After his death a few weeks later, the heart of Henry III was buried in Goslar's Church of St. Simon and St. Jude.

Under Henry IV the importance of Goslar to the Salians remained unbroken. A total of 30 visits by the emperor are recorded. In 1063 a dispute over precedence arose in the Collegiate Church of St. Simon and St. Jude between Abbot Wideradus of Fulda and Bishop Hezilo of Hildesheim, which ended in a massacre in the church (known as Bloody Pentecost) under the eyes of the helpless Henry IV.

Henry IV installed Goslar's first imperial vogt as his representative in the administration of the royal estate. When the long stays of the king in Goslar, which were expensive for the state, and his imperial policy brought the Saxon nobility into conflict with the king, the situation escalated at the gathering of the princes in Goslar in 1073 into a rebellion of the Saxons. Goslar aligned itself during the chaos that ensued with the opposing party. As a result, in 1077 a princes' meeting took place in Goslar under the "antiking", Rudolf of Rheinfelden. In 1081 Hermann of Salm was anointed as (anti-)king in Goslar. In 1105 Henry V called a council against his father in Goslar.

In the 12th century, the town's extent was roughly the same as today's old town (Altstadt) and comprised seven churches, including the Church of the Cross, a town wall and the ensemble of a Residenz with its collegiate church and imperial palace or Kaiserpfalz, that has been labelled by historians as the "Rome of the North". In 1075 Goslar is referred to as a civitas (town) for the first time.

Henry V held six imperial diets (Reichstage) in Goslar over ten visits. Under Lothar III of Süpplingenburg, too, Conrad III and especially under Frederick I, Goslar was a preferred Kaiserpfalz. In 1136 a fire destroyed a third of the town. In 1150 the Rathstiefsten Gallery, a drainage adit for the Rammelsberg mine, was completed.

In 1152 Frederick I enfeoffed Henry the Lion with the Goslar Reichsvogtei. In 1158 the emperor gave the citizens of the Goslar the Kaiserforst or "Imperial Forest". In 1167 Goslar was besieged unsuccessfully by Henry the Lion. In 1173 in Goslar Frederick I rejected a request by Henry the Lion for the lordship of the town in return for his allegiance in the Italian campaign. Goslar and Rammelsberg remained a pawn in the conflict between the cousins until Henry the Lion was proscribed. In the ensuing war Goslar was shocked in 1180 from the siege by Henry the Lion from the emperor. Henry had the smelting works and mines destroyed, so the mining came to a standstill until 1209.

With the ascendance of Henry VI the role of Goslar as an imperial palace declined. King Otto IV besieged Goslar in 1198/99, but had to retreat before Philip of Swabia. In 1206 Goslar was stormed and looted, allegedly aided by the treachery of the domina of the monastery of Neuwerk, Gunzelin of Wolfenbüttel, a follower of Otto IV.

During the reign of Frederick II the last imperial diet (Reichstag) was held in Goslar, where a compromise was found between the Hohenstaufens and the Welfs. Goslar's role as an imperial palace ended with the visits of Count Wilhelm of Holland in 1252 and 1253.

== Medieval town (1219–1523) ==
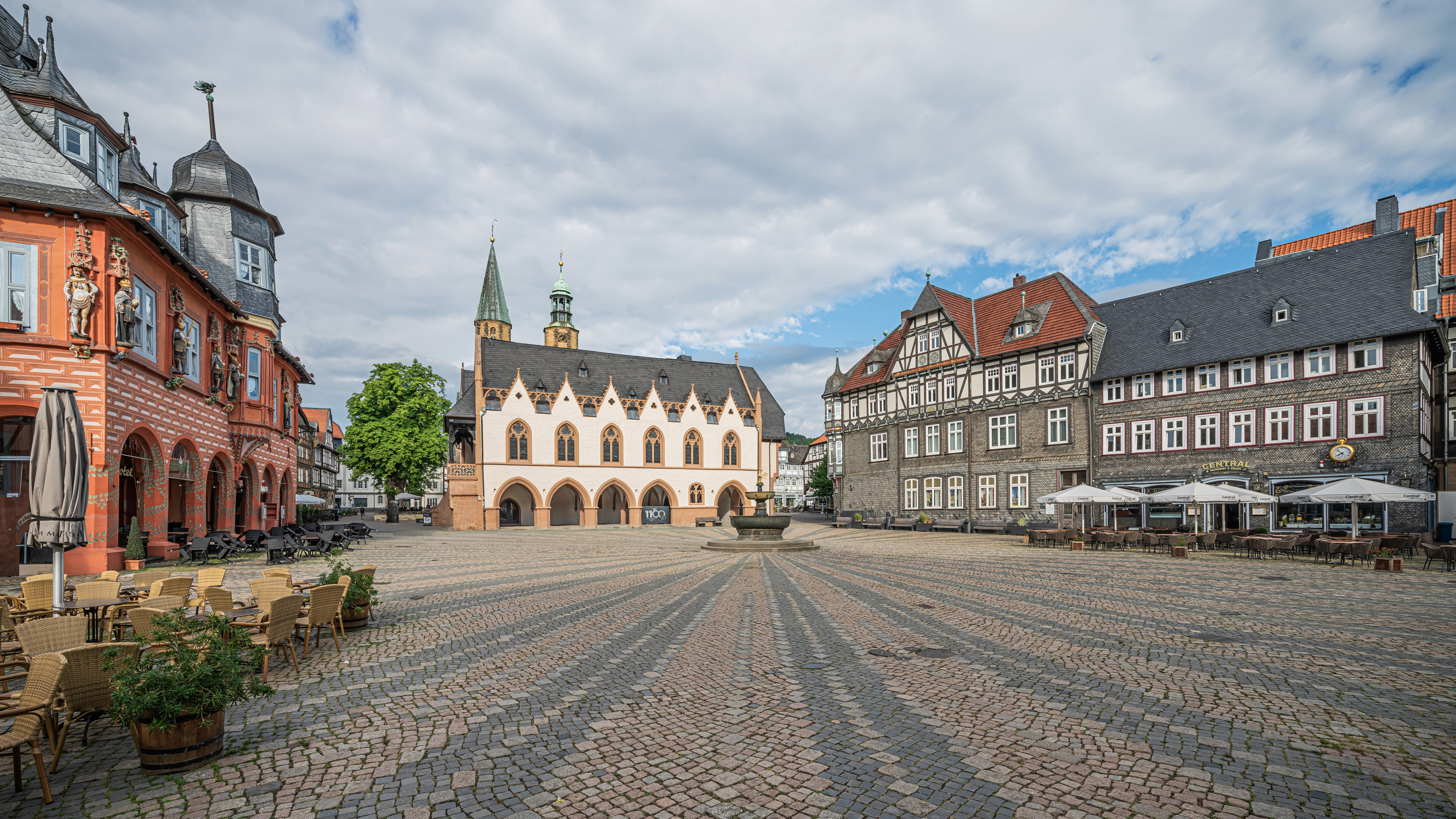
Town centre

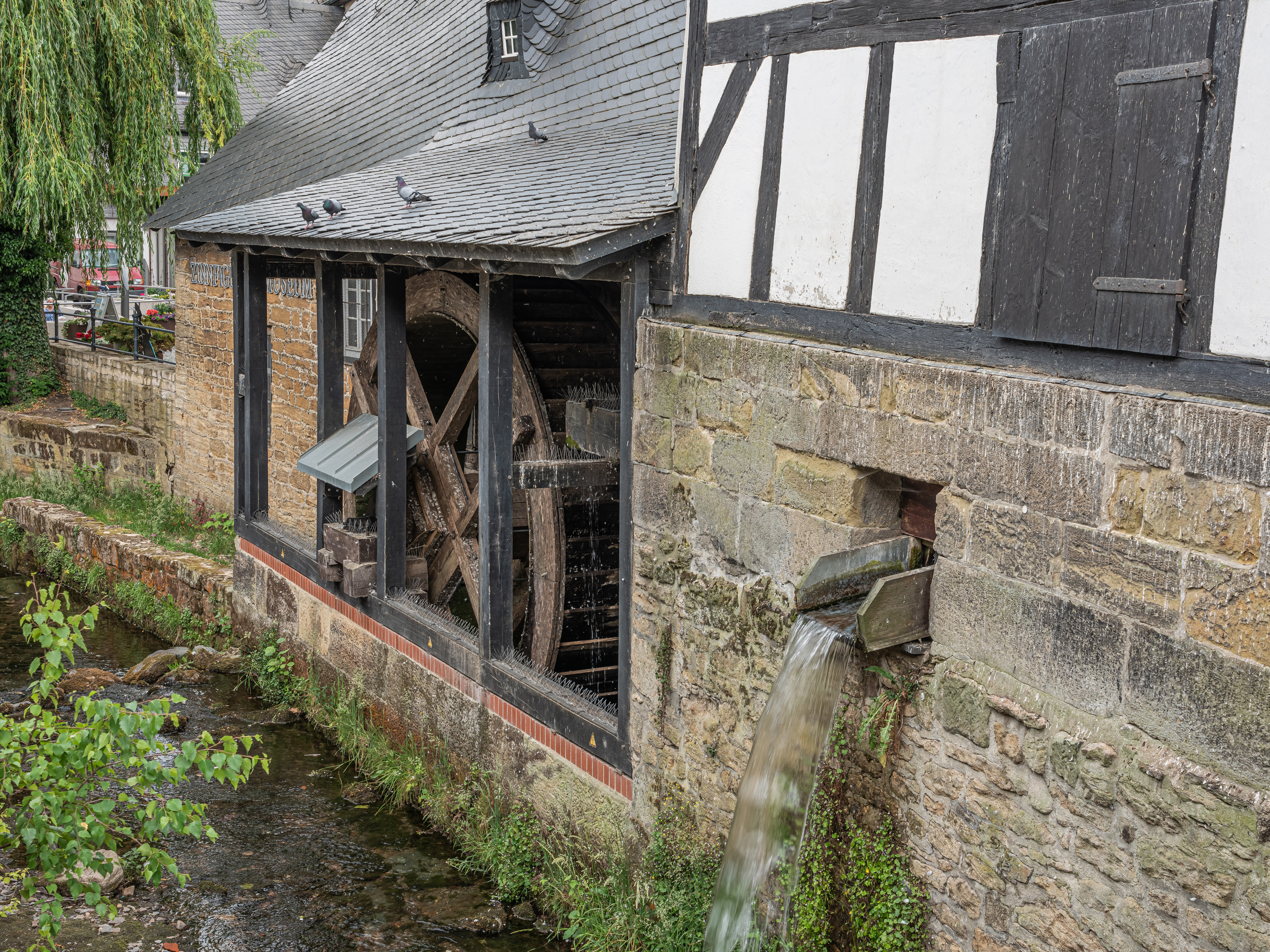
The Lohmühle mill

The withdrawal of the emperors from the northern part of the empire saw the beginnings of the rise of urban independence. Upon the conferral of Goslar's town rights that was based on the rights of long-distance merchants in 1025, the town council, first mentioned in 1219, sought a permanent recognition of rights and the expansion of municipal authority. The merchants, who set up the council with the lesser nobility (ministeriales), became increasingly self-confident. The focus of their effort was the acquisition of mining rights and advocacy (Vogtei rights).

In 1235 a crisis arose due to a lack of drainage in the Rammelsberg mines that led to the situation where only the spoil tips were being mined. The copper trade continued, however profits were down compared with the preceding period. This weakness in the mining industry was used by the Worth guilds to strengthen their political power within the council.

From 1267 to 1566 Goslar belonged to the municipal and merchant union of the Hanseatic League. However Goslar took advantage of the Hanseatic League, using it more as a political tool to assert itself against its neighbours, than to attract long-range trading profits. In particular, the maintenance of internal order and town council constitution were issues for Goslar's Hanseatic policy. When Goslar believed it was not sufficiently well protected it withdrew in favour of regional alliances. Copper and silver trading was important for Goslar, as were beer exports after the 13th century. From 1323 there is documentary evidence of slate quarrying and, from 1468, vitriol production. Trade with towns in the local region, with Saxony, Thuringia and Cologne was especially important, which is why Hanseatic trade was never the highest priority for Goslar.

In 1290 the council managed to get to the most important advocacy rights conferred on the town. Goslar was now a free town. Council and guilds also agreed in a compromise to a composition of the council composed of members of the merchants', minters', shopkeepers', bakers', cobblers' and butchers' guilds. In addition, the coal and silver miners together with the mining village became part of the town. Institutions such as the six men (Sechsmannen) of the coal and silver miners gradually joined the council. There were major constitutional struggles again in 1460, because the small guilds and communities also wanted a slice of political power. In the mill and hall dispute (1290–1293), the council was able to stand against the monasteries and abbeys and reduce the influence of the church in the town.

The award of the Army ban right in 1340 by Louis IV expanded Goslar's rights under the passive feudal law. In 1348 and 1413, the last advocacy rights were awarded to the town. From 1366 the advocate or bailiff (Vogt) was only municipal official. Around 1340 Goslar town law was codified in 5 volumes. Goslar law extended far beyond the town boundary and was adopted by other towns. In legal disputes Goslar became a prestigious magistrate's court.

Plague epidemics raged in 1348, 1376 and 1377. However, there were no Jewish pogroms or riots unlike other places.

The mining jurisdiction and the tithes that had been granted in 1235 to the Brunswick Welfs and enfeoffed in 1296 to the knights of the Gowische were taken over by the Sechsmannen in 1356 and then from them to the town council. In 1359 the Goslar Mining Law was passed. As a consequence of this development, the council sought in 1360 to resolve the drainage issue in order to reactivate the mine that had now almost come to a standstill. In 1407, 1418 and 1432, the council tried, in association with foreign investors and various master miners, to drain the pits. In the years 1453-1456 Claus von Gotha achieved partial success with the Heinzenkunst a water wheel designed to lift and empty a chain of water buckets. By 1471 mining had recovered to such an extent that the council introduced new charges for the trades and ended up buying all the shares from the mine's owner. From 1478 the smelting of metals was also facilitated by the new Seigerverfahren dressing process. Attempts by the dukes of Brunswick to redeem the pledge for the Rammelsberg again redeem were prevented by the town in 1477 and 1484. Goslar experienced a major boom from the proceeds of the mine and smelters. By 1511 the council was able to gain sole ownership of all mines at Rammelsberg.

In the 14th century Goslar was one of the very few towns that was able to provide all domestic properties with a water main system using wooden pipes, so that the kitchens were equipped with running water and the townsfolk did not have to collect water from a well.

In the wake of rampant robber barons and feuding in the 15th century, Goslar completed improvements to its fortifications in 1519 and entered into various alliances and even armed itself. The family of Schwichelt proved to be a dogged opponent at the Harzburg in 1411/12, at Wiedelah and Lutter in 1427 and in a noble family feud in 1472. Likewise there were always new threats from the dukes of Brunswick. Goslar was involved in defensive alliances and came to the aid of towns troubled by internal unrest or robbers. The Saxon Town Association (Sächsischer Städtebund) proved to be especially significant. In addition, the town tried to get neighbouring principalities to discharge their duties under defensive treaties.

Around 1520 Goslar was a thriving town, which sought to expand its territory and its rights. Income from mining, smelting and forestry created a prosperity that was reflected in a brisk level of construction in the town centre.

== The Reformation and conflict with Duke Henry the Younger (1523–1552) ==
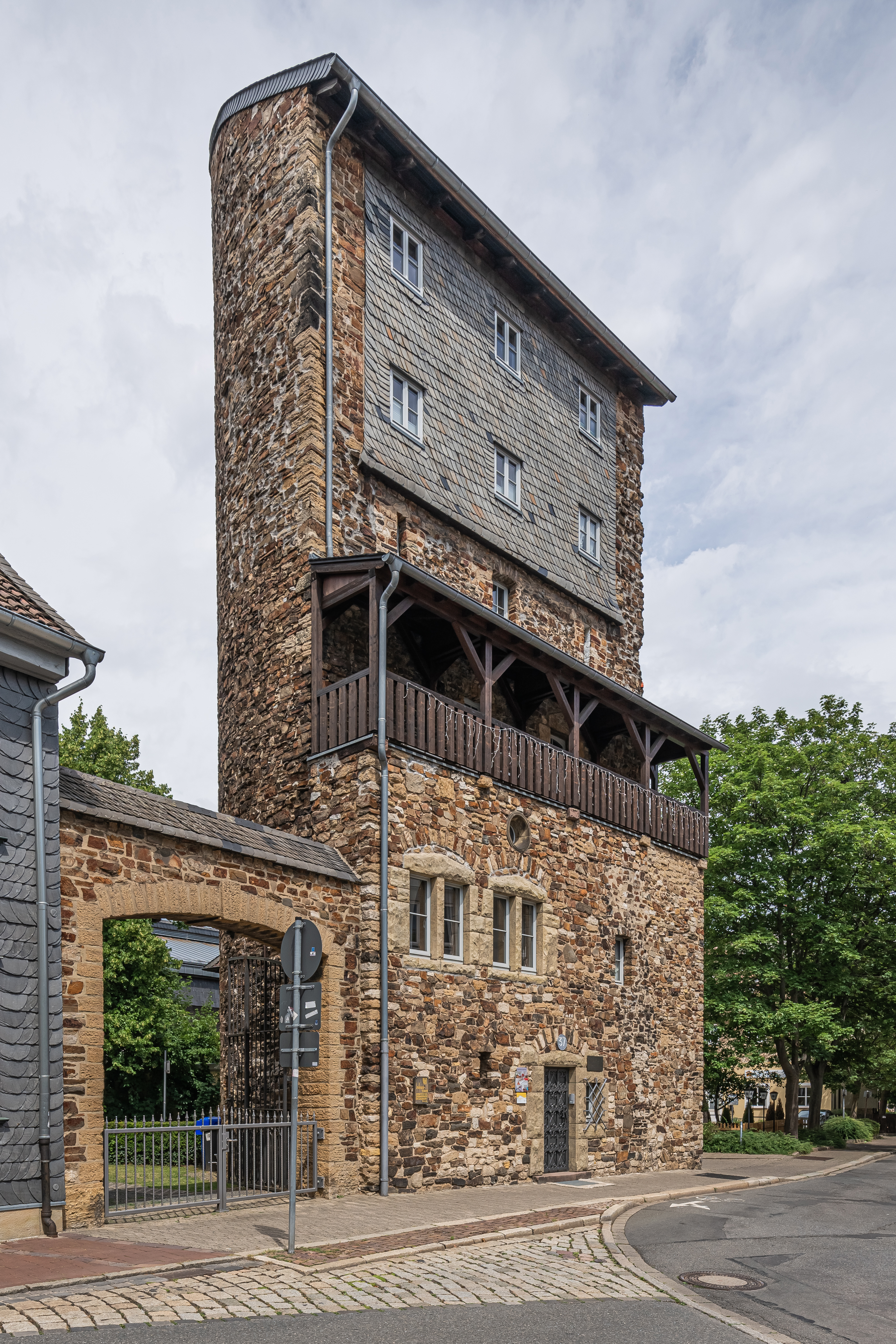
The Weber Tower, part of the old town fortifications

In 1527, aware of the renewed boom in mining and benefiting from the outcome of the Hildesheim Diocesan Feud, Duke Henry the Younger of Brunswick-Wolfenbüttel paid back the pledge for mining rights and tithes and acquired the Rammelsberg and most of the forests in the area. As a result of the resistance to the actions of the Duke, there was a running battle up to 1552 between the Welfs and Goslar. The town brought an action against the Duke at the Imperial Chamber Court, which ruled largely in their favour in 1528.

When Henry the Younger moved against the town with an army in 1527, there were riots against ducal officials and the monasteries of St. George, St. Peter and the Holy Sepulchre located outside the walls were destroyed along with the mining village church of St. John. In 1540-1541 Henry the Younger brought an action for breach of the peace against the town as a result of the destruction caused which finally led to the imposition of an imperial ban on Goslar.

In 1526 after the Reformation was introduced under the influence of external threats after fierce resistance from the council faction which was loyal to the emperor, the council called Nicholas of Amsdorf in 1528 to Goslar and established under his directorship the Municipal School of Latin. In 1531 Amsdorf wrote the first church order.

The conflict with the Duke came to a head when the Duke ignored the direction and mediation of the Emperor and Empire and began using violence against the townsfolk of Goslar. Using his middlemen, he instigated feuds and blockades against the town, and had Goslar's delegates to the Reichstag, such as Dr. Dellingshausen in 1530, attacked and kidnapped.

Goslar realised that it was not sufficiently protected by the emperor and so in 1536 it joined the Schmalkaldic League, which resulted in a short respite in the town. When In 1540, Duke Henry the Younger, who was charged with implementing the imperial ban advanced against Goslar even after the ban had been repealed, the Schmalkaldic League intervened and occupied the Principality of Brunswick-Wolfenbüttel. With the victory of Emperor Charles V at the Battle of Mühlberg in 1547 this protection lapsed, however, so Henry the Younger was able to resume his harassment of Goslar and besiege the town in 1552 with 17,000 men. After the first bombardment, negotiations took place concluding in the Riechenberg Treaty which saw the town surrendering its mining tithes and rights, its right of first refusal and large parts of its forest estate.

== From the Riechenberg Treaty to the end of the imperial immediacy (1552–1803) ==
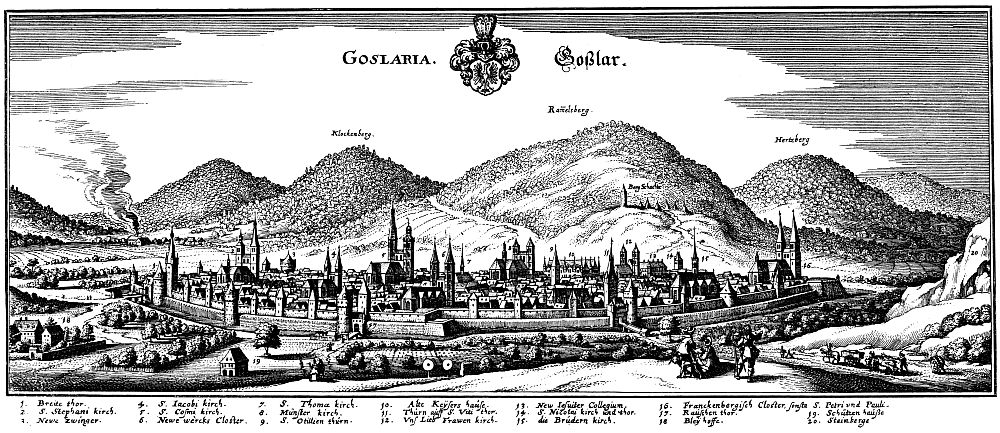
Goslar in 1640

As a result of the Riechenberg Treaty, Duke Henry the Younger and, from 1568, his son Duke Julius together with senior steward (Oberverwalter), Christoph Sander, organised the Lower Harz mining and smelting industry from an economic perspective. The town of Goslar was gradually ousted as a shareholder in the mines and smelters as a result of this process. As the Raths-Tiefsten Gallery was succeeded by the Tiefen-Julius-Fortunatus Gallery and the duke acquired mining and smelting works by purchase or transfer in the period up to 1575, the town lost more income. Vitriol boiling remained a lucrative business for the council until it was restricted in 1556 by the Duke. Goslar beer became more important as an economic mainstay. Attempts by the dukes of Brunswick to incorporate Goslar into their territory, thus transforming it from the patronage they had held since 1552 into direct rule, were roundly rejected by the Goslar townsfolk in 1582, 1605/06 and 1614/15.

Between the first recorded trial of Venne Richerdes in 1530 and 1657 about 28 people were convicted as witches.

From 1600 to 1647 Master Johannes Nendorf was headmaster of the municipal school and made sure that, besides the sons of local burghers and regional nobles, Swedes and Livonians also attended the school.

During the Thirty Years' War Goslar at first tried to stay neutral, but then leaned towards the emperor's side. On 4 February 1622 there was an uprising led by the weavers against the town's rulers sparked by inflation during the "Kipper und Wipper" period. Although the dispute was settled at the last moment, it led to attacks against minters and Jews. Attempts by Christian the Younger of Brunswick-Wolfenbüttel, to seize the town in the night of 5 March and on 15 March 1626 were repulsed. Instead the council, in particular Mayor Henning Cramer of Clausbruch, made contact with Count Tilly, Albert of Wallenstein and the court in Vienna, both to spare the city from harm and to have the Treaty of Riechenberg revised. As part of the Edict of Restitution in 1629, monasteries of the Catholic orders were returned, and the cathedral and Kaiserhaus signed over to the Jesuits in 1630. When the army of Gustavus Adolphus advanced, Goslar was occupied by Swedish troops from 1632 to 1635. In the negotiations between Emperor Ferdinand III and Duke Augustus of Brunswick-Wolfenbüttel, which ended in the Goslar Accord of 1642, Goslar's loyalty to the emperor was not rewarded: The Rammelsberg remained in the possession of the House of Welf.

In 1655 a new chancellery ordinance was adopted which was intended to minimize the number and length of trials. In 1666 simmering conflicts between burghers who were not on the council and the town's government led to constitutional battles for council membership, which were settled by an agreement brokered by the mediator, Theobald Freiherr von Kurzrock. Despite the establishment of a common council the settlement did not bring the hoped-for balance of power.

In the wars of the 18th century Goslar was only affected by having to share its taxes and to quarter troops. There was no destruction caused by war or soldiers. Attempts by the dukes of Brunswick, to seize the town, despite the treaty protecting it from being inherited, were rejected. Victories by imperial troops and the enthronement of the respective emperors were celebrated with much pomp in Goslar. Homage was paid to Joseph I in 1705 by Count Schwarzburg but the cost of the resulting celebrations meant that Goslar was temporarily unable to pay its dues.

In 1728 and 1780 there were great fires in the town. The fire of 1728 destroyed the vicarage of St. Stephen together with its church. Donations enabled it to be rebuilt in 1734 in the baroque style. In 1780 the fire devastated the market area as far as the Schuhhof.

In 1762 under the lawyer, Dr. Jakob Gottlieb Sieber, Goslar fell even further than before into debt and mismanagement. Following a visit to the town in 1777 Goethe characterized it "an imperial town that rots in and with its privileges."

In 1802 the Kingdom of Prussia took possession of Goslar in compensation for territories it had lost east of the Rhine. In 1803 Goslar officially lost its imperial immediacy at the Reichsdeputationshauptschluss.

== Provincial town – spa – retirement resort (1803–1918) ==
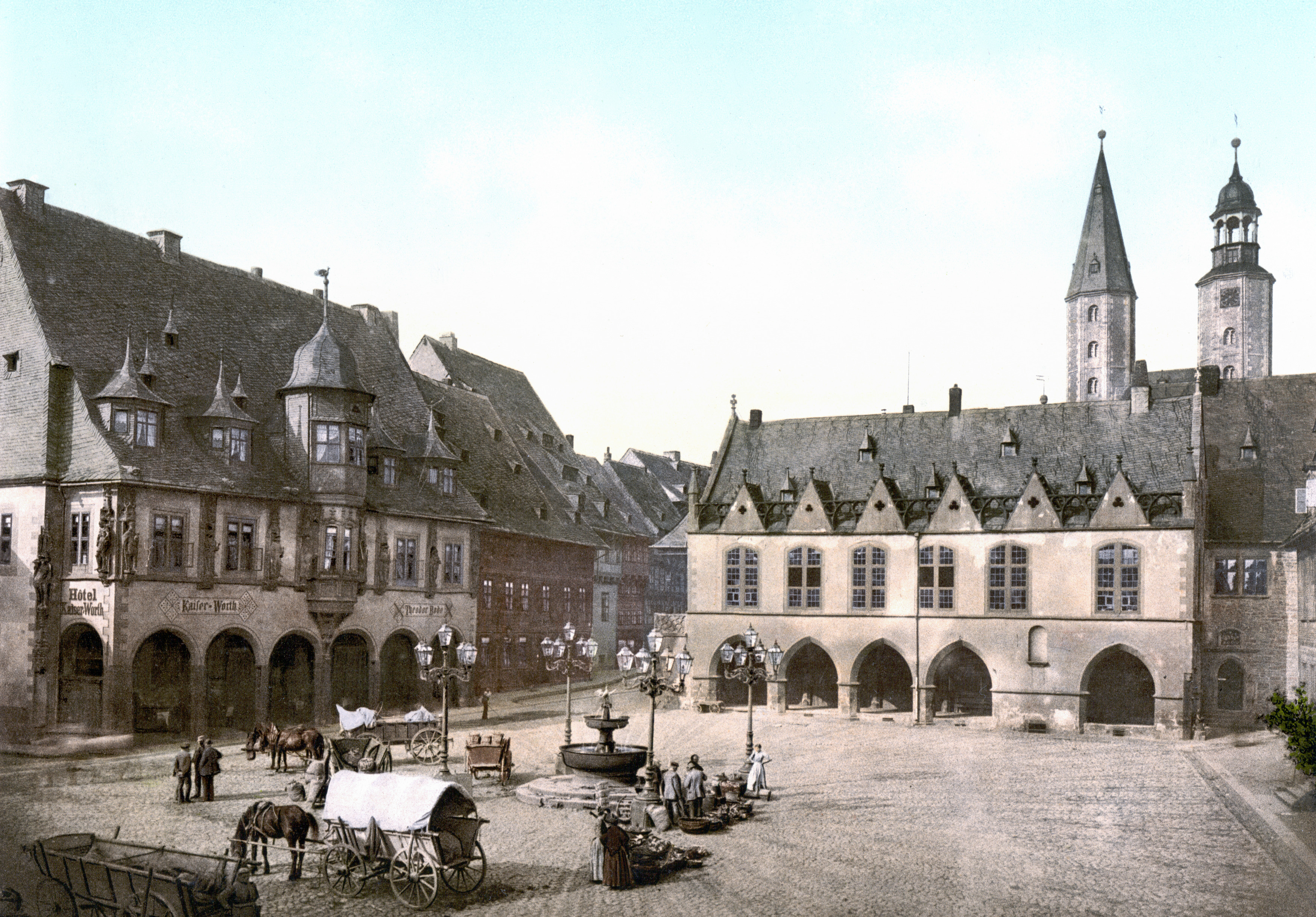
The town hall, market place and Hotel Kaiserworth around 1895

The Siemens reforms were further strengthened and developed by Prussian councillor, Christian von Dohm.

After the Prussian defeat in the 1806/07 War of the Fourth Coalition, Goslar fell to the Kingdom of Westphalia until it was retaken in 1813 by Prussia. During the Congress of Vienna Goslar was a pawn between the Kingdom of Hanover and Prussia, but after some interplay went to Hanover. At the time Goslar was an impoverished provincial town with a small garrison of riflemen (Jäger).

In 1819 Goslar Cathedral was sold for demolition and, in 1820–22, it was torn down apart from the porch. Heinrich Heine, who visited Goslar, full of expectation, as part of his Harz journey in 1824, wrote of his disappointment: "We live in a portentous time: thousand-year old cathedrals are demolished and the Imperial Throne of Goslar is thrown into a junk room." In other ways too, Goslar felt Heine's ironic ferocity and scorn: "I found a nest full of narrow, labyrinthine roads, [...] and cobblestones as bumpy as a Berlin hexameter. [...] the town of Goslar is a white-painted guardroom.".“

The town experienced a boom, first through shoemaker, Frederick Lamp, who established a well-known herbal spa in Goslar in 1842. Amongst his spa guests were the Hanoverian royal family. About 4,000 patients visited the spa annually until Lampe's death on 1 April 1866.

After the Austro-Prussian War of 1866 Goslar became part of the new Prussian Province of Hanover and was a popular retirement resort for retired city dwellers. Citizens of Berlin, Hanover and Braunschweig had villas built at Steinberg and Georgenberg, especially during the heyday of the Gründerzeit. Historical fervour encouraged by the House of Hohenzollern resulted in the restoration of the Imperial Palace in 1868 and it was developed into a national monument. The First World War and subsequent turmoil curbed this phase.

== 1000 year celebrations and "Imperial Peasants' Town" (1922–1945) ==
Although the town's 1,000th anniversary was still celebrated in 1922 with a large public festival, parallel interpretations of the Riechenberg Treaty and Treaty of Versailles proved to be harbingers of things to come. That conservative forces in certain parts of the population were stronger than the will to have a democratic system was demonstrated by the case of the Goslar school in 1929 when a black, red and gold trophy was rejected at a school sports competition.

Unemployment after the economic collapse of the 1930s tipped Goslar into the clutches of the Nazi Party. In 1934 Richard Walther Darré decided that Goslar would become the headquarters of the Reichsnährstand ("Reich Farmers' Union") and, in 1936, he elevated the town to be the Reichsbauernstadt ("Reich Farmers' Town"). In addition to developments at the site of the Reichsbauernstand ("Reich farmers"), which amounted to little more than providing a curtain-raiser to the Heinrich Himmler cult at the Reich's farmers' conferences, the region became increasingly industrialized and mining was advanced with the introduction of new technology.

During the Nazi era the town was also the centre for enterprises and institutions connected with Germany's rearmament. The largest employers were the chemical factory of Borchers A.G./H.C. Starck, the Lower Harz Mining and Smelting Company and Goslar air base. Overall, during the Second World War, about 5,000 people from other European countries, mostly forced labourers, worked in the town and surrounding area. This work force served a total of 61 firms during this period. The local society Spurensuche Goslar deals with research into this chapter of history.

The fate of Goslar Jews who were persecuted and deported during the Nazi era has been captured in a publication by Hans Donald Karmen.

Goslar survived the Second World War without any great destruction. A timely surrender resulted in the Reichsbauernstadt being handed over intact to the Americans.

== After 1945 ==
After the end of the Second World War in 1945 Goslar found itself in the British Zone of Occupation. The British military administration set up a DP camp to accommodate so-called displaced persons (DP). The camp was looked after by a team (Team 2913) from the UNRRA.

The number of refugees made expansion of the town necessary. The border location of the town inhibited industry, instead the town received border installations and garrisons for the troops of the Bundesgrenzschutz and the Bundeswehr.

From 20 to 22 October 1950 the Christian Democratic Union of Germany was founded and held its first ever party conference in Goslar, under the slogan "Unity and justice and freedom" (Einigkeit und Reicht und Freiheit). At that time Goslar was chosen as the venue ahead of Berlin, Frankfurt and Heidelberg. Konrad Adenauer was elected party leader on 21 October, with 302 of the 335 votes.

In the 1960s and 1970s, the first south European Gastarbeiter came to Goslar and worked primarily in the firms of Odermark and the Lower Harz Mining and Smelting Works, later Preussag AG Metall.

With the opening of the border in 1989 and the German reunification in 1990, Goslar moved back to the heart of Germany.

The ore mine in the Rammelsberg (635 m above sea level) was shut down in 1988. It now houses the Rammelsberg Museum and Visitors Mine.

Since 1992 the mediaeval Old Town of Goslar and the Rammelsberg have been on UNESCO's list of cultural and natural heritage sites for humanity (see World Heritage Sites). Since 2010, this has also included the Upper Harz Water Regale, the Walkenried Abbey and the historic Samson Pit.

== See also ==
Harz History - the Stone Age at www.harzgeschichte.
