= Hez =

Hez or HEZ may refer to:

== Places ==
- Hez Forest (French: Forêt de Hez), Picardy, Hauts-de-France, France; see List of forests in France
- Natchez–Adams County Airport (IATA airport code HEZ), Natchez, Adams County, Mississippi, USA

== People and characters ==
- Hezekiah Walker (born 1962; nicknamed "Hez"), U.S. pastor and musician
- Hez, a fictional character from the 1929 film The Shannons of Broadway

== Groups, organizations ==
- Hez, short for Hezbollah
- Arrow Aviation (ICAO airline code HEZ); see List of airline codes (A)

== Other uses ==
- hezuolinite (mineral symbol Hez), a sorosilicate mineral (Sr,REE)_{4}Zr(Ti,Fe^{3+},Fe^{2+})_{2}Ti_{2}O_{8}(Si_{2}O_{7})_{2}; see List of mineral symbols
- Haupteinflugzeichen (abbreviated: HEZ), a radio beacon used for aviation blind approach instrument landing in the Lorenz beam system

== See also ==
- Grand Hez, Bouillon, Belgium
- La Neuville-en-Hez (French: The Newtown in Hez), Oise, Picardy, Hauts-de-France, France; a village in Hez Forest
- Hezbollah (disambiguation)
- Hezekiah (disambiguation)
- Heze (disambiguation)
