= Imperial Palace of Goslar =

Palace of the Holy Roman Empire in Germany

Coordinates: 51°54′10″N 10°25′33″E

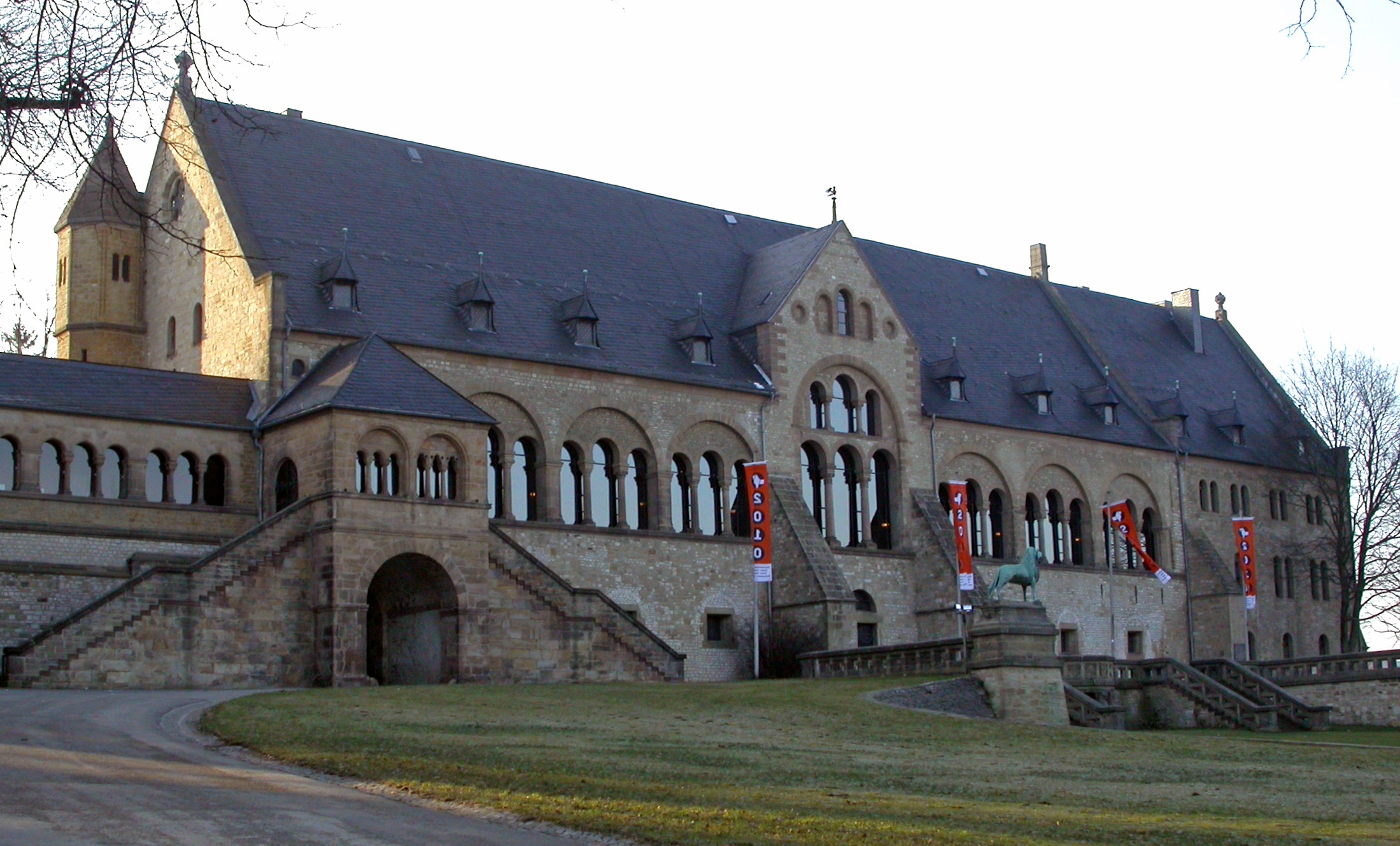
The Kaiserhaus of the Imperial Palace

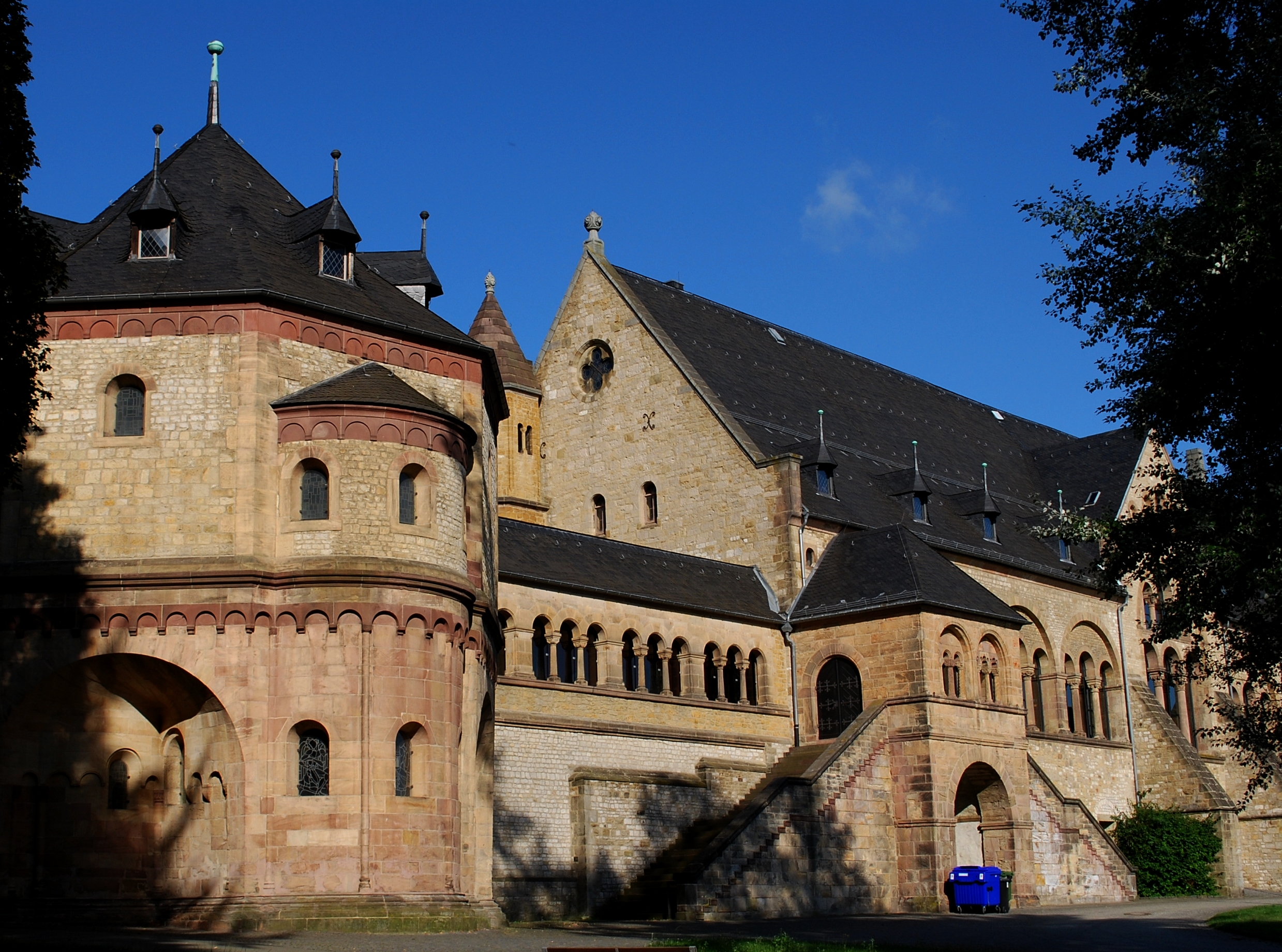
St. Ulrich chapel at the Kaiserpfalz

The Imperial Palace of Goslar (German: Kaiserpfalz Goslar) is a historical building complex at the foot of the Rammelsberg hill in the south of the town of Goslar north of the Harz mountains, central Germany. It covers an area of about 340 by 180 metres. The palace grounds originally included the Kaiserhaus, the old collegiate church of St. Simon and St. Jude, the palace chapel of St. Ulrich and the Church of Our Lady (Liebfrauenkirche). The Kaiserhaus, which has been extensively restored in the late 19th century, was a favourite imperial residence, especially for the Salian emperors. As early as the 11th century, the buildings of the imperial palace had already so impressed the chronicler Lambert of Hersfeld that he described it as the "most famous residence in the empire". Since 1992, the palace site, together with the Goslar's Old Town and the Rammelsberg has been a UNESCO World Heritage Site because of its millennium-long association with mining and testimony to the exchange and advancement of mining technology throughout history.

== Location ==
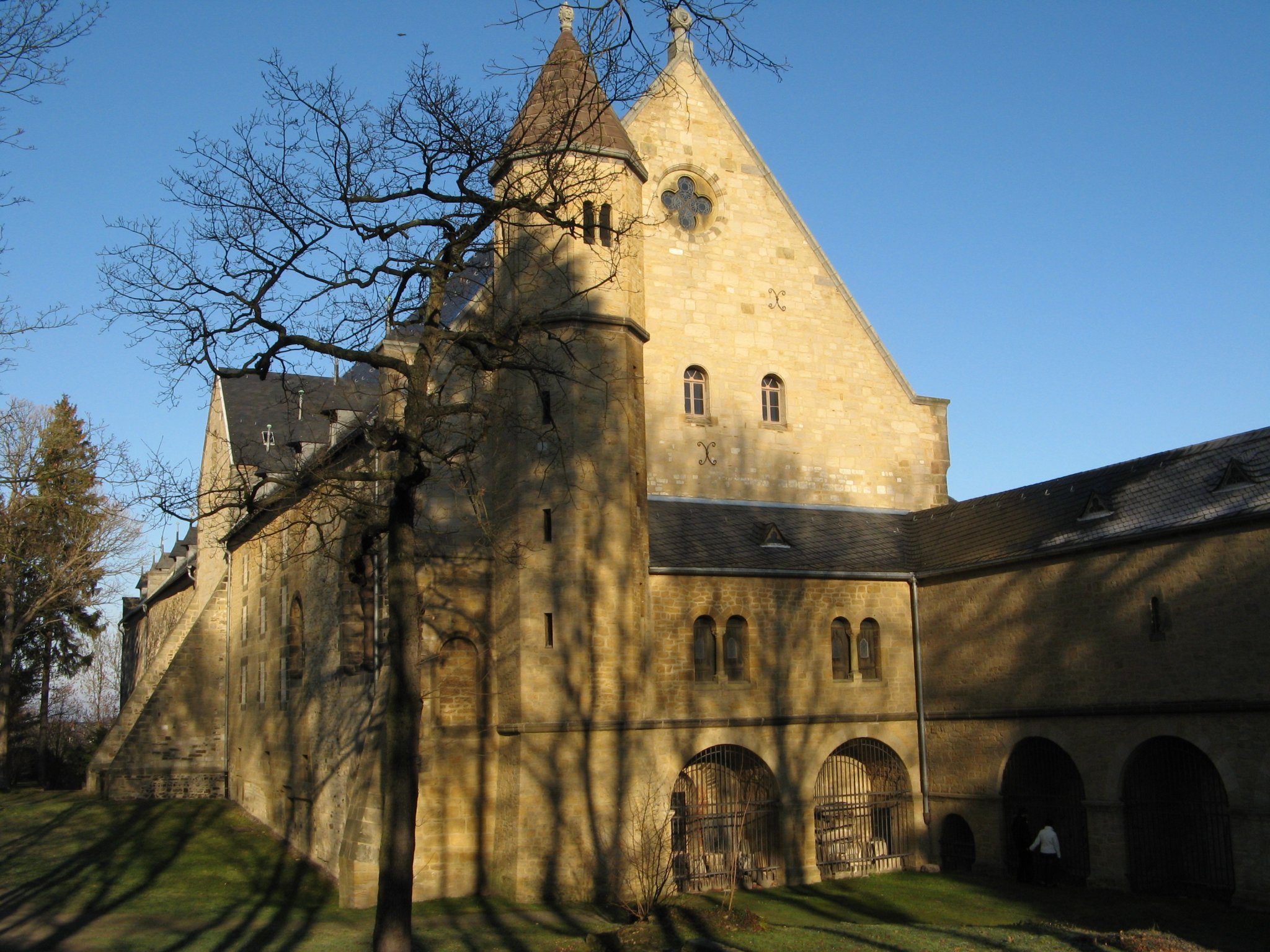
Rear of the Kaiserhaus

The palace district is located in the southern part of the town of Goslar. The area is dominated on the west by the north–south oriented Kaiserhaus, the central building of the whole complex. To the north, it was once joined at right angles by the Church of Our Lady, separated by a small courtyard, but there is nothing left of the church today. Its foundations are under the path leading up to the Kaiserhaus. To the south, now connected by a 19th-century arcade to the Kaiserhaus, is the Chapel of St. Ulrich. To the east, opposite the Kaiserhaus stood the east–west aligned collegiate church of St. Simon and St. Jude, of which only the north porch remains. The plan of the church is, however, incorporated into the surface of the present-day car park. To the palace grounds belonged also the residential and working buildings of the canons, the houses of the ministeriales and the imperial entourage, the stables and storehouses. In addition, the whole area was surrounded by a wall.

== Individual buildings in the palace district ==
The earliest origins of the imperial palace are probably in a royal hunting lodge, as Adam of Bremen mentioned for the Ottonian period. In 1005 Henry II erected a first imperial mansion in Goslar, which, due to the rich ore deposits under the nearby Rammelsberg, soon outstripped the nearby palace of Werla. In the 1030s Conrad II began to expand the site by laying the foundation stone for the Church of Our Lady. The district was completed and enjoyed its heyday under his son, Henry III. In 1048 Henry summoned to Goslar one of the foremost architects of his day, a man who later became Bishop of Osnabrück, Benno II. Under Benno's expert guidance the buildings that had been worked on since the 1040s were completed in the first half of the 1050s: a new Kaiserhaus, the one that we know today, and the Collegiate Church of St. Simon and St. Jude. Uncertain, however, is the date of the chapel dedicated to Saint Ulrich. It is believed to have been built either during the time of Henry III, Henry V or even Lothar III (from Süpplingenburg).

=== The Kaiserhaus ===
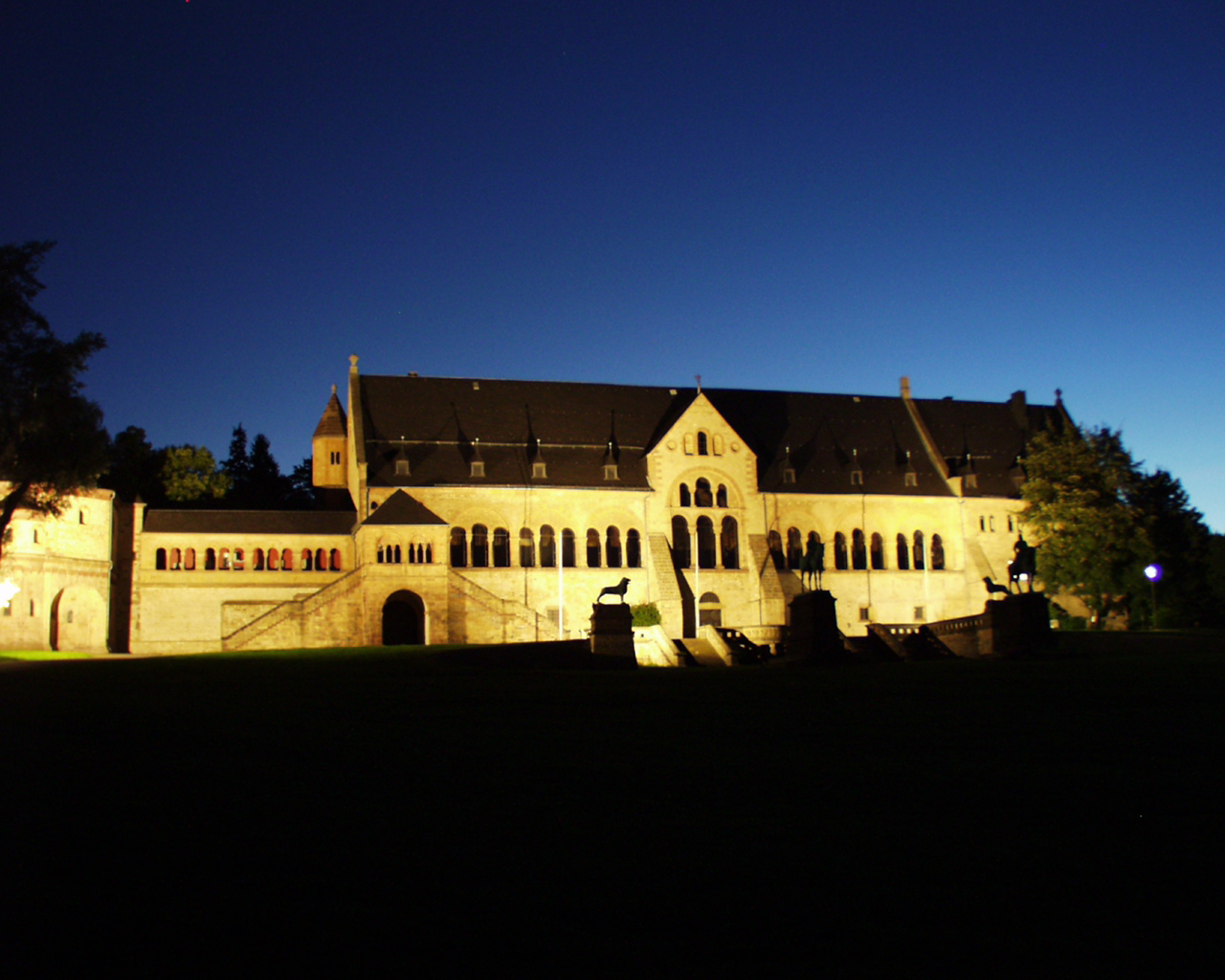
The Kaiserhaus at night

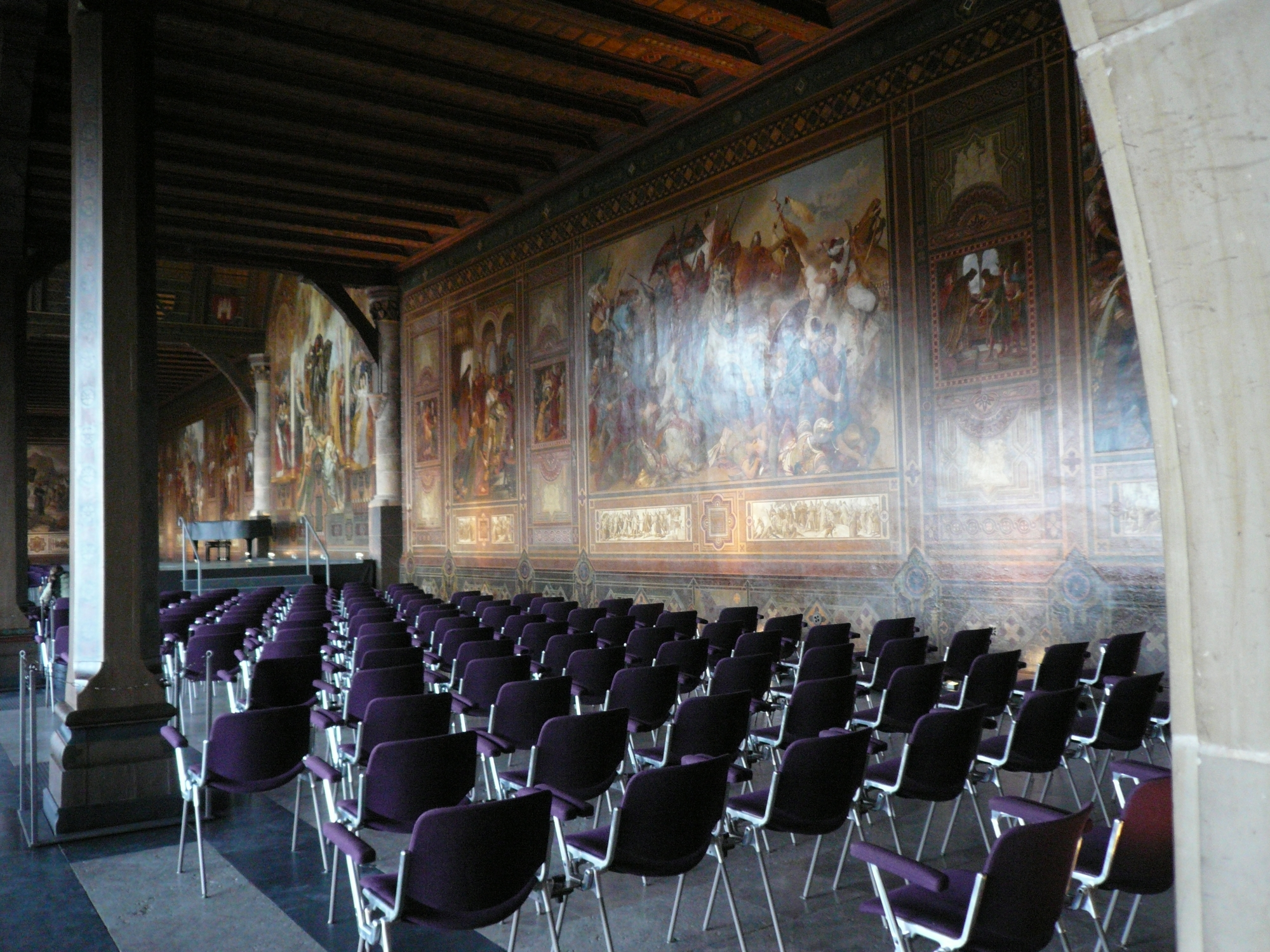
The imperial hall (Kaisersaal)

The Kaiserhaus is 54 metres long and 18 metres wide and is the largest secular building of its time. The centre of the building is its two-storey hall. This contains two rooms on each floor of 47 metres long and 15 metres wide. Both had a beam ceiling, which was supported in the middle by a row of columns. The upper of the two rooms was reserved for the emperor and his immediate entourage, the lower room for courtiers of lesser rank.

The imperial throne was set in the seven-metre high upper storey in the middle of the closed, rear, west wall. The east wall was pierced by a row of windows and gave a view of almost the entire palace district and the cathedral opposite. The central window of the upper floor also led to a columned balcony, either side of which were three arched windows. Incidentally, none of the window was glazed, as they were on the generally leeward side of the building.

To the north, the hall building was adjoined by another, two-storey residential building. Again, the upper floor was probably reserved for the imperial family. There was direct access from the upper room to the neighbouring Church of Our Lady. The church was probably accessible through a gallery as well.

Under Henry V more structural changes were made to the Kaiserhaus at the beginning of the 12th century. He added the older, almost identical, second living quarters at the southern end of the building. In 1132 the hall collapsed, but was immediately rebuilt. At the same time a cross-section (Quertrakt) was added centrally over the entire height of building, and a porch was built in front of the centre door on the ground floor that served as the first floor balcony. A gable now protruded from the hitherto slate-covered, steeply pitched roof. In addition, some windows were made closable and made a type of floor heating was installed. The window arches of the basement were replaced with rectangular windows.

At the foot of the southern staircase, there are the remains of foundations, that probably belong to the first imperial mansion (Pfalzbau) built by Henry II.

=== Collegiate Church of St. Simon and St. Jude ===
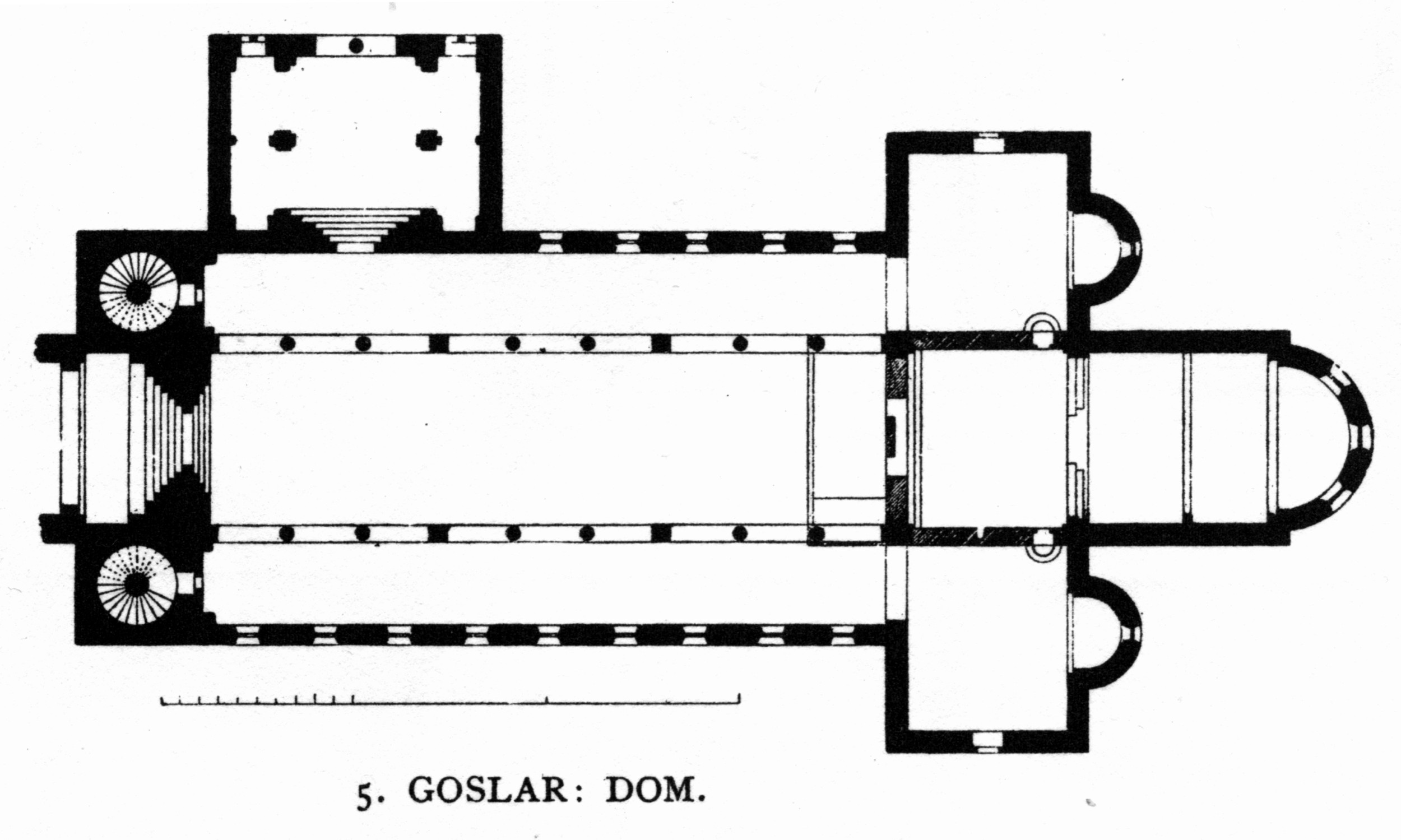
Plan of the Collegiate Church of St. Simon and St. Jude

The canons used to celebrate their services in a three-nave basilica with a transept, three east apses and westwork with two octagonal towers with a bell chamber between them, and a simple narthex. Under the choir was a crypt, and over the intersection was another tower. The church was consecrated on 2 July 1051, by Archbishop Hermann of Cologne and dedicated to Simon the Zealot and Jude the Apostle, whose saint's day coincided with Henry III's birthday. At this time, the basilica was the largest Romanesque church east of the Rhine and became the model for many similar buildings in northern Germany, for example, the Brunswick Cathedral. A number of important religious dignitaries of the empire went out from this church. In 1819, the church, often called Goslar Cathedral, was sold for demolition.

==== Cathedral Porch ====
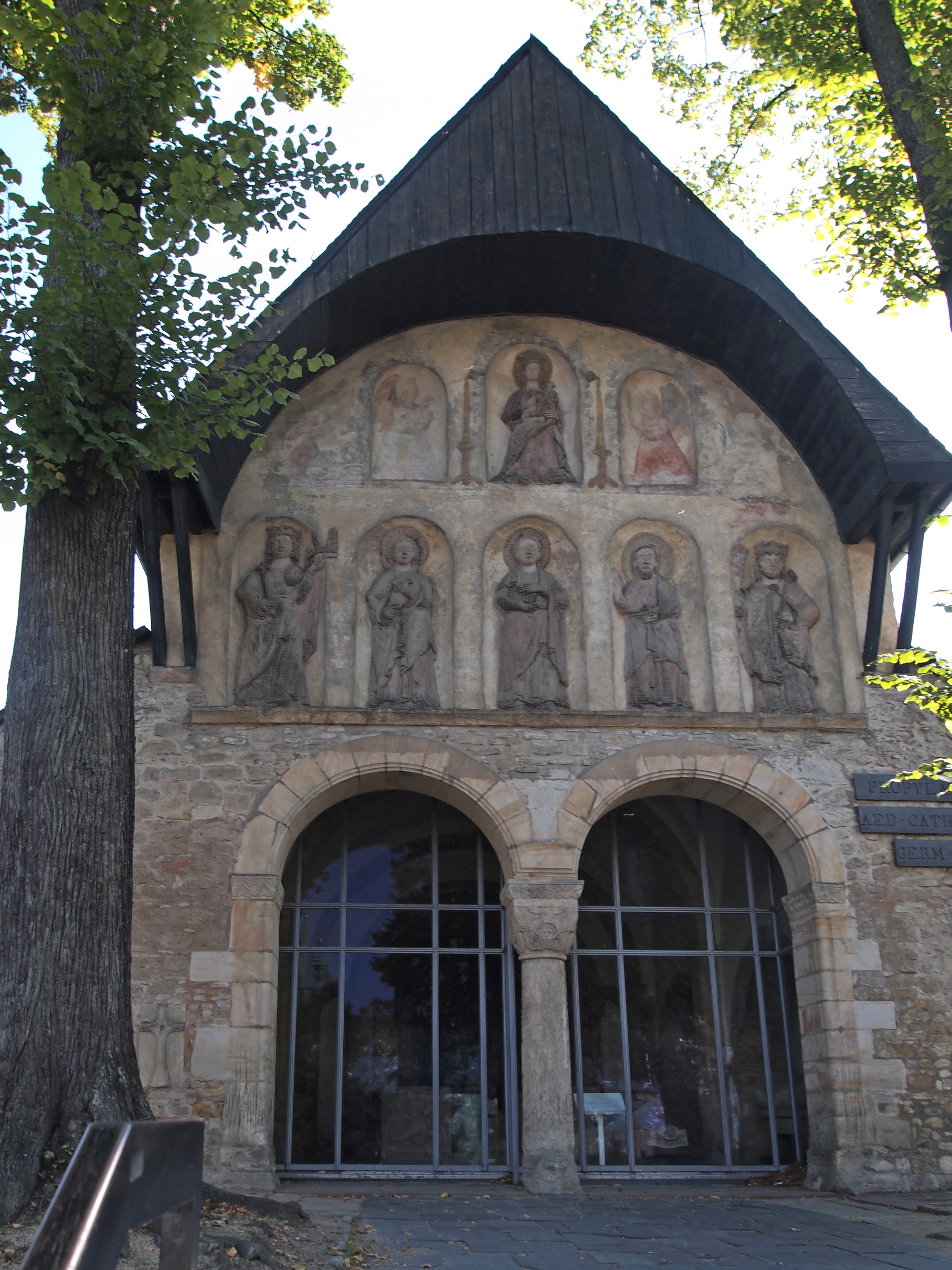
Cathedral Porch

Around 1150 a porch was added in front of the north portal of the church, which remains the only part of the church preserved to this day. The former north door of the cathedral is now the back wall of the porch. The front of the lobby is decorated with two rows of niches with plaster sculptures that were originally coloured. The top row portrays Madonna with child in the middle, surrounded on both sides by chandeliers and angels, the original figures of angels having been lost and replaced by paintings. The bottom row shows, from left to right, Emperor Henry III, the patron saint of the cathedral, Simon, Matthew and Jude, as well as another, not clearly identifiable, imperial figure.

In this hall today is a replica of the imperial throne (Kaiserstuhl), which was originally in the church. The original is in the vaults of the palace. The bronze side arms and backrest, which are ornamented with tendrils, date to the second half of the 11th century, whilst the sandstone plinths surrounding the actual seat are somewhat more recent. They are decorated by Romanesque animal figures and legendary creatures. The imperial throne was probably used by Henry IV. Apart from the throne of Charlemagne in Aachen, it is the only surviving throne of a Holy Roman emperor from the Middle Ages. It was purchased in the 1840s by Prince Charles of Prussia and placed in the medieval-style monastery (Klosterhof) of Glienicke Palace in Potsdam. It subsequently came into the possession of the Hohenzollerns and was used as the imperial chair for Emperor William I at the opening of the first meeting of the new German Reichstag on 21 March 1871.

=== Palace Chapel of St. Ulrich ===
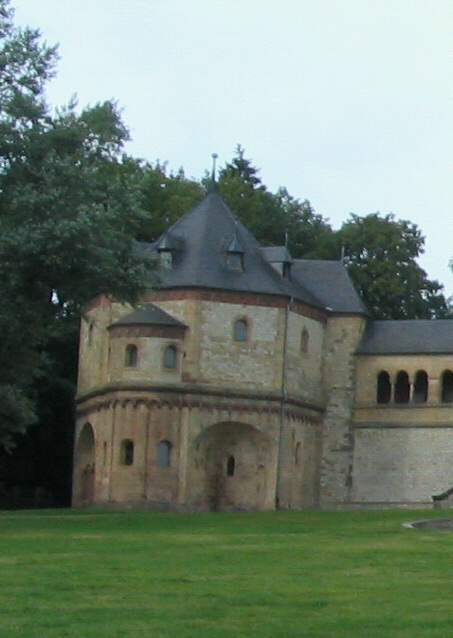
Chapel of St. Ulrich

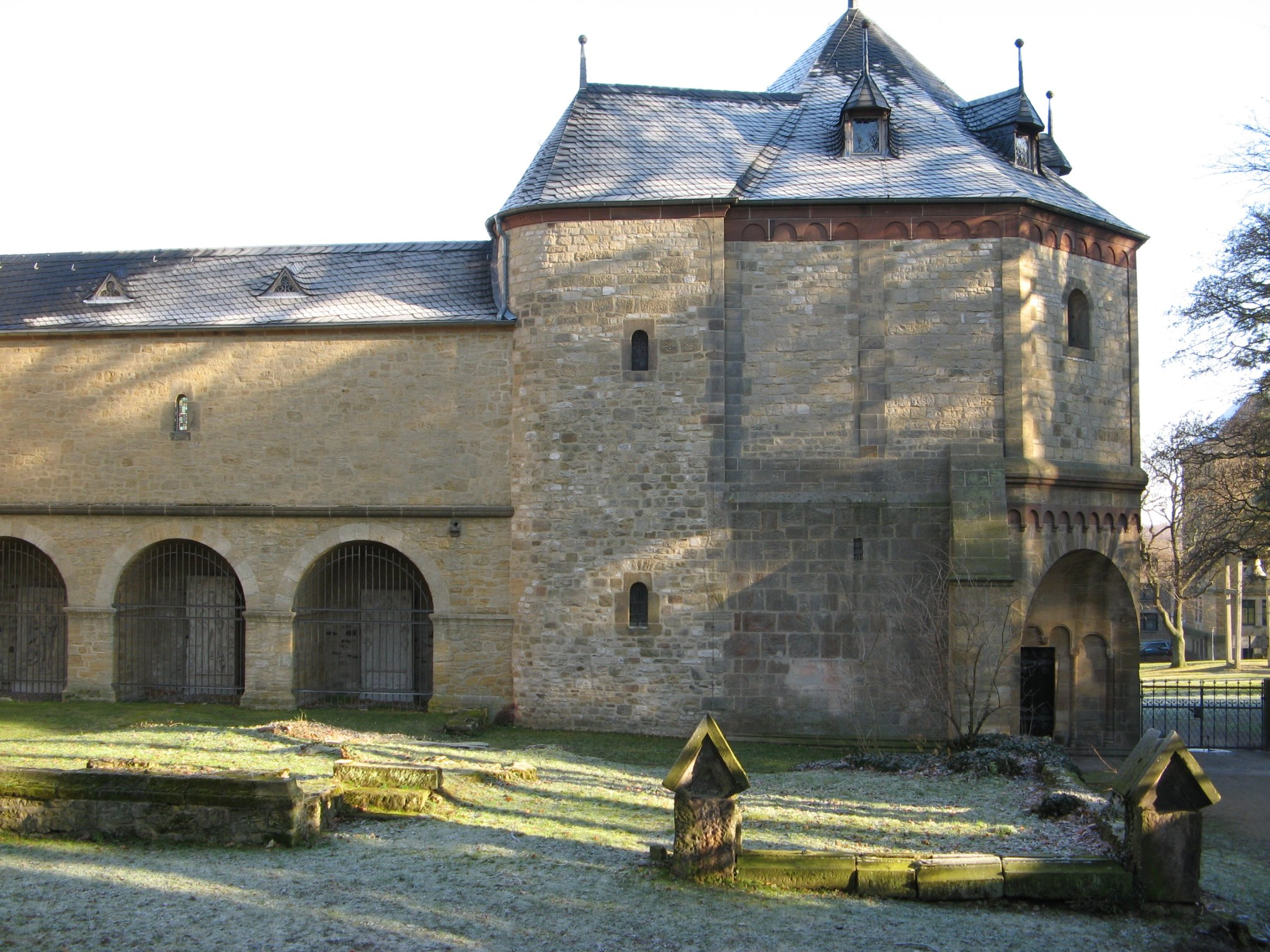
Rear of the chapel

The plan of the double chapel of St. Ulrich forms a so-called Greek cross, with equal arms and three east apses in the lower chapel. The upper chapel, however, is octagonal with only one eastern apse. Such a design is unique in Germany. A square opening above the cross connects the lower chapel with the upper one that was originally reserved for the imperial family. The two chapels are also connected by a stair tower that is nearly in between the north and the west arm of the cross. From this tower was the chapel Ulrich also by a walkway to the southern, younger, connected living room of the imperial family.

Today a sarcophagus stands right in the centre of the cross in the lower chapel, whose cover slab has a sculpture dating to about the middle of the 13th century. This is a life-size, horizontal figure of Henry III, his head on a pillow, a dog lying at his feet, in his right hand the sceptre, in his left, the model of a church. The sarcophagus contains (in an octagonal gold capsule) the heart of Henry III, which was interred in Goslar at his own request, and has been kept since 1884 in the Chapel of St. Ulrich.

=== Church of Our Lady ===
The Church of Our Lady (Liebfrauenkirche), actually the Palace Chapel of "Sanctae Mariae Virginis", or just St. Mary's Chapel (Marienkapelle) consisted of a central square building of about 10 metres length, onto which were joined the three eastern apses and, on the opposite side, of a westwork with two round towers. The building was two storeys high. The ground floor, with access on the south side, was for the "ordinary staff". The upper storey, probably designed with marble floor, was reserved, once again, for the imperial family and had a direct connection to the Kaiserhaus from the westwork.

=== Curia buildings ===
Curia buildings also belonged to the palace district. They were like, for example, the Vicariate Curia in the "Domburg," the closer collegiate church grounds that were surrounded by a wall. Other curia buildings, such as the "von Steinberg" and "Herlinberg" bordered the square known as the Kaiserbleek to the north and south of between the collegiate church and the Kaiserhaus.

=== Parish church of St. Thomas ===
In the northeastern corner of the Domburg was St. Thomas' Church, built in the 11th century. It was the parish church of the palace district.

== Historical events ==
A number of significant historical events have taken place in the palace district including:

- On 11 November 1050 Henry IV was born here.
- In the late summer of 1056 Pope Victor II was the guest of Henry III for several weeks in the Imperial Palace. He was present at his death in Bodfeld in the Harz and then organized the transfer of power to Henry's widow, Empress Agnes.
- At Pentecost in 1063, the Goslar Precedence Dispute led to a bloodbath in the cathedral, which was witnessed by the young Henry IV. A dispute broke out between Bishop Hezilo of Hildesheim and Abbot Widerad of Fulda over the seating arrangements, which ended in a half-day-long, bloody carnage.
- In summer 1073 Henry IV had to escape from the Imperial Palace to the nearby castle of Harzburg to flee the Saxon rebels.
- At Christmas 1075 Henry IV received in Goslar a letter from Pope Gregory VII, in which he threatened him with excommunication, thus starting the Investiture Controversy.
- In 1081 the antiking to Henry IV, Hermann of Salm, was crowned and anointed in the palace.
- Between 1152 and 1188, the Imperial Palace was at times both the venue for, and at times the cause of, the dispute between Emperor Frederick I and Duke Henry the Lion.
- In July 1219 Frederick II held an Imperial Diet (German Reichstag) at the Imperial Palace and on that occasion received the Imperial Regalia, that Otto IV had kept at the Harzburg.

== Ruin and restoration ==
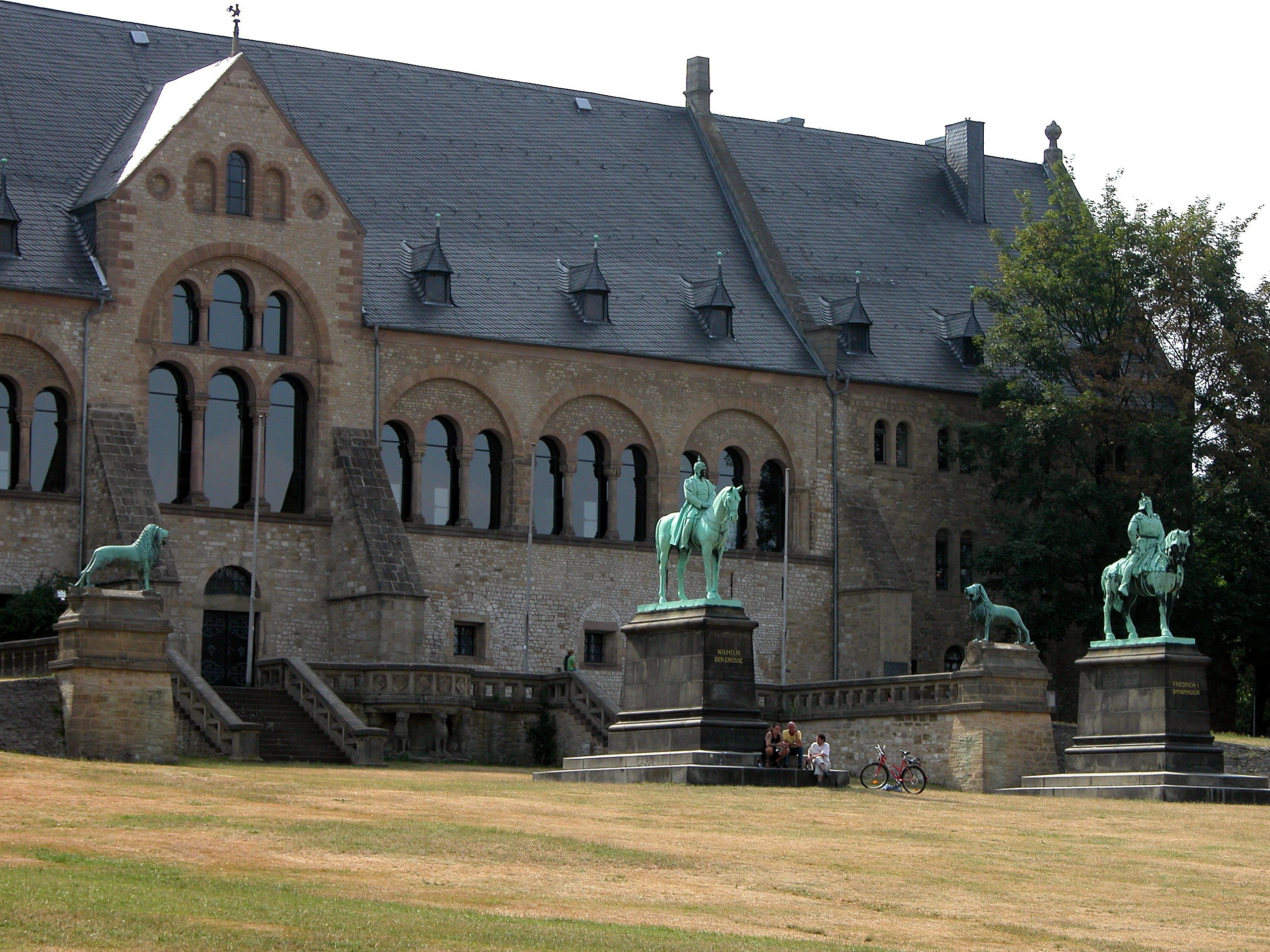
Replicas of the Brunswick Lions in front of the Imperial Palace

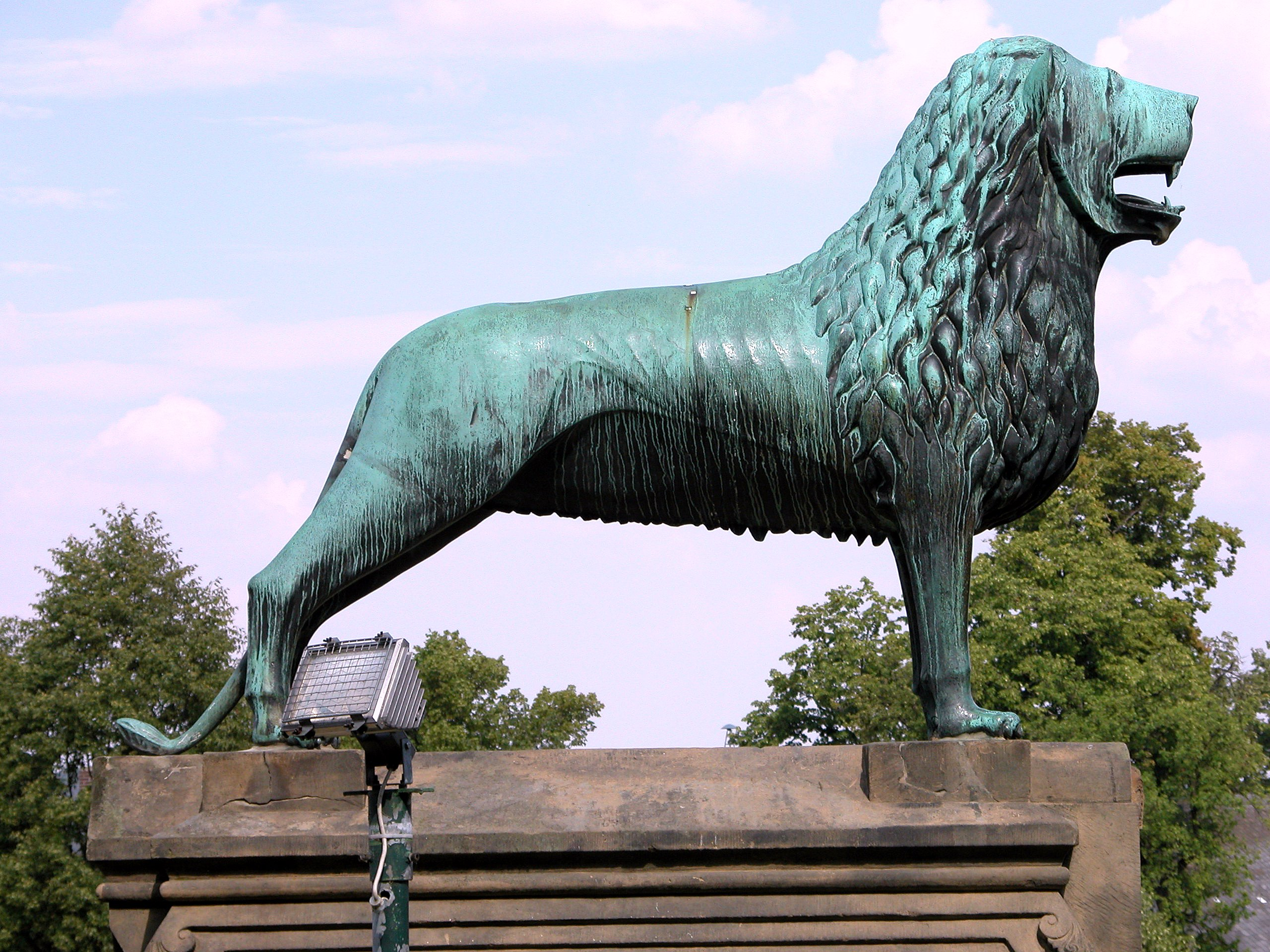
One of the replicas

1253 was the last time a German king, William of Holland, resided at the palace. Thereafter it fell into decline. In 1289 a fire razed many of the buildings to the ground. The newest residential building was then demolished to its foundations. The following year the palaced district went into the possession of the town of Goslar. The hall was used for a long time as a court, partly by Goslar's sheriff (Stadtvogt) and partly as a Saxon district court, but was increasingly "abused" as a warehouse or store. For example, both the halls of the Kaiserhaus and the older living quarters were used in the mid-16th century as a granary. The Chapel of St. Ulrich was used as a prison from 1575, something which at least helped to preserve it. The towers of the Church of Our Lady collapsed in 1672, and the rest of the church in 1722. Its stones were used as building material. The walls of the cathedral were already reported in 1331 as collapsing and, in 1530, a tower fell down. In 1802 only a ruin was left, which was sold on 19 July 1819 for 1504 talers for demolition. Only the north portal remains and still gives an impression of the former grandeur of the cathedral.

In 1865 walls in the Kaiserhaus again fell down and the possibility of demolition was on the agenda of Goslar's Town Council. This was averted and, instead, a state commission recommended that the building be restored. Construction work began on 14 August 1868. On 15 August 1875 Emperor William I paid a visit to the site and gave the project in effect a "national blessing". In 1879 the restoration of the building was completed.

In the years 1913/14 and again in 1922 archaeological investigations in the palace district were carried out by Professor Uvo Hölscher, thanks to which the foundations of the Church of Our Lady were re-discovered.

== The palace today ==
The Imperial Palace is one of the most outstanding tourist attractions in the town of Goslar and the Harz region. The Kaiserhaus may be visited daily and guided tours are available, whilst, the old quarters are used for administrative purposes and exhibitions. In addition, in the Goslar Museum (town museum), there are exhibits from the palace district, especially from the Monastery of St. Simon and St. Jude, for example, the Krodo Altar and a number of stained glass windows.

Since 1992, the palace district, together with Goslar's Old Town and the Rammelsberg Mine have been designated as a World Heritage Site by UNESCO. Henry Moore's sculpture, Goslar Warrior 1973–1974 has stood in the palace gardens since 1975. It was named for the town after Moore received Goslar's Goslarer Kaiserring art prize in 1975. On warmer summer evenings the large meadow around the two statues in front of the Imperial Palace used to be a popular meeting place for all kinds of people. Today there is a ban on alcohol and assembly anywhere in the palace grounds.

== See also ==
- High medieval domes

== Sources ==
- Carl Wolff (Hrsg.): Die Kunstdenkmäler der Provinz Hannover. Bd. II, 1 u. 2, Stadt Goslar, Hannover 1901
- Hans-Georg Uhl: Die Kaiserpfalz Goslar. 2. Auflage. Stadtverwaltung, Goslar 1958
- Uvo Hölscher: Die Kaiserpfalz zu Goslar (Kleine Kunstführer für Niedersachsen, Heft 14). 3. Auflage. Musterschmidt, Göttingen 1969. [Nachdruck von 1996, ISBN 3-89534-175-4]
- Monika Arndt: Die Goslarer Kaiserpfalz als Nationaldenkmal. Eine ikonographische Untersuchung. Lax, Hildesheim 1976, ISBN 3-7848-4011-6
- Monika Arndt: Der Weißbart auf des Rotbarts Throne. Mittelalterliches und preußisches Kaisertum in den Wandbildern des Goslarer Kaiserhauses. Goltze, Göttingen 1977
- Domkirche – Ehemalige Stiftskirche St. Simon und Juda. In: Helga Wäß: Form und Wahrnehmung mitteldeutscher Gedächtnisskulptur im 14. Jahrhundert. 2 Bde., Tenea, Berlin 2006. Band 2: Katalog ausgewählter Objekte vom Hohen Mittelalter bis zum Anfang des 15. Jahrhunderts. ISBN 3-86504-159-0
- Hans-Günther Griep: Goslars Pfalzbezirk und die Domkurien, Manuskript für Mitglieder des Museumsvereins Goslar e.V., Goslar, 1967
