= Hezi =

Hezi may refer to:

== People ==
- Hezi Bezalel (born 1951), Israeli businessman
- Hezi Eshel (born 1931), retired Israel Defense Forces lieutenant colonel
- Hezi Leskali (1952–1994), Israeli artist
- Hezi Levi, commander of the Israeli Medical Corps from 2002 to 2007
- Hezi Shai (born 1954), Israeli tank commander

== Other uses ==
- Hezi (town) (鹤子镇), Anyuan County, Jiangxi, China
- Hezi SM-1, a variant of the M1 carbine
- Hezi or Dudou, a form of women's undershirt worn in Tang China
- Xu Hezi, main character of the Chinese television series High Flying Songs of Tang Dynasty
- Hēzǐ

== See also ==
- Hezilo of Hildesheim, 11th-century Bishop of Hildesheim
- Hazi (Hazi Aslanov; 1910–1945), Soviet major-general
- Yehezkel (The original version of the name Hezi)
- Hezhe
- Heze (disambiguation)
