= Hezekiah (disambiguation) =

Hezekiah was a king of Judah.

Hezekiah may also refer to (alphabetically, by surname if there is one, including prefixes such as "ben"/"bar"):

- Hezekiah (Amora), Talmud sage of the Amoraim period in the Land of Israel
- Hezekiah (governor) (Yehezqiyah), late 4th-century governor and possibly High Priest of Persian Judah or/and Ptolemaic Judah
- Hezekiah (Khazar), 9th-century Khazar ruler
- Hezekiah (rapper) (active from 1995), American rapper, hip-hop producer, songwriter, and founder of Beat Society
- Hezekiah Linthicum Bateman (1812–1875), 19th-century American actor and manager
- Hezekiah ben Manoah or bar Manoah, rabbi from 13th-century France
- Hezekiah Davis (died 1837), American politician from Pennsylvania
- Hezekiah Gaon, last Gaon of the Yeshiva of Pumbedita, 1038–1040
- Hezekiah Hunter (1837–1894), teacher, minister, and politician.
- Hezekiah Jones, main character of the 1948 poem "Black Cross (Hezekiah Jones)" by Joseph Simon Newman, recorded by Lord Buckley and by Bob Dylan
- Hezekiah Masses (born 2004), American football player
- Chaim Hezekiah Medini (1834–1905), rabbi who worked among the Krymchaks
- Hezekiah Niles (1777–1839), 19th-century American newspaperman
- Hezekiah Ochuka (1953–1987), ruler of Kenya for six hours in 1982
- Hezekiah Bradley Smith (1816–1887), American politician and bigamist
- Hezekiah Walker, American gospel artist

== See also ==
- Hézékia Péron
- All pages containing Hezekiah
