= Imperial Throne of Goslar =

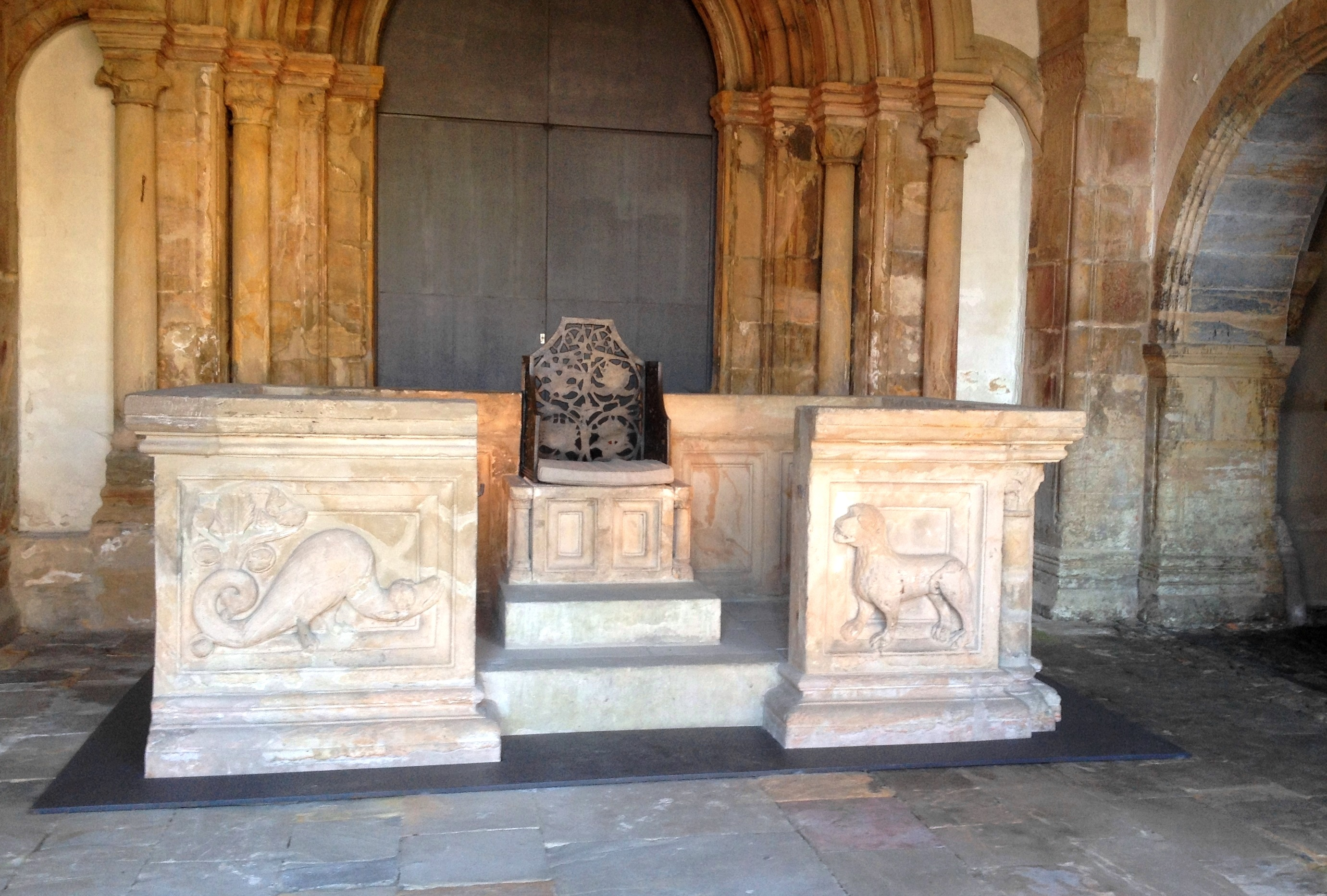
Imperial throne, Goslar: sandstone plinth and enclosure, about 1220, and replica of the bronze parts; porch of St. Simon and Jude

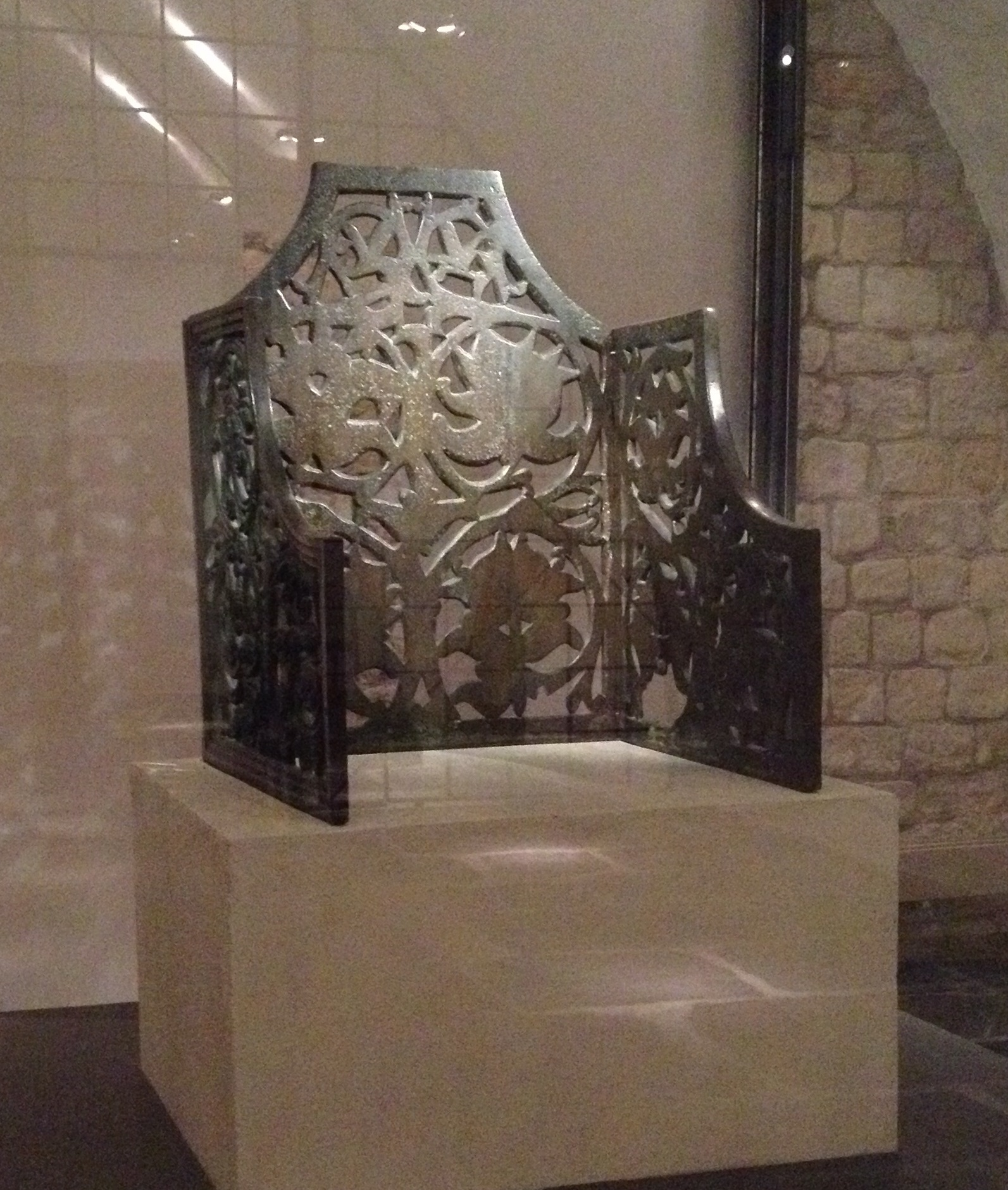
Imperial throne, Goslar: original bronze parts, about 1070; imperial palace

The imperial throne at Goslar (German: Kaiserstuhl Goslar) was made in the second half of the 11th century and was the throne of Holy Roman Emperors and kings in the Collegiate Church of St. Simon and St. Jude ("Goslar Cathedral"), which stood in the grounds of the Imperial Palace of Goslar (Kaiserpfalz Goslar). Along with the Krodo Altar it is one of the most important, surviving artefacts from the demolished cathedral.

The throne comprises three sides (a backrest and two armrests), which were cast from bronze, and a stone plinth with a seat. The metal was mined in the nearby Rammelsberg hill. The cast sides with their luxurious, swirling decorations, pomegranates and pierced palmetto leaves are among the most important Salian bronze castings. The plinth and enclosure of the throne are made of sandstone and date to the 13th century. Its sides are decorated with animal figures and legendary creatures. Apart from the Aachen Throne of Charlemagne in Aachen - whose shape it resembles - the Goslar imperial throne is the only surviving medieval throne of a Holy Roman emperor.

The imperial throne stood in the Collegiate Church until its demolition (1819–1822) and was then sold. Passing through various hands, it came into the possession of Prince Charles of Prussia in 1871 and was used for the last time in an imperial ceremony at the opening of the first Berlin Reichstag as the seat of Emperor William I. Charles left the throne in his will to the town of Goslar. It is now in the vaults of the Imperial Palace of Goslar. The plinth and enclosure with a replica of the bronze parts are in the remaining northern porch of St. Simon and Jude.

== Sources ==
- Griep, Hans-Günther (1988). Goslar – Der Pfalzbezirk, Verlag Goslarsche Zeitung, Goslar.
- Müller, Ursula; Griep, Hans-Günther and Schadach, Volker (2000). Kaiserstadt Goslar, Verlag Volker Schadach, Goslar, ISBN 3-928728-48-2
- Gutmann, Christoph and Schadach, Volker (2002). Kaiserpfalz Goslar, Verlag Volker Schadach, Goslar, ISBN 3-928728-52-0
