= Heze (disambiguation) =

Heze is a prefecture-level city in southwestern Shandong, China.

Heze may also refer to:

- Heze, the proper name of the primary component of the binary star Zeta Virginis in the constellation of Virgo
- Heze Shenhui (684-758), a Chinese Buddhist monk
  - Heze school of Chinese Chan Buddhism during the Tang Dynasty
- Heze, a Type 056 corvette

== See also ==
- Rowwen Hèze, Dutch band
- Hezhe
- Hezi (disambiguation)
