= Widerad of Fulda =

Widerad (died in 1075) was abbot of Fulda Abbey (in the Kingdom of Germany). His dispute over precedence with Bishop Hezilo of Hildesheim contributed to the loss of significant parts of the estates of the abbey.

== Sources ==
- Robinson, I. S. (2003) [1999]. Henry IV of Germany, 1056-1106. Cambridge University Press. ISBN 0-521-54590-0.
- Eldevik, John (2012). Episcopal Power and Ecclesiastical Reform in the German Empire: Tithes, Lordship, and Community, 950–1150. Cambridge University Press. ISBN 978-0-521-19346-7.
