= Goslar Cathedral =

Collegiate church in Goslar, Germany

Coordinates: 51°54′11.7″N 10°25′40.1″E

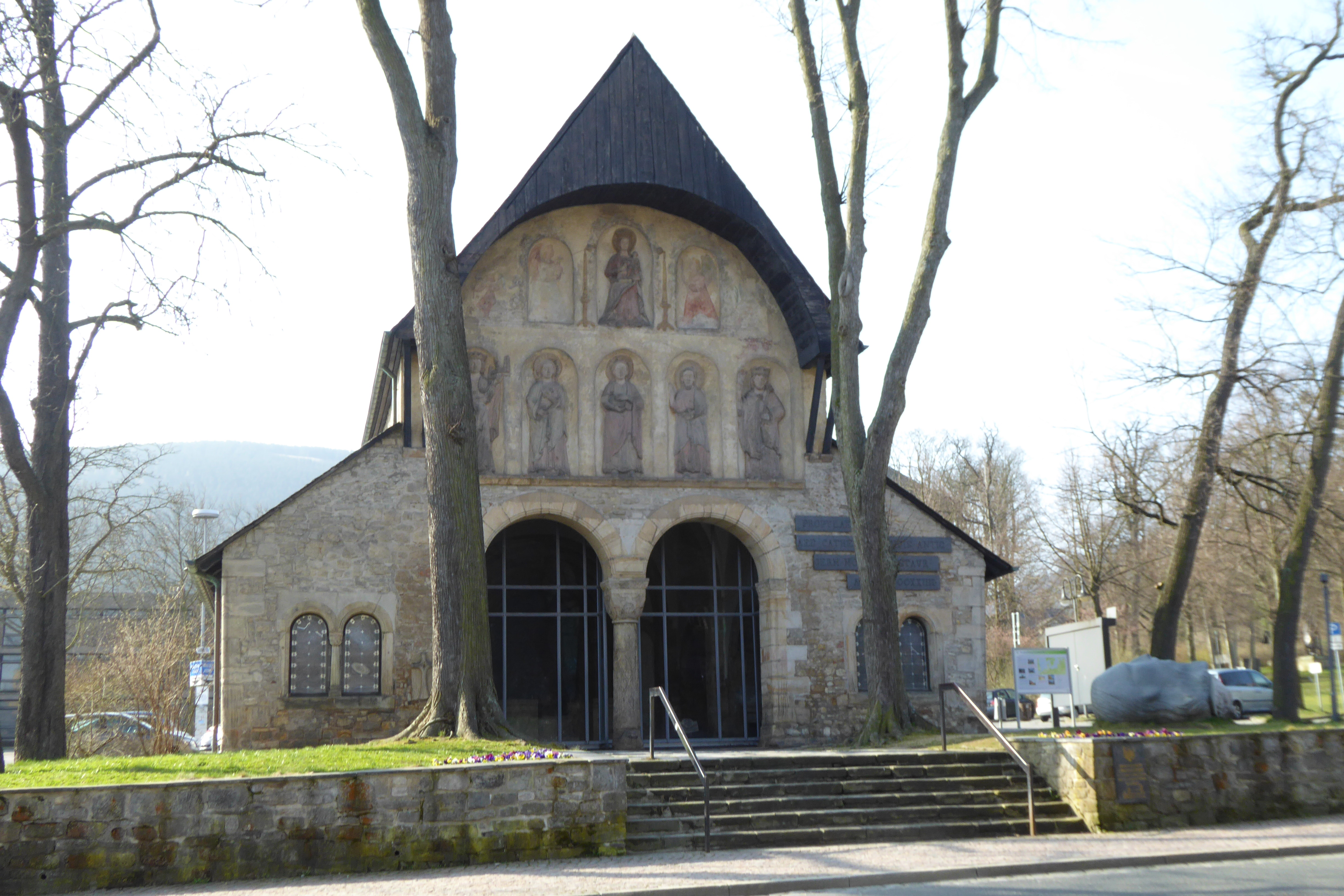
Cathedral porch today

The church known as Goslar Cathedral (German: Goslarer Dom) was a collegiate church dedicated to St. Simon and St. Jude in the town of Goslar, Germany. It was built between 1040 and 1050 as part of the Imperial Palace district. The church building was demolished in 1819–1822; today, only the porch of the north portal is preserved. It was a church of Benedictine canons. The term Dom, a German synecdoche used for collegiate churches and cathedrals alike, is often uniformly translated as 'cathedral' into English, even though this collegiate church was never the seat of a bishop.

== Design ==
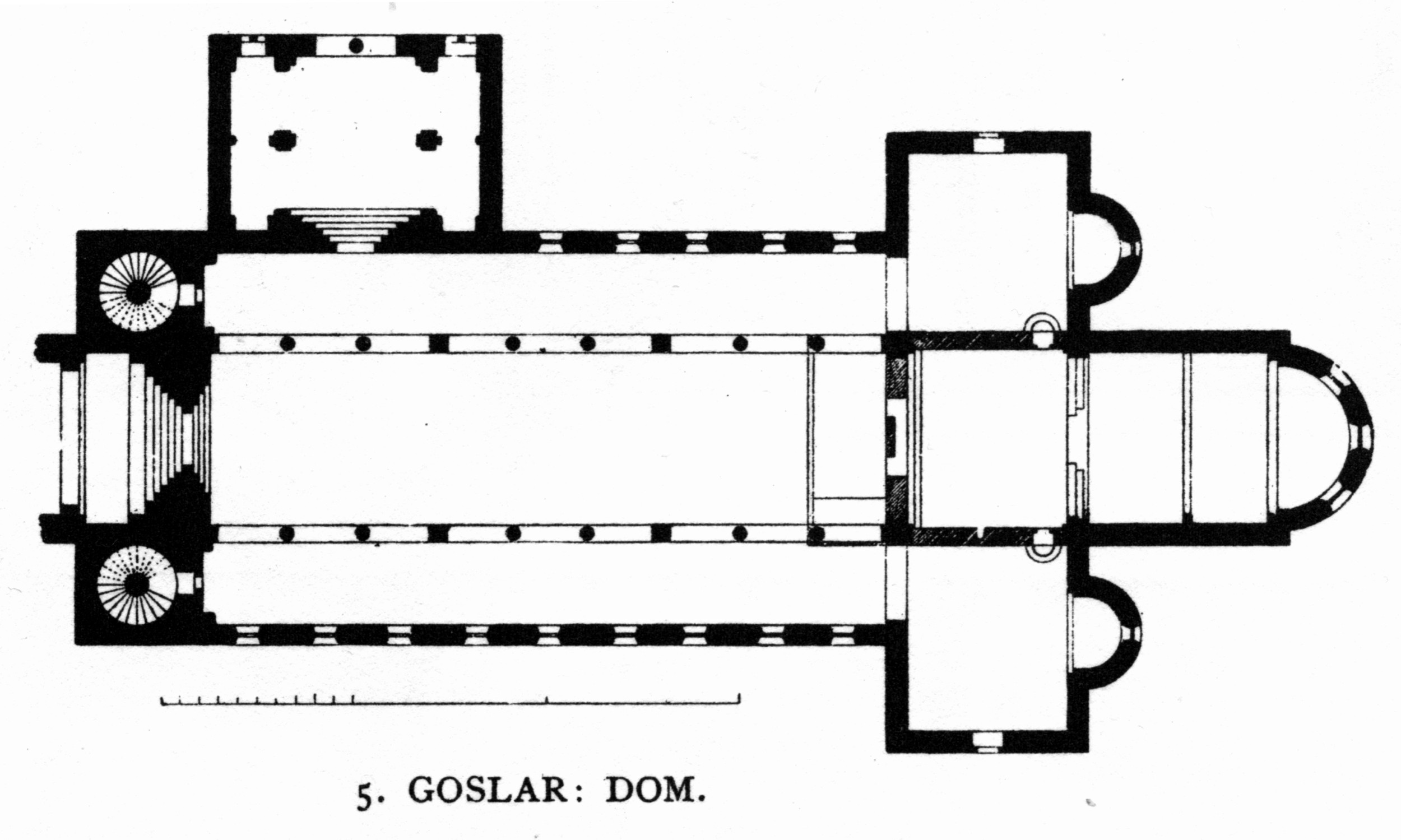
Floor plan with northern porch (upper left)

The collegiate church was built east of the Imperial Palace (Kaiserpfalz). It was thus close connected with other buildings in the area like the Aula regia (Imperial Hall or Kaiserhaus), the Church of Our Lady (demolished), the Chapel of St. Ulrich and the Curia buildings that were all close together. Immediately adjacent to the collegiate church were the cloister and refectory, the chapter and the granarium (granary).

The church was built to a standard design in the shape of a three-nave, initially flat-roofed basilica with a rhythmical ("Rhenish") alternation of piers and columns. The walls were made of limestone blocks. It had a westwork with two low, octagonal towers and the main entrance as well as three eastern apses. The crypt was under the chancel. Above the crossing of nave and transept was another tower. The design of the collegiate church was the prototype for many subsequent church buildings of the Middle Ages.

Amongst the furnishings of the collegiate church were the bronze Krodo Altar and Imperial Throne of Goslar from the 11th century that have survived to the present day.

In the 12th century, the flat roof was replaced by a vaulted roof. The northern porch, now the only surviving part of the building, was added around 1200 and the main entrance re-located here. In the Gothic period the church was further extended to the north with a fourth nave and the chancel was altered.

== History ==
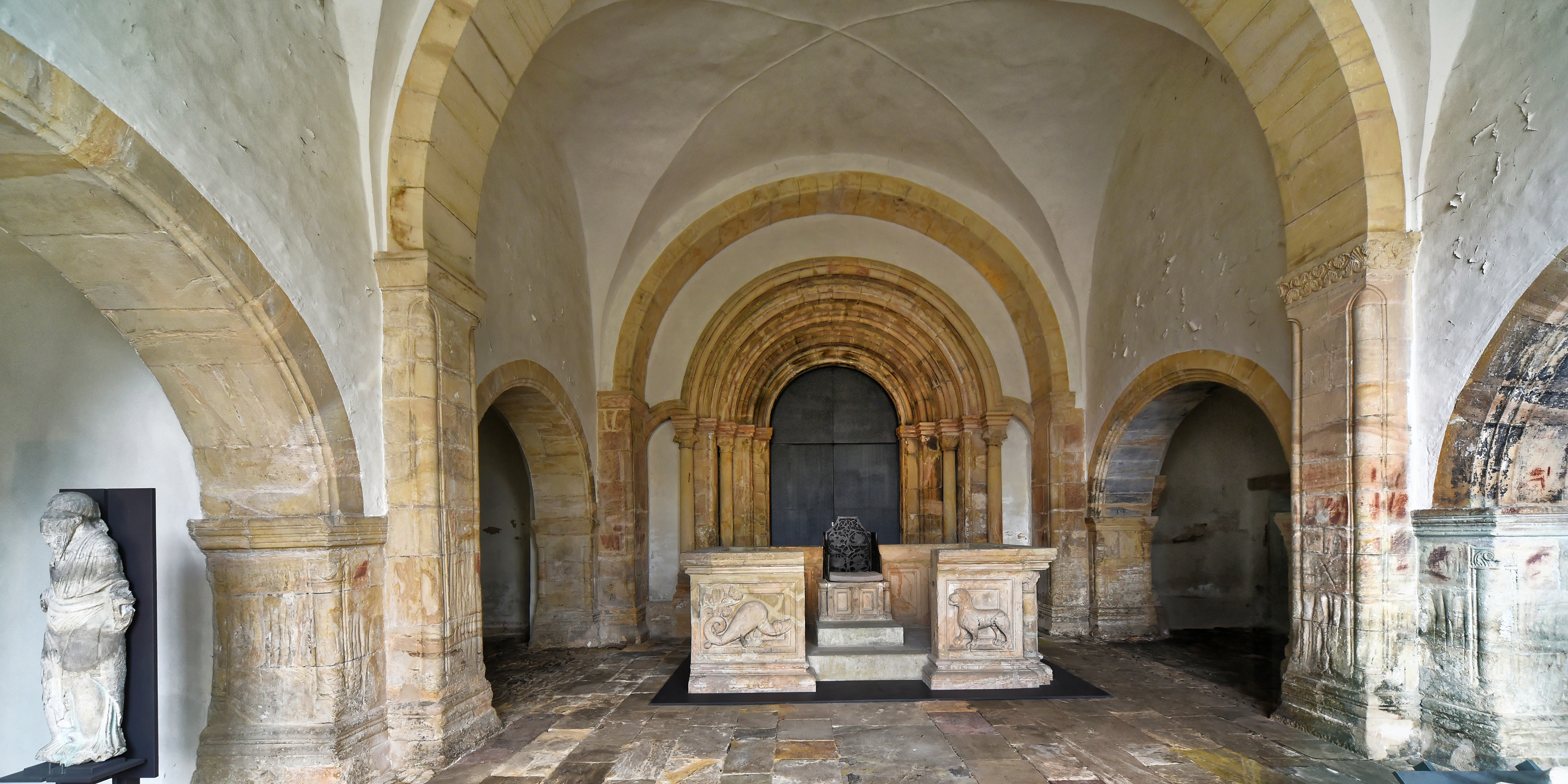
Porch interior with Imperial Throne

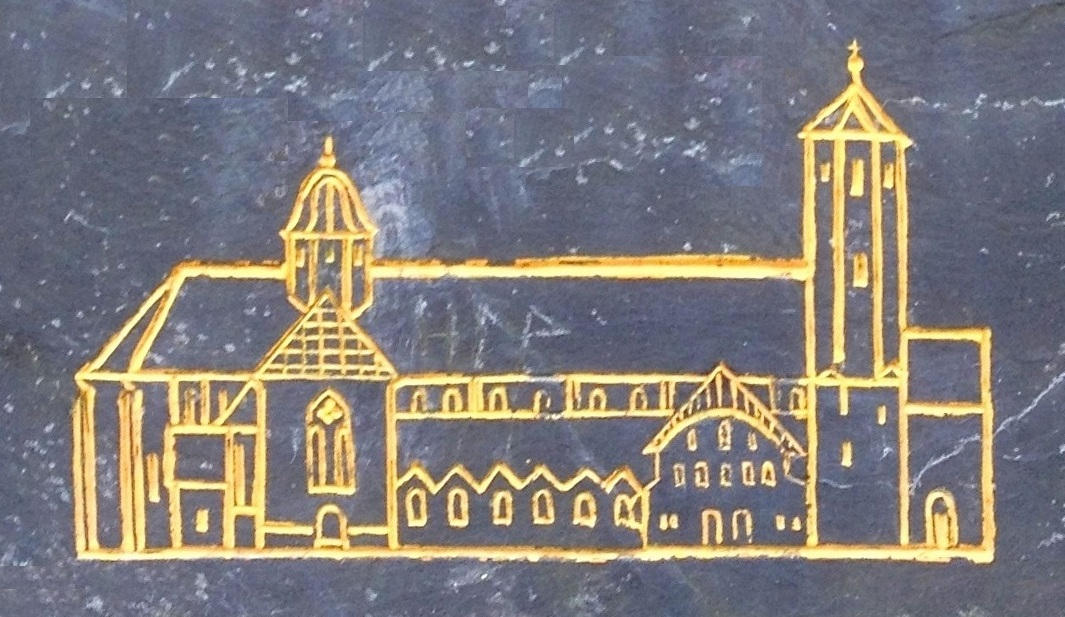
Reconstruction sketch of the Cathedral (Information board at the porch, east side left)

The town of Goslar was first mentioned under the rule of Emperor Otto II in 979; due to the nearby silver mines of Rammelsberg, it quickly evolved into one of the most important medieval cities in the emerging German kingdom. About 1005 King Henry II of Germany had the first Kaiserpfalz built here, which was rebuilt and significantly enlarged by his Salian successors. Erected at the behest of Emperor Henry III, the collegiate church was consecrated on 2 July 1051 by Archbishop Hermann of Cologne. At that time it was the largest Romanesque church east of the Rhine.

The church was dedicated to the apostles Simon and Jude whose feast day of 28 October fell on the birthday of Emperor Henry III, who often stayed in Goslar. About the same time, his consort Agnes of Poitou founded the collegiate church of St. Peter in Goslar which has not survived. In 1056 Pope Victor II and Emperor Henry III met in Goslar and visited the church. When Henry died in the same year, his heart was buried within the walls of Goslar Cathedral.

At Pentecost 1063 the Goslar Precedence Dispute escalated in the church, when on the occasion of a Hoftag diet in the presence of the young king Henry IV an armed conflict arose around the seating order at the vespers between Bishop Hezilo of Hildesheim and the Abbot of Fulda. The bishop had his follower Egbert of Brunswick drive the Fulda worshippers out of the church and the armed conflict that followed resulted in some deaths. According to the medieval chronicler Lambert of Hersfeld, much blood was shed on the altar, while the king's calls for moderation went unheard. The incident became also known as Goslar's Bloody Pentecost.

Under the rule of the Hohenstaufen king Frederick Barbarossa, the Hildesheim cleric Rainald of Dassel assumed the provostship in 1154. The so-called Emperor's Bible was donated to the church by Henry III and remained in its possession until the Thirty Years' War, when it disappeared for nearly 100 years.

After the mediatisation of the former free imperial city of Goslar, by 1819 the collegiate church fell into ruin and, due to a lack of funding for its repair, was sold at auction to a craftsman who used it as "quarry" and had largely demolished it by 1822. Only the cathedral porch was preserved. The church foundations today lie below a large parking lot, the ground plan is marked out within the paving.

In the summer of 2018, a bottled typewritten message dated 26 March 1930 was discovered in the roof of the cathedral, signed by four roofers who bemoaned the economic state of the country. The bottle was discovered by a roofer who was the grandson of one of the signatories, who had been an 18-year-old roofing apprentice in 1930. Goslar's mayor replaced the bottle with a copy of the 1930 message, adding his own confidential message.

== Burials ==
- Matilda of Germany, Duchess of Swabia

== Sources ==
- Griep, Hans-Günther (1988). Goslar - Der Pfalzbezirk, Verlag Goslarsche Zeitung, Goslar
- Gutmann, Christopf and Schadach, Volker (2002). Kaiserpfalz Goslar, Verlag Volker Schadach, Goslar ISBN 3-928728-52-0
- Griep, Hans-Günther (1967). Goslars Pfalzbezirk und die Domkurien. Manuskript für die Mitglieder des Museumsvereins Goslar e.V., Goslar
