= Krodo Altar =

Church altar in Goslar, Germany

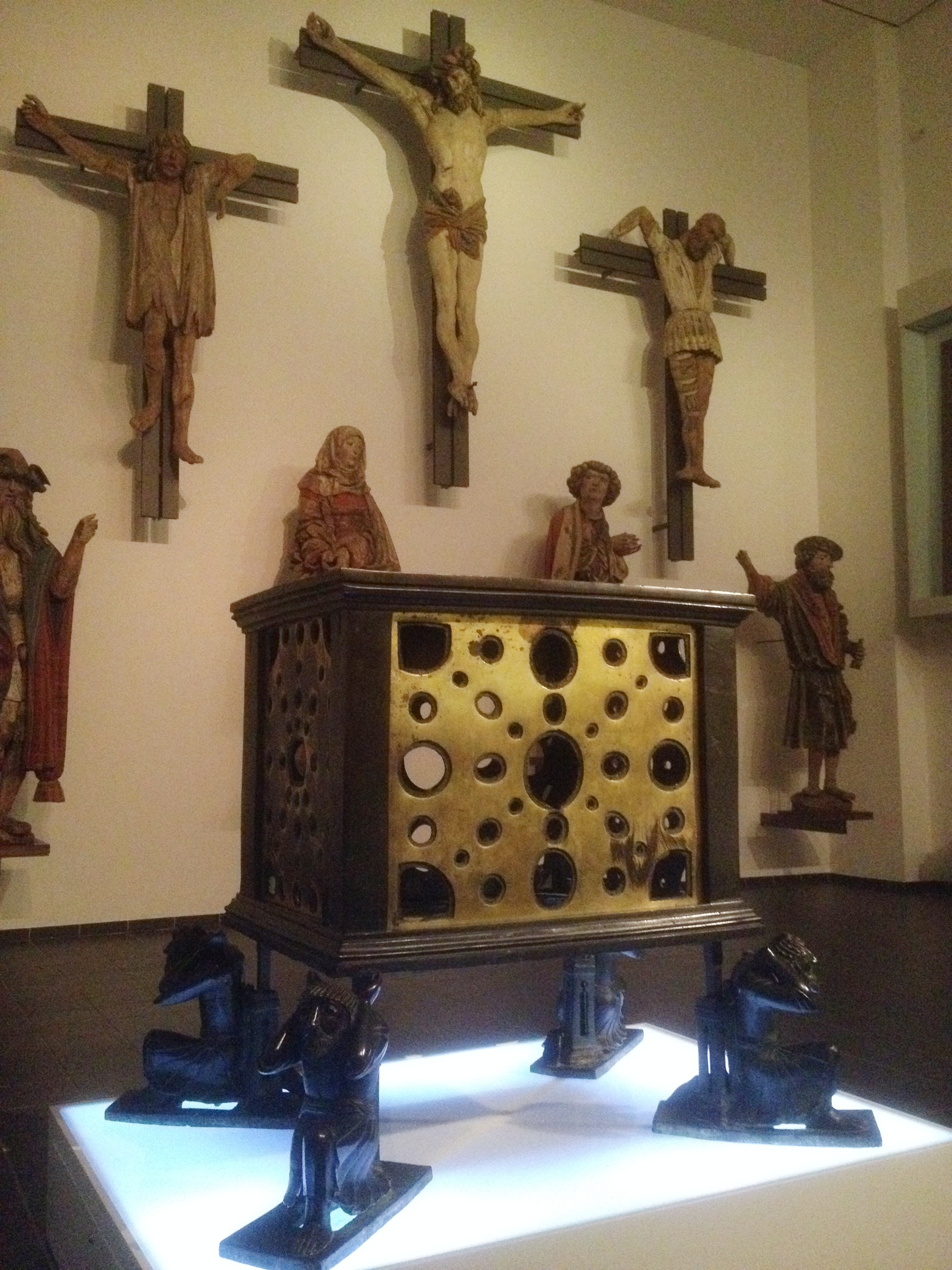
Goslar Museum, Krodo Altar and Crucifixion group from St. Simon and Jude

The Krodo Altar (German: Krodoaltar) in Goslar, Germany, is an altar made entirely of bronze and is the only surviving metal church altar from the Romanesque period. It was probably made in the late 11th century. About 1600 it was popularly named after a deity Krodo which is known only from the description and drawing by Cord Bote in his Sassenchronik ("History of the Saxons", 1492). It was originally in the Collegiate Church of St. Simon and St. Jude (Goslar Cathedral; built 1047), which was part of the Imperial Palace of Goslar. The altar had been removed by the time the church was demolished (1819–1822) and is now on exhibition in Goslar's Town Museum (Stadtmuseum).

== Sources ==
- Reinhard Roseneck: Der Rammelsberg. Verlag Goslarsche Zeitung, Goslar 2001, ISBN 3-9804749-3-3
- Ursula Müller, Hans-Günther Griep, Volker Schadach: Kaiserstadt Goslar. Verlag Volker Schadach, Goslar 2000, ISBN 3-928728-48-2
- Christopf Gutmann, Volker Schadach: Kaiserpfalz Goslar. Verlag Volker Schadach, Goslar 2002, ISBN 3-928728-52-0
