= Hezekiah Davis =

American politician (died 1837)

Member of the Pennsylvania House of Representatives from the Chester County district
- In office 1804–1805 Serving with James Fulton, Edward Darlington, Methuselah Davis, John Boyd
- Preceded by: Joseph Park, James Fulton, Edward Darlington, Thomas Taylor, Methuselah Davis
- Succeeded by: John Boyd, Methuselah Davis, James Kelton, Francis Gardner, John G. Bull

Personal details
- Born: Charlestown Township, Chester County, Pennsylvania, U.S.
- Died: December 27, 1837
- Party: Democratic
- Spouse: Anna Shenck
- Children: 9
- Occupation: Politician; saddler; farmer

Hezekiah Davis (died December 27, 1837) was an American politician who served as a member of the Pennsylvania House of Representatives, representing Chester County from 1804 to 1805.

== Life ==
Davis was born in Charlestown Township, Chester County, Pennsylvania.

He worked as a saddler and owned a farm of 125 acres (51 ha). During the Revolutionary War, he worked as a quartermaster. He was taken as prisoner of war by the British during the Battle of Long Island.

A Democrat, Davis was a local politician in Charlestown Township. He served as a member of the Pennsylvania House of Representatives, representing Chester County from 1804 to 1805.

Davis died on December 27, 1837.

== Personal life ==
Davis married Anna Schenck, descendant of General Schenck, of Brooklyn, New York. They met while was a prisoner of war. They had nine children, Willemina, Harriet, Maria, Julia, Adriana, Nicholas, Nathan, Hannah and Thomas L. His daughter Maria married John G. Wersler, a major who served in the War of 1812. He was a Presbyterian.
