= Goslar precedence dispute =

1063 conflict in Goslar, Germany

The Goslar precedence dispute (German: Goslarer Rangstreit) occurred at Pentecost in 1063 in the collegiate church of Saints Simon and Jude in Goslar, escalating from a dispute over the order of seating into an armed confrontation which resulted in several deaths. The background is the early medieval legal system, based mainly on personal loyalty and privileges that could be conferred or withdrawn at any time.

== Requirements ==
In medieval social order, the symbols and rituals of rank were associated with real power and income. One of these rituals was the order of precedence in the seating at ceremonial occasions. Whoever sat closer to the king or other high-ranking person, had greater rights than other people at the ceremony. As a result, when it was unclear where the delineation was in terms of responsibilities and areas of jurisdiction, so-called "armchair disputes" often arose over the seating order. These rarely resulted in an agreement, because "conceding or giving in would have decided the dispute in favour of one or the other and ... so was out of the question," according to historian Gerd Althoff. None of these disputes ended in such a confrontation, however, as that of the Goslar Precedence Dispute between Abbot Widerad of Fulda and Bishop Hezilo of Hildesheim which resulted in several deaths and a subsequent rebellion by monks.

== The course of the precedence dispute ==
The Abbot of Fulda Abbey, Widerad, and the Bishop of Hildesheim, Hezilo, twice ended up arguing over who had the right to sit next to the Archbishop of Mainz in Goslar's Collegiate Church of St. Simon and Jude.

=== Christmas 1062 ===
During vespers at Christmas in 1062 the dispute broke out for the first time. The actually quite low-ranking abbot claimed this right probably due to the traditional, special relationship between the monastery at Fulda and Archbishop of Mainz: Fulda Abbey had been founded by the Archbishop of Mainz, Boniface. Many imperial and papal privileges had been granted to Fulda Abbey and also to the abbot, who thereby held a special position. For example, the monastery was "exempt", the abbot had a primate and had a right to episcopal pontificalia.

The Bishop of Hildesheim insisted, however, that no one should be preferred over him due to his position as bishop, certainly not within his diocese, where Goslar Cathedral was also exempt and thus did not belong to the Diocese of Hildesheim but directly to the Pope.

The dispute escalated into a scuffle, which the Duke of Bavaria, Otto of Northeim, stopped by vigorously stepping in between them. He decided the seating dispute in favour of the Abbot of Fulda.

King Henry IV spent Christmas in Freising and was not present at this first meeting, which has led Tuomas Heikkilä (see bibliography) to suspect that the meeting was a synod (a meeting of religious leaders only) for the Archdiocese of Mainz, possibly convened in opposition to the transitional government of Anno II.

=== Pentecost 1063 ===
On 7 June 1063, the Saturday before Pentecost, the same issue arose during vespers again. The auspices were different this time: the king was present and it was the occasion of an imperial council (Hoftag). As a result, Hezilo believed that his status as a bishop gave him precedence.

Knowing that Widerad would insist on the status he had been granted at Christmas, Hezilo had prepared for a fight, placing armed men in position behind the altar under the leadership of Egbert of Brunswick. When they heard that the dispute had escalated again in the nave, they drove the Abbot of Fulda from the church, using their clubs. These armed men then took it upon themselves to turn around and go back to church. Lambert of Hersfeld describes the developing carnage, witnessed by the king, in his annals:

In the middle of the chancel and to the chanting of monks, an affray breaks out: except now they fight not just with clubs, but with swords. A heated battle ensues, and battle cries and the wailing of the dying echoes through the church instead of hymns and spiritual songs. On God's altars victims are gruesomely slaughtered; everywhere rivers of blood run through the church, poured out not as formerly required by religious custom, but by hostile cruelty. The Bishop of Hildesheim found an elevated position and urged his men, as if using a military bugle call, to fight bravely, and so that they are not deterred from using weapons by the sanctity of the place, he holds up before them the standard of his authority and his permission. Many on both sides are wounded, many are killed, chief among them Reginbodo, Fulda's standard-bearer, and Bero, one of Count Egbert's most loyal vassals. During the affray the king raises his voice loudly and implores the people to stop, appealing to his royal majesty, but he seems to preach to deaf ears. At the behest of his entourage, to protect his own life and to leave the battlefield, he finally pushes his way with difficulty through the dense crowd of people and retreats to the palace.

— Lambert of Hersfeld, Annals

Hildesheim's men finally managed to eject the Fulda contingent from the church, which resulted in the Fuldans laying siege to the building. Only when darkness fell did the fight come to an end.

== Consequences of the precedence dispute ==
The next day an investigation into the incident took place under the chairmanship of the king. He pronounced Abbot Widerad completely guilty and threatened him with impeachment. The abbot bought himself free from this charge.

According to the account given by Lambert, that decision seems surprising, but Lambert's report was not objective. At the time of the dispute, there was great tension between the monasteries of the Empire and the episcopate. As a member of the monastery at Hersfeld, Lambert was on Widerad's side. His account of Hezilo is therefore probably somewhat exaggerated.

The abbot was accused of having appeared in Goslar with an unduly large and armed group of followers and to have planned the deed long beforehand. Also the Fulda side were accused of have taken up swords and unleashed the carnage during the service. The Hildesheim men had "only" used sticks "before" the beginning of the service. Not insignificant was that Egbert, on the Hildesheim side, had excellent relations with the king: Henry and he shared a common grandmother, the Empress Gisela, and their fathers were half brothers. Moreover Egbert had saved Henry's life in the Coup of Kaiserswerth. As far as the blame laid on the abbot is concerned it is worth mentioning, that he make no use of a papal privilege whereby the Pope had subordinated the abbots of Fulda to himself in 999 so that only the Pope could decide to remove the abbot.

To free himself from the accusation, Widerad made payments to the king and probably also to Hezilo and Goslar Cathedral. To do this he drew on the monastic estate. This propelled the monastery into a deep financial crisis and sparked a rebellion against the Abbot of Fulda by the monks. Although Widerad was able to appease the majority of the monks, sixteen of them made representations to the king, to complain about Widerad's control of the monastery. This time King Henry ruled in favour of Widerad. The uprising was perceived as an attack on the spiritual and secular order, and the rebels were condemned to harsh punishments. They were flogged, shaved and their leaders banished from the monastery; the rest were sent to other monasteries.

== Sources ==
- Lambert of Hersfeld: Annalen. Wissenschaftliche Buchgesellschaft, Darmstadt, 1957. (Selected sources on German history of the Middle Ages. Freiherr vom Stein memorial edition, 13)

== Bibliography ==
- Heikkilä, Tuomas (1998). Das Kloster Fulda und der Goslarer Rangstreit. Helsinki, ISBN 951-41-0856-6.
- Althoff, Gerd (2003). Die Macht der Rituale. Wissenschaftliche Buchgesellschaft, Darmstadt, ISBN 3-534-14749-9.
