= Hezilo of Hildesheim =

Hezilo of Hildesheim, also known as Hezelo, Hettilo or Ethilo (betw. 1020 and 1025–1079), was Bishop of Hildesheim from 1054 to 1079.

== Life ==
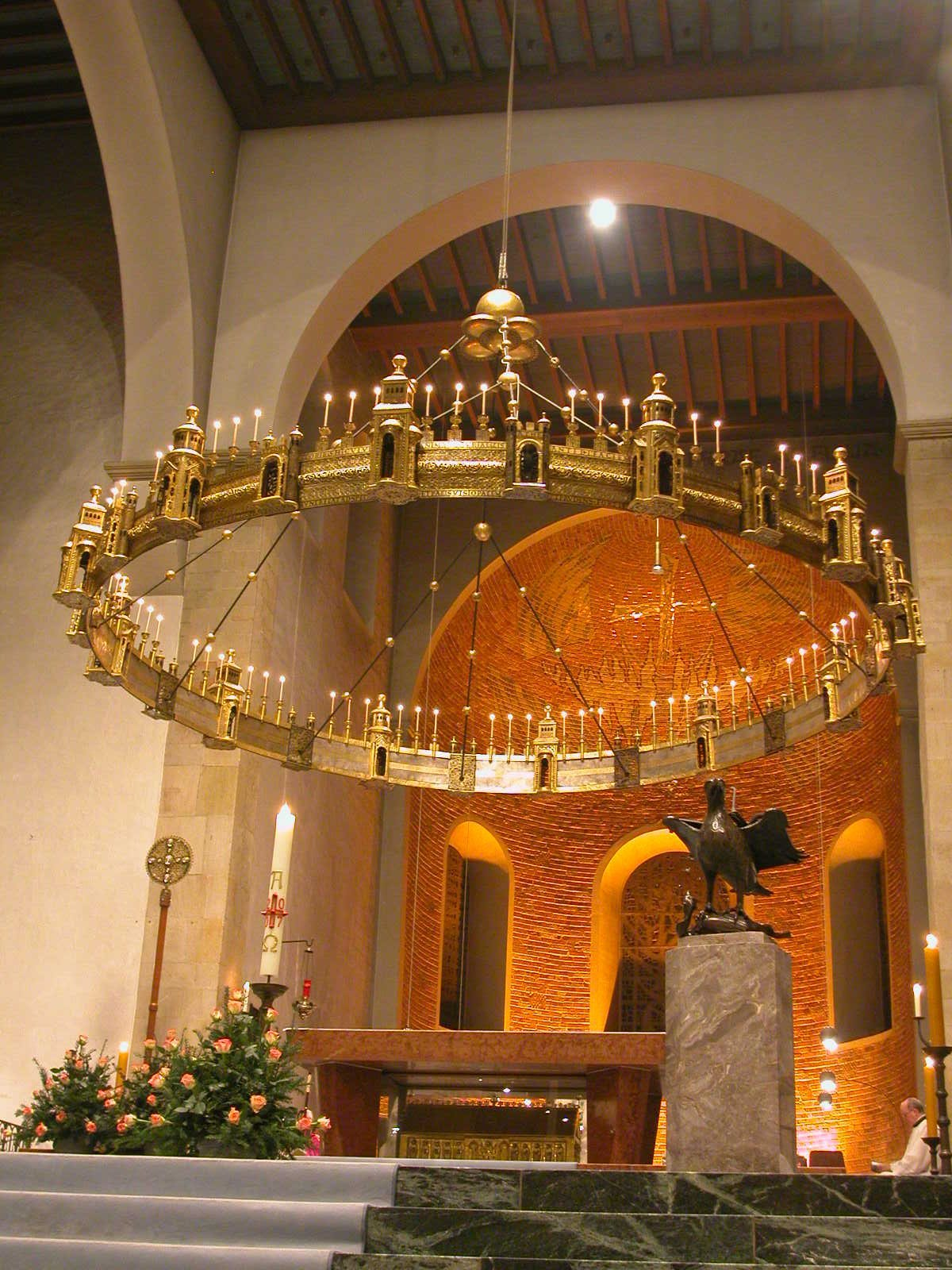
Hezilo chandelier in the Hildesheim Cathedral

Hezilo probably came from a Frankish family and is likely to have received his theology training in Bamberg. Under Emperor Henry III, he was a member of the court chaplaincy (Hofkapelle) in 1051/52, initially as the provost of St. Simon and Jude in Goslar and then in 1053 as Chancellor of Italy. In 1054, he became the successor to Azelin as Bishop of Hildesheim.

Hezilo was concerned to maintain the position of Hildesheim in and around Goslar, the heart of the Salian royal estate, where he and other leading members of the episcopate (including Adalbert of Bremen and Anno of Cologne) could exploit the situation whilst Henry IV was still a minor. In Goslar, he founded the Church of St. James the Elder.

Hezilo's efforts culminated in the Goslar Precedence Dispute with Abbot Widerad of Fulda, which escalated at Pentecost in 1063 in Goslar Cathedral into a bloody massacre in the presence of the young king. According to Lambert of Hersfeld, a supporter of Widerad, Hezilo personally incited the fighters.

During the Saxon Rebellion and Investiture Controversy Hezilo played a part, sometimes vacillating, sometimes mediating. Initially aligning himself probably more closely with the Saxon opponents of the king, he went over in 1075 more to the side of the king's followers, probably due to Henry's military successes, and was a signatory to the anti-Gregorian Declaration of Worms on 24 January 1076.

Whilst Bishop of Hildesheim, Hezilo emerged as one of the great builders and patrons of the arts. Hildesheim Cathedral, which was destroyed by fire in 1046 and which his predecessor, Azelin, had wanted to replace with a large, new building, Hezilo had rebuilt on the foundations of the cathedral built by Altfrid, a former Bishop of Hildesheim. He donated the Hezilo chandelier in the cathedral and the Hezel Cross for the Church of the Cross (Kreuzstift) founded by him.

Emperor Henry IV granted forest rights (Forstbann) at Coppenbrügge to Bishop Hezilo of Hildesheim in 1062.

Hezilo died on 5 August 1079 at Hildesheim and was buried in the Mauritius Church there.

== Sources ==
- Lambert of Hersfeld: Annalen. Lamperti monachi Hersfeldensis Annales. Neu übersetzt von Adolf Schmidt. Erl. von Wolfgang Dietrich Fritz. (= Ausgewählte Quellen zur deutschen Geschichte des Mittelalters. Freiherr vom Stein-Gedächtnisausgabe; 13). Wissenschaftliche Buchgesellschaft, Darmstadt 1957, ISSN 0067-0650

== Bibliography ==
- Bernhard Gallistl: Bedeutung und Gebrauch der großen Lichterkrone im Hildesheimer Dom. In: Concilium medii aevi 12, 2009, ISSN 1437-904X Inhalt, p. 43–88
- Bruno W. Häuptli (2006). "Hezilo (Hizzil Hildensemensis), Bischof von Hildesheim". In Bautz, Traugott (ed.). Biographisch-Bibliographisches Kirchenlexikon (BBKL) (in German). Vol. 26. Nordhausen: Bautz. cols. 712–718. ISBN 3-88309-354-8.
- Tuomas Heikkilä: Das Kloster Fulda und der Goslarer Rangstreit. Academia Scientiarum Fennica, Helsinki 1998, ISBN 951-41-0856-6, (Suomalaisen Tiedeakatemian toimituksia. Sarja Humaniora 298), ISSN 1239-6982.
- Theodor Lindner (1880). "Hezilo". Allgemeine Deutsche Biographie (in German). Vol. 12. Leipzig: Duncker & Humblot. pp. 382–383.
- Ulrich Mattejiet: Hezilo, in: Lexikon des Mittelalters, Vol. 4. München 1989, ISBN 3-7608-8904-2, Sp. 2206

| Preceded by Azelin | Bishop of Hildesheim; 1054–1079 | Succeeded by Udo of Gleichen-Reinhausen |
