= Estates General of 1632 =

Estates General États Généraux (French) / Staten Generaal (Dutch)
- Estates of the realm First Estate of prelates Second Estate of nobility Third Estate of chief cities

History
- Established: 7 September 1632
- Disbanded: 5 July 1634
- Preceded by: Estates General of 1600

The Estates General of 1632 was a parliamentary assembly of representatives of the constituent provinces of the Habsburg Netherlands. It was the last such assembly.

== Crisis ==
It had been over thirty years since a gathering of the Estates General had been convened by the Habsburg rulers in the Low Countries. In a situation of deep political crisis, the Governor-General, Infanta Isabella Clara Eugenia, called the Estates General to rally the political elites to the Habsburg cause. The letters convoking the assembly were sent on 30 July, with the date for the opening set as 7 September. The assembly was dissolved on 5 July 1634.

== Delegates ==
The delegates attending were as follows.

Delegation	Prelates	Nobles	Third Estate (Representatives of the cities)
Duchy of Brabant	*Jacobus Boonen, Archbishop of Mechelen; *Jan Drusius, Abbot of Park Abbey	*Philippe-Charles, 3rd Count of Arenberg, Duke of Aarschot; *Conrad d'Ursel, 1st Baron of Hoboken	*Daniel Van Asche, mayor of Leuven; *Jan Silvius, pensionary of Leuven; *Charles de Locquenghien, knight, mayor of Brussels; *Charles Schotte, knight, pensionary of Brussels; *Anthoine Silvery, knight, outer mayor of Antwerp; *Jacques Edelheer, pensionary of Antwerp
Duchy of Limburg	*Michiel Vermers, abbot of Val-Dieu	*Guillaume Scheiffaut, lord of Clairmont	*Jan Guillaume de Gulpen; *Amand d'Eynatten; *Emond-Plennus Aphernom; *Guillaume de Goldenborch, the king's lieutenant of the duchy
Duchy of Luxembourg	*Pierre Fisch, abbot of Echternach; *Laurent de la Roche, abbot of Orval	*Gerard, baron Schwartzenberg & Hohenlansberg, knight, justiciar of Luxembourg	*Gerard Horst, baron of Houffalize, provost of Echternach and Bitburg; *Jan Stompheus, alderman of Thionville; *Jan de Baude, mayor of La Roche
County of Flanders	*George Chamberlain, bishop of Ypres; *Bernard Campmans, abbot of Dunes; *Franchois Ghistelles, canon of Ghent		*Guillaume de Blazere, lord of Hellenbus, first alderman of Ghent; *Jan-Baptiste Schorman, pensionary of Ghent; *Alexander Muelenair, mayor of Bruges; *Guillaume Michiels, pensionary of Bruges; *Pierre d'Hanneron, lord of Voocht, mayor of Ypres; *Jan Stichelenen, pensionary of Ypres; *Paul du Chastel, mayor and alderman of the Brugse Vrije; *Viglius Van Marcke, pensionary of the Brugse Vrije
County of Artois	*Paul Boudot, bishop of Arras; *Philippe de Caverel, abbot of St Vaast	*Guillaume de Montmorency, knight, lord of Noefville-Vitast, viscount Roulets; *Gilles de Lières, viscount of Lières, baron du Val, governor of Lens	*Jacques du Val, lord of Natoy, mayor of Arras; *Franchois de Moncheaux, lord of Foncquevillers, pensionary of Arras
County of Hainaut	*Pierre Lejeune, abbot of Hautmont; *Jaspar Vincq, abbot of Saint-Denis-en-Broqueroie	*Gabriel du Chasteler, knight, lord of Moulbaix, Ansermont, etc. *Anthoine d'Yve, knight, lord of Poix, Rametz, etc.	*Philippe de Seture, licentiate of laws, first alderman of the city of Mons; *Philippe Bosquier, captain of a company of citizens, second alderman of Mons; *Jaspar Chosquier, captain of a company of citizens *Gilles d'Ervillers, lord of Loensart, city councillor of Mons; *Guy Vimeu, pensionary of Mons; *Jerome Le Bar, pensionary of the States of Hainaut
City of Valenciennes			*Jacques de Poivre, lord of Brislocq, Fonsière, etc., current provost of Valenciennes; *Jan Desmaisières, lord of Vassal, le Saulch, etc., former provost of Valenciennes; *Michiel de Maulde, first councillor of the city of Valenciennes
County of Namur	*Engelbert Des Bois, bishop of Namur; *Joan Robert, abbot of Floreffe	*Florent de Noyelle, baron Torsy, lord of Tongrenelle; *Paul de Berloos, lord of Bruuz, Petit-Leez, Francodouaire	*Jacques Lambert, licentiate of laws, pensionary *Jean Son, licentiate of laws, pensionary *Albert de Tamison, lord of Maiserel; *Jan les Ferais, alderman of the city of Namur
Lille, Douai and Orchies	*Jean du Joncquoy, abbot of Marchiennes	*Henry de Haynin, knight, lord of Seclin, bailly general of the castellany of Lille	*Jan de Wasquehal, knight, lord of Lassus, mayor of Lille; *Pierre de Broide, doctor of laws, pensionary of Douai; *Adam Rogier, alderman of Orchies; *Philippe de le Val, knight, lord of Grincourt
City of Tournai			*Louis d'Hovyne, lord of Bossut sur l'Escaut, provost of the city of Tournai; *Jean-Baptiste Moenens, licentiate of laws, pensionary of Tournai
Tournaisis	*Nicolas du Bois, abbot of St Amand	*Guillaume Bernard, knight, lord of Lhonnoy, bailiff of Rumes	*Jacques Leclercq, licentiate of laws, councillor and pensionary of the States of the Tournaisis
City and lordship of Mechelen			*Philippes Snoy; *Jan de Wachtendonck, lord of Rumpsdorp-Guerlbund, first alderman *Gosmar de Prant, lord of Blaesvelt etc. *Arnould de Fumal, pensionary
