= Jean Richardot =

Flemish statesman and diplomat

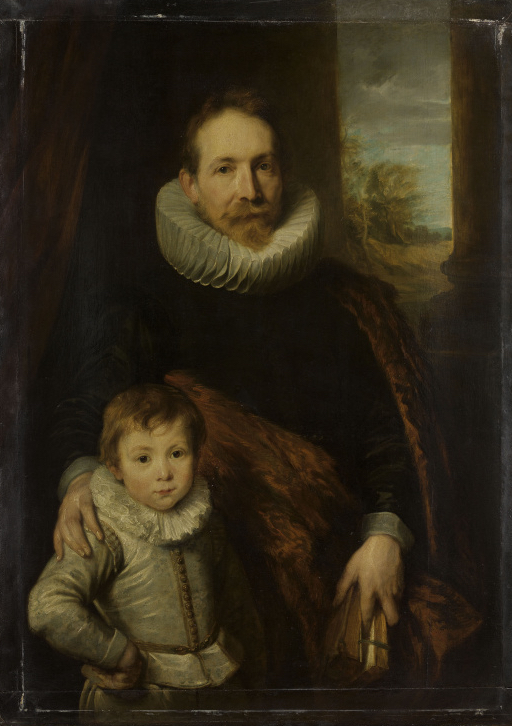
- Richardot and his son (by Anthony van Dyck)

President of the Privy Council of the Habsburg Netherlands
- In office 1597–1609
- Monarchs: Archdukes Albert and Isabella
- Succeeded by: Engelbert Maes

Personal details
- Born: Jean Grusset; 1540 Champlitte, Franche-Comté
- Died: 3 September 1609 (aged 68–69) Arras
- Resting place: Church of St Gudula, Brussels
- Spouse: Anne Courcol de Baillencourt
- Relations: François Richardot (maternal uncle)
- Parent(s): Guillaume Grusset and Marguerite Richardot
- Education: civil law
- Alma mater: Leuven University

Jean Grusset dict Richardot, knight (1540 – 3 September 1609) was a statesman and diplomat from the Franche-Comté, who held high political office during the Dutch Revolt and played an important role in restoring Habsburg rule in the Southern Netherlands.

== Early life and career ==
Jean Richardot belonged to the network of families from the Franche-Comté that rose to important posts in the administration of the Habsburg Netherlands under the patronage of Antoine Perrenot de Granvelle. He was born in Champlitte in 1540 as the son of Guillaume Grusset and Marguerite Richardot. His uncle on his mother's side was François Richardot, the confessor of Margaret of Parma, a close collaborator of Granvelle and his successor as bishop of Arras. François Richardot supervised his nephew's education and furthered his first steps in the Habsburg administration. Whether out of gratitude or calculation, Jean Grusset subsequently adopted his uncle's surname. After his humanities at the Collège Granvelle in Besançon, Jean studied law at the universities of Leuven, where he established strong ties with one of his professors, Peter Peckius. He continued his studies in Rome and Padua and obtained his doctorate in law from the University of Bologna.

Thanks to the patronage of Granvelle, Philip II appointed Richardot councillor in the Great Council of Mechelen in 1568. Seven years later he was promoted to the Privy Council of the Habsburg Netherlands, one of the three Collateral Councils that advised the Governor-General of the Habsburg Netherlands, a post that was at the time held by Don Luis de Requesens y Zúñiga. In the confusion that followed the death of Requesens, Richardot sided with the Dutch Revolt and its leader William the Silent. The move earned him an appointment to the Privy Council of the rebels' Governor-General Archduke Matthias. In that capacity he was sent to Arras to use his local connections to dissuade the States of Artois from joining the Union of Arras.

== Rise to power under Farnese ==
Richardot would soon follow the example of the States of Artois, Hainaut and Lille, Douai and Orchies and reconcile with the new Governor-General, Alexander Farnese. He even penned a satirical attack on William the Silent, published anonymously as Le Renart decouvert (Mons: Rutger Velpius, 1580). Farnese was quick to recognize Richardot's talents, confirmed his membership of the Privy Council in 1580 and saw to his appointment as president of the Council of Artois in 1581. One of his first achievements was persuading the States of Artois to accept the return of Spanish units from the Army of Flanders. Soon thereafter Richardot was knighted by Philip II. On 26 February 1583, he was appointed councillor of the Council of State, the highest of the Collateral Councils and as such in charge of advising on matters of state. Farnese employed Richardot in many of the negotiations that secured the reconciliation of towns in Flanders and Brabant. Among these were Ypres, Bruges, Ghent, Brussels and Antwerp. He was also put in charge of the delegation that met with the envoys of Queen Elizabeth I at Bourbourg in 1587, in a feigned attempt to end hostilities between England and Spain. Meanwhile, Farnese sent Richardot twice to the court of Madrid. His mission in 1583-1584 was to obtain more men and money for the war in the Netherlands. In 1589 he was sent to explain Farnese's failure to invade England with the Spanish Armada.

The disgrace and death of Farnese in December 1592 put Richardot's career on hold. The acting Governor-General Count Peter Ernst von Mansfeld even sought means to remove him from the Council of State. Initially, the Count of Fuentes was no less hostile, though he came to value Richardot's abilities towards the end of his tenure as acting Governor-General.

== President of the Privy Council under the Archdukes ==
Richardot saw his political fortunes restored after Cardinal-Archduke Albert was installed as the new Governor-General in February 1596. On 15 May 1597 Albert's recommendation ensured his appointment to the post of Chief-President of the Privy Council. From then on Richardot would be the highest ranking and most influential subject of the Habsburg Netherlands serving the Governor-General and subsequently the sovereign Archdukes Albert and Isabella. As a well known supporter of a general pacification in the Netherlands, he was often depicted by those in favor of continuing the war against the United Provinces and their English and French allies as lacking in loyalty to the Spanish crown. In spite of that opposition, Richardot's policies would gradually prevail.

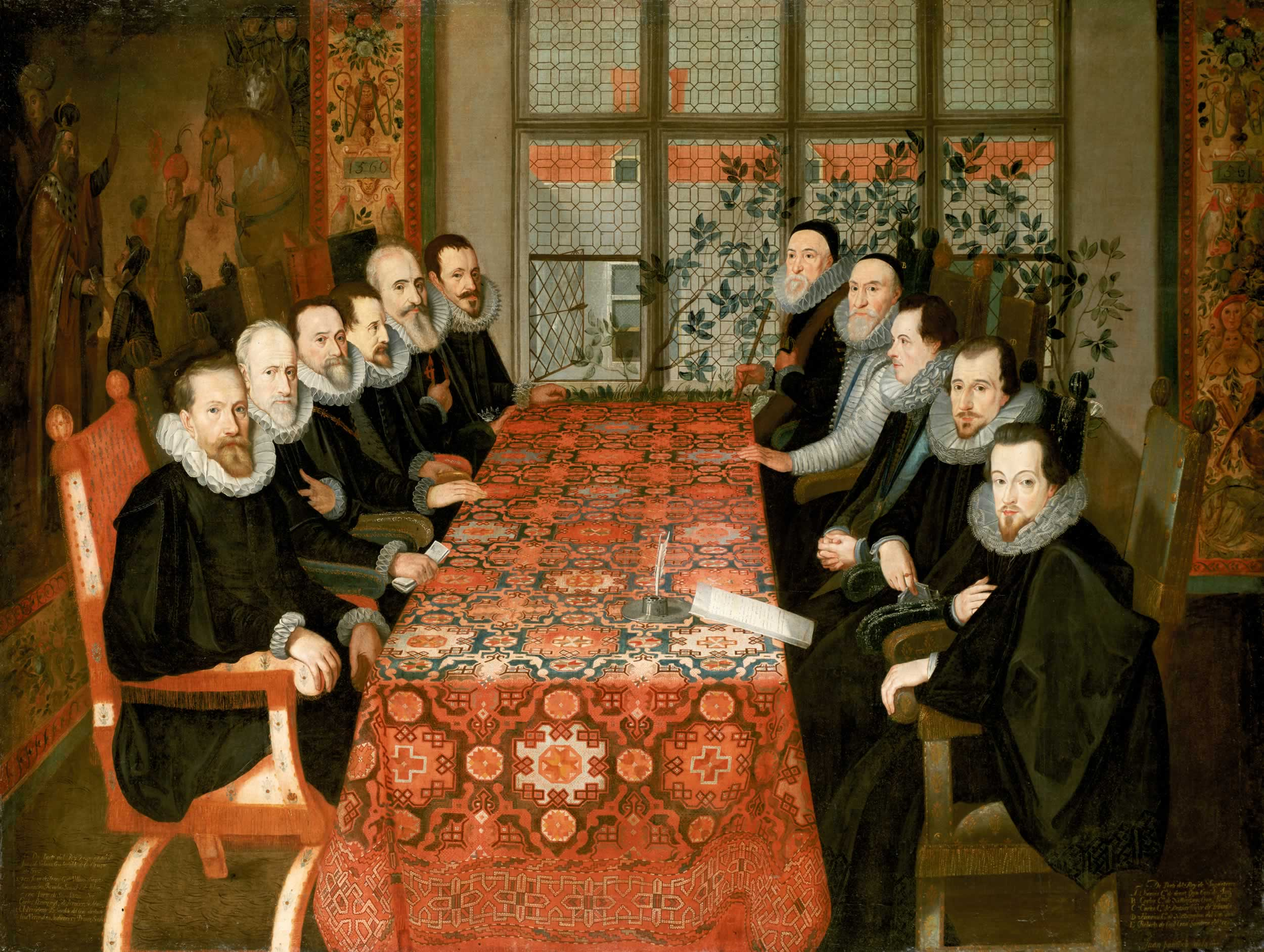
The Somerset House Conference of 1604, ascribed to Juan Pantoja de la Cruz. Jean Richardot is seated second on the left.

At every stage Richardot was at the center of the negotiations, as a rule seconded by the archducal Audiencier Lodewijk Verreycken. Between February and May 1598, the two of them teamed up with Juan de Tassis in the talks leading to the Peace of Vervins between Philip II and Henry IV of France. Two years later, Richardot had to admit defeat when talks held at Boulogne broke up over issues of precedence, thereby wasting the chance to bring an end to the war between Elizabeth I and Philip III. When the succession of James I of England opened a new window of opportunity, Richardot, Verreycken and Charles princely count of Arenberg participated between May and August 1604 in the conference at Somerset House that elaborated the Treaty of London. In an effort to conclude a peace treaty with the Dutch Republic, Ambrogio Spinola and Richardot acted as the chief negotiators in the Habsburg delegation at the conference of The Hague from February to August 1608. Hopes to reach a definitive peace foundered however on irreconcilable issues of religion and trade. Under the mediation of France and England, the parties then settled for the Twelve Years' Truce that was signed in Antwerp in April 1609.

== Death and descendants ==
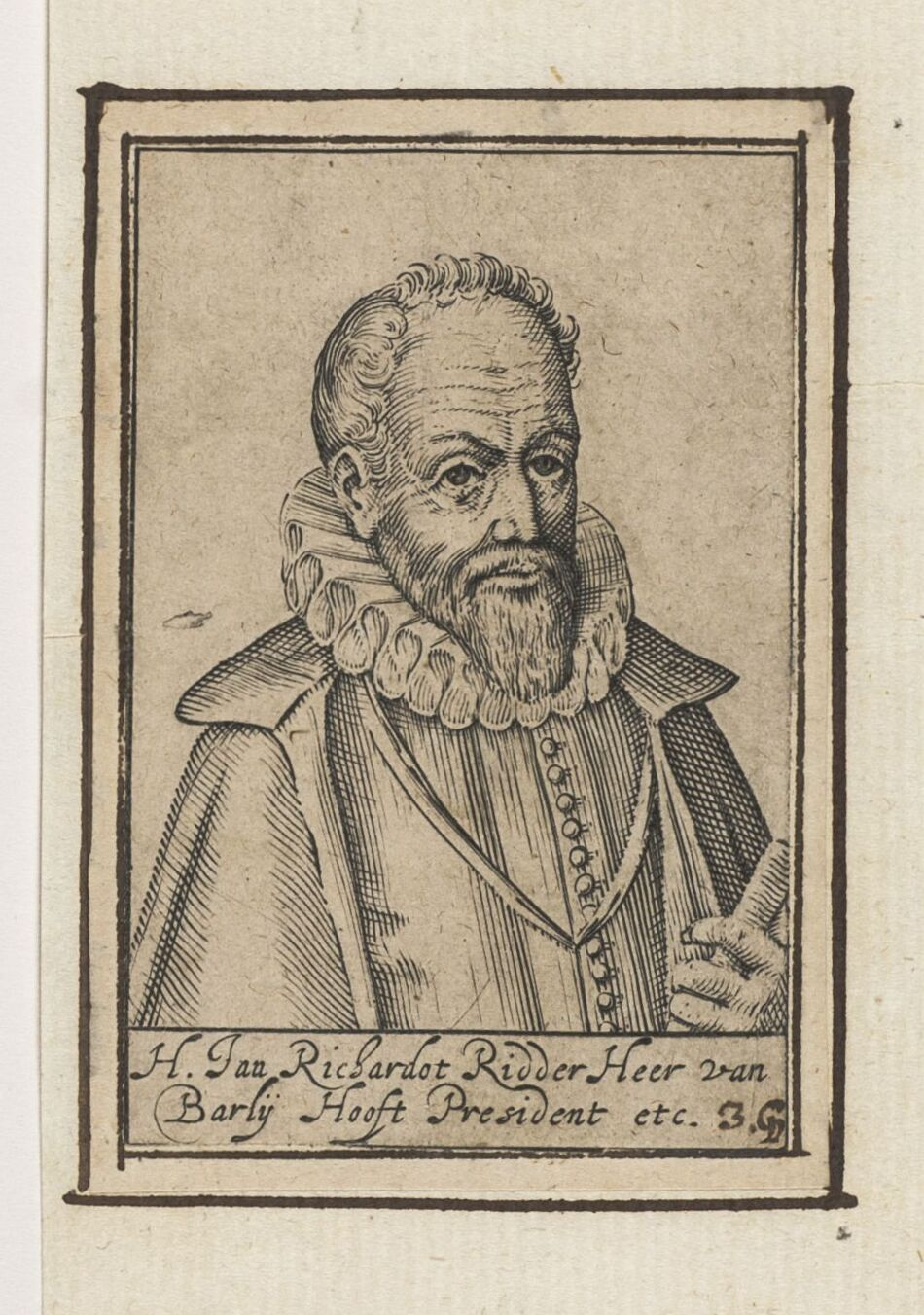
Jean Richardot

Almost immediately after concluding the Truce, the archducal regime was confronted with the succession dispute over the Duchies of Jülich, Cleves and Berg. Soon Henry IV of France and Archduke Albert were sharply divided over how to deal with the crisis. To make matters worse, the Prince of Condé chose that moment to flee to Brussels with his wife, Charlotte Marguerite de Montmorency, thereby hoping to put her out of reach of the French king's amorous attentions. Hoping to avert a war, Richardot travelled to the French Court in August 1609 with instructions to assure Henry IV of Albert's neutrality in both affairs. In a show of displeasure, Henry conducted the audience outdoors, compelling the almost septuagenarian minister to stand bareheaded in the Sun for over an hour. Apparently suffering from the effects of hyperthermia, Richardot died on the way home at the residence of his son and namesake, the Bishop of Arras, on 3 September. He was buried in the Chapel of the Blessed Sacrament of the Miracle of the Collegiate Church of St. Michael and St. Gudula (now Brussels' cathedral).

In 1568 Jean Richardot married Anne Courcol de Baillencourt, who descended of a noble family from Artois. The couple had twelve children. Among them were:

- Françoise, married Conrad III Schetz dict van Ursel, created 1st baron of Hoboken in 1600, first archducal ambassador in England (1604-1609), ancestor of the Dukes d'Ursel.
- Jean Richardot the Younger, bishop of Arras (1603-1609) and prince-archbishop of Cambrai (1609-1614).
- François, lieutenant of a company of cavalry, died in the Battle of Nieuwpoort.
- Pierre, abbot of Echternach (1607-1628).
- Guillaume Richardot, who was educated in the house of Justus Lipsius, styled baron of Lembeek, created count of Galmaarden (in French: Gammeranges) in 1623.
- Antoine Richardot, who was also educated in the house of Justus Lipsius, captain of a company of cavalry, died of his wounds after an encounter at Rheinberg.

== Sources ==
- Brants, Victor (1901). "Un ministre belge au XVIIe siècle: Jean Richardot, chef-président du Conseil privé des Pays-Bas, 1597-1609". Académie royale de Belgique: Bulletin de la Classe des lettres. 8. Académie royale de Belgique: 831–914.
- Eysinga, Willem Jan Marie (1959). De wording van het Twaafjarig Bestand van 9 april 1609. Noord-Hollandsche Uitgevers Maatschappij.
- Dickerman, Edmund H. (1974). "Henry IV and the Juliers-Cleves Crisis: The Psychohistorical Aspects". French Historical Studies. 8 (4). Duke University Press: 626–653. doi:10.2307/285856. ISSN 0016-1071. JSTOR 285856.
- Allen, Paul C. (2000). Philip III and the Pax Hispanica, 1598-1621: The Failure of Grand Strategy. Yale University Press. ISBN 0-300-07682-7.
- Vanhoutte, Jürgen (2004). "Van robins tot très grands nobles: Carrièreplanning en huwelijksstrategie bij het geslacht Richardot in de Zuidelijke Nederlanden (1540-1701)". In Marnef, Guido; Vermeir, René (eds.). Adel en macht: politiek, cultuur, economie. Shaker publishing. pp. 17–55. ISBN 90-423-0252-6.
