= Johannes Bertelius =

Luxembourgish historian and abbot

Dom Johannes Bertelius O.S.B.
- Abbot of St Willibrord's Abbey, Echternach
- Church: Roman Catholic
- Installed: 1595
- Term ended: 1607
- Predecessor: Jean Glatz
- Successor: Pierre Richardot

Personal details
- Born: Jean Bertels; 1544 Leuven, Duchy of Brabant
- Died: 19 June 1607 (aged 62–63)
- Education: Leuven University

Johannes Bertelius [also Jean Bertels] (1544 – June 19, 1607), abbot of Echternach and writer of a history of Luxembourg, was born in Leuven.

After obtaining a degree in philosophy at the Pedagogy of the Lily in Leuven University, Bertelius was elected abbot of Altmünster Abbey, Luxembourg, in 1573 and was consecrated in 1576. On his orders the relics of John the Blind, Duke of Luxembourg and King of Bohemia, were buried there. In 1595 king Philip II of Spain appointed him abbot of the Benedictine monastery of St. Willibrord at Echternach.

The following year the abbey was pillaged by Dutch freebooters and Bertelius was taken prisoner and removed to Nijmegen. He was released only after a ransom payment. After his return, he devoted himself to literary work until his death. He was buried in a chapel of the monastery at Echternach.

== Works ==
In 1581, Bertelius published a catalogue of the abbots of the Altmünster abbey and his Dialogi XXVI in regulam S. Benedicti. In 1595, the Catalogus et series episcoporum Epternacensium was printed. The year 1606 saw the publication of a treatise on the pagan gods worshipped by the ancient Germanic tribes (Deorum sacrifiorumque gentilium descriptio). The main work by Bertelius, however, is the Historia Luxemburgensis, printed in Cologne in 1605. This was the first history of Luxembourg.

Apart from the Latin works by Bertelius, there exists a collection of drawings made by him which has been edited by Paul Spang.
