= Paul Boudot =

Paul Boudot (1571–1635) was bishop of Saint-Omer and bishop of Arras in the Low Countries (both now in France).

== Life ==
Boudot was born in Morteau, in Franche Comté, in 1571. He graduated doctor of the Sorbonne in 1604, and was appointed the episcopal official of Jean Richardot, bishop of Arras, following him to Cambrai as archdeacon when Richardot became archbishop there. He was also appointed a preacher in ordinary to Albert VII, Archduke of Austria, preaching the funeral sermon for Albert's brother Emperor Rudolph II in the court chapel in Brussels in 1612. In 1619 he was appointed bishop of Saint-Omer in place of Jacques Blaseus, O.F.M. Rec., who died the previous year. In 1626, Boudot was transferred to Arras. On 17 March of that year he gave his approval to and graced with indulgences an anonymous Marian devotional text, The Devotion of Bondage. As bishop he sat as a representative of the First Estate for the County of Artois in the Estates General of 1632. He died in Arras on 11 November 1635.

== Publications ==
- Summa theologica divi Thomae Aquinatis, recensita (Arras)
- Traitté du Sacrement de Pénitence, tant en général qu'en particulier (Paris: Michel Sonnius, 1601) Available on Google Books
- Harangue funèbre faicte et prononcée avec funérailles solennelles de l'empereur Rodolphe II, prononcée à Bruxelles (Arras: Robert Maudhuy, 1612) Available on Google Books
- Pythagorica Marci Antonii de Dominis nova Metempsychosis (Antwerp: Gerard Wolsschaten, 1617) Available on Google Books
- Formula visitationis per totam suam dioecesim faciendae (Douai, 1627)
- Catechismus sive Summa doctrinae christianae pro dioecesi Atrebatensi (Douai, 1628)
- Confrairie erigée en l'église et abbaye de Vicoigne de l'ordre de Premonstré (Valenciennes: Jan Vervliet, 1635) Available on Google Books
