= Pierre Fisch =

Dom Pierre Fisch O.S.B.
- Abbot of St Willibrord's Abbey, Echternach
- Church: Roman Catholic
- Installed: 1628
- Term ended: 1657
- Predecessor: Pierre Richardot
- Successor: Richard Paschasius

Personal details
- Born: Rosport, Duchy of Luxembourg
- Died: 15 March 1657
- Education: University of Trier

Pierre Fisch (died 15 March 1657) was the 64th abbot of St Willibrord's Abbey, Echternach. He was born in Rosport and studied at the University of Trier. He became abbot in 1628 and worked to improve the standards of theological education at the monastery, inviting lecturers and restocking the library. He also built a new chapel dedicated to St Sebastian in the monastery church.

In the Estates General of 1632 he was the first representative of the ecclesiastical estate for the Duchy of Luxembourg.

He died on 15 March 1657 and was buried in the abbey church. In 1829 his tomb was opened and his remains were transferred to the Lady Chapel.
