= Pierre Richardot =

16th and 17th-century Catholic abbot

Dom Pierre-Robert O.S.B.
- Abbot of St Willibrord's Abbey, Echternach
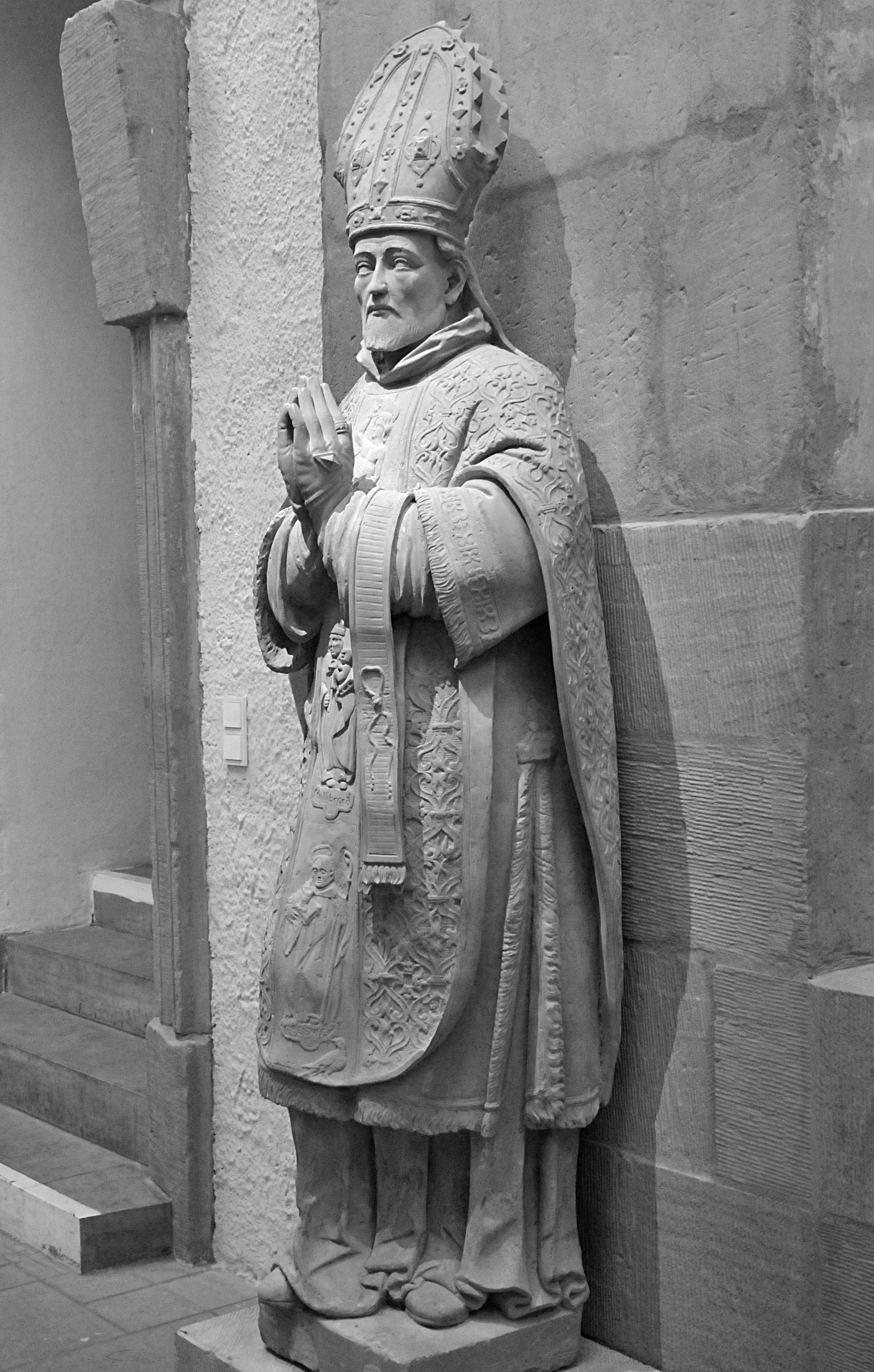
- Statue in the Echternach abbey
- Church: Catholic
- Installed: 1607
- Term ended: 1628
- Predecessor: Johannes Bertelius
- Successor: Pierre Fisch

Personal details
- Born: Pierre Richardot c.1575 Arras
- Died: 24 February 1628
- Education: Leuven University

Pierre Richardot (c.1575–1628) was the 61st abbot of St Willibrord's Abbey, Echternach. He was the son of Jean Richardot, president of the Brussels Privy Council, and Anne Courcol de Baillencourt. Born in Arras, he studied Theology at the University of Leuven and entered the Abbey of St. Vaast in his native city.

In 1607 Richardot was named abbot of Echternach. His abbacy was overshadowed by the need to economise to pay off the debts run up to ransom his predecessor, Johannes Bertelius, who had been kidnapped by Dutch freebooters. He died on 24 February 1628 and was buried near the high altar in the abbey church.

During Richardot's tenure as abbot he made a manuscript written by his medieval predecessor Thiofrid of Echternach available for publication, as Flores epitaphii sanctorum (Luxembourg, 1619).
