= Jan Drusius =

Jan Drusius can refer to:

- Johannes van den Driesche (1550–1616), Flemish Protestant divine
- Jan Druys (died 1635), Flemish Norbertine canon regular and abbot of Park Abbey
