= Vedulphus =

French saint and bishop

Vedulphus was a Pre-congregational saint and Bishop of Arras, France from 545AD.

He succeeded Bishop Domenico in 545AD, and when he died in 580AD the diocese of Arras was suppressed to establish Diocese of Cambrai.
His feast day is 6 February.

Religious titles
Preceded by Dominicus of Arras	Bishop of Arras; 545-580	Succeeded by Lambert
