= Alvise (bishop of Arras) =

12th-century Flemish bishop

- Bishop of Arras
- Diocese: Arras
- Elected: 1131
- Term ended: May 16, 1115
- Predecessor: Robert I
- Successor: Godescalc
- Other post: Abbot of Anchin Abbey (?-1131)

Personal details
- Died: September 6, 1148 Philippopolis, Byzantine Empire

Bishop Alvise (died September 6, 1148) was a Bishop of Arras in the 12th century.

== Biography ==
The son of Einard and Hostina, he was a native of Flanders but his year of birth is controversial, with sources claiming 1060, 1070 or 1075.

According to medieval chroniclers, he had been a novice and Canon of the Abbey of Saint Bertin at Saint-Omer. He was then prior of the Abbey of Saint-Vaast and then abbot of Anchin Abbey. He was an energetic supporter of the Cluniac reforms and helped to spread them to Marchiennes Abbey, Ghent and Lobbes among other places. He participated in the Second Crusade with Louis VII of France and according to some sources, he fell ill at Philippopolis, Thrace and died September 6, 1148.
