= Dominicus of Arras =

Pre-congregational saint and Bishop of Arras, France

Domenico of Arras was a Pre-congregational saint and Bishop of Arras, France from 540AD to about 545AD. His feast day is 6th Feb.

Religious titles
Preceded by Vedastus	Bishop of Arras; 540-545-	Succeeded by Vedulphus
