= Michael Mongkhol On Prakhongchit =

Thai Roman Catholic prelate (1905–1958)

His Excellency Michael Mongkhol On Prakhongchit
- Vicar Apostolic of Thare
- Metropolis: Thare and Nonseng
- Installed: 7 May 1953
- Term ended: 23 January 1958
- Predecessor: Claudius-Philippe Bayet
- Successor: Michael Kien Samophithak

Orders
- Ordination: 23 December 1933
- Consecration: 19 August 1953 by John Jarlath Dooley

Personal details
- Born: 5 August 1905 Bangkok
- Died: 23 January 1958 (aged 52)

Michael Mongkhol On Prakhongchit (5 August 1905 – 23 January 1958) was a Thai Roman Catholic prelate. He was titular bishop of Blaundus from 1953 until his death and first Thai native Vicar Apostolic of Thare from 1953 until his death.

Catholic Church titles
| Preceded by Claudius-Philippe Bayet | Vicar Apostolic of Thare; 1953–1958 | Succeeded by Michael Kien Samophithak |
