= Jacques de Dinant =

French Catholic bishop

Jacques de Dinant was a medieval Bishop of Arras, France.

He was appointed bishop by Pope Innocent IV on 4 October 1247, and he resigned as bishop in 1259.
He was also a considerable scholar of the 13th century. He was educated in Northern France or Holland and in the latter part of his life taught at the University of Bologna in the department of Rhetoric.

His works include:

- Summa Dictaminis
- Breviloquium
- Ars Arengandi
- Sex formulae dictaminis
- Exordia in linea clericali and
- Exordia in linea seculari.

Religious titles
Preceded by Fursy	Bishop of Arras; 1248-1259	Succeeded by Pierre de Noyon
