= Diocese of Blaundus =

Roman Catholic titular see

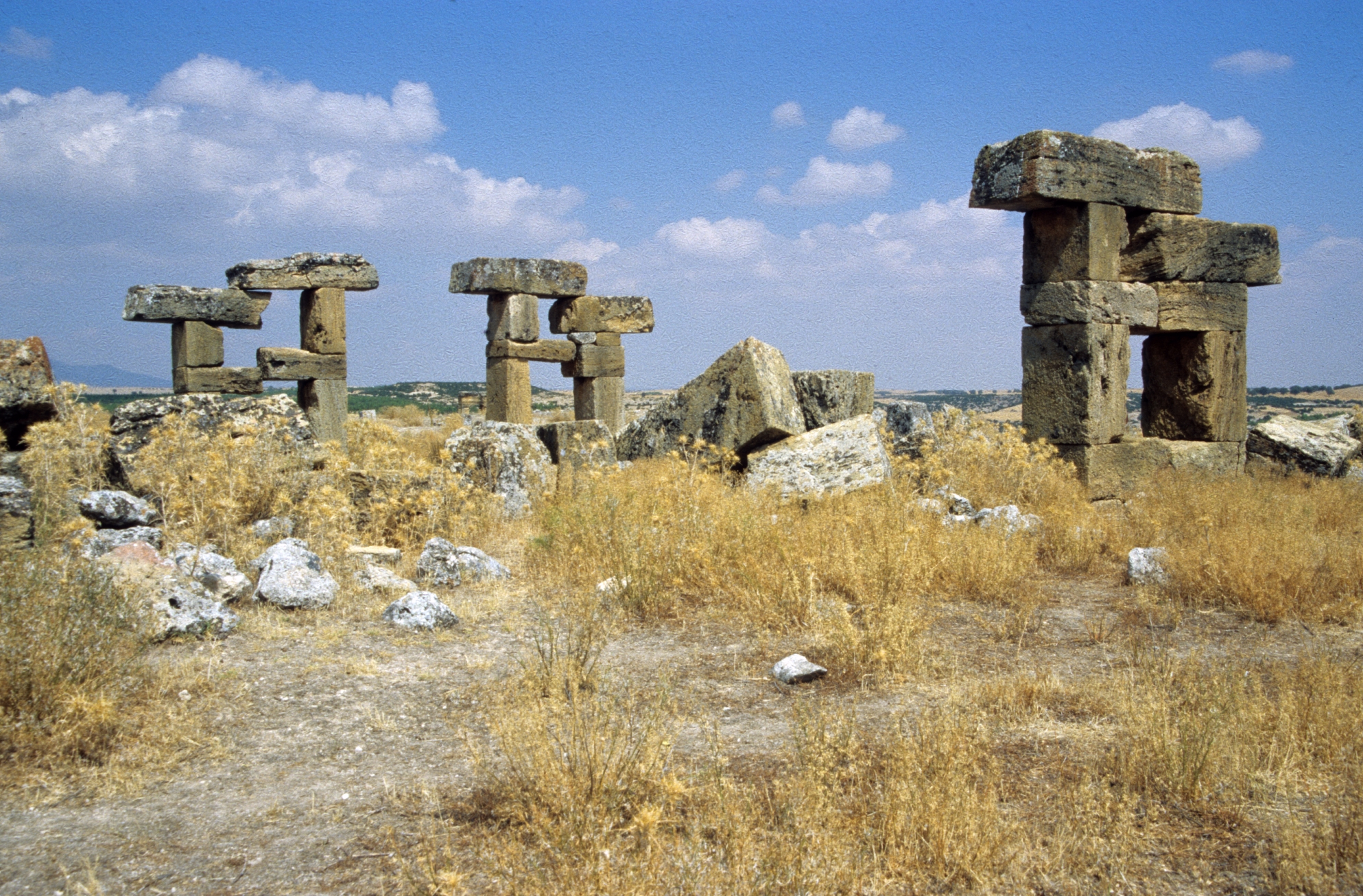
Ruins in Blaundus, Turkiye, Usak Province

The city of Blaundus was the seat of a bishopric in the Roman and Byzantine era. It was a suffragan of the Metropolitan Archdiocese of Sardes, also in Lydia. It was part of the Patriarchate of Constantinople and was suffragan of Archdiocese of Sardis.

The diocese is known by the names Blaundus, Blandus and Balandus, in the 5th century AD, the bishopric was connected to the diocese center at Sebaste. The last record of Blaundus dates from the 12th century

There are three bishops assured of here. At the synod Arian of Seleucia in 359, Phoebus distanced himself from his fellow Aryans taken, signed the orthodox formula drafted by Acacius of Caesarea, and for this reason he was deposed. Elijah took part in the Council of Chalcedon of 451, while Onesiphore signed a letter written by the bishops of Lydia to ' Emperor Leo in 458 following the killing of Proterius of Alexandria. In the Council of Constantinople (879-880) that rehabilitated Photius we find a Eustathius of Alandos, but there is no evidence that this is Balandus.

Today Blaundus survives as titular bishopric; the seat has been vacant since January 31, 1971. Several Bishops have been recorded.

- Helias at the Council of Chalcedon
- Phoebus † (fl. 359 )
- Elijah † (fl. 451 )
- Onesiphorus † (fl. 458 )

The bishopric was nominally revived in 1953 as a titular see of the lowest (episcopal) rank, but is vacant since 1971, after only two incumbents:

- Michael Mongkhol On Prakhongchit (1953.05.07 – 1958.01.23)
- Victor-Jean Perrin (1961.11.26 – 1971.01.31)
