= Henri-Fr.-M.-P. Derouet =

20th-century Bishop

Henri-François-Marie-Pierre Derouet
- Bishop of Arras
- Church: Catholic Church
- Diocese: Diocese of Arras
- In office: 10 October 1985 – 12 August 1998
- Predecessor: Gérard-Maurice Eugène Huyghe
- Successor: Jean-Paul Jaeger
- Previous posts: Bishop of Séez (1971-1985); Titular Bishop of Obbi (1970-1971); Coadjutor Bishop of Séez (1970-1971)

Orders
- Ordination: 26 June 1948
- Consecration: 6 December 1970 by Henri Mazerat

Personal details
- Born: 28 November 1922 Loiré, Maine-et-Loire, France
- Died: 4 July 2004 (aged 81)

Henri-François-Marie-Pierre Derouet was a 20th-century Bishop of Arras, France from 1985 to 1998.

Derouet was born on 28 November 1922 in Loiré, Maine-et-Loire. He was a French prelate who was Bishop of Arras.

He was ordained a priest on 26 June 1948 and was vicar of the parish of Saint-Serge in Angers. After this he became a teacher at the Lycée Notre-Dame de Bonnes Nouvelles in Angers and subsequently superior of the Our Lady of Good News in Beaupréau from 1960 to 1970. In 1970, he became Bishop of Choletais and Bishop of Séez on 24 July 1971. On 10 October 1985, he became Bishop of Arras.

He was also member of the Standing Council of the French Episcopate from 1978 to 1984 and president of the Episcopal Commission of the Independent Milieus from 1985 to 1991, president of the Episcopal Commission of the Maritime World from 1992 to 1997 and then the head of Pax Christi from 1998 to 2001.

He died on 4 July 2004.

Religious titles
Preceded by Gérard-Maurice Eugène Huyghe	Bishop of Arras; 1985-1998	Succeeded by Jean-Paul Jaeger
