= Pierre I (bishop of Arras) =

French bishop and Cistercian monk

Pierre I was a Cistercian monk of the twelfth century, and Bishop of Arras, France from 1184 to 1203.

Pierre is first known as Abbot of Pontigny from 1176 to 1178. Then from the end of 1180, he was Abbot of Cîteaux.

In the spring of 1184, Pierre became Bishop of Arras and was consecrated during the Synod of Verona, in the autumn of the same year. He held this position until his death, November 1, 1203. [3], and he was buried in the Abbey of Pontigny.

Religious titles
Preceded by Fremold	Bishop of Arras; 1184-1203	Succeeded by Raoul de Neuville
