= Johannes Holler =

German prelate (1614–1671)

Most Reverend Johannes Holler
- Auxiliary Bishop Emeritus of Trier; Titular Bishop of Azotus
- Church: Catholic Church
- Diocese: Diocese of Trier
- In office: 1663–1671

Orders
- Ordination: 1652
- Consecration: 1 Jun 1664 by Karl Kaspar von Leyen-Hohengeroldseck

Personal details
- Born: 1614 Echternach, Germany
- Died: 20 November 1671 (age 57) Trier, Germany

Johannes Holler (1614–1671) was a Roman Catholic prelate who served as Auxiliary Bishop of Trier (1663–1671).

== Biography ==
Johannes Holler was born in Echternach, Germany in 1614 and ordained a priest in 1652. On 27 Aug 1663, he was appointed during the papacy of Pope Alexander VII as Auxiliary Bishop of Trier and Titular Bishop of Azotus. On 1 Jun 1664, he was consecrated bishop by Karl Kaspar von Leyen-Hohengeroldseck, Archbishop of Trier. He served as Auxiliary Bishop of Trier until his death on 20 November 1671.
