= Raoul de Neuville =

French cardinal, diplomat and bishop

Raoul de Neuville (died March 26, 1221) was a 13th-century French cardinal, diplomat, and Bishop of Arras.

Little is known of his life or episcopal work. He was born in Rhône-Alpes, France, and studied Law. Pope Innocent III made him a cardinal in the consistory of 1202, and he was elected Bishop of Arras in 1203. Raoul did not participate in the Papal election, 1216, when Pope Honorius III was elected.

He also acted as papal legate to Denmark, Sweden, Sicily, and Bohemia.

He died March 26, 1221, in Arras, France.

Religious titles
Preceded by Pierre	Bishop of Arras; 1203-1221	Succeeded by Ponce
