= Jean-Paul Jaeger =

French Catholic bishop

- Bishop Emeritus of Arras
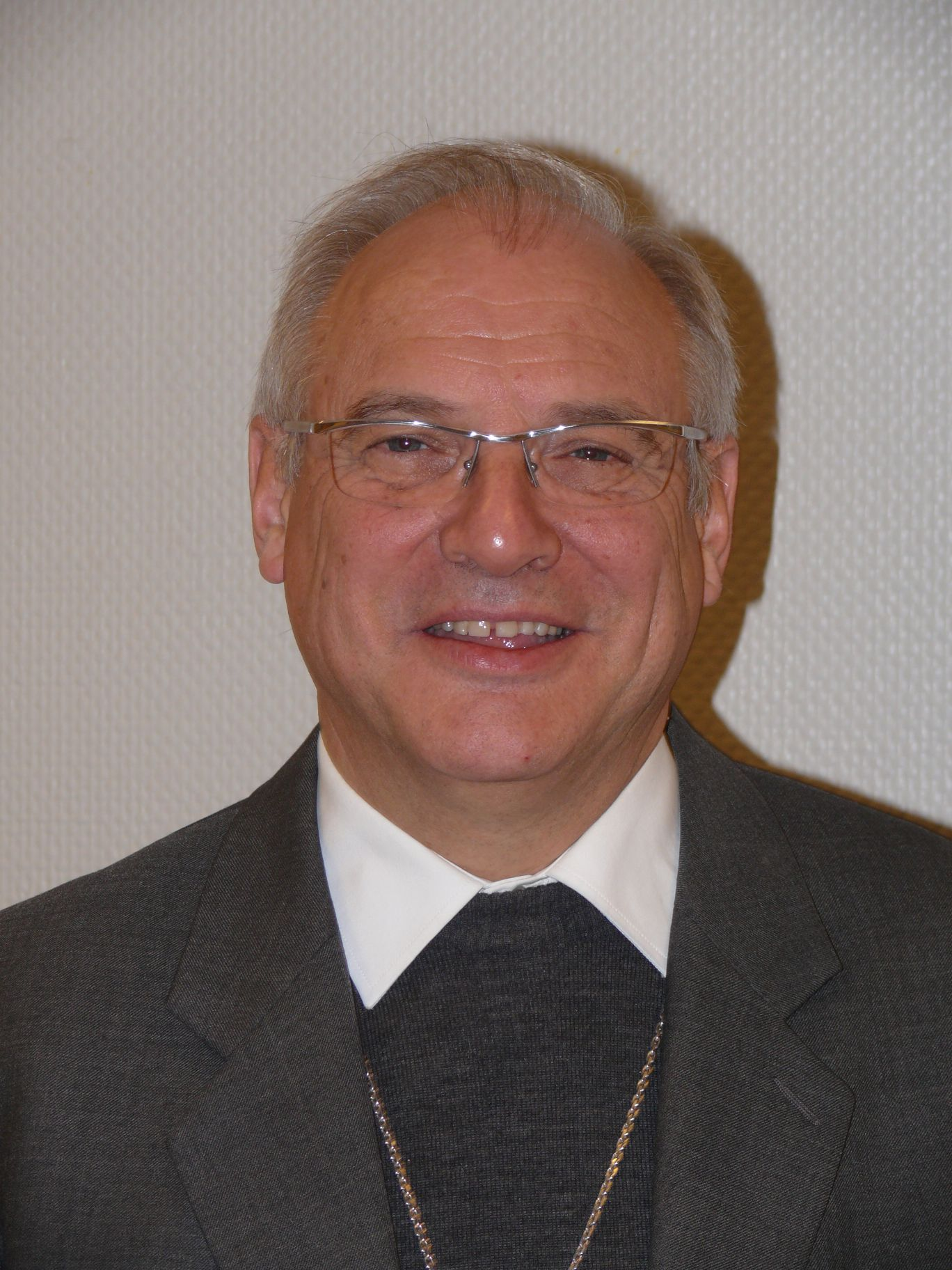
- Church: Catholic Church
- Diocese: Diocese of Arras
- In office: 12 August 1998 – 4 September 2020
- Predecessor: Henri-Fr.-M.-P. Derouet
- Successor: Olivier Leborgne
- Previous posts: Bishop of Nancy (1991-1998); Coadjutor Bishop of Nancy (1991)

Orders
- Ordination: 6 April 1974 by Adrien Gand
- Consecration: 2 June 1991 by Jean Albert Marie Auguste Bernard

Personal details
- Born: 6 September 1944 (age 81) Nancy, Meurthe-et-Moselle, France

Jean-Paul Jaeger is the emeritus Bishop of Arras, France.

Jaeger, was born on September 6, 1944, in Nancy, Meurthe-et-Moselle. He obtained his License degrees from the Université de Lille. Jaeger was ordained as a priest for the Diocese of Lille on April 6, 1974. From 1974 to 1991 he was a teacher and administrator in various schools, becoming Superior of the diocesan seminary at Lille. He was appointed Co-adjutor Bishop of the Diocese of Nancy-Toul on April 11, 1991, and became titular bishop on 30 November of the same year. Since August 12, 1998, he has been Bishop of Arras, succeeding Monsignor Henri Derouet.

From 2007 he was a member of the Permanent Council of the French Conference of Bishops. His term has ended.

Msgr. Jaeger was named a Chevalier of the Legion of Honour on 14 July 2012.

== See also ==
- Catholic Church in France
- List of the Roman Catholic dioceses of France

Catholic Church titles
Preceded by Henri-Fr.-M.-P. Derouet	Bishop of Arras; 1998 - 2020	Succeeded by Olivier Leborgne
