= Gérard-Maurice Eugène Huyghe =

French bishop (1909–2001)

- Bishop of Arras
- Church: Roman Catholic Church
- Diocese: Arras
- Installed: 15 December 1961
- Term ended: 25 September 1984
- Predecessor: Victor-Jean Perrin
- Successor: Henri-Fr.-M.-P. Derouet

Orders
- Ordination: 29 June 1933 by Jean Verdier
- Consecration: 11 April 1962 by Achille Liénart

Personal details
- Born: 31 August 1909; Lille, Nord, French Third Republic
- Died: 27 October 2001 (aged 92); Arras, Hauts-de-France, France

Gérard-Maurice Eugène Huyghe (31 August 1909 – 27 October 2001) was a 20th-century French Catholic Bishop.

Huyghe was born on 31 August 1909 in Fives-Lille, France. He was ordained a priest on 29 June 1933, and consecrated as a bishop on 4 November 1962. He served as Bishop of Arras (France) from December 1961 to September 1984. Huyghe died on 27 October 2001 aged 91 years.

He was an attendee at the second Vatican council, Vatican 2, in the mid-1960s.
