= Jean du Plessis-Pasté =

French prelate

- Bishop of Arras and Chartres
- Church: Roman Catholic
- Diocese: Arras and Chartres

Personal details
- Died: March 1332

Jean du Plessis-Pasté was a French prelate of the 14th century, Bishop of Arras and Chartres.

A native of the île-de-France, Jean du Plessis-Pasté was the son of Thomas Pasté and Gilles.

He became Canon at Laon, then Paris, Beauvais, and Arras, Dean of the Chartres and an Advisor to the King. He was elected Bishop of Arras in 1326 and in 1328 was transferred to the Diocese of Chartres where in 1329 he performed the marriage of Jean, Duke of Brittany, with Jeanne of Flanders in the Cathedral of Chartres.

He died in March 1332.
