= Victor-Jean Perrin =

French bishop (1894–1971)

Victor-Jean Perrins
- Bishop of Arras
- Church: Roman Catholic Church
- Diocese: Arras
- Installed: 3 November 1945
- Term ended: 26 November 1961
- Predecessor: Henri-Édouard Dutoit
- Successor: Gérard-Maurice Eugène Huyghe
- Other post(s): Titular Bishop of Blaundus (1961–1970)

Orders
- Ordination: 21 May 1921
- Consecration: 19 January 1946 by Clément Roques

Personal details
- Born: 7 August 1894; Segré, Maine-et-Loire, French Third Republic
- Died: 31 January 1971 (aged 76)

Victor-Jean Perrin (7 August 1894 – 31 January 1971) was a 20th-century Bishop of Arras, Boulogne and Saint-Omer.

== Biography ==
He was born August 7, 1894, in Segre (Maine-et-Loire) son of Breton parents, and educated in Rennes and Saint-Malo. He entered the major Seminary in 1911. He enlisted at the beginning of the First World War, he finished the war with the rank of lieutenant. After the war he was Ordained a priest on 21 May 1921, he was sent to the French Seminary in Rome where he obtained a doctorate of theology.

Upon his return to the diocese of Rennes, he was successively Professor of Holy History at the major seminary of this city, from 1923 to 1933 and then superior of the diocesan college of Saint-Malo from 1933 to 1938. He was appointed vicar general in 1938.

He enlisted once again for World War II (1939-1940), fighting the Germans during their entry into the city of Rennes.

After the Second World War he was appointed Bishop of Arras on November 3, 1945, in replacing Henri-Edouard Dutoit, who resigned after the Liberation of France. He left Arras after his appointment, on November 26, 1961, to the diocese of Blaundus in partibus. He resigned his duties on December 10, 1970. He died on January 31, 1971.
