= Pierre de Chappes =

French Catholic bishop

- Church: Roman Catholic
- Diocese: Arras and Chartres
- Other post(s): Chancellor of France

Orders
- Created cardinal: 18 December 1327 by Pope John XXII

Personal details
- Died: 24 March 1336

Pierre de Chappes (died 24 March 1336) was a 14th-century Bishop of Arras, Cardinal and Chancellor of France.

== Biography ==
De Chappes was born in Villemeux-sur-Eure, France. Pierre de Chappes was Canon of the chapter of Chartres, Reims and Amiens and Chancellor of France from 1317 to 1320 and Treasurer of the Diocese of Laon from 1317.

In 1320, he was elected Bishop of Arras in the Roman Catholic Diocese of Arras and transferred to the Diocese of Chartres in 1326.

Chappes was made a cardinal by Pope John XXII in the consistory of 18 December 1327.

Cardinal de Chappes participated in the conclave of 1334, during which Benedict XII was elected.

He died 24 March 1336 in Avignon.
