= François Richardot =

Burgundian-French Catholic preacher

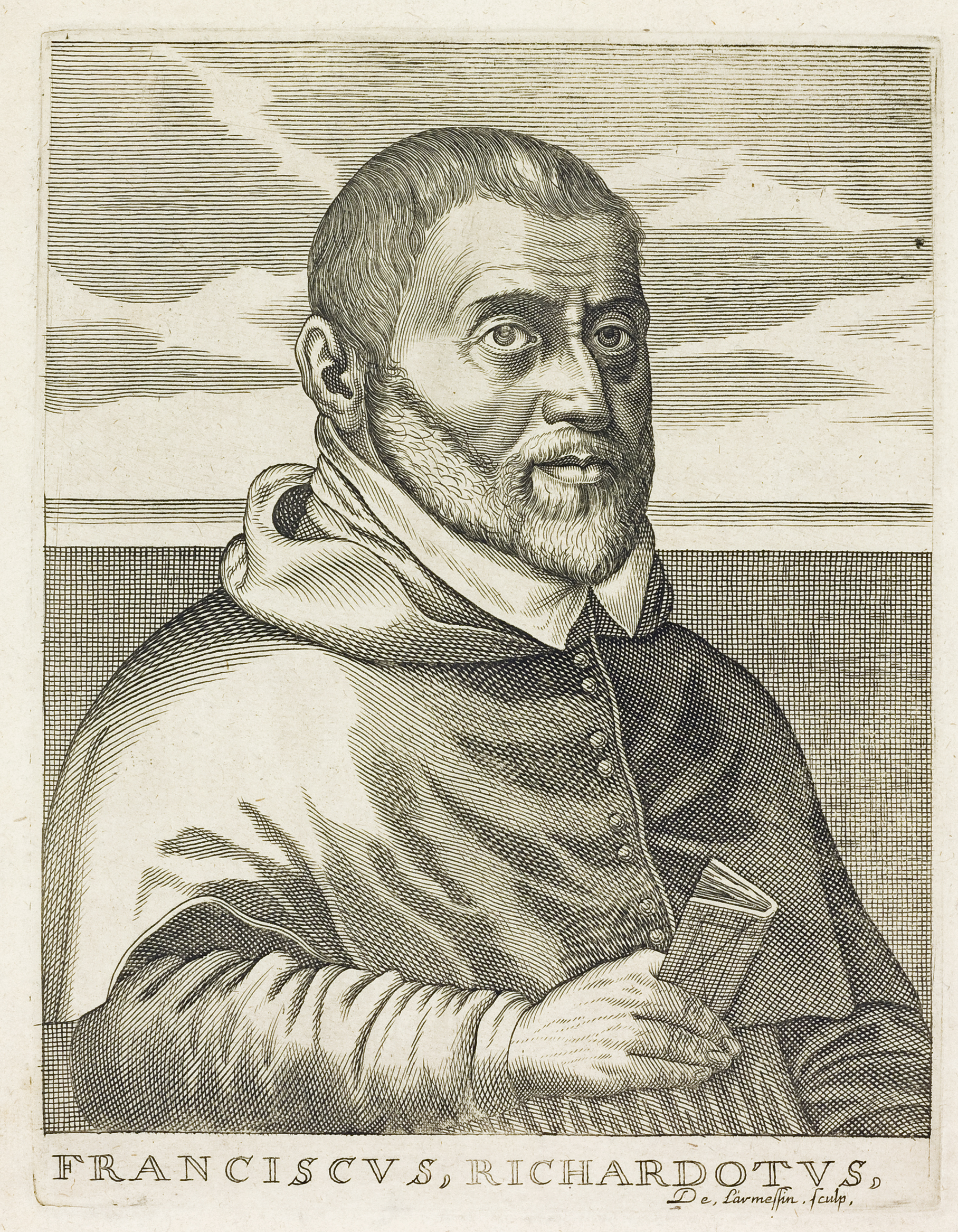
François Richardot

François Richardot (Franciscus) (1507–1574), was a celebrated Burgundian-French Catholic preacher, and confessor to Margaret of Parma. He was Bishop of Arras from 1561 to 1574.

He was an Augustinian Hermit, and became titular bishop of Nicopolis in 1554.

He preached the sermon at the funeral of the Emperor Charles V, and at the inauguration in 1562 of the University of Douai he was one of the preachers

== Publications ==
- Quatre sermons du sacrement de l'autel (Leuven, Jan Bogard, 1567) Available on Google Books
