= Jan Druys =

Belgian abbot

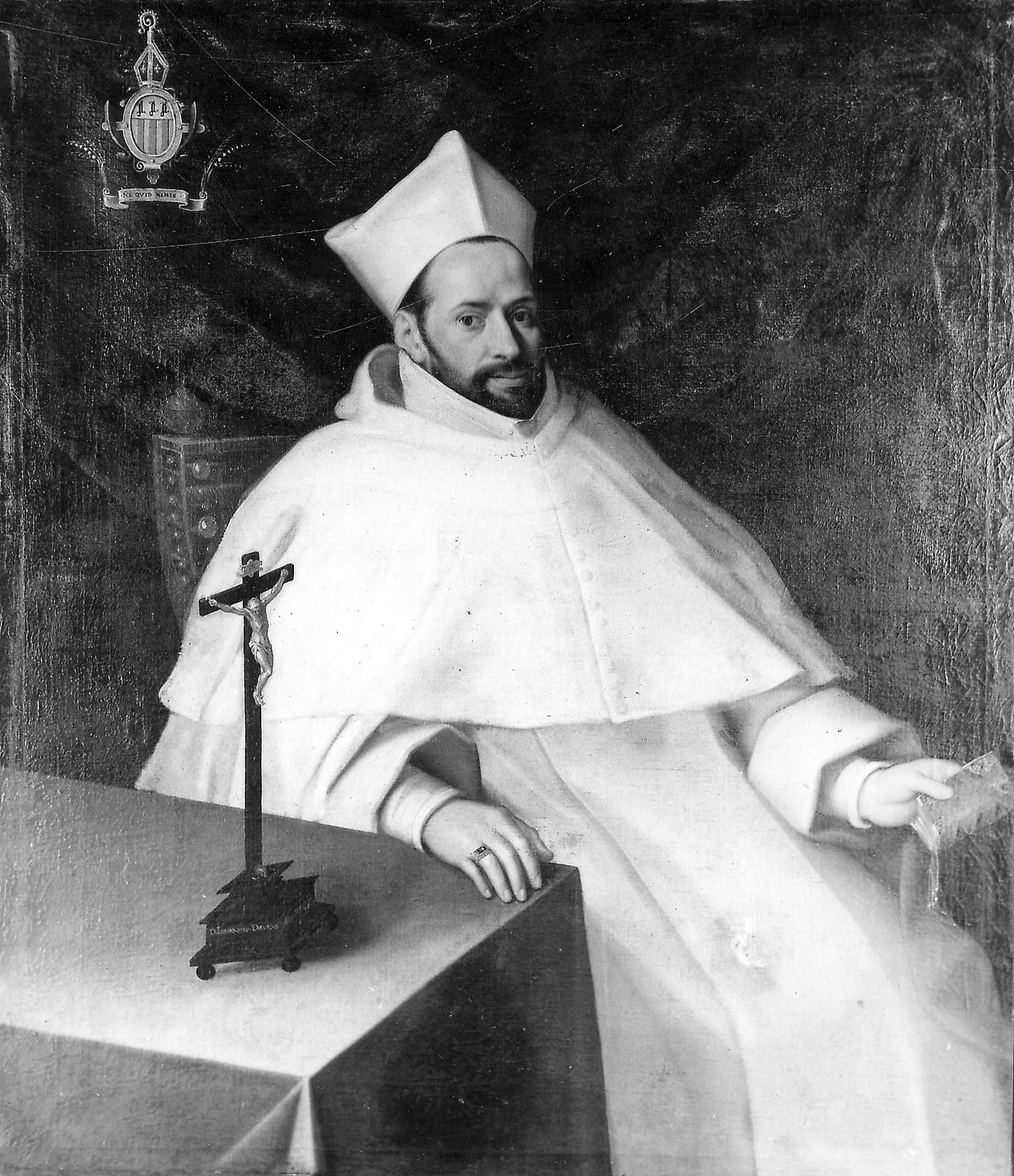
Portrait by Hendrik de Smet, 1610

Blazon of Jan Druys

Jan Druys, Latinized Drusius (1568-1634) was a Norbertine canon regular from the Low Countries who became the 30th Abbot of Park Abbey in Heverlee just outside Leuven.

== Life ==
Druys was born at Kumtich, near Tienen, in 1568. He studied successively at Sint-Truiden, Liège, Namur and Leuven. He entered the Norbertine Abbey of Park in 1587. Ordained priest, he was sent to the Norbertine College at the University of Leuven and obtained his licentiate in 1595.

Recalled to the abbey, he was made sub-prior and professor of theology to the young religious at the abbey, and chaplain to Abbot Ambrose Loots at the monastery's Refugium in Brussels, which was in frequent use during the troubled times at the end of the sixteenth century. At the death of Abbot Loots in 1601, Druys was elected as his successor. Four years later he was appointed vicar-general to the Abbot-General of Prémontré Abbey. He sat in the States of Brabant on behalf of the First Estate from 1604.

The University of Leuven having suffered much from the religious and political disturbances of the time, Druys was in 1607 appointed, together with Stephanus van Craesbeke, a lay member of the Council of Brabant, as visitor to the university, with full power to reform abuses. The reforms that they recommended were approved in Brussels on 18 April 1607 and confirmed by Pope Paul V on 22 October the same year. Druys was also made visitor to the University of Douai (1616) and to the Celestine monastery at Heverlee. In addition he restored and enlarged his own abbey, which had suffered much from the vandalism of the soldiers, and provided better educational advantages for his religious.

At the general chapter held at Prémontré in 1628, Abbot Druys was commissioned to revise the statutes of the order and conform them to the prescriptions of the Council of Trent, a revision which was approved at the general chapter of 1630. Druys prefixed a preface, "Praefatio ad omnes candidissimi et canonici ordinis religiosos", which Foppens characterizes as longam, piam, eruditam. He had a tree of the saints of the order made by the skilful engraver C. Mallery. He also published a small work entitled Exhortatio ad candidi ordinis religiosos.

Abbot Druys was deputed by the general chapter of 1630 to bring back several abbeys of Spain into union and observance, but was unsuccessful. While on this mission he conferred with Philip IV of Spain on the sad state of affairs in Brabant. A ring presented to him by this monarch is preserved at Park, as is also a letter from Henrietta Maria, Queen of England.

Druys was the second lord spiritual in the delegation of the States of Brabant to the Estates General of 1632, the first being Jacobus Boonen, Archbishop of Mechelen.

He died on 25 March 1634.
