= Jean Richardot the Younger =

Jean Richardot the Younger (Arras 1573 - Cambrai February 1614) was bishop of Arras (1602–1609) and prince-archbishop of Cambrai, duke of Cambrai and count of the Cambrésis (1609–1614). He served the Archdukes Albert and Isabella as a diplomat and a minister.

Jean Richardot the Younger was the eldest son of Jean Richardot, a close collaborator of the governor-general Alessandro Farnese and one of the principal ministers and diplomats of the Archdukes Albert and Isabella, and of Anne Courcol de Baillencourt. Educated by the Jesuits at their college in Trier, he studied law at the universities of Trier and Salamanca. Destined for an ecclesiastical career, his father secured him the appointment as prior of the Benedictine priory of Morteau at the age of 16. It was also thanks to his father's patronage that he entered the Privy Council, one of the three Collateral Councils advising the governors-general of the Spanish Netherlands in 1595.

On 15 May 1600, the Archdukes appointed Jean Richardot their first resident minister at the Papal Court. In the course of his diplomatic mission, Richardot alerted Archduke Albert to the talents of Peter Paul Rubens and Wenceslas Cobergher. Following the death of Cardinal Andrew of Austria in November 1600, Richardot obtained the Benedictine abbey of Lure. Three years later the Archdukes nominated him bishop of Arras. He was consecrated in Rome on 30 April 1603 and made his solemn entry in Arras in February 1604. Shortly before his father's death, he was named archbishop of Cambrai on 17 August 1609. He died there after a long illness in 1614.

== Sources ==
- Brants, V., 1901. Jean Richardot, évêque d’Arras, archévêque de Cambrai. Note et documents. Annales pour servir à l’histoire ecclésiastique de la Belgique, 2e série, vol. 13, p. 385-407. PDF
- Brants, V., 1907. Richardot (Jean). In: Biographie nationale publiée par l’Académie royale des sciences, des lettres et des beaux-arts de Belgique, tome XIX: Reingout – Romunde. Bruxelles, col. 280-282. PDF
