= Diocese of Arras =

Catholic diocese in France

Coordinates: 49.8947°N 2.30104°E

Diocese of Arras (–Boulogne–Saint-Omer) Dioecesis Atrebatensis (–Bononiena–Audomarensis) Diocèse d'Arras (–Boulogne–Saint-Omer)

Catholic
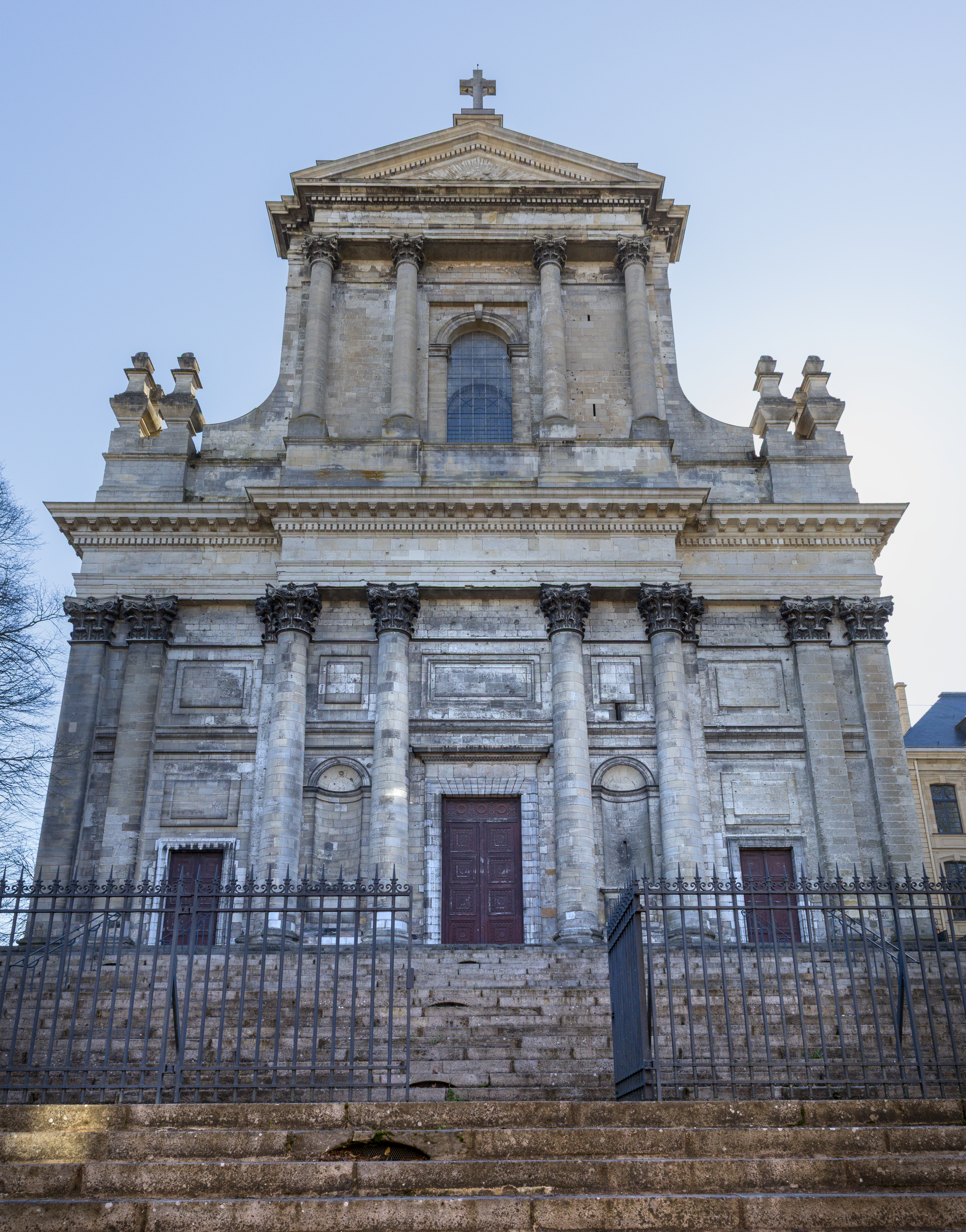
- Arras Cathedral

Location
- Country: France
- Ecclesiastical province: Lille
- Metropolitan: Archdiocese of Lille

Statistics
- Area: 6,678 km^{2} (2,578 sq mi)
- Population: Total; Catholics: (as of 2022); 1,491,710; 1,149,680 (77.1%)
- Parishes: 89
- Churches: 832

Information
- Denomination: Roman Catholic
- Sui iuris church: Latin Church
- Rite: Roman Rite
- Established: 499
- Cathedral: Cathedral of Our Lady and St. Vedast in Arras
- Patron saint: Saint Vedast
- Secular priests: 141 (Diocesan); 26 (Religious Orders); 63 (Permanent Deacons)

Current leadership
- Pope: Leo XIV
- Bishop: Olivier Leborgne
- Metropolitan Archbishop: Laurent Le Boulc'h
- Bishops emeritus: Jean-Paul Jaeger

Map

Website
- Website of the Diocese

The Diocese of Arras (–Boulogne–Saint-Omer) (Latin: Dioecesis Atrebatensis (–Bononiena–Audomarensis); French: Diocèse d'Arras (–Boulogne–Saint-Omer)) is a Latin Church diocese of the Catholic Church in France. The episcopal see is the Arras Cathedral, in the city of Arras. The diocese encompasses all of the Department of Pas-de-Calais, in the Region of Hauts-de-France.

The most significant jurisdictional changes all occurred during the Napoleonic wars. From 1802 to 1841, the diocese was suffragan of the Archdiocese of Paris, shifting away from the Archdiocese of Cambrai, after Napoleon dissolved the massive Archdiocese. After the defeat of Napoleon, the Napoleonic Concordat united the diocese of Arras, diocese of Saint-Omer and diocese of Boulogne together in one much larger diocese. Unlike most of the other dioceses immediately restored, it was not until 1841 that the diocese returned as a suffragan to the Archdiocese of Cambrai.

== History ==
=== Early history ===
A person named Martin is said to have evangelized Artois and Arras, capital of the Celtic Atrebates by 350AD; however, these early Christian communities did not survive the barbarian invasions of the Roman Empire in the fifth century.

At the beginning of the sixth century Remigius, Archbishop of Reims, placed in the See of Arras St. Vedastus (St. Vaast) (d. c. 540), who had been the teacher of the Merovingian king Clovis I after the victory of Tolbiac. His successors, Dominicus and Vedulphus, are also both venerated as saints. After the death of Vedulphus, the See of Arras was transferred to Cambrai, and it was not until 1093 that Arras again became a diocese.

=== Restoration in the 11th century ===
Around 1093/94, the diocese of Arras was restored by splitting it from the diocese of Cambrai and Lambert of Guines was elected as its first bishop. This split was initiated by the counts of Flanders, Robert I and his son Robert II, who intended to become less dependent on the Holy Roman Empire, and received the approval from pope Urban II. The greatest intellectual of Arras in the 12th century, Clarembald of Arras, was first provost and then archdeacon of the diocese. At the time of the reform of the bishoprics of the Netherlands in 1559, the diocese had 422 parishes. Its metropolitan was changed from Reims to Cambrai by Pope Paul IV.

Before the French Revolution the Cathedral Chapter consisted of the Provost, the Dean, the Archdeacon of Arras (Artois), the Archdeacon of Ostrevant, the Treasurer, the Penitentiary, 40 canons and 52 chaplains. There were some 400 parishes and 12 rural deans.

King Philip II of Spain and Pope Pius IV founded the University of Douai in 1562 as a weapon in the Counterreformation and the French Wars of Religion. The Jesuits had a college at Douai, founded in 1599, and suppressed in 1762.

=== Abolition and restoration during the French Revolution ===
During the French Revolution the diocese of Arras was abolished and subsumed into a new diocese, the 'Pas de Calais', coterminous with the new 'Departement of the Pas-de-Calais', and a suffragan of the 'Metropole des Côtes de la Manche'. The clergy were required to swear and oath to the Constitution, and under the terms of the Civil Constitution of the Clergy a new bishop was to be elected by all the voters of the department. This placed them in schism with the Roman Catholic Church and the Pope. On 27 March 1791 the electors chose, on the fourth ballot, the curé of Saint-Nicolas-sur-les-Fossés at Arras, Pierre-Joseph Porion. In September 1801 First Consul Bonaparte abolished the Constitutional Church and signed a Concordat with Pope Pius VII which restored the Roman Catholic Church in France. The diocese of Arras was restored.

Among the bishops of Arras were Cardinal Antoine Perrenot de Granvelle, Councillor of the emperor Charles V, Bishop of Arras from 1545 to 1562, later Archbishop of Mechelen and Viceroy of Naples; François Richardot, a celebrated preacher, Bishop of Arras from 1562 to 1575; and Monseigneur Parisis (d. 1866), who figured prominently in the political assemblies of 1848.

The current ratio of Catholics to priests is 4,168.5 to 1.

== Bishops ==
- Vedastus 499–540
- Dominicus 540–545
- Vedulphus 545–580

=== 1095–1300 ===
- Lambert 1094–1115
- Robert I 1115–1131
- Alvise 1131–1148
- Godescalc 1150–1161
- André de Paris 1161–1173
- Robert II 1173–1174
- Fremold 1174–1183
- Pierre I 1184–1203
- Raoul de Neuville 1203–1221
- Pontius (Ponce) 1221 – 2 September 1231
- Asso (Asson) 1231 – 27 March 1245
- Fursaeus (Fursy) 1245 – 1 April 1247
- Jacques de Dinant 1248–1259
- Pierre de Noyon 1259–1280
- Guillaume d'Isy 1282–1293
- Jean Lemoine 1293–1294
- Gérard Pigalotti 1296–1316

=== 1300 to 1500 ===
- Bernard 1317–1320
- Pierre de Chappes 1320–1326
- Jean du Plessis-Pasté 1326–1328
- Thierry Larchier d'Hirson 1328
- Pierre Roger, 1328–1329, later Pope Clement VI
- André Ghini de Malpighi 18 December 1329 – 12 September 1334 (translated to Tournai)
- Jean Mandevilain 12 September 1334 – 15 February 1339 (translated to Châlons-sur-Marne)
- Pierre Bertrand 1339–1344
- Aimery de Beaufort 1344–1361
- Gérard de Dainville 1362–1369
- Adhémar Robert 1369 – 6 June 1371 (translated to Therouanne)
- Hugues Faidit 6 June 1371 – 1372
- Pierre Masuyer 11 July 1374 – 1391
- Jean Canard 6 September 1392 – 7 October 1407 (Avignon Obedience)
- Martin Poré, O.P. 24 November 1407 – 1426 (Avignon Obedience)
- Hugues de Cayeu 16 December 1426 – 13 January 1438
- Fortigaire de Plaisance 1438–1452
- Jacques de Portugal 1453
- Denis de Montmorency 1453
- Jean Jouffroy 1453–1462
- Pierre de Ranchicourt 1463–1499
- Jean Gavet 1499–1501

=== 1500 to 1800 ===
- Nicolas Le Ruistre 1501–1509
- François de Melun 15 July 1510 – 26 November 1516 (translated to Therouanne)
- Philippe de Luxembourg 1516–1518
- Cardinal Pietro Accolti, Administrator 10 March 1518 – 8 December 1523
- Eustache de Croy 1524–1538
- Antoine Perrenot de Granvelle 1538 – 10 March 1561
- François Richardot 1561–1574
- Mathieu Moulart 1575 – 11 July 1601
- Jean du Ploich 1601–1602
- Jean Richardot 1602–1610
- Hermann van Ortemberg 1611–1626
- Paul Boudot 1626–1635
- Nicolas Duffif 1635–1651
- Jean Le Camus 1651–1652
- Ladislas Jonart nominated 1652 but never installed
- Étienne Moreau 1656–1670
- Guy de Sève de Rochechouart 1670–1724
- François Baglion de La Salle 1725–1752
- Jean de Bonneguise 1752–1769
- Louis François Marc Hilaire de Conzié 1769–1790
  - Pierre-Joseph Porion.
  - Mathieu Asselin

=== From 1800 ===
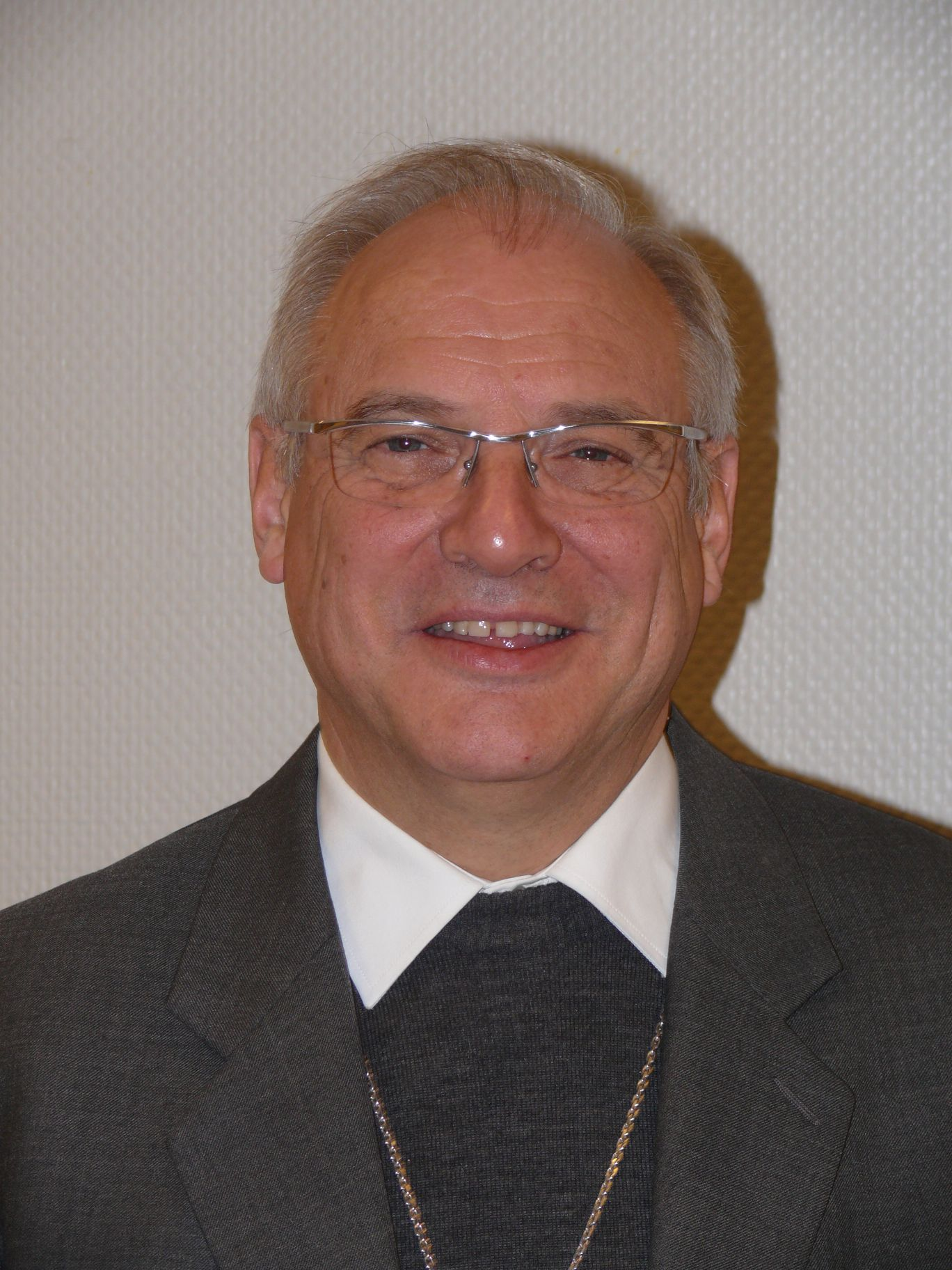
Bishop Jean-Paul Jaeger

- Hugues-Robert-Jean-Charles de la Tour d'Auvergne-Lauragais 1802–1851
- Pierre Louis Parisis 1851–1866
- Jean-Baptiste Joseph Lequette 1866–1882
- Guillaume René Meignan 1882–1884, also Archbishop of Tours
- Desiré-Joseph Dennel 1884–1891
- Alfred-Casimir-Alexis Williez 1892–1911
- Émile-Louis Cornil Lobbedey 1911–1916
- Eugène Julien 1917–1930
- Henri-Edouard Dutoit 1930–1945
- Victor-Jean Perrin 1945–1961
- Gérard-Maurice Eugène Huyghe 1961–1984
- Henri-Fr.-M.-P. Derouet 1985–1998
- Jean-Paul Jaeger 1998–2020
- Olivier Leborgne 2020–present

== See also ==
- Catholic Church in France

== Bibliography ==
=== Reference works ===
- Gams, Pius Bonifatius (1873). Series episcoporum Ecclesiae catholicae: quotquot innotuerunt a beato Petro apostolo. Ratisbon: Typis et Sumptibus Georgii Josephi Manz. pp. 495–496. (Use with caution; obsolete)
- Eubel, Conradus, ed. (1913). Hierarchia catholica, Tomus 1 (second ed.). Münster: Libreria Regensbergiana. (in Latin) pp. 115–116.
- Eubel, Conradus, ed. (1914). Hierarchia catholica, Tomus 2 (second ed.). Münster: Libreria Regensbergiana. (in Latin) p. 98.
- Eubel, Conradus ed.; Gulik, Guilelmus (1923). Hierarchia catholica, Tomus 3 (second ed.). Münster: Libreria Regensbergiana. p. 122.
- Gauchat, Patritius (Patrice) (1935). Hierarchia catholica IV (1592-1667). Münster: Libraria Regensbergiana. pp. 99–100.
- Ritzler, Remigius; Sefrin, Pirminus (1952). Hierarchia catholica medii et recentis aevi V (1667-1730). Patavii: Messagero di S. Antonio. p. 104.
- Ritzler, Remigius; Sefrin, Pirminus (1958). Hierarchia catholica medii et recentis aevi VI (1730-1799). Patavii: Messagero di S. Antonio. p. 105.

=== Studies ===
- Christyn, Jean Baptiste (1743). Histoire Generale des Pays Bas contenant la description des XVII Provinces. Vol. Tome troisième. Bruxelles: Veuve Foppens. pp. 73ff.
- Debray, Laurent (1839). Notice sur l'ancienne cathédrale d'Arras et sur la nouvelle église Saint-Nicolas (in French). Arras: A. Tierny.
- Delmaire, Bernard (1994). Le diocèse d'Arras de 1093 au milieu du XV siècle: Recherches sur la vie religieuse dans le nord de la France au Moyen Age. Arras. 2 vols.
- Deramecourt, Augustin Victor (1884). Le clergé du diocèse d'Arras, Boulogne et Saint-Omer pendant la Révolution (1789-1802) (in French). Vol. Tome I (of 4). Arras: Imprimerie de la Société du Pas-de-Calais.
- Deramecourt, Augustin Victor (1886). Le clergé du diocèse d'Arras, Boulogne et Saint-Omer pendant la Révolution (1789-1802) Tome Quatrième (in French). Vol. 4 vols. Imprimerie de la Société du Pas-de-Calais.
- Du Tems, Hugues (1775). Le clergé de France, ou tableau historique et chronologique des archevêques, évêques, abbés, abbesses et chefs des chapitres principaux du royaume, depuis la fondation des églises jusqu'à nos jours, par M. l'abbé Hugues Du Tems. Vol. Tome IV. Paris: Brunet.
- Jean, Armand (1891). Les évêques et les archevêques de France depuis 1682 jusqu'à 1801 (in French). Paris: A. Picard. pp. 454–458.
- Gameson, Richard (2007). "The Earliest Books of Arras Cathedral". Scriptorium. 61 (2): 233–285. doi:10.3406/scrip.2007.4224.
- Lotte Kéry: Die Errichtung des Bistums Arras 1093/1094. (Beihefte der Francia, 33). Thorbecke, Sigmaringen 1994, ISBN 3-7995-7333-X (Online)
- Lestocquoy, Jean (1949). La vie religieuse d'une province: le diocèse d'Arras (in French). Arras: Brunet.
- Pisani, Paul (1907). Répertoire biographique de l'épiscopat constitutionnel (1791-1802) (in French). Paris: A. Picard et fils.
- Sainte-Marthe (Sammarthani), Denis de (1725). Gallia Christiana: In Provincias Ecclesiasticas Distributa... Provinciae Cameracensis, Coloniensis, Ebredunensis (in Latin). Vol. Tomus tertius (III). Paris: Typographia Regia. pp. 319–471, Instrumenta, pp. 78–100.
- Terninck, Auguste (1853). Essai historique et monographique sur l'ancienne cathédrale d'Arras ...: suivi d'un sanmaire sur les évêques, les privilèges, les sceaux, et les monnaies du chapitre et des évêques par ... (in French). Paris: Victor Didron.
- Tock, Benoît-Michel (1991). Les chartes des évêques d'Arras (1093-1203) Paris : CTHS, 1991.
- Tock, Benoît-Michel (1991). Les chartes promulguées par le chapitre cathédral d'Arras au XIIe siècle Turnholt : Brepols.
- Tock, Benoît-Michel; Ludovicus Milis (2000). Monumenta Arroasiensia Turnholt : Brepols, 2000.
- Charte attribuée à Saint Vindicien, évêque d'Arras, et regardée par les Religieux de Saint Vaast comme le titre primitif de leur exemption. Paris. 1778. A forgery: Edmund Ernst Hermann Stengel (2005). Archiv für Diplomatik: Schriftgeschichte, Siegel, und Wappenkunde (in German). Vol. 51. Böhlau Verlag. pp. 53, 65.
