= Echternach =

Echternach Iechternach (Luxembourgish)
- Commune
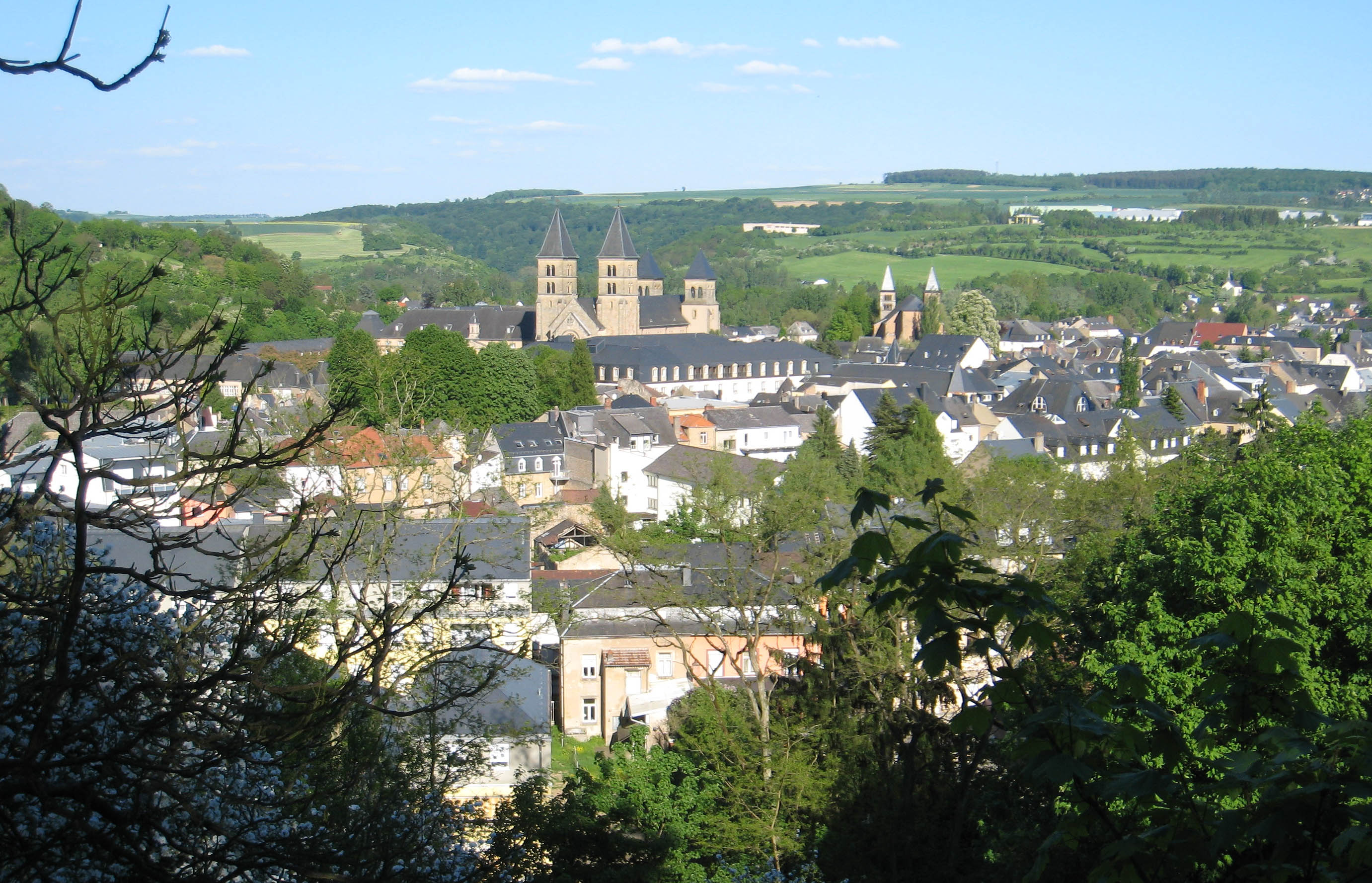

- Coat of arms

- Map of Luxembourg with Echternach highlighted in orange, and the canton in dark red
- Coordinates: 49.8116667°N 6.4216667°E
- Country: Luxembourg
- Canton: Echternach

Government
  - Mayor: Carole Hartmann (DP)

Area
  - Total: 20.49 km^{2} (7.91 sq mi)
  - Rank: 55th of 100
- Highest elevation: 393 m (1,289 ft)
  - Rank: 56th of 100
- Lowest elevation: 154 m (505 ft)
  - Rank: 9th of 100

Population (2025)
  - Total: 5,936
  - Rank: 27th of 100
  - Density: 289.7/km^{2} (750.3/sq mi)
  - Rank: 28th of 100
- Time zone: UTC+1 (CET)
  - Summer (DST): UTC+2 (CEST)
- LAU 2: LU0001005
- Website: echternach.lu

Echternach (German pronunciation: [ˈɛçtɐnax], French pronunciation: [ɛʃtəʁnax]; Luxembourgish: Iechternach [ˈi̯əɕtɐnɑχ] or locally Eechternoach) is a commune with city status in the canton of Echternach, in eastern Luxembourg. Echternach lies near the border with Germany, and is the oldest town in Luxembourg.

== History ==
The town grew around the Abbey of Echternach, which was founded in 698 by St Willibrord, an English monk from Ripon, Northumbria (in present-day North Yorkshire, England), who became the first bishop of Utrecht and worked to Christianize the Frisians. As bishop, he was the Echternach monastery's abbot until his death in 739. It is in his honour that the notable Dancing procession of Echternach takes place annually on Whit Tuesday.

The river Sauer that flows past the town now forms the border between Luxembourg and Germany; in the later Roman Empire and under the Merovingians by contrast, the Sauer did not form a border or march in this area. The Roman villa at Echternach (traces of which were rediscovered in 1975) was reputed to be the largest north of the Alps. Echternach was later part of the Electorate of Trier (present-day Germany) and was presented to Willibrord by Irmina (Irmine), daughter of Dagobert II, king of the Franks. Other parts of the Merovingians' Roman inheritance were presented to the Abbey by king of the Franks Pepin the Short.

Echternach continued to have royal patronage from the house of Charlemagne. Though the monks were displaced by the canons of the bishop of Trier between 859 and 971, and although Willibrord's buildings burned down in 1017, the Romanesque basilica, with its symmetrical towers, to this day houses Willibrord's tomb in its crypt. The abbey's library and scriptorium had a European reputation. As it flourished, the town of Echternach grew around the abbey's outer walls and was granted a city charter in 1236. The abbey was rebuilt in a handsome Baroque style in 1737. In 1794 the church was sacked and the abbey used as a porcelain factory. In 1797, in the wake of the French Revolution, the monks were dispersed and the abbey's contents and its famous library were auctioned off. Some of the library's early manuscripts, such as the famous Echternach Gospels, are now in the Bibliothèque Nationale in Paris. In the 19th century, a porcelain factory was established in the abbey and the town declined, until the advent of the railroad brought renewed life and an influx of tourists.

In World War I, German soldiers marched through the streets of Echternach at the beginning of the invasion of Luxembourg in early August 1914, which following the entry into Troisvierges and subsequent retreat of troops from the 69th Infantry Regiment, the German Empire launched a full-scale invasion and subsequent four-year occupation of Luxembourg as part of its Schlieffen Plan.

During the concluding months of World War II in Europe, on 16 December 1944, Echternach served as the southernmost point on the battlefront for the attempt of the German Wehrmacht forces attacking the Allies to retake Antwerp, during the Battle of the Bulge. The town was badly damaged in World War II but was thoroughly restored.

== Culture ==
There are two main churches in Echternach. The larger is the Abbey's Basilica of St Willibrord, which survives from the original abbey and is a fair monument of Romano-Gothic architecture. The basilica is now surrounded by the eighteenth-century abbey (today a high school) and is located in the heart of the town's historical centre. The other is the parish church of St Peter and Paul, under whose altar lie the remains of St Willibrord. The nearby Prehistory Museum traces mankind's history over the past one million years.

== Population ==
Historical population

Year	Pop.	±%
1821	10,696	—
1851	15,150	+41.6%
1900	12,639	−16.6%
1910	12,389	−2.0%
1922	11,750	−5.2%
1935	11,152	−5.1%

Year	Pop.	±%
1947	10,293	−7.7%
1960	9,820	−4.6%
1970	9,934	+1.2%
1981	10,649	+7.2%
1990	11,649	+9.4%
2000	13,422	+15.2%

Year	Pop.	±%
2005	14,899	+11.0%
2010	16,041	+7.7%
2015	17,728	+10.5%
2020	19,189	+8.2%
2021	19,463	+1.4%

Source data

== Gallery ==
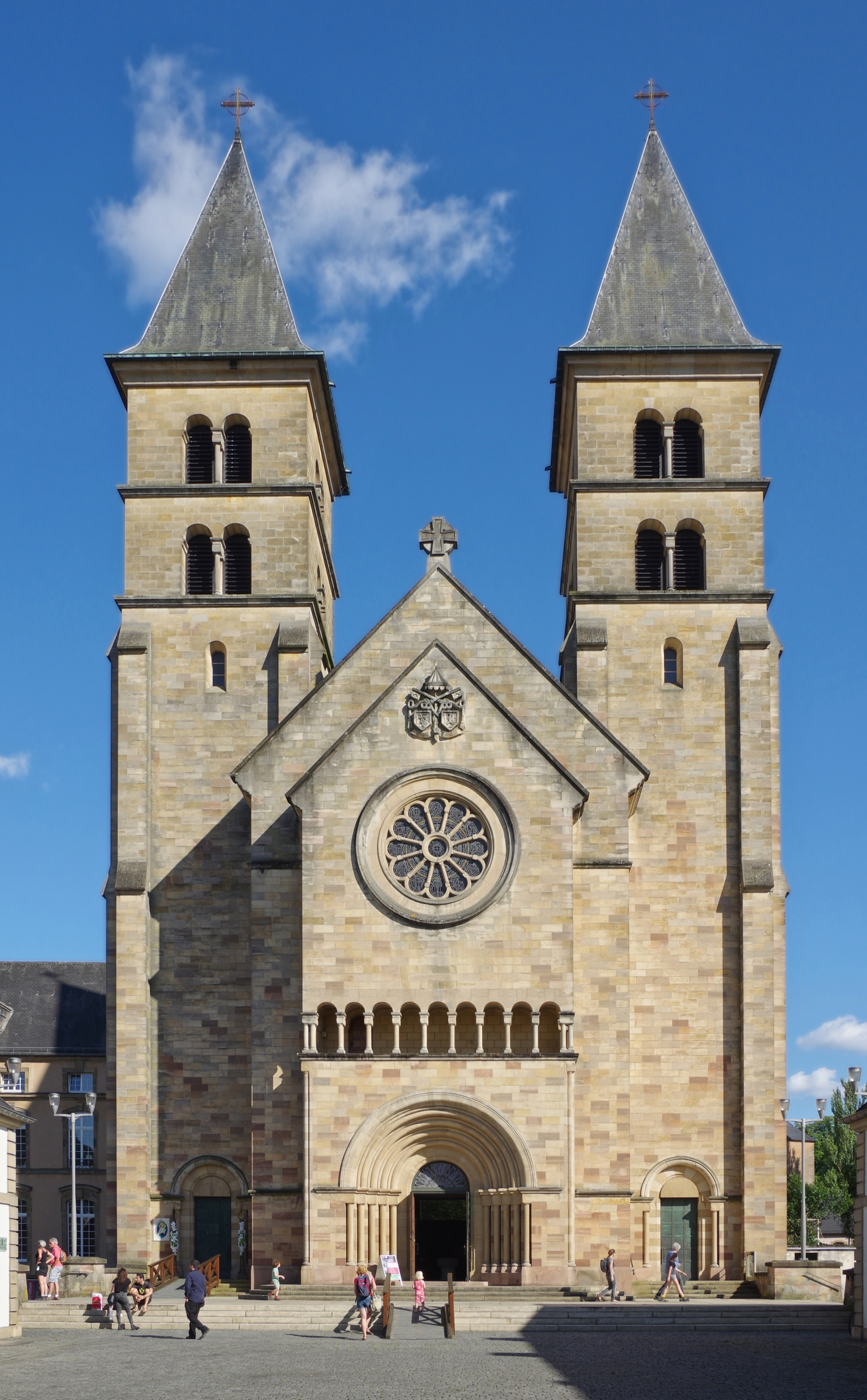
Basilica (church of the former Benedictine abbey)

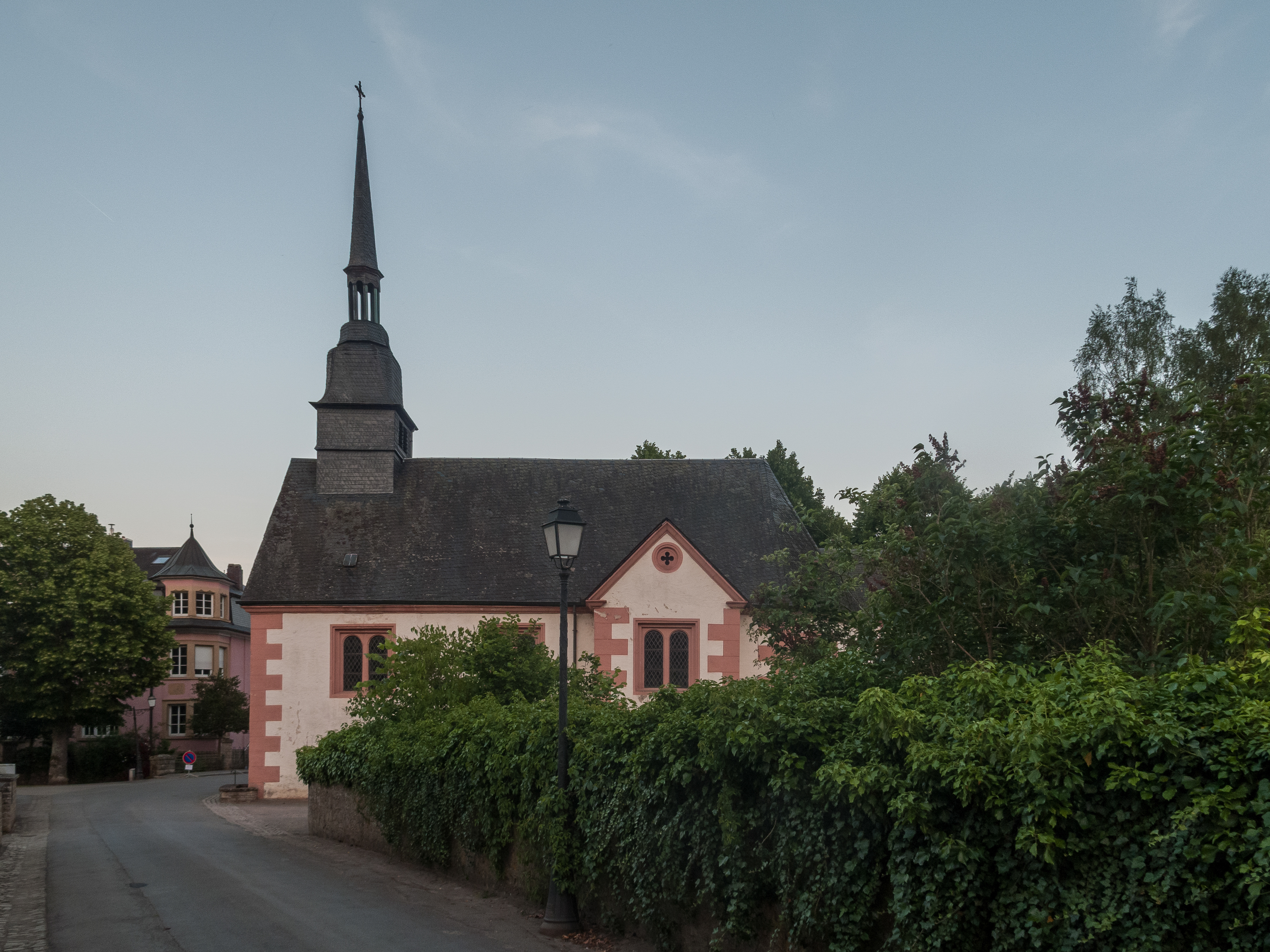
Chapel: la chapelle Notre-Dame des Douleur

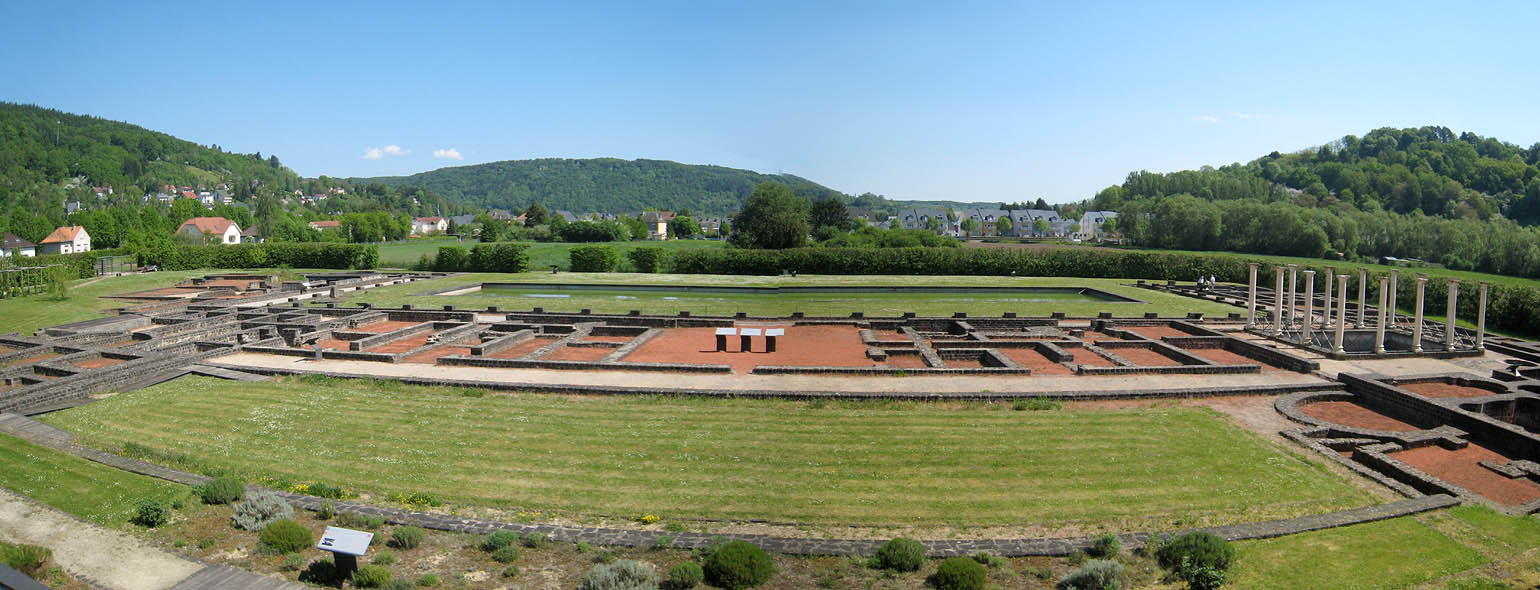
Roman villa

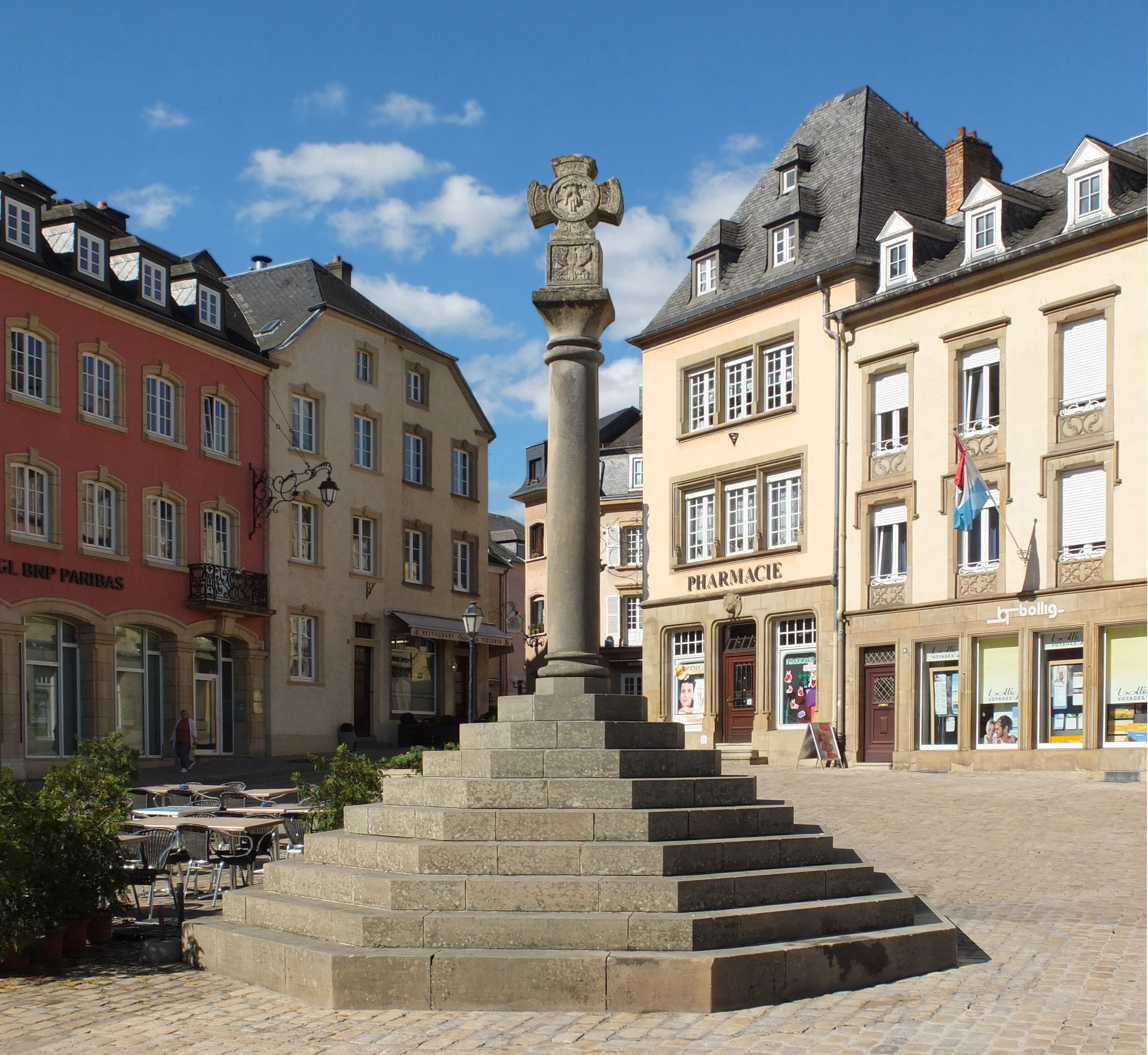
Justice cross

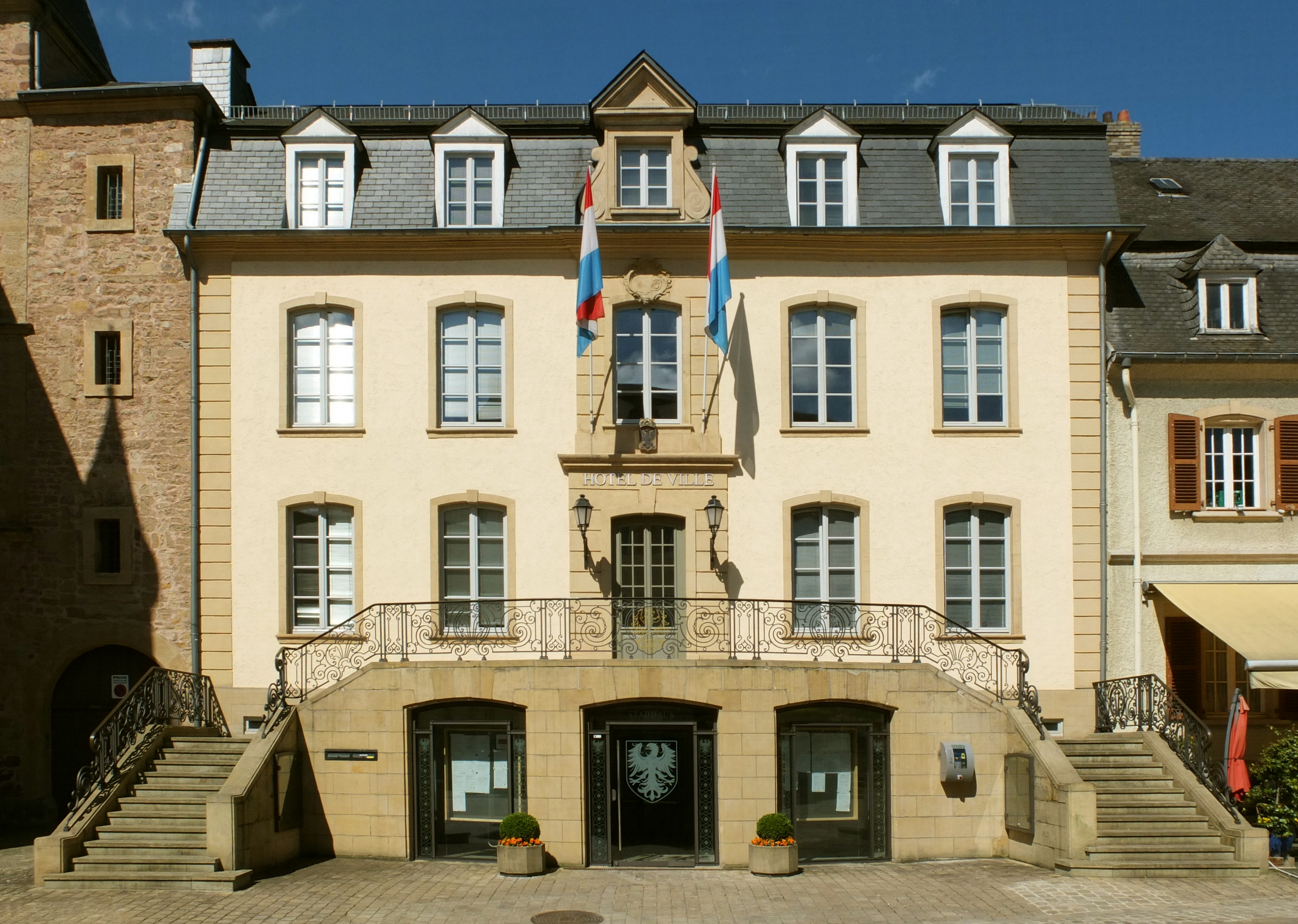
Town hall

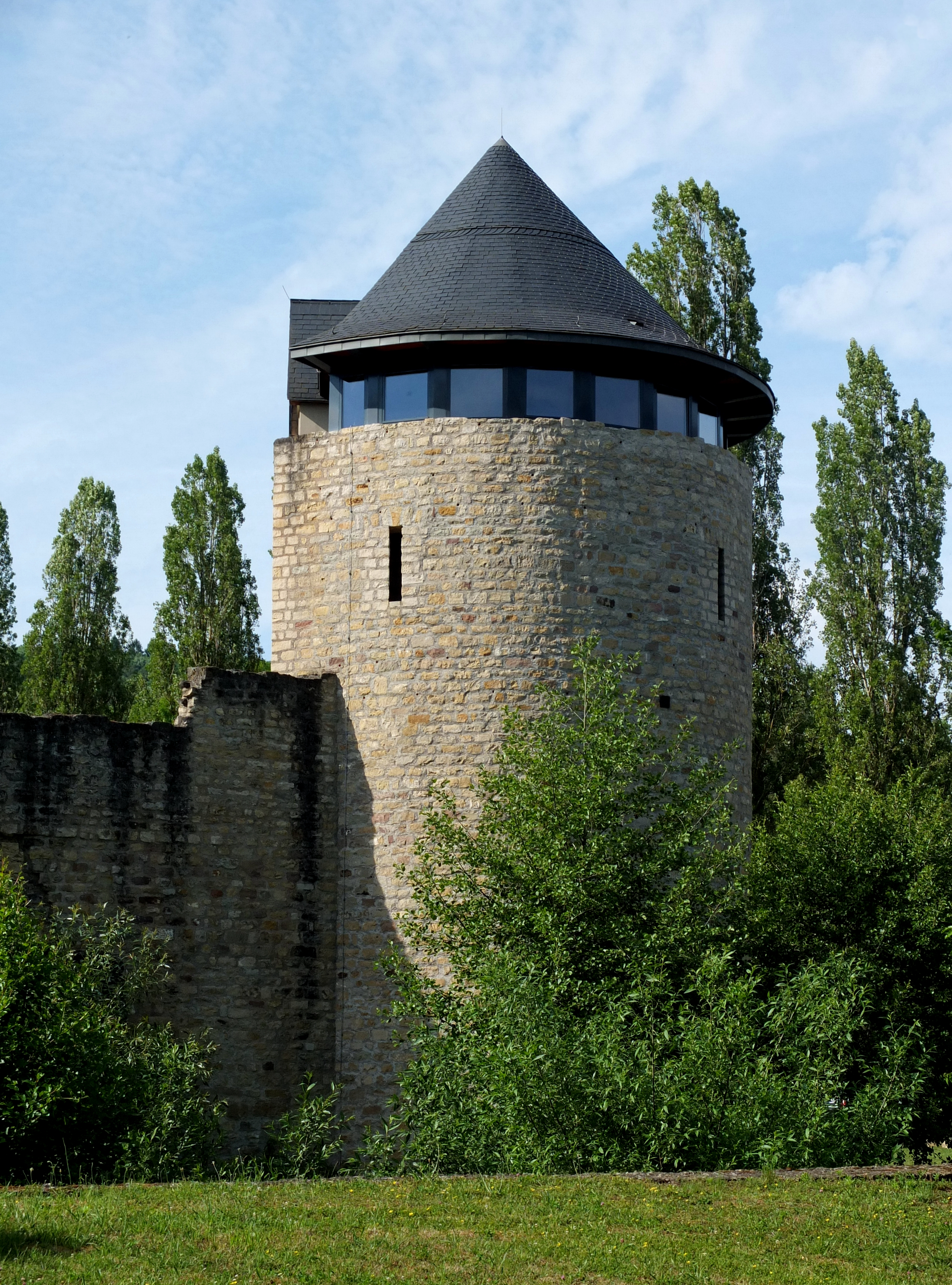
Watchtower

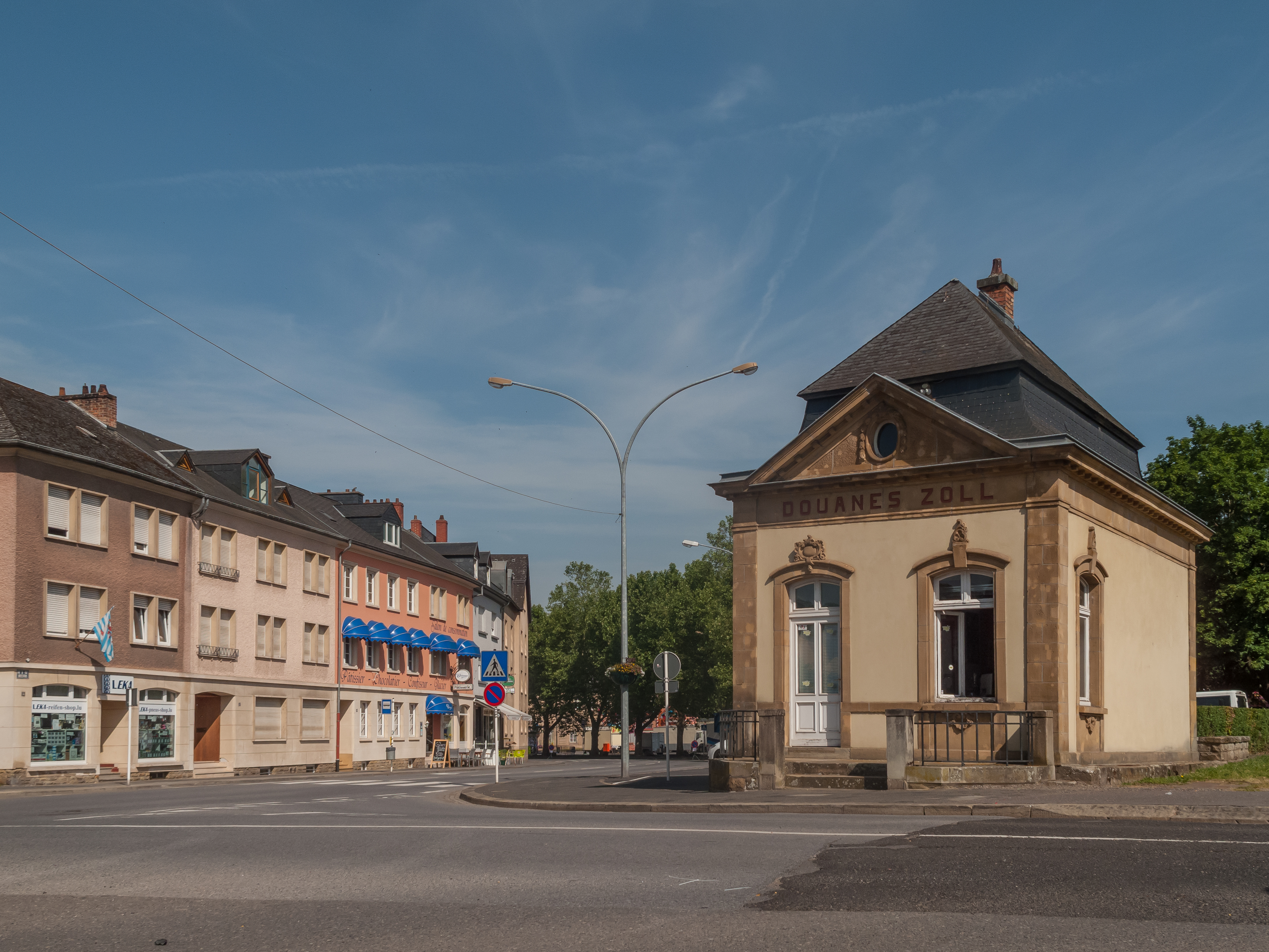
Former customs office

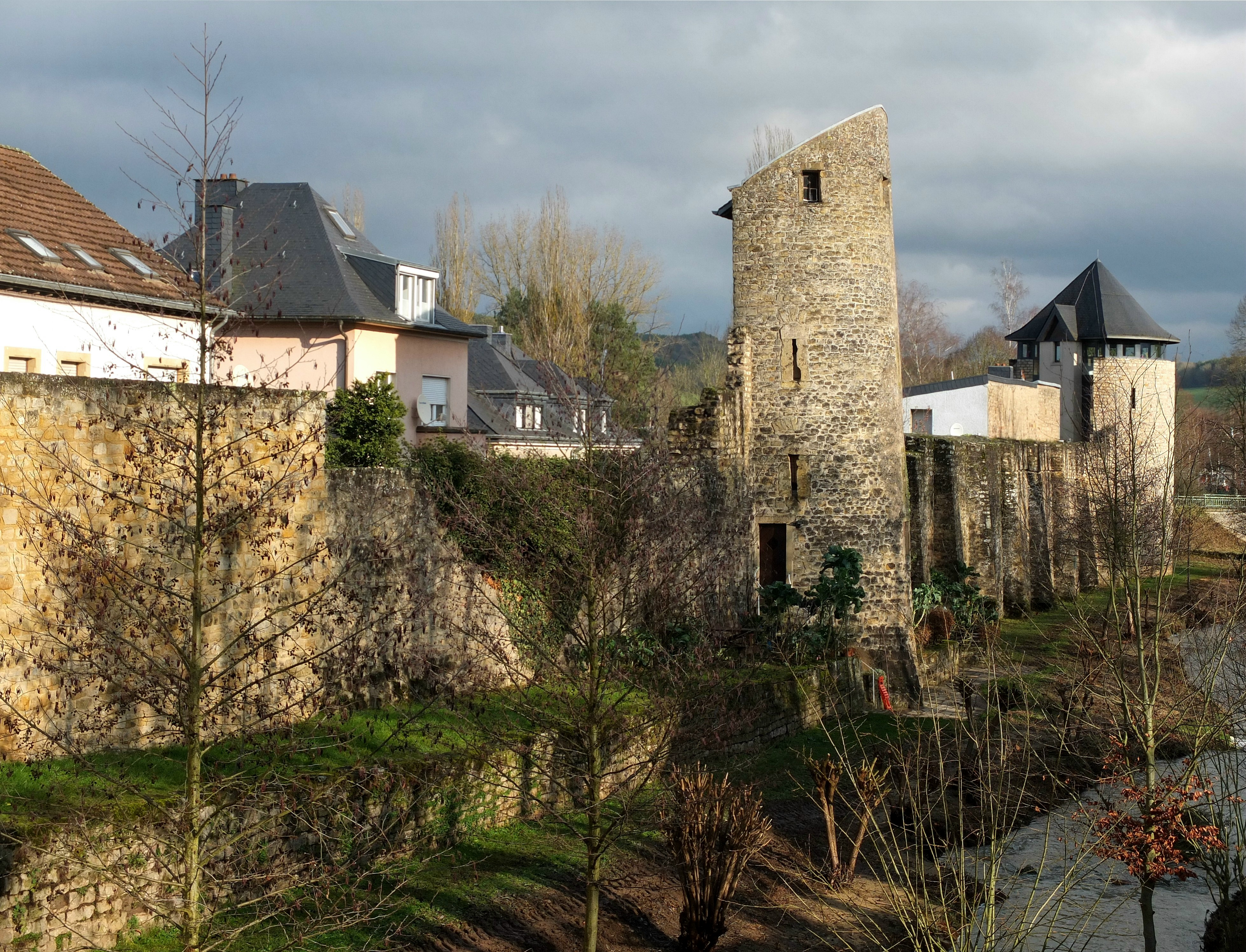
Southern town wall

== Notable people ==
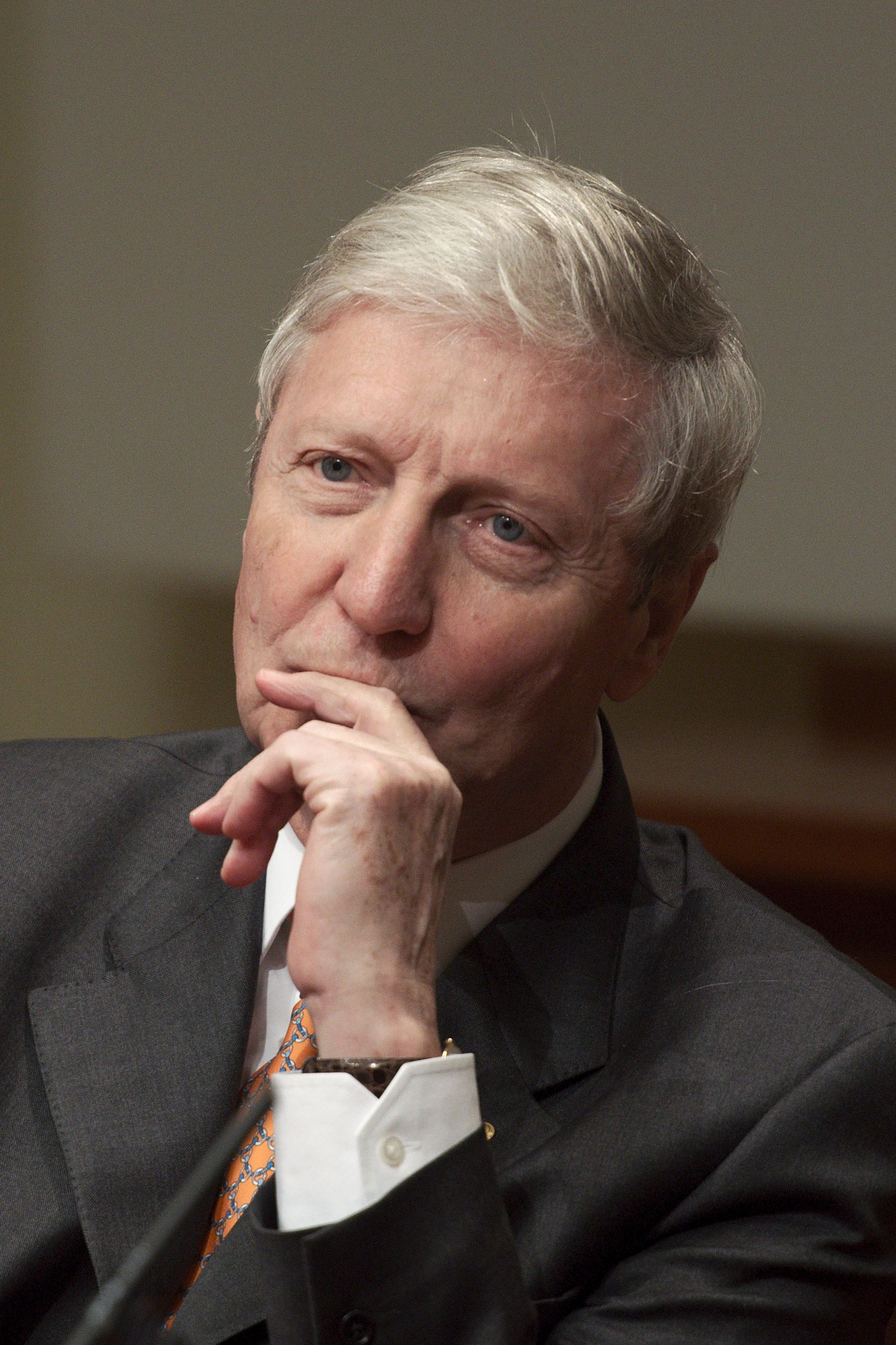
Jules A. Hoffmann, 2011

- Johannes Holler (1614–1671) Roman Catholic prelate and Auxiliary Bishop of Trier 1663–1671
- Joseph-Alexandre Müller (1854–1931) Luxembourg composer.
- Artur Sirk (1900 in Pruuna, Estonia – 1937 in Echternach), Estonian political and military figure.
- Léon-Henri Roth (1922–1945), a resistance fighter.
- Jules A. Hoffmann (1941) a Luxembourgish-French biologist, joint winner of the Nobel Prize in Physiology or Medicine in 2011
- Jeannette Goergen-Philip (born 1947) Luxembourgish archer, competed at the 1984 and 1992 Summer Olympics
- Georges Lentz (born 1965), Luxembourgish composer, grew up in Echternach.

=== Politicians ===
- Caspar Mathias Spoo (1837–1914), Luxembourgish industrialist and politician.
- Robert Schaffner (1905–1979), Luxembourgish politician, twice mayor of Echternach (1945-1947; 1970-1979)
- Marie-Josée Frank (born 1952 in Echternach), Luxembourgish politician
- Marcel Sauber (born 1939), Luxembourgish politician
- Fernand Boden (born 1943), Luxembourgish politician, government minister (1979–2009)
