= Wilgils =

7th-century saint

Saint Wilgils
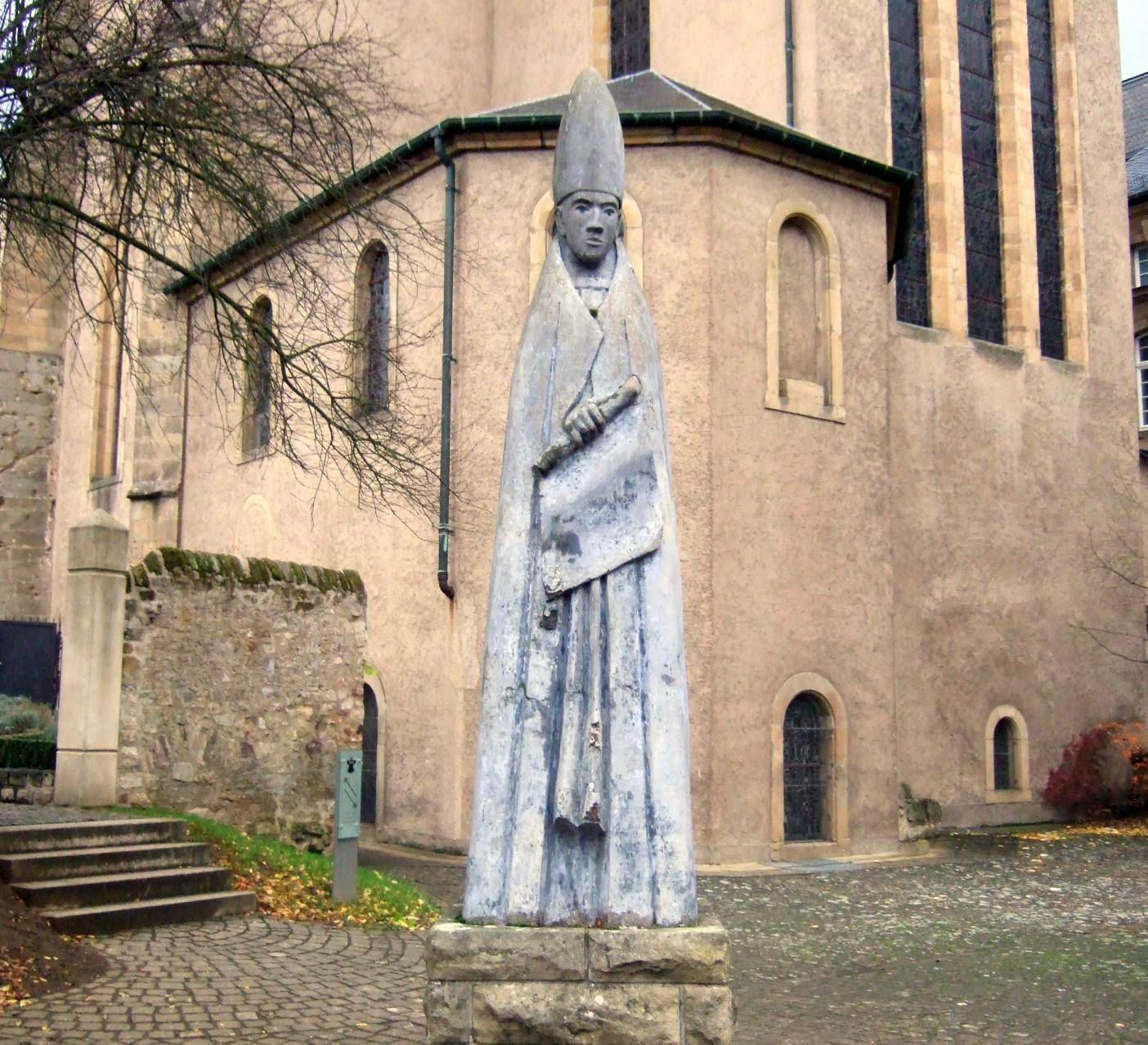
- Statute of Wilgils's son Willbrord at Echternach

Hermit
- Born: early 7th c. Northumbria
- Died: early 8th c. Humber, Northumbria
- Venerated in: Roman Catholic Church; Orthodox Church; Anglican Communion; Lutheranism
- Feast: January 31

Wilgils of Ripon, also known as Wilgisl and Hilgis, was a seventh century saint and hermit of Anglo-Saxon England, who was the father of St Willibrord. His feast day is 31 January.

== Life ==
He is known mainly from the Life of St Willibrord by Alcuin, but is also mentioned by Secgan and Bede.

Alcuin says he was a churl or "a non-servile peasant", and calls him a Saxon of Northumbria which was predominantly Angle at the time.

St Willibrord, born c. 658 AD, the Apostle to Frisia and patron saint of the Netherlands and Luxembourg, was his son. Alcuin also writes that Wilgils was paterfamilias of Alcuin's own family and that he (Alcuin) had inherited Wilgils' oratory and church by inheritance, indicating a close familial relationship. Wilgils was also distantly related to Beornred, the abbot of Echternach and Bishop of Sens.

Wilgils entrusted his son to the church, and settled on the banks of the Humber estuary where he lived as a hermit. His fame increased and he was granted royal patronage that allowed him to found an oratory and church at the mouth of the Humber.

== See also ==
- Anglo-Saxon Christianity
- Anglo-Saxon England
