= Thiofrid of Echternach =

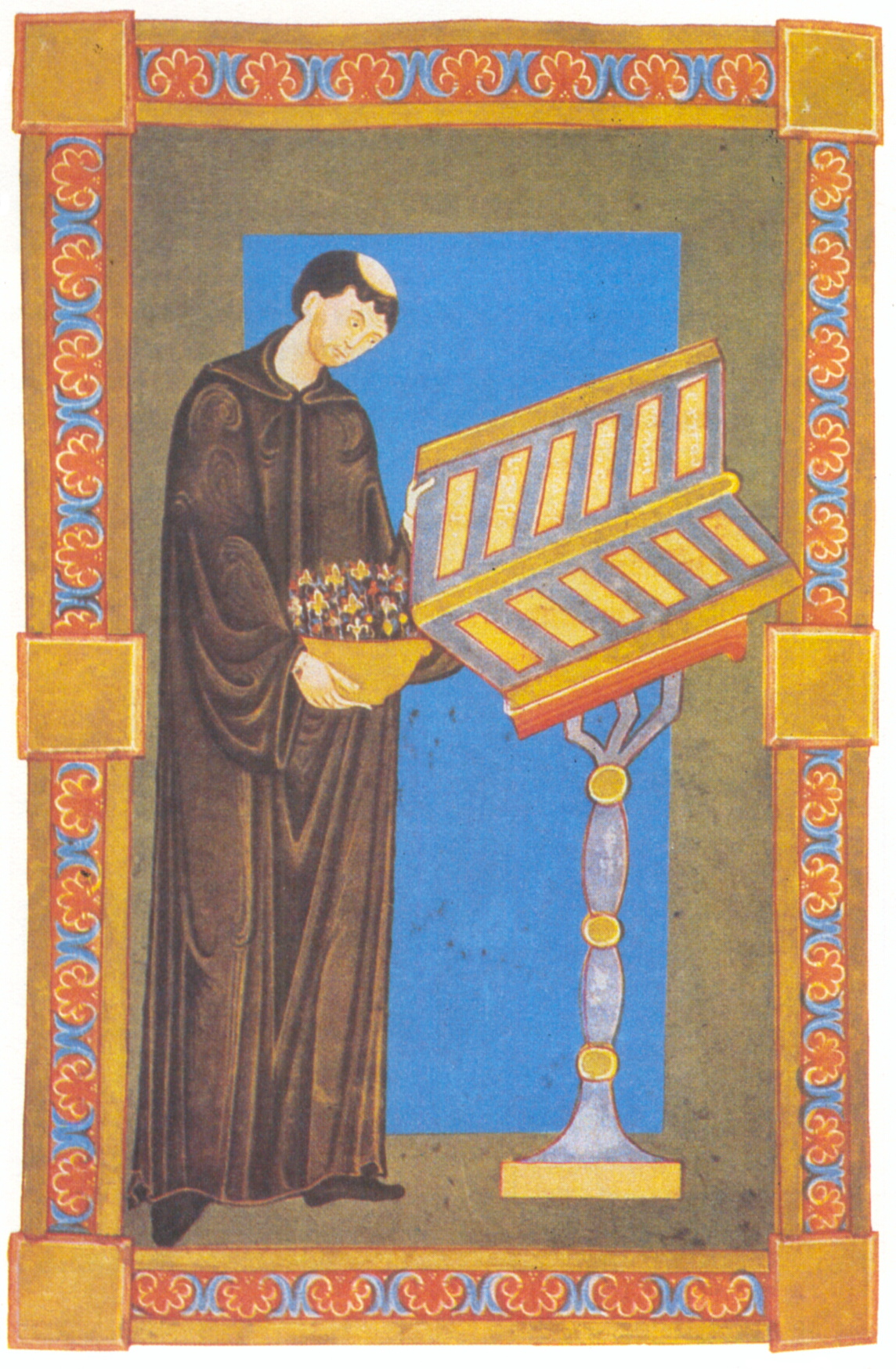
Thiofrid of Echternach

Thiofrid (died 1110) was the Benedictine abbot of Echternach Abbey, and writer of works in several different areas. He is one of the few medieval writers to discuss the cult of relics, in his Flores epytaphii sanctorum.

He wrote on Willibrord; in connection with the link between Walcheren, where a church was dedicated to Willibrord, and Echternach. Thiofrid travelled to Frisia to mediate between the inhabitants and a son of Baldwin VI of Flanders.
