= Beornrad =

Beornrad may refer to:

- Beornrad of Mercia, King of the British kingdom of Mercia
- Beornrad (archbishop of Sens) (died 797), Archbishop of Sens and Abbot of Echternach
