= Trier Gospels =

Gospel book that contains the works and illustration of: Matthew, Mark, Luke, and John

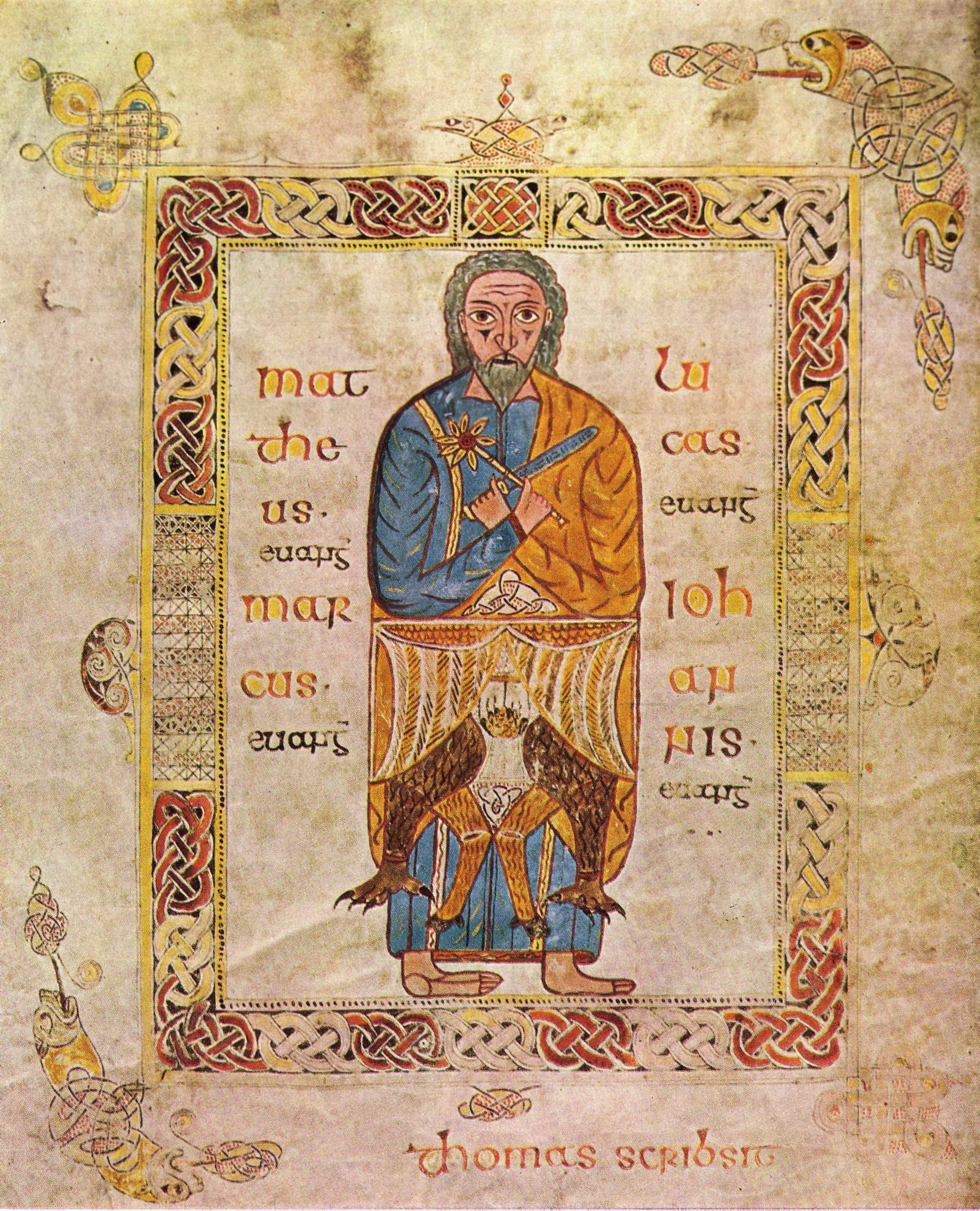
Mediterranean style of Matthew signed by Thomas (folio 5v)

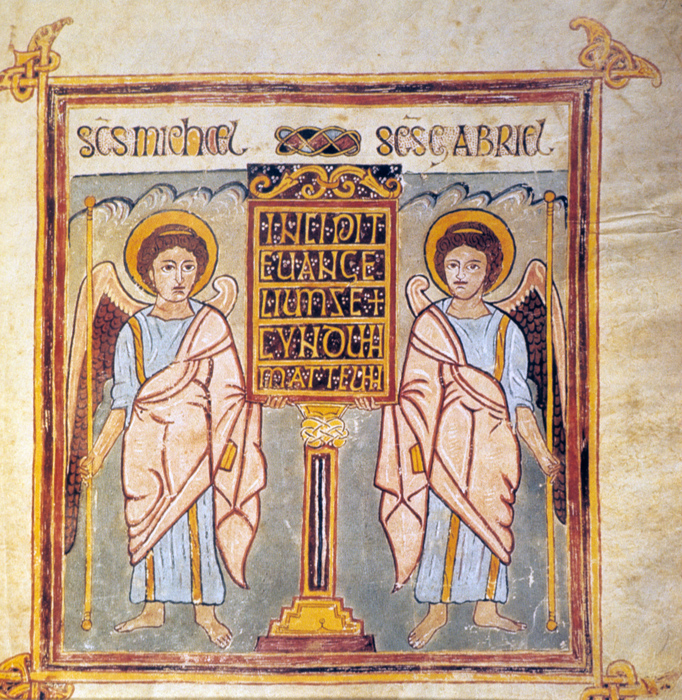
Incipit with two angels (folio 10r)

The Trier Gospels is a Gospel book that contains the works and illustration of: Matthew, Mark, Luke, and John. It was copied by two scribes between the years 720 and 740 A.D. in Echternach Abbey The gospel is currently located at Trier Cathedral Treasury.

== Scribes ==
There were two primary authors of the Trier Gospels. Thomas seemed to be the leader and the more accomplished Insular scribe and artist, very similar to that of the Lindisfarne scriptorium. He also practiced some art inspired by the Mediterranean style. The other Author was an unknown Frankish person appeared to be a disciple which used Merovingian script and art for the ornamental initial. Most of the major initials, drawings, and writings at the beginning of the book were written by Thomas. We know his name for he did sign a couple of his pictures "Thomas scribsit" This shows his importance and that he was head scribe for the book. The last section and assembling of the book was done by the unknown Frank. His writing eventually became a combination of Merovingian and Insular styles.

== Content ==
There were three main styles that were found in the Trier Gospels. They were respectively: Insular, Merovingian, and Mediterranean styles. This makes the Trier Gospels an important part of history for it is combining three separate art styles in a single Gospel. Insular came from England and was brought down to Echternach by Willibrord who helped found Echternach Abbey. Merovingian was the style that was used by the people of northern mainland Europe. This is why the unknown Frank author wrote in Merovingian for he was of northern Europe. Mediterranean was the last style used and it was from Italy. Being from Italy, this style helped put the Frankish church in a better relationship with Rome. Some of the artwork in the gospels seem to be inspired or directly taken from other gospels. One example is a portrait of Matthew that follows extremely closely with previous Roman manuscripts that were produced with the same Mediterranean style. Another example is the canon tables in the Trier Gospels, for they resemble the Augsburg Gospels with a few exceptions.

== See also ==
- Lindisfarne Gospels
- Echternach Gospels

== Sources ==
- Netzer, Nancy (1994). Cultural Interplay in the Eighth Century: The Trier Gospels and the Making of a Scriptorium at Echternach. Cambridge University Press. ISBN 9780521412551.
- Diebold, William J. (October 1996). "Reviewed Work: Cultural Interplay in the Eighth Century: The Trier Gospels and the Making of a Scriptorium at Echternach by Nancy Netzer". The Catholic Historical Review. 82 (4): 687–689. doi:10.1353/cat.1996.0013. JSTOR 25024829. S2CID 159216585.
