= Emperor's Bible =

11th-century Gospel Book

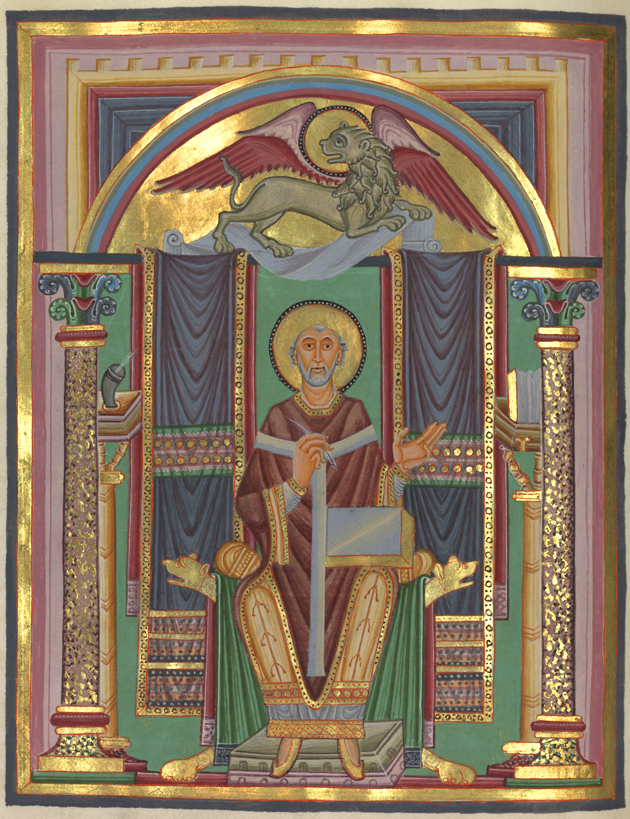
Full-page illumination showing Mark the Evangelist in the Emperor's Bible

The Emperor's Bible (Uppsala, UUB ms C 93; Swedish: kejsarbibeln), also known as Codex Caesareus, Codex Caesareus Upsaliensis or the Goslar Gospels, is an 11th-century illuminated manuscript currently in Uppsala University Library, Sweden. Despite its name, it is not a Bible per se, but a Gospel Book. The book was made in the scriptorium of Echternach Abbey in Luxembourg, and is one of four preserved large Gospel Books made there during the 11th century. It was commissioned by Emperor Henry III and donated by him to Goslar Cathedral in Germany, where it remained until the Thirty Years' War (1618-1648). It was then lost for about 100 years. Its previous richly decorated cover was also lost at this time at the latest. The book later appeared again in the possession of Swedish diplomat and civil servant Gustaf Celsing the Elder. At the death of his son, it was acquired by Uppsala University.

The manuscript is richly decorated with miniatures, including full-page depictions of the Four Evangelists, illuminated canon tables and a depiction of the emperor donating the book to the patron saints of Goslar Cathedral. It is written in Carolingian minuscule and is overall well-preserved.

== History ==
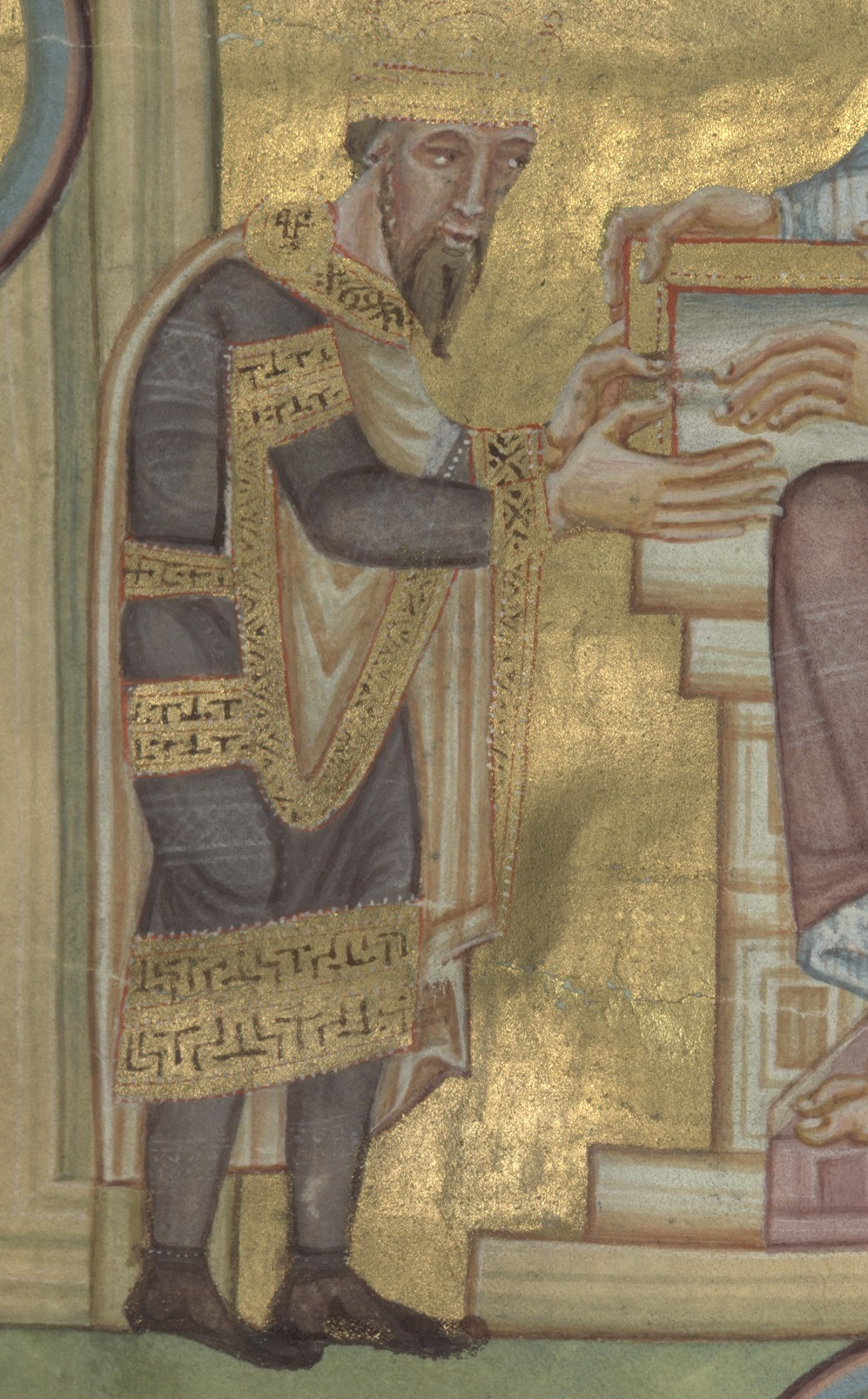
Detail from a miniature showing Henry III offering the book to Jude the Apostle and Simon the Zealot

The Emperor's Bible was commissioned by Henry III, Holy Roman Emperor and donated by him to Goslar Cathedral. The book contains a miniature depicting the coronation of Henry and his wife Agnes of Poitou, and another miniature shows the emperor presenting the book to the patron saints of the cathedral, Jude the Apostle and Simon the Zealot. This indicates that the book was donated to the church before the death of the emperor in 1056, but after the church was consecrated in 1051.

The book was made in the scriptorium of Echternach Abbey. The abbey had been producing illuminated manuscripts since the 8th century, but its production peaked at the time when the Emperor's Bible was made in the 11th century. It is one of four large gospel books made in Echternach which are still preserved, the others being the Codex Aureus of Echternach (today in the Germanisches Nationalmuseum in Nuremberg, Germany), the Golden Gospels of Henry III (today in El Escorial, Spain) and a third book which is only partially preserved (today in the Bibliothèque nationale de France in Paris, France). The Emperor's Bible is the youngest within this group. All are stylistically inspired by the Trier Gospels, made in Echternach sometime after 980.

The book remained the property of Goslar Cathedral until the Thirty Years' War. Swedish troops occupied the city of Goslar between 1632 and 1634, and during this time the book vanished. While many valuable books were taken by the Swedish army as loot during the war, it is less likely that the book was taken by Swedish troops since the Protestant city of Goslar was allied to the equally Protestant Swedes. The whereabouts of the book for approximately the next 100 years are unknown, but in 1740 it is known to have been in the possession of the Swedish civil servant and diplomat Gustaf Celsing the Elder, who was an avid book collector and who also wrote his name in the book. The book eventually passed to his son, Ulric Celsing and upon his death in 1805 it was bequeathed to Uppsala University, where it is still kept.

== Description ==
Despite its name, the Emperor's Bible is not a full Bible but a Gospel Book. It also contains Jerome's preface to the gospels, short prefaces ahead of each individual gospel, illuminated canon tables and pericopes, short texts used for specific festivals. All the text has been written by a single scribe in the script known as Carolingian minuscule. The book contains 159 folios or leaves, each measuring 38 centimetres (15 in) by 28 centimetres (11 in). The folios are made from high-quality vellum and the manuscript is generally very well preserved.

The book is profusely decorated. Each gospel text is preceded by a full-page miniature showing the respective Evangelist together with his symbol. There are in addition two other full-page miniatures. One depicts Christ in heaven, crowning Henry III and Empress Agnes. The other shows, as mentioned above, the emperor presenting the book to the patron saints of Goslar Cathedral. There are also a few purely decorative full-page illustrations, five decorative initials which also occupy entire pages, and the aforementioned canon tables which go on for a total of 12 full pages. In addition to this, there are also enlarged capitals within the text, decorated in gold and green.

The book is bound in sturdy oak covers. These were probably originally covered with gilded silver and semi-precious stones, but at some point—at the latest during the Thirty Years' War—the book was stripped of its valuable cover, and re-bound in blue velvet during the 17th century. The velvet has since been removed and is kept separately, together with silver clasps once used to keep the book tightly shut.

== Works cited ==
- Andersson-Schmitt, Margarete; Hedlund, Monica (1989). Mittelalterliche Handschriften der Universitätsbibliothek Uppsala: Katalog über die C- Sammlung (in German). Vol. 2. Stockholm: 1989. pp. 121–122. ISBN 9789155421502.
