= Johannes Colaert =

Dutch painter

Johannes Colaert (1620/22-1678) was a Dutch painter who lived in Amsterdam, and likely trained with Rembrandt. His work was executed in the style of the Amsterdam school of painters of historical topics, and was responsible, for example, for a set of paintings of the saints Boniface and Willibrord.
