= Dancing procession of Echternach =

Roman Catholic procession in Luxembourg

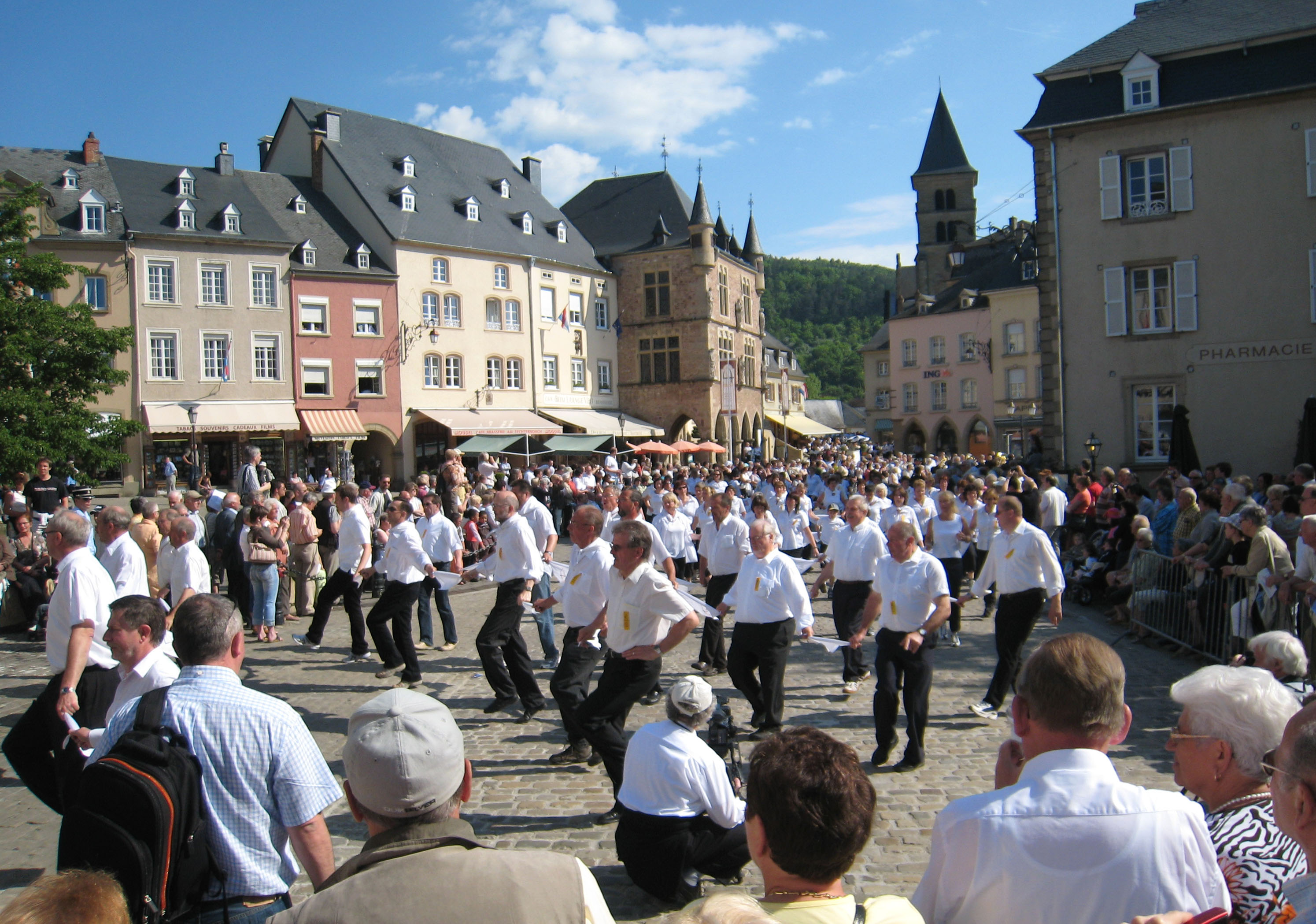
- Dancers in the procession, May 2008
- Date: Whit Tuesday
- Frequency: Annual
- Locations: Echternach, Luxembourg

Hopping procession of Echternach
- UNESCO Intangible Cultural Heritage
- Country: Luxembourg
- Reference: 00392
- Region: Europe and North America

Inscription history
- Inscription: 2010 (5th session)
- List: Representative

The hopping procession of Echternach (Iechternacher Sprangprëssioun) , also known as the dancing procession of Echternach, is an annual Roman Catholic procession held at Echternach, in eastern Luxembourg. Echternach's is the last traditional dancing procession in Europe.

The procession is held every Whit Tuesday. It honours Willibrord, the patron saint of Luxembourg, who established the Abbey of Echternach. Echternach has developed a strong tourism industry centred on the procession, which draws many thousands of tourists and pilgrims from around the world. The procession was inscribed in 2010 as "Hopping procession of Echternach" on the UNESCO Representative List of the Intangible Cultural Heritage of Humanity.

== Procession ==
The ritual begins in the morning at the bridge over the River Sauer, with a sermon delivered by the parish priest (formerly by the abbot of the monastery). “Willibrordus-Bauverein” officials organise the Procession, forming several dozen alternating groups of musicians and pilgrims. The group then moves through the streets of Echternach towards the basilica, a distance of about 1.5 kilometres (0.93 mi). Musicians play the Sprangprozessioùn, a centuries-old tune similar to an Irish jig or reel, based on the folk song "Adam had seven sons". Pilgrims in rows of four or five abreast hold the ends of white handkerchiefs, and "dance" or "jump" from left to right and thus slowly move forward.

The number of pilgrims attending causes it to be usually well after midday before the last of the dancers reach the church. A large number of priests, nuns, and monks accompany the procession, and frequently, there are several bishops as well. On arrival at the church, the dance is continued past the tomb of Saint Willibrord in the crypt beneath the high altar. Litanies and prayers in the Saint's honour are recited, and the event concludes with a Benediction of the Blessed Sacrament.

In the past, the dancing procession had other forms. At one point, the pilgrims would take three steps forward and two steps backwards, thus making five steps in order to advance one; another variation had the pilgrims repeatedly stop at the sound of a bell donated by Emperor Maximilian, falling to their knees before moving forward a few more steps. Again, pilgrims would crawl under a stone, facing the Cross of Saint Willibrord. A “cattle-bell dance” used to take place in front of the Cross, which stood in the marketplace; this was ended in 1664.

== History ==
The Abbey of Echternach was a major Christian centre in the Middle Ages, and maintained a famous library and scriptorium. However, it owes its modern fame to the dancing procession. This aspect of the cultus of Saint Willibrord may be traced back almost to his death; among the stream of pilgrims to his tomb in the abbey church have been Emperors Charlemagne, Lothair I, Conrad, and later Maximilian (in 1512).

There might be pagan elements, such as the ones that were criticised by Saint Eligius in the 7th century. Documents of the fifteenth century already speak of it as a long-established custom, and that a similar "dancing" procession used to take place in the small town of Prüm, in the Eifel as early as 1342. Legends are told that relate the dancing procession to an averted plague or offer a fable about an unjustly condemned fiddler, who, allowed to play his fiddle one last time, caused the townspeople to dance. He made his escape, while they continued to dance until Willibrord arrived to break the charm. The story dates back to the eighth century.

The first written reference of the hopping saints goes back to 1497, but the origins must be from much earlier.

The procession took place annually without interruption until 1777. There was an uneasy relationship with Church hierarchy, for the music and dancing were forbidden by Archbishop Wenceslas, who declared that there should only be a pilgrim's procession, and in 1786, Emperor Joseph II banned the procession altogether. Attempts were made to revive it ten years later, and, although the French Revolution effectually prevented it, it was revived in 1802, and has continued ever since.

In 1826, the government tried to change the day to a Sunday. Since 1830, it has always taken place on Whit Tuesday, selected for reasons of tradition with no direct relation to Saint Willibrord himself, whose own feast day in the General Roman Calendar is 7 November.

In bygone days the procession was a genuine pilgrimage. The dancing procession to the saint's tomb can be seen as an expression of joy or a form of prayer which involves body and spirit. It is an annual ceremony done as an act of penance and especially in order to avert epilepsy, Saint Vitus Dance, or convulsions.
