= Willibrord Society =

The Willibrord Society is an umbrella term for a group of national societies with the aim of promoting awareness and cooperation between Anglicans and Old Catholics. There are currently active Willibrord societies in the British Isles, the Netherlands, Germany, Switzerland, Austria, Italy, the Czech Republic and the United States. The aim is achieved through publications, meetings, special events and church services, and common projects in such fields as liturgy, youth work, charity giving, encouraging representation at synods and other events. The SSW in the British Isles currently supports the Anglican chaplaincy at Schiphol Airport in the Netherlands, in which Old Catholics are also involved.

The name recalls St. Willibrord, the Anglo-Saxon missionary who acted as "Apostle to the Frisians" and was consecrated the first Bishop of Utrecht in 695. Most national societies organize special events and services to coincide with St. Willibrord's Day, 7 November.

== History ==
The English society of St Willibrord was founded in 1908 with the aim of fostering closer relations between the Church of England and the Old Catholic churches. Its activities were at first aimed at promoting full communion between the two churches, which came about in the Bonn Agreement of 1931. In 2009, it was decided to also include the Celtic churches; the Scottish Episcopal Church, the Church of Ireland and the Church in Wales. It is now the Society of St Willibrord in Britain and Ireland.

It has as its patrons the Archbishop of Canterbury and the Archbishop of Utrecht (of the Old Catholic Church of the Netherlands). The Bishop of Cashel and Ossory is its chairman.
