= Abbey of Echternach =

Benedictine monastery in Echternach, Luxembourg

Coordinates: 49°48′50″N 06°25′21″E

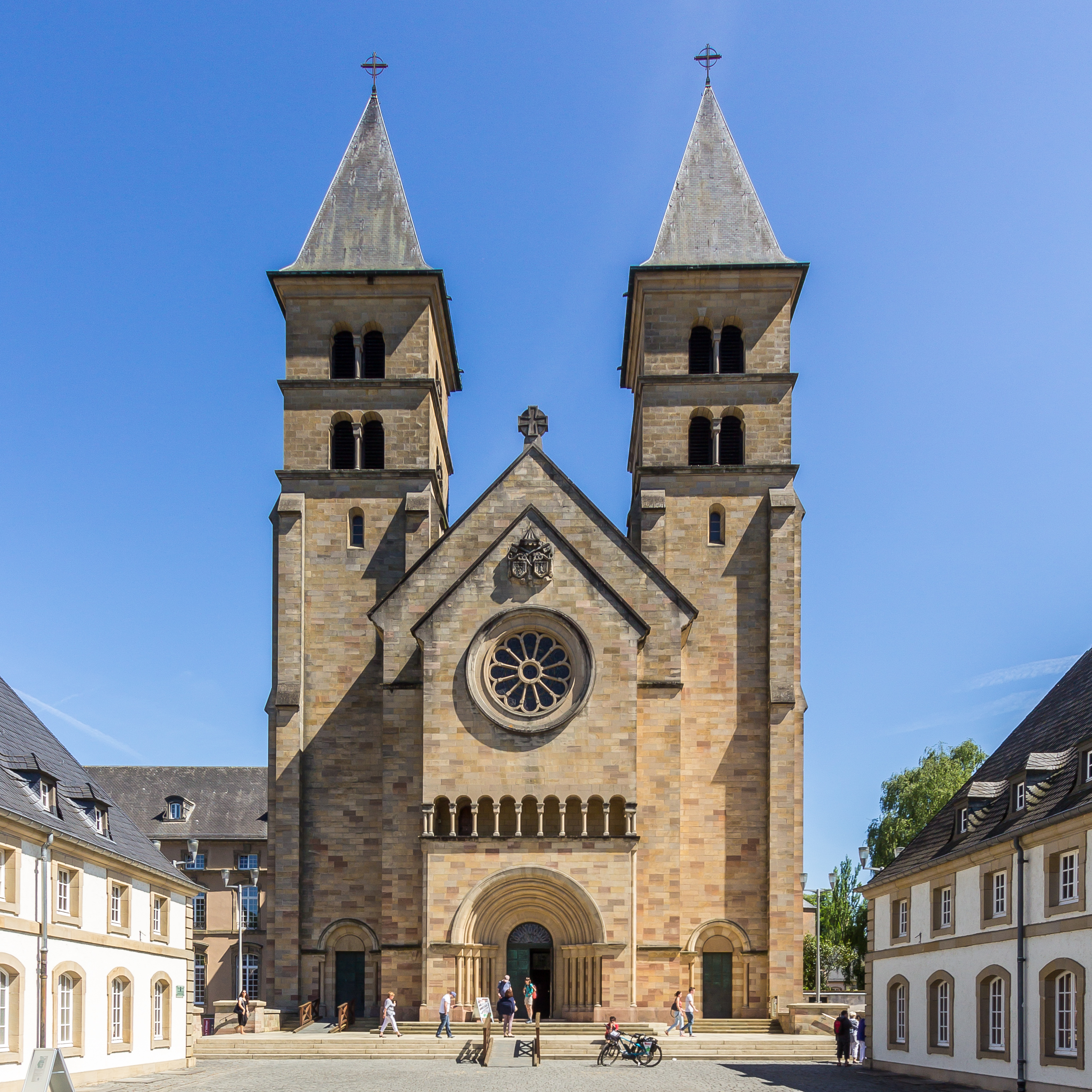
The facade of the Abbey of Echternach

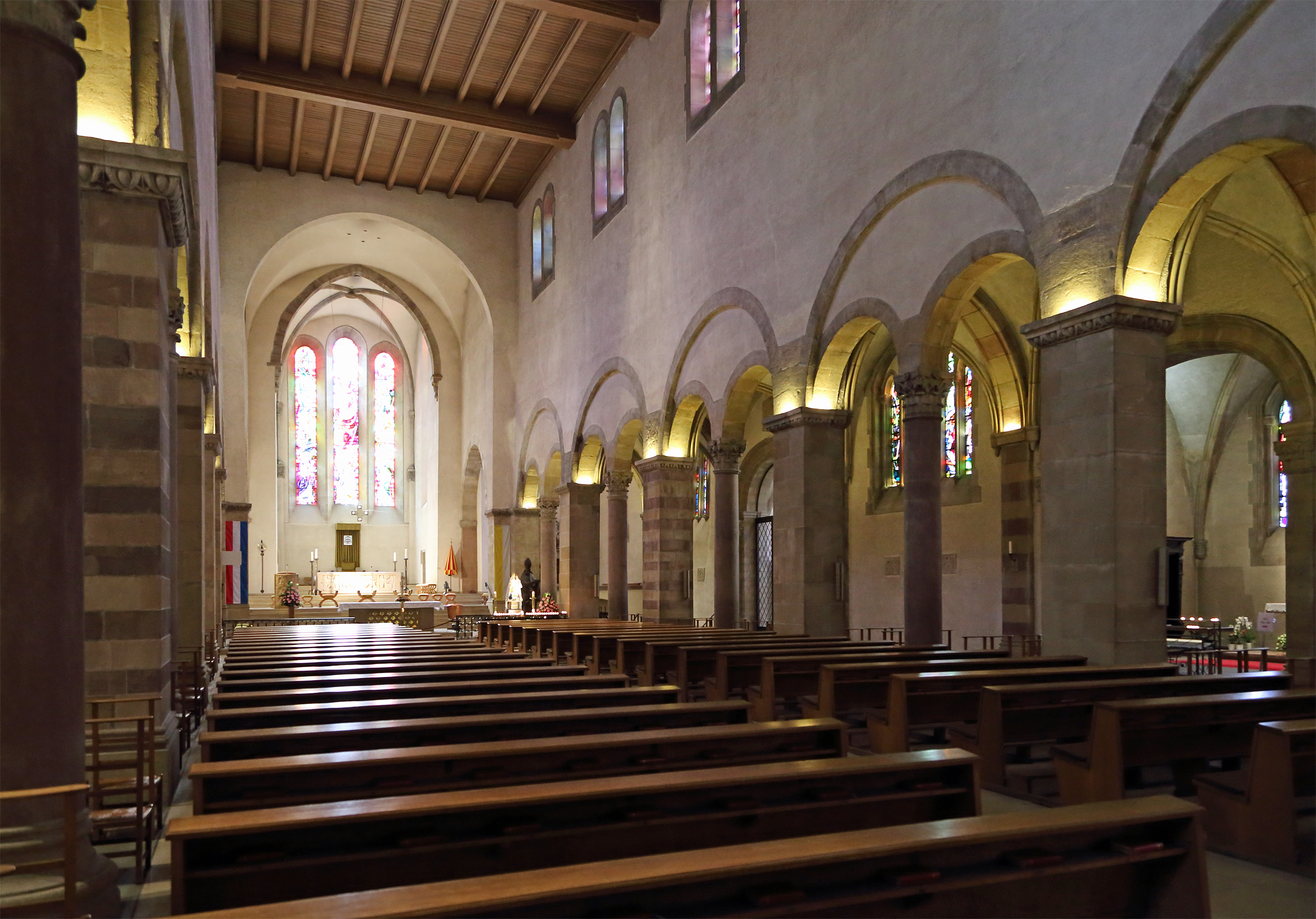
Inside the St Willibrord basilica

The Abbey of Echternach is a Benedictine monastery in the town of Echternach, in eastern Luxembourg. The abbey was founded in the 7th century by St Willibrord, the patron saint of Luxembourg. For three hundred years, it benefited from the patronage of a succession of rulers, and was the most powerful institution in Luxembourg.

The abbey is currently a popular tourist attraction mostly on account of an annual dancing procession that is held every Whit Tuesday. Tens of thousands of tourists, day-trippers, pilgrims, and clergy visit Echternach to witness or participate in the traditional ceremony.

== History ==
=== Willibrord ===
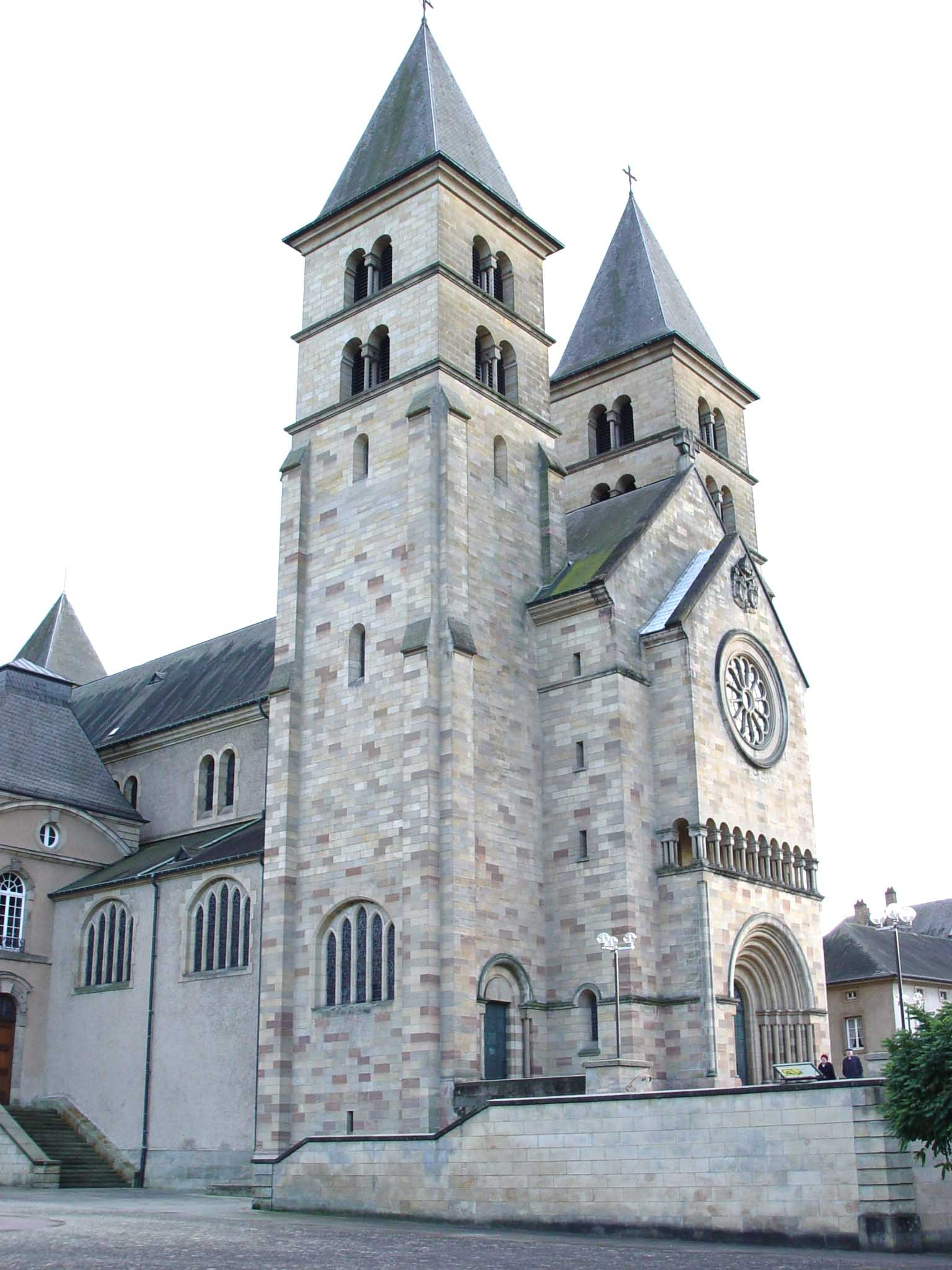
The modern basilica in Echternach.

Located by the River Sauer, Echternach had originally been the site of a 1st-century Roman villa. By the 6th century, the estate had been passed to the see of Trier, who constructed a small monastery on the estate. In 698, Irmina of Oeren granted the Northumbrian missionary Willibrord, Bishop of Utrecht, land at Echternach to build a larger monastery, appointing Willibrord as abbot. In part, the choice was due to Willibrord's reputation as a talented proselytiser (he is known as the Apostle to the Frisians).

Willibrord opened the first church at Echternach in 700 with financial backing from Pepin of Herstal. Pepin's son, Charles Martel, founder of the Carolingian dynasty, had his son Pepin the Short baptised at Echternach in 714. In addition to Carolingian support, Willibrord's abbey at Echternach had the backing of Wilfrid, with whom he had served at Ripon. Willibrord secured the backing of many Irish monks, who would become part of the first settlement at Echternach.

Willibrord spent much time at Echternach, and died there in 739. Willibrord was buried in the oratory, which soon became a place of pilgrimage, particularly after he was canonised. In 751, Pepin declared the Abbey of Echternach a 'royal abbey', and granted it immunity. It became later an Imperial Abbey.

=== Carolingian Renaissance ===
Beornrad, the third abbot of Echternach, was a great favourite of Charlemagne, and was promoted to Archbishop of Sens in 785. When Beornrad died, in 797, Charlemagne took direct control of the abbey for a year.

The work of the monks at the abbey was heavily influenced by Willibrord's roots in Northumbria and Ireland, where a great emphasis was put on codices, and Echternach developed one of the most important scriptoria in the Frankish Empire. The abbey at Echternach produced four gospels (in order of production): the Augsburg Gospels, Maaseyck Gospels, Trier Gospels, and the Freiburg Gospel Book Fragment.

Manuscripts produced at Echternach are known to have been in both insular and Roman half uncial script. As Echternach was so prolific, and enjoyed the patronage of Pepin the Short and Charlemagne, it played a crucial role in the development of the early Carolingian Renaissance. Seeing the work of the abbey at Echternach at taming the native German script, and eager to further the reform, Charlemagne sent for Alcuin, to establish a scriptorium at the court in Aachen. Alcuin synthesised the two styles into the standard Carolingian minuscule, which predominated for the next four centuries.

At the start of the ninth century, a larger, Carolingian-style church was constructed, but it was destroyed in a fire some 200 years later. The abbey, as it enjoyed power, both spiritual and temporal. However, this was all guaranteed only by the Carolingians. When the authority of the centralised Frankish state collapsed during the civil wars under Louis the Pious, so too did the power of the abbey. In 847, the Benedictine monks were ejected and replaced by lay-abbots.

=== Return of the Benedictine monks ===
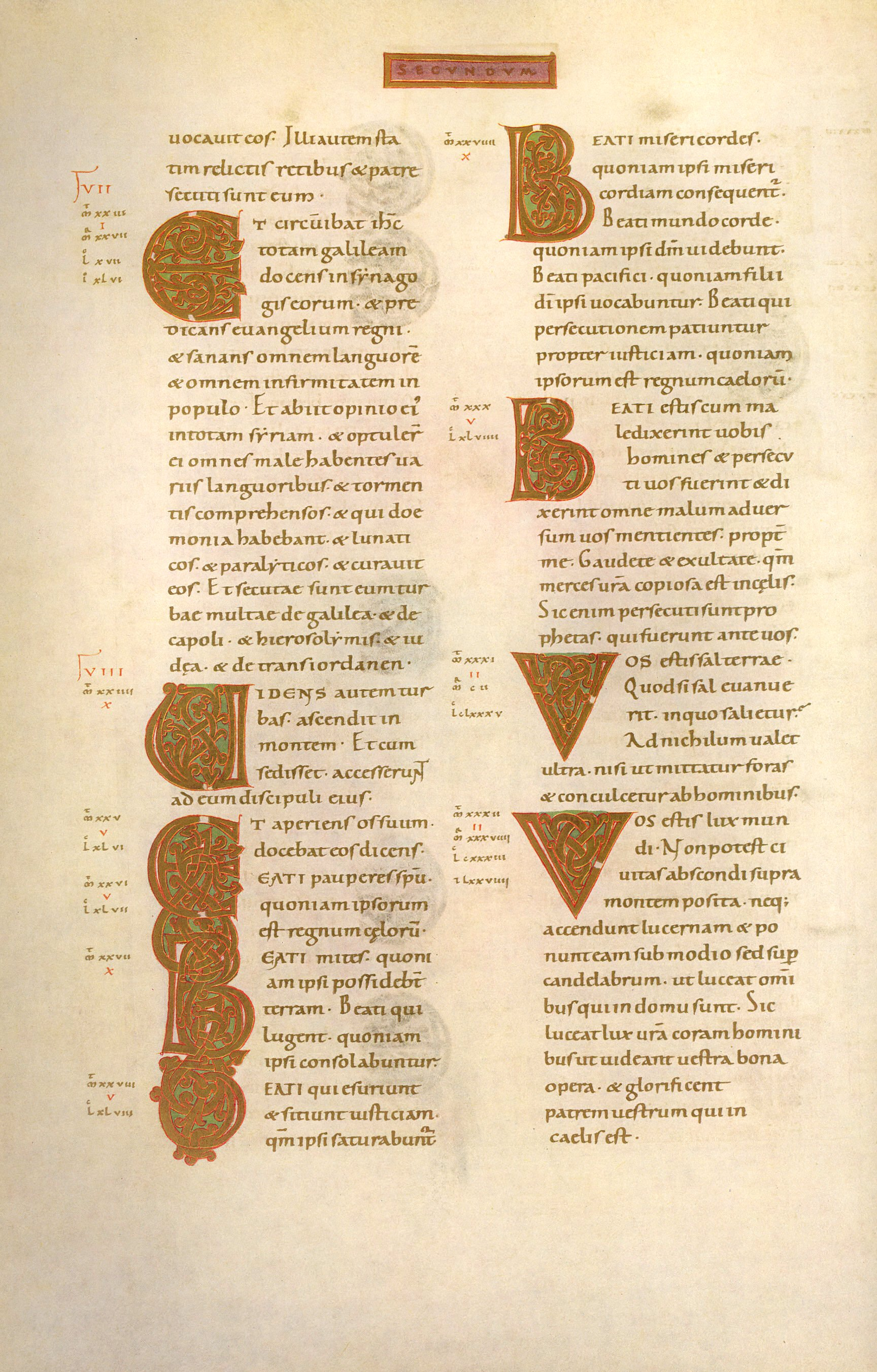
Text page from the Codex Aureus of Echternach

The fortunes of the abbey continued to vary with the fortunes of the Holy Roman Empire. When Otto the Great reunited the Empire, he sought to rejuvenate the intellectual and religious life of his dominions, including Echternach. In 971, he restored the Benedictines to Echternach with forty monks of that order from Trier. The abbey entered a second Golden Age, as it once again became one of northern Europe's most influential abbeys. In 1031, a new Romanesque church was consecrated.

The Codex Aureus of Echternach, an important surviving codex written entirely in gold ink was produced here in the 11th century. The so-called Emperor's Bible and the Golden Gospels of Henry III were also produced in Echternach at this time, when production of books at the scriptorium peaked.

=== The modern abbey ===
Around the middle of the 19th century, the choir began to crumble and it was feared that it might collapse completely. For this reason, an association was founded in 1862 for the reconstruction of the church (the Kirchbauverein). The rebuilding in a neo-roman style was completed in 1868, and the abbey was re-consecrated.

In recognition of its importance as a national centre of pilgrimage to St. Willibrord, Pope Pius XII granted the abbey the status of minor basilica in 1939.

Part of the basilica was blasted by retreating German Wehrmacht troops on December 26th 1944, necessitating another reconstruction - its sixth in 14 centuries - in the original Roman style. The facade is a nod to the basilica of Paray-le-Monial. The building was again re-consecrated in 1953, though the 8th-century crypt has survived throughout with no major damage.

== Chronology of churches ==
There have been six churches built on the site at Echternach:

- Unknown - 700: Original pre-abbey church
- 700 - c. 800: Merovingian church
- c. 800 - 1016: Carolingian church
- 1031 - 1797: Original Romanesque basilica
- 1862 - 1944: Reconstructed basilica
- 1953–present day: Modern basilica

== Dancing procession ==
Despite the long history of the abbey and the city, Echternach is best known today for its traditional dancing procession, held around the town of Echternach. It is held every Whit Tuesday in honour of Saint Willibrord, and is the last such traditional dancing procession in Europe. The event draws to Echternach tens of thousands of visitors a year, be they pilgrims or tourists, who either participate or observe the quaint and distinctive procession.

== Library ==
On 9 February 2010 Otto Harrassowitz Verlag, Wiesbaden, published a two-volume catalogue of the manuscripts in the library on behalf of the Bibliothèque nationale de Luxembourg.

== List of abbots ==
- Willibrord (698–739)
- Adalbert (739–775)
- Beornrad (775–797)
- Hetti (before 838 – 27 May 847)
- Reginar (864–870), lay abbot
- Adalhard I (bis 870), lay abbot
- Karlmann (874–876)
- Adalhard II (until 890), lay abbot
- Hermann I (926–949), lay abbot
- Siegfried I (c. 950), lay abbot
- Ravanger (973–1007)
- Urold (1007–1027)
- Humbert (1028–1051)
- Reginbert (1051–1081)
- Thiofrid (1081–1110)
- Godfried I (1122–1155)
- Ludwig (1173–1181)
- Godfried II (1181–1210)
- Bartholomäus von Esch (1210–1231)
- Richard I (1270–1296 or 1280–1297)
- Heinrich von Schönecken (1298–1324)
- Theoderich von Are (1329–1341)
- Johannes [John I] von Winningen (1341–1353)
- Jean [John II] de Neuville (1353–1357)
- Wilhelm von Kerpen (1358–1374)
- Hertwin von Waldeck (1375–1377)
- Philipp von Homburg (1377–1378)
- Wirich von Adenbach (1378–1400)
- Peter I Beissel von Gymnich (1400–1412)
- Nikolaus von Gymnich (1412–1418)
- Pierre [Peter II] de Hubines (1418–1438)
- Winand von Gluwel (1438–1465)
- Colin Plick von Oirwick (1465–1476)
- Francis Plick von Oirwick (1476–1477)
- Burchard Poszwin von Neuerburg (1490–1506)
- Robert von Monreal (1506–1539)
- Matthias von Lutzerath (1539)
- Godfried III von Aspremont (1540–1562)
- Antonius Hovaeus Haecmundanus (1563 – 8 October 1568)
- Martin Maas (1569–1585)
- Jean [John III] Glatz (1586–1594)
- Johannes [John IV] Bertelius (1595 – 19 June 1607)
- Pierre [Peter III] Richardot (1607–1628)
- Peter IV Fisch von Rosport (1628 – 15 March 1657)
- Richard II Paschasius (1657–1667)
- Philippe de la Neufforge (1667 – 10 September 1684)
- Willibrord Hotton (1684–1693)
- Benoît Zender (1694–1717)
- Matthias Hartz (1717–1728)
- Grégoire Schouppe (1728 – 19 July 1751)
- Michael Hormann (1751–1775)
- Emmanuel Limpach (1775 – 6 September 1793)

== Burials ==
- Saint Willibrord
- Henry IV, Count of Luxembourg

== See also ==
- List of Carolingian monasteries
- Giant Bible of Echternach
- Codex Aureus of Echternach
- Echternach Gospels
