= Bonn Agreement (Christianity) =

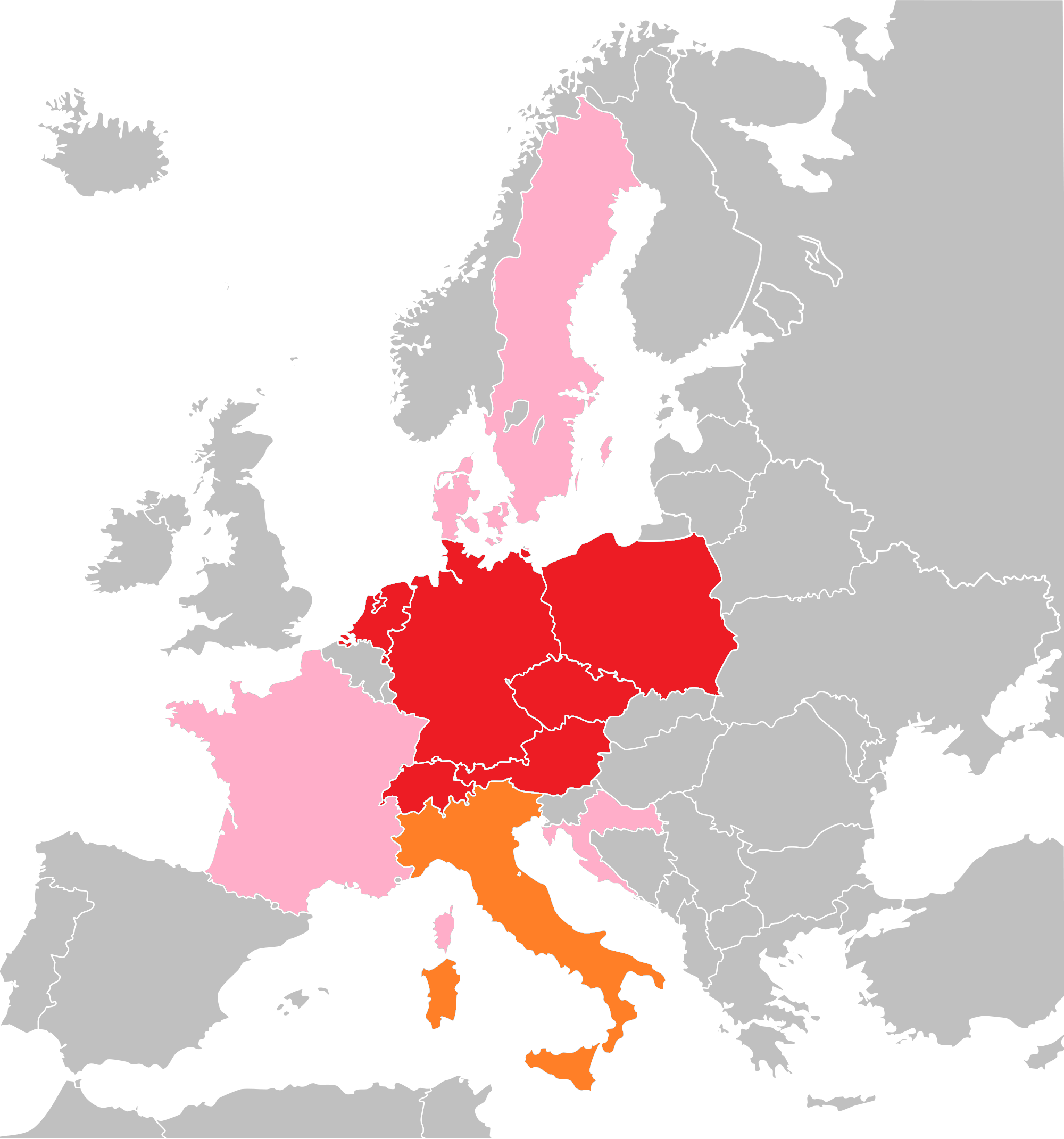
Red areas - full members of the Union of Utrecht Pink areas - dependent jurisdictions Orange - former dependent jurisdictions

The Bonn Agreement of July 2, 1931 is a formal affirmation which established full communion between the Church of England and the Old Catholic churches of the Union of Utrecht, including the Old Catholic Church of the Netherlands. While it allowed bilateral participation in sacraments, it does not require from either the acceptance of all doctrinal opinions. This communion has since been extended to all churches of the Anglican Communion through their synods.

== Principles ==
The agreement expresses three principles:

1. Each communion recognizes the catholicity and independence of the other and maintains its own.
2. Each communion agrees to admit members of the other communion to participate in the sacraments.
3. Full communion does not require from either communion the acceptance of all doctrinal opinion, sacramental devotion or liturgical practice characteristic of the other, but implies that each believes the other to hold all the essentials of the Christian faith.

To monitor the progressive growing together of the two communions, the Anglican-Old Catholic International Co-ordinating Council was established by the International Bishops' Conference and the Lambeth Conference. Its first official meeting took place in 1999.

== See also ==
- Willibrord Society

== Bibliography ==
- Bonn Agreement. Historical Dictionary of Anglicanism: Historical Dictionaries of Religions, Philosophies, and Movements Series. Author: Colin Buchanan. Edition: 2. Publisher: Rowman & Littlefield, 2015. Pages 105-106. ISBN 9781442250161.
- Caruso, Robert W. Celebrating Communion: An Old Catholic and Episcopal Paradigm of the Local Church in North America. 2012. OCLC 883756408
- Commission of the Anglican Communion and the Old Catholic Churches. Report of the Meeting of the Commission of the Anglican Communion and the Old Catholic Churches Held at Bonn on Thursday, July 2, 1931. London: Society for Promoting Christian Knowledge, 1931. OCLC 10454735
- Emhardt, William Chauncey. Old Catholics Are Essential to Reunion. New York, N.Y.: National Council, Protestant Episcopal Church, 1931. OCLC 39696791
- Emhardt, William Chauncey. Thoughts on the Anglican Communion and Reunion: Four Articles. New York: National Council [of the] Protestant Episcopal Church, 1930. Contents: I. Strides toward reunion at Lambeth.--Old Catholics are essential to reunion.--III. The nature of the Anglican Communion.--IV. The enlarging horizon of our Communion. OCLC 2194509
- Gauthier, L. Pour le 25e anniversaire de l'intercommunion anglicane et vieille-catholique. [Place of publication not identified]: [publisher not identified], 1956. http://www.worldcat.org/oclc/60492752
- Huelin, Gordon. Old Catholics and Anglicans, 1931-1981. Oxford University Press, 1983. "To commemorate the fiftieth anniversary of intercommunion." OCLC 10532842
- Richard J. Mammana Jr. (editor), Intercommunion between the Episcopal Church and the Polish National Catholic Church: An Introduction and Sourcebook (Resica Falls: Project Canterbury, 2022) ISBN 9798402891548
- Maan, P. J., and J. Visser. 1931-1981: vijftig jaren full communion tussen de Anglikaanse en Oud-Katholieke Kerken. Amersfoort: Oud-Katholiek Seminarie, 1982. OCLC 60661010
- Neuhoff, Klaus Heinrich. Building on the Bonn Agreement: An Historical Study of Anglican-Old Catholic Relations Before and After the 1931 Bonn Agreement with Special Reference to the Anglican-Old Catholic Theologians' Conferences 1957-2005. Amersfoort: Stichting Oud-Katholiek Seminarie, 2010. Contents: Introduction—History of the Bonn Agreement—Text and ratification of the Bonn Agreement --'Pre-history': the Church of England and the See of Utrecht—Since Vatican I : the establishment of further Old Catholic Churches—The Bonn Agreement (1931) --Problems relating to the Bonn Agreement—Anglican-Old Catholic theologians' conferences—Introduction—Overlapping jurisdictions—Ecumenical dialogues—Full doctrinal agreement? Orthodox churches—Universal jurisdiction iure divino? Roman Catholic Church—Eucharistic hospitality? Protestant churches—Ordination of women—Considerations for today. OCLC 695036294
- Rein, Harald. Kirchengemeinschaft: die anglikanisch-altkatholisch-orthodoxen Beziehungen von 1870 bis 1990 und ihre ökumenische Relevanz. Bern: P. Lang, 1993. Bd. 1. Allgemeine Einführung: die anglikanisch-altkatholischen Beziehungen.-- Bd. 2. Die anglikanisch-orthodoxen Beziehungen, Die orthodox-altkatholischen Beziehungen, Das ekklesiologische Selbstverstä̇ndnis und die Beziehungen dieser drei zu anderen Kirchen. OCLC 28463746
- Reunion Conference, and F. H. Reusch. Bericht über die am 14., 15. und 16. September zu Bonn gehaltenen Unions-Conferenzen, im Auftrage des Vorsitzenden Dr. von Döllinger. Bonn: P. Neusser, 1874. OCLC 31336990
- Rodzina tygodnik katolicki: numer specialny : nr 44 (1106). Warszawa: [publisher not identified], 1981. OCLC 14393699.
