= Whit Tuesday =

Christian holiday

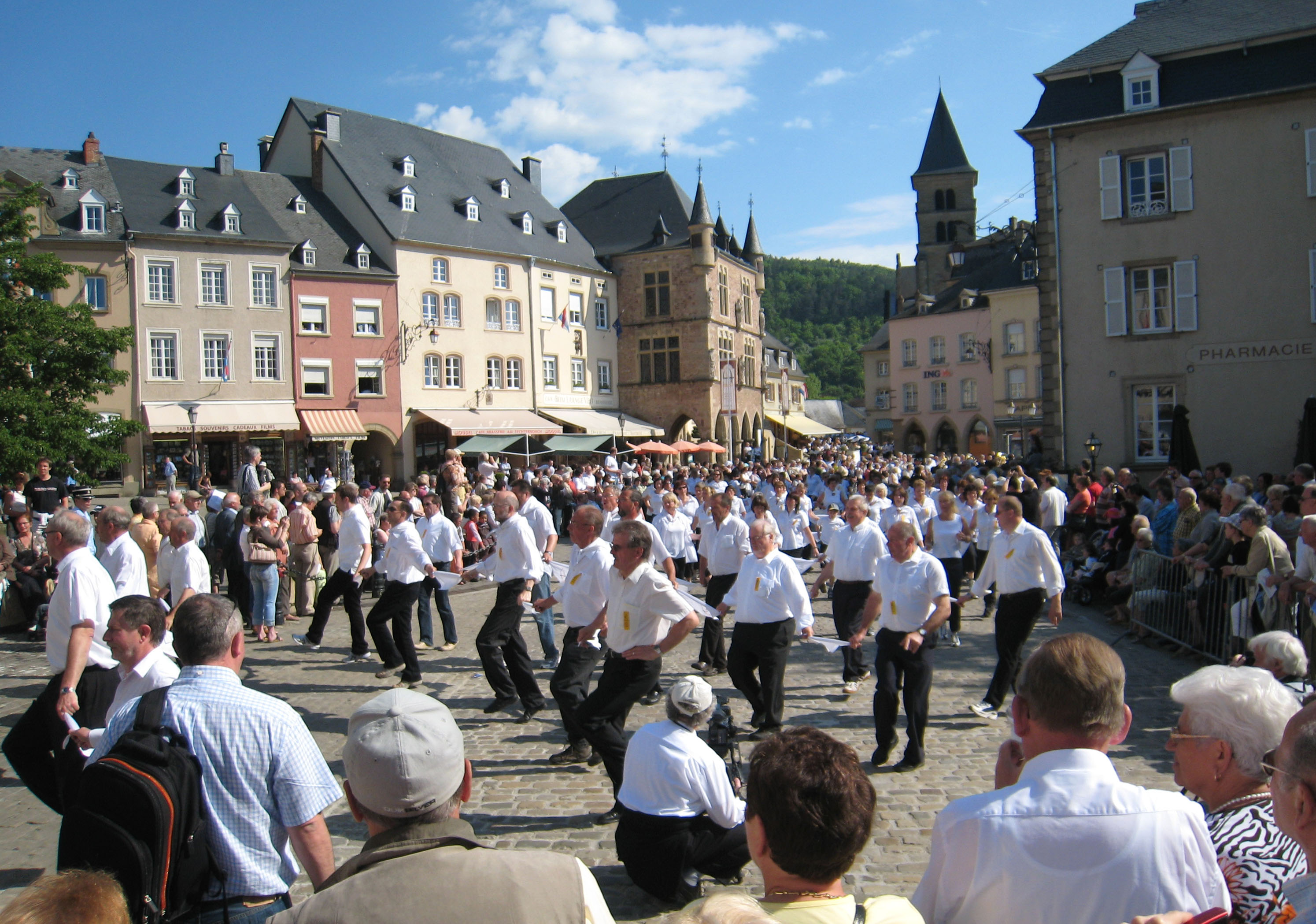
- The dancing procession of Echternach which takes place annually on Whit Tuesday in Echternach, Luxembourg.
- Also called: Pentecost Tuesday (Western), Third Day of the Trinity (Eastern)
- Observed by: Many European countries and some former colonies
- Type: Christian, Public
- Begins: 1st Tuesday After Whit Sunday
- Date: Easter + 51 days
- 2025 date: June 10 (Western); June 10 (Eastern)
- 2026 date: May 26 (Western); June 2 (Eastern)
- 2027 date: May 18 (Western); June 22 (Eastern)
- 2028 date: June 6 (Western); June 6 (Eastern)
- Frequency: annual
- Related to: Whit Sunday, Whit Monday, Whit Friday, Trinity Sunday

Whit Tuesday (syn. Whittuesday, Whitsun Tuesday) is the Christian holiday celebrated the day after Pentecost Monday, the third day of the week beginning on Pentecost. Pentecost is a movable feast in the Christian calendar dependent upon the date of Easter. "Whit" relates either to the white robes worn by those baptized on Pentecost, or to the French word "huit," since Pentecost is the eighth Sunday after Easter.

== Observance ==
It was a holiday in the Lutheran Church in Germany at Bach's time, where all major holidays were celebrated for three days. Bach and others composed cantata music for the occasion.

It used to be a public holiday in Denmark and Sweden. In Denmark it was abolished on 26 October 1770, and in Sweden on 4 November 1772, both places as part of larger reductions of the number of holidays.

The Dancing procession of Echternach takes place on Pentecost Tuesday. In the 19th century, it was also the occasion of the feast of Saint Tetha in Cornwall.

=== Observance in Eastern Orthodoxy ===
In the Eastern Orthodox Church, Whit Tuesday is known as the "Third Day of the Trinity" and is part of the Feast of Pentecost. Monasteries, cathedrals, and parish churches often celebrate the Divine Liturgy on this day.

== See also ==
- Ordinary Time
- Willibrord
