= Golden Gospels of Henry III =

Illuminated Gospel Book

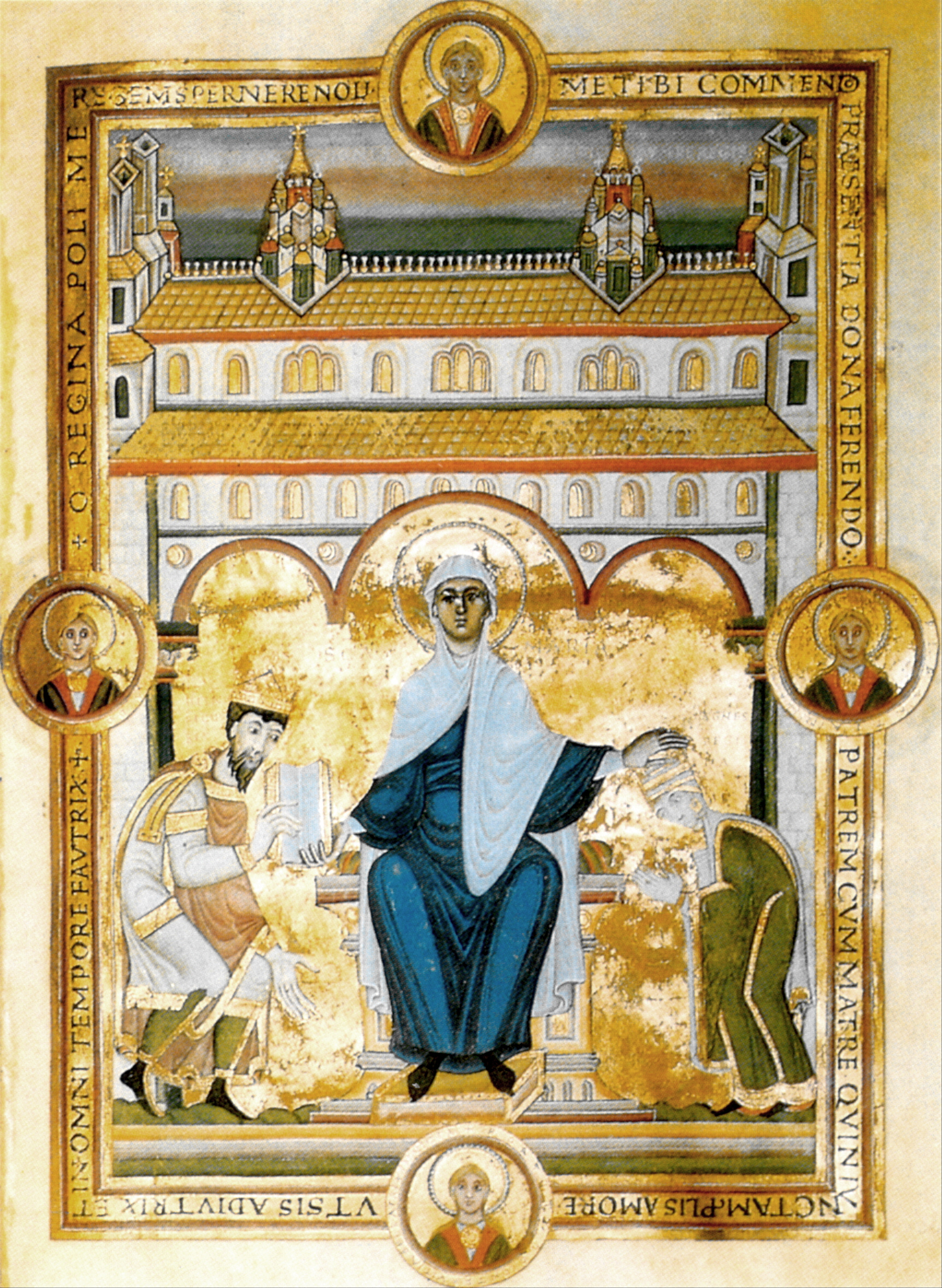
Folio 3 recto from the Golden Gospels of Henry III, The Virgin Mary blessing Henry III, Holy Roman Emperor and his consort, Agnes. In the background is Speyer Cathedral in Germany.

The Golden Gospels of Henry III, also Codex Aureus of Speyer or Speyer Gospels (Speyerer Evangeliar), (El Escorial, Real Biblioteca, Cod. Vitrinas 17) is an eleventh-century illuminated Gospel Book. The manuscript contains the Vulgate versions of the four gospels plus prefatory matter including the Eusebian canon tables. It was probably produced at the Abbey of Echternach under the patronage of Henry III, Holy Roman Emperor. In 1046, Henry donated the manuscript to Speyer Cathedral in Germany to commemorate the dedication of the cathedral's high altar.

The manuscript has 171 folios which measure 500 mm (20 in) by 335 mm (13.2 in) and is lavishly illuminated. It contains 13 full page miniatures, and 43 half-page miniatures, 12 decorated pages of canon tables, and over 40 other decorated pages half-page initials.

The manuscript was later owned by Maximilian I. It was later located in the Netherlands, where it was owned by Maximilian's daughter Margaret and granddaughter Mary. While in the Netherlands, the manuscript was used by Erasmus. It was subsequently acquired by Philip II, King of Spain, who donated it to the monastery at El Escorial in Spain.

Stylistically, it is related to the so-called Emperor's Bible, presently in Uppsala University Library, Sweden.

== See also ==
- Codex Aureus (disambiguation)
