= Beornrad (archbishop of Sens) =

Beornrad (also spelled Beornred; died 797) was Archbishop of Sens from 785/6 until his death. He was Alcuin's cousin and was also related to Willibrord by blood.

Beornrad had moved from Northumbria to the European mainland at an unknown date, and was appointed as the third abbot of Echternach in 775, succeeding Albert to the post. According to a letter-poem written by Alcuin, Beornrad had become part of the court of Charlemagne by the 770s. Though Beornrad was later appointed Archbishop of Sens, he retained the abbacy of Echternach until his death.

He was succeeded in his bishopric by Ragembert and in his abbacy by Ado. Beornrad was buried in the Abbey of Saint-Pierre-le-Vif in Sens.

== Sources ==
- Costambeys, Marios (2004). "Beornred". Oxford Dictionary of National Biography (online ed.). Oxford University Press. doi:10.1093/ref:odnb/60150. (Subscription or UK public library membership required.)
- Mayr-Harting, Henry (2016). "Alcuin, Charlemagne and the problem of sanctions". In Baxter, Stephen; Karkov, Catherine; Nelson, Janet L.; Pelteret, David (eds.). Early Medieval Studies in Memory of Patrick Wormald. Routledge. ISBN 978-0754663317.
- Stenton, F.M. (2001). Anglo-Saxon England (3 ed.). Oxford University Press. ISBN 978-0192801395.
