= Echternach Gospels =

7th-century illuminated manuscript Gospel book

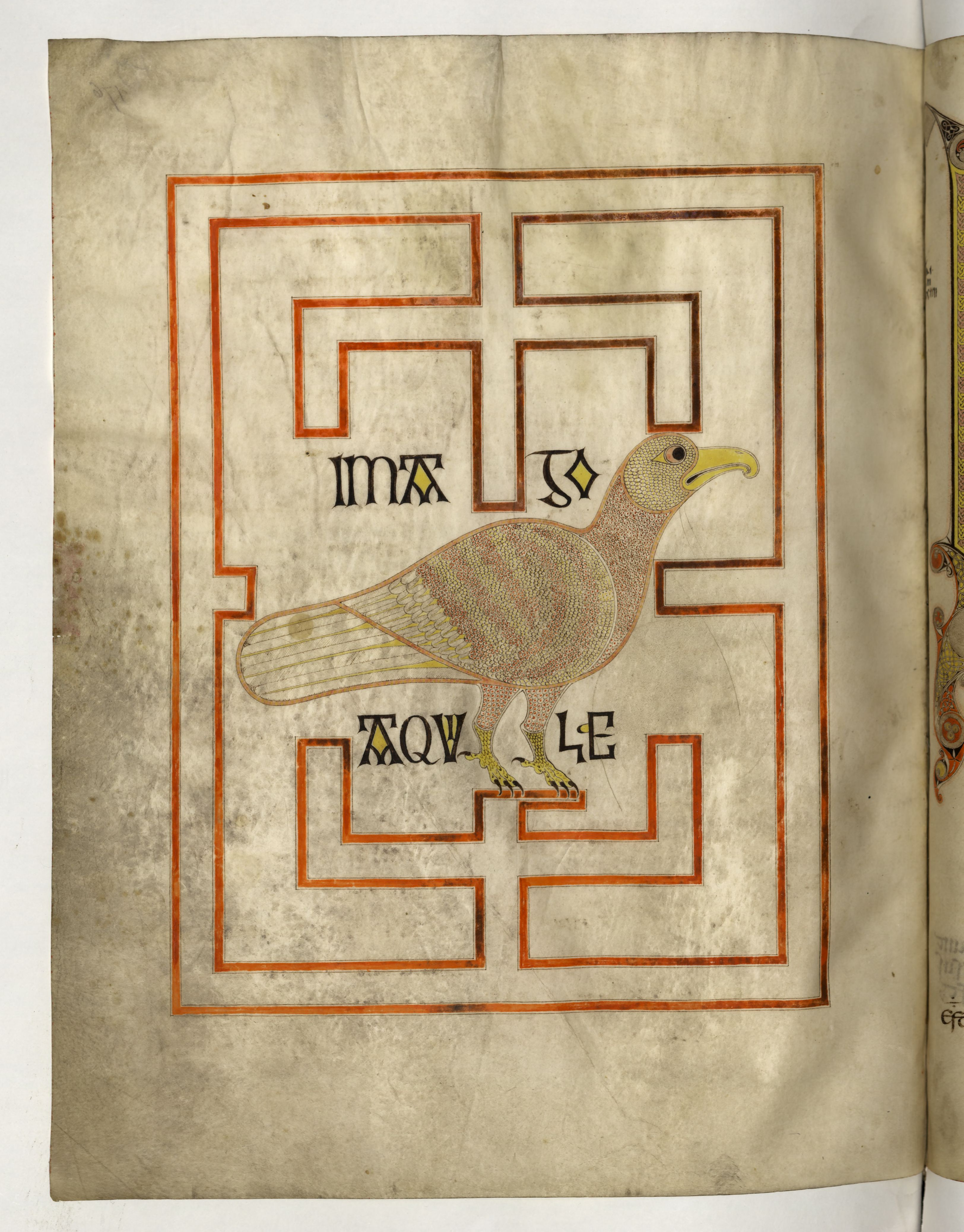
The Eagle, symbol of St John from the Echternach Gospels

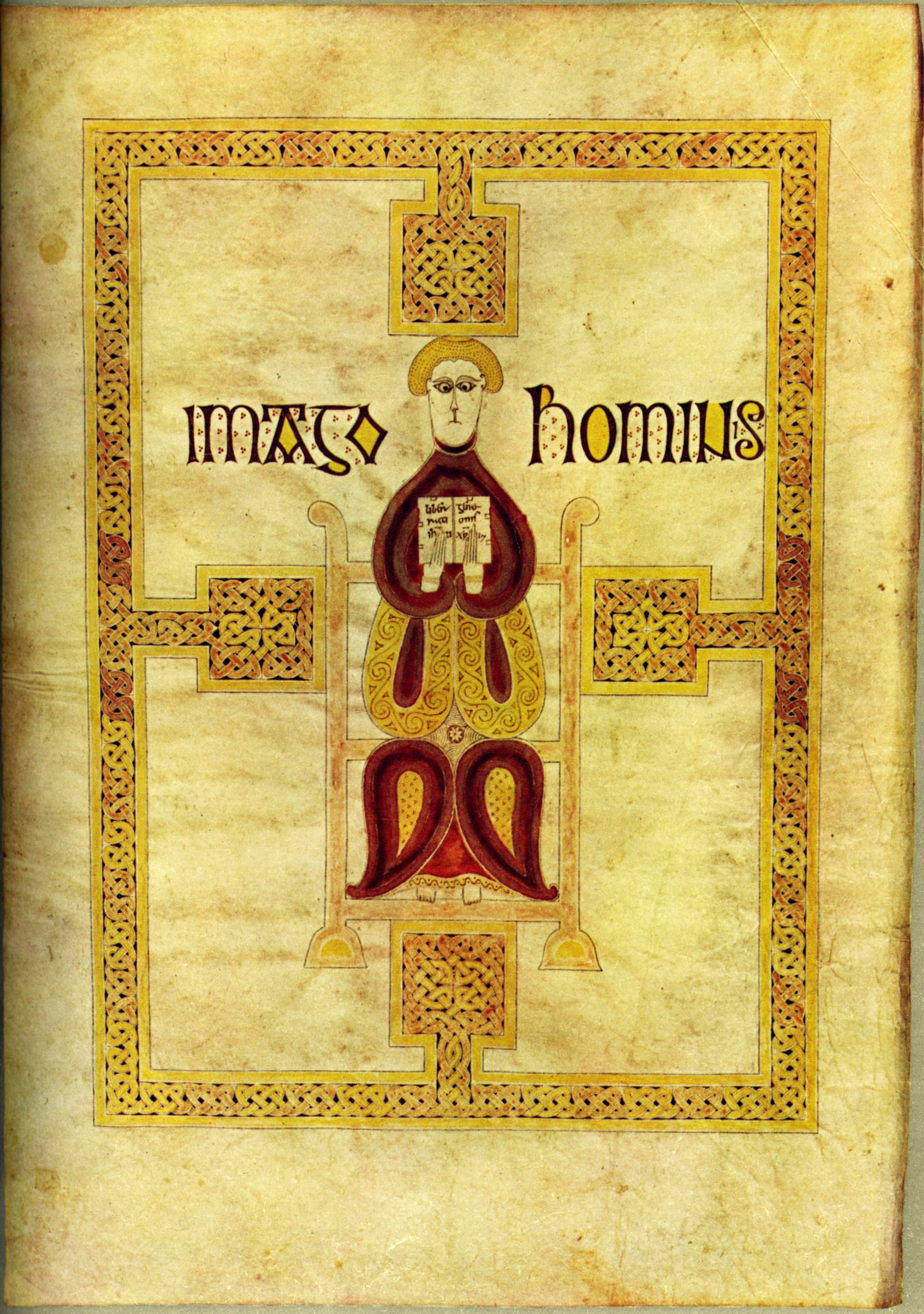
The Man, symbol of St Matthew

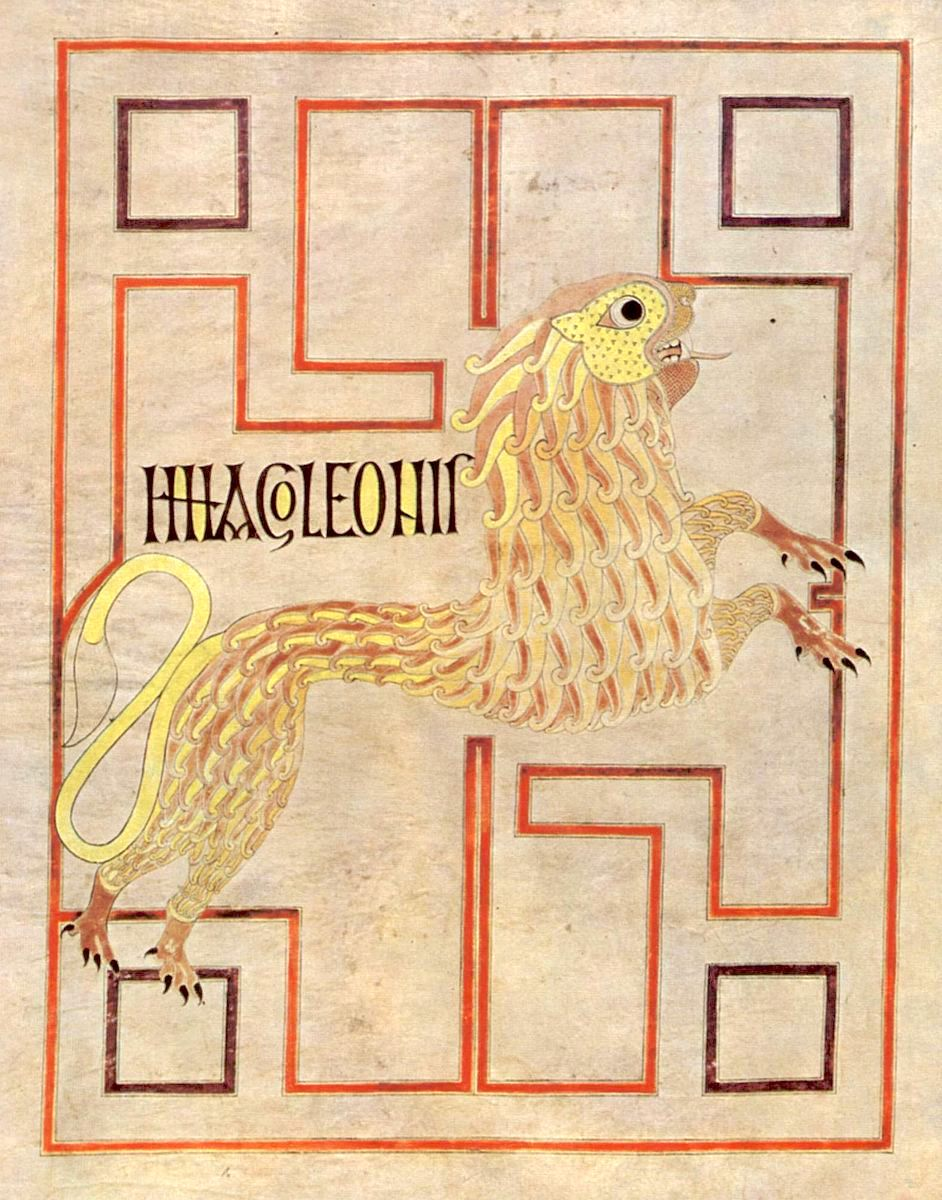
The lion symbol of St Mark from the Echternach Gospels.

The Echternach Gospels (Paris, Bib. N., MS. lat. 9389) were produced, presumably, at Lindisfarne Abbey in Northumbria around the year 690. This location was very significant for the production of Insular manuscripts, such as the Durham Gospels (ms. A.II.17) and the Lindisfarne Gospels (ms. Cotton Nero D. IV). The scribe of the Durham Gospels is believed to have created the Echternach Gospels as well. The Echternach Gospels are now in the collection of France's Bibliothèque Nationale in Paris.

This manuscript, and other such Hiberno-Saxon codices, were highly important instructional devices used in the Early Middle Ages primarily for conversion. The Echternach Gospels were probably taken by Willibrord, a Northumbrian missionary, to his newly founded Abbey of Echternach, now in Luxembourg, from which they are named. It is significant that this early Hiberno-Saxon manuscript should have been brought here because, with Willibrord as Abbot, the scriptoria at Echternach would then become the most influential centre for Hiberno-Saxon style manuscript production in continental Europe.

== Production ==
Early medieval manuscripts were produced in monastic scriptoria by scribes and artists. These manuscripts were made of parchment or vellum, stretched calfskin, that was then cut to size at the monastery. Next, a scribe would copy the words of the text before an artist would illuminate, or paint, them. The folios, or pages, would be bound after all the art was completed. Multiple scribes and artists would work on a single manuscript. The primary artist that worked on the Echternach Gospels is believed to be the same master who created the Durham Gospels at Lindisfarne. This assumption is credible due to the similarities in the style of the art and the close date of production.

The styles of the Durham and Echternach Gospels belong to the Hiberno-Saxon style of early medieval Britain. This style is classified by intricate interlacing or linear patterns, flat geometric layout, and reduced schematic figures. The Evangelist portraits that precede each of the books in the Echternach Gospels depict the symbols of the Evangelists in a very flat representation surrounded by geometric patterns. The tradition of portraying each author's portrait comes from the late antique Roman style of manuscript illumination. As the Christian Church spreads across Europe, a resurgence of Imperial Roman conventions in art is evidenced as early as the 6th century through the Carolingian period. The Hiberno-Saxon artistic style, however, did not have a precedent for the naturalized figural representation growing in popularity. The very flat and stylized figural representation that we see in the Echternach Gospels are a result of the integration of the Roman author portrait convention depicted in the native visual language which emphasizes abstraction.

== Function ==
The Echternach Gospels were probably taken by Willibrord when he founded the Abbey of Echternach in the year 698. Willibrord, like many early medieval missionaries, travelled through Europe and used manuscripts to convert locals to Christianity. The Echternach Gospels are an example of illuminated manuscripts that served as teaching tools as well as liturgical books. It is argued that the bright colours and abstract designs of Hiberno-Saxon manuscripts, in particular, captured the mysticism of Christianity for non-Christians. Because these converts were illiterate the images were hugely significant for their understanding of what was taught. Bede, the eighth-century Northumbrian monk, writes that religious imagery was for the “intent that all who entered the church, even if ignorant of letters, might be able to contemplate … the ever-gracious countenance of Christ and his saints". The decoration of the text itself portrayed for the illiterate converts the mysticism and glory of the literal “Word of God.”

The importance of such manuscripts for medieval missionary work is evident in the work of the early British monks. For example, in the sixth century Columbanus founded many monasteries in Europe with an emphasis on manuscript production. Augustine, sent by Pope Gregory the Great in 597, travelled to England as a missionary for King Æthelberht of Kent, bringing many of his manuscripts with him as necessary conversion tools. The introduction of these and other such imported Roman codices influenced the Insular manuscripts such as the Echternach Gospels a century later.

== Context ==
The Synod of Whitby at Wearmouth-Jarrow was a significant Church ruling that affected the production of Insular manuscripts. The council was initially called to reconcile a dispute over the date of Easter and address other dissenting issues between Eastern and Western Christianity. Culminating with the ruling by King Oswy in 664, The Synod of Whitby stated an official preference of the Roman Christianity. Though this conclusion rejected Insular doctrine, the Hiberno-Saxon style script of manuscripts, however, was maintained and preferred throughout Europe. The result of this conflation of Eastern and Western Christianity is evident in the growing inclusion of Roman Style author portraits and Insular carpet pages while the text began to favour Roman capitals in Germanic runic-style script. These collaborative manuscripts which incorporate Roman conventions are depicted in the European tribal styles. This developing framework of medieval Christianity contextualizes many of these Hiberno-Saxon manuscripts, including the Echternach Gospels, under the canvas of the multicultural Roman Church.

== History and Relocation ==
The Echternach Gospels were removed from the abbey in 1802 when it was secularized after the French Revolution.

== Bibliography ==
- Alexander, J. J. G. Insular Manuscripts, 6th to the 9th Century. London: H. Miller, 1978.
- Bede (The Venerable). The Historical Works of the Venerable Beda. Translated by Rev. Joseph Stevenson. Oxford: Oxford University Press, 1853.
- Brown, Michelle. Manuscripts from the Anglo-Saxon Age. Toronto: University of Toronto Press, 2007.
- De Hamel, Christopher. A History of Illuminated Manuscripts. London: Phaidon Press, 1997.
- Hunter Blair, Peter. An Introduction to Anglo-Saxon England. New York: Cambridge University Press, 1977
- Oxford Art Online. “Grove Art Online: Manuscript.” Accessed June 4, 2013. http://www.oxfordartonline.com/subscriber/article/grove/art/T053965?q=the+Echternach+Gospels&search=quick&pos=6&_start=1#firsthit
- Schapiro, Meyer. The Language of Forms: Lectures on Insular Manuscript Art. New York: Pierpont Morgan Library, 2005.
- Snyder, James, Henry Luttikhuizen, and Dorothy Verkerk. Art of the Middle Ages. Upper Saddle River, NJ: Prentice Hall, 2006.
- Wilson, David M. Anglo-Saxon Art: From the Seventh Century to the Norman Conquest. London: Thames and Hudson, 1984.
