= Willibrord =

Anglo-Saxon monk, bishop and missionary (c.658–739)

Saint Willibrord OSB
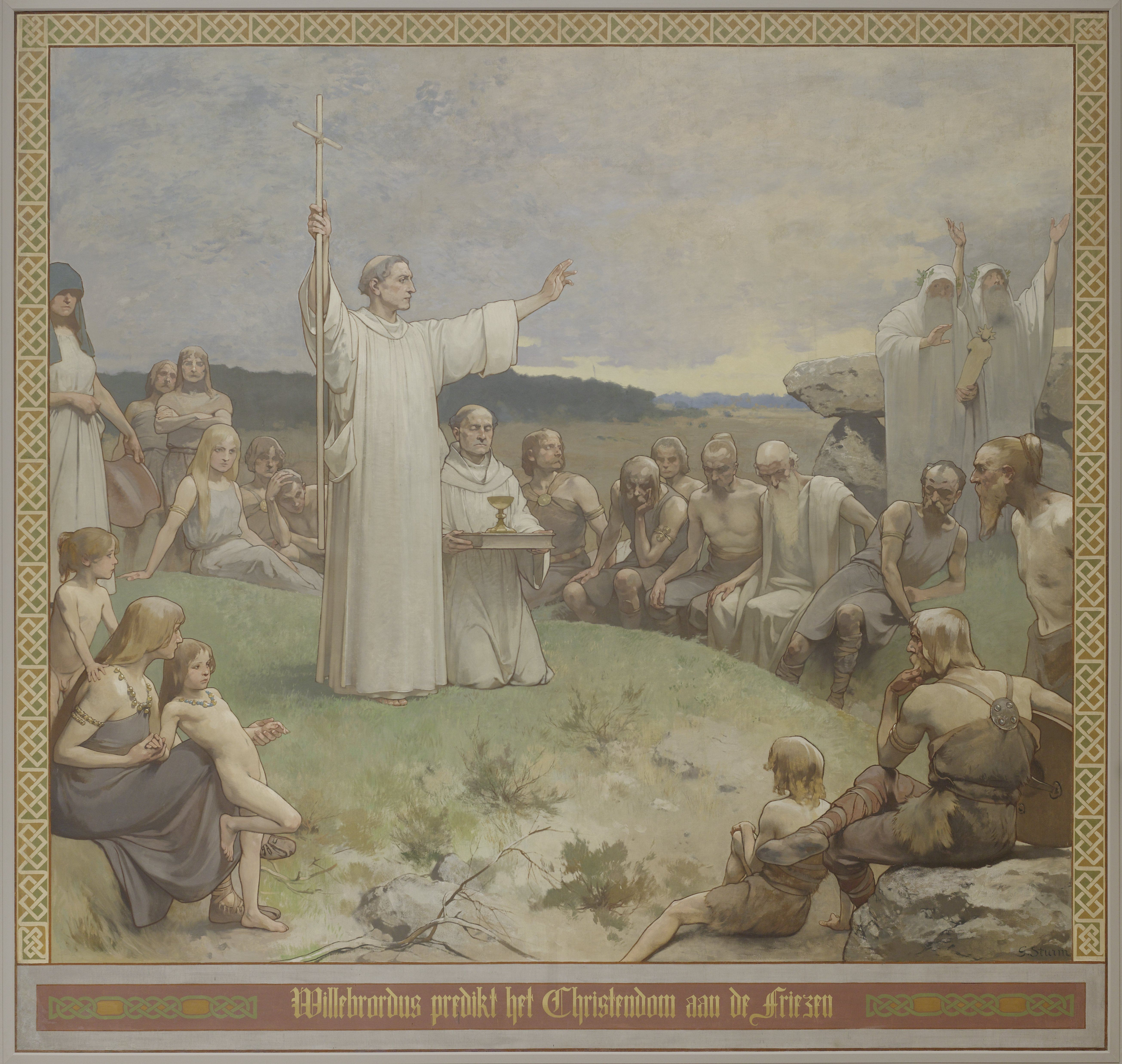
- Willibrord preaching to the Frisians. Mural in the Rijksmuseum by Georg Sturm.

Bishop Apostle to the Frisians
- Born: c. 658; Northumbria
- Died: 7 November 739 (aged 81)
- Venerated in: Catholic Church; Eastern Orthodox Church; Anglican Communion; Old Catholic Church
- Major shrine: Echternach
- Feast: 7 November
- Attributes: Dipping staff into cask
- Patronage: Convulsions; epilepsy; epileptics; Luxembourg; Netherlands; Archdiocese of Utrecht, Netherlands

Willibrord (Latin: Villibrordus; c. 658 – 7 November AD 739) was an Anglo-Saxon monk, bishop, and missionary. He became the first Bishop of Utrecht in what is now the Netherlands, dying at Echternach in Luxembourg, and is known as the "Apostle to the Frisians".

== Early life ==
His father, named Wilgils or Hilgis, was styled by Alcuin as a Saxon of Northumbria.

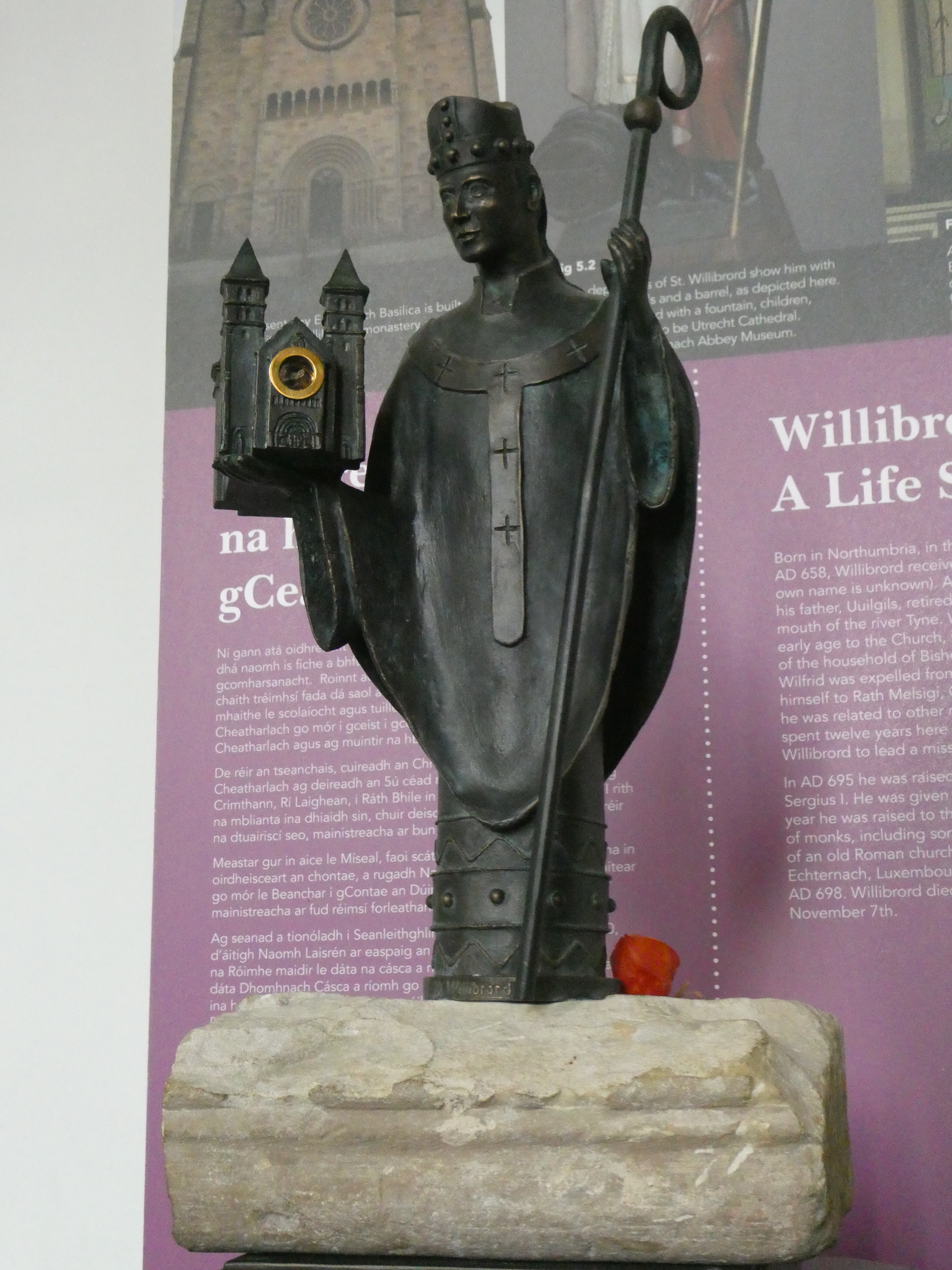
Statue in Carlow Cathedral, Ireland

Newly converted to Christianity, Wilgils entrusted his son as an oblate to Ripon Abbey, and withdrew from the world, constructing a small oratory, near the mouth of the Humber, dedicated to Saint Andrew. The king and nobles of the district endowed him with estates until he was at last able to build a church, over which Alcuin afterwards ruled.

Willibrord grew up under the influence of Wilfrid, Bishop of York. Later, he joined the Benedictines. He spent the years between the ages of 20 and 32 in the Abbey of Rath Melsigi, (Note: Rath Melsigi, traditionally identified as Mellifont in County Louth, Ireland, has not been securely located, despite its seventh-century prominence.) in County Carlow in southern Ireland, which was a centre of European learning in the 7th century.

== Frisia ==
During this time, he studied under Ecgberht of Ripon, who sent him and eleven companions to Christianise the pagan Frisians of the North Sea coast at the request of Pepin of Herstal, Austrasian mayor of the palace, who had nominal suzerainty over that region. Willibrord travelled to Rome twice. Both of these trips to Rome have historical significance.

According to Bede, Willibrord was not the only Anglo-Saxon to travel to Rome. The way he described the visit and its purpose is important: unlike the others, Willibrord was not on the usual pilgrimage to the graves of the apostles Peter and Paul and the martyrs. Rather, "he made haste to Rome, where Pope Sergius then presided over the apostolical see, that he might undertake the desired work of preaching the Gospel to the Gentiles, with his licence and blessing". As such, he came to the pope not as a pilgrim but specifically as a missionary. On 21 November 695, during his second visit to Rome, in the Church of Santa Cecilia in Trastevere, Pope Sergius I gave him a pallium and consecrated him as bishop of the Frisians. He returned to Frisia to preach and establish churches, among them a monastery at Utrecht, where he built his cathedral. Willibrord is counted as the first bishop of Utrecht.

In 698, he established the Abbey of Echternach on the site of a Roman villa in Echternach, which was donated to him by Pepin's mother-in-law, Irmina of Oeren, the wife of seneschal and Count Palatine Hugobert. After Hugobert died, Irmina founded a Benedictine convent at Horren in Trier. When a plague threatened her community, she gained the help of Willibrord; and when the pestilence passed by the convent, she gave Willibrord the lands for his abbey in Echternach.

Pepin of Herstal died in 714. In 716, the pagan Radbod, king of the Frisians, retook possession of Frisia, burning churches and killing many missionaries. Willibrord and his monks were forced to flee. After the death of Radbod in 719, Willibrord returned to resume his work under the protection of Charles Martel. He repaired the damage done there, ably assisted by Boniface.

== Veneration ==
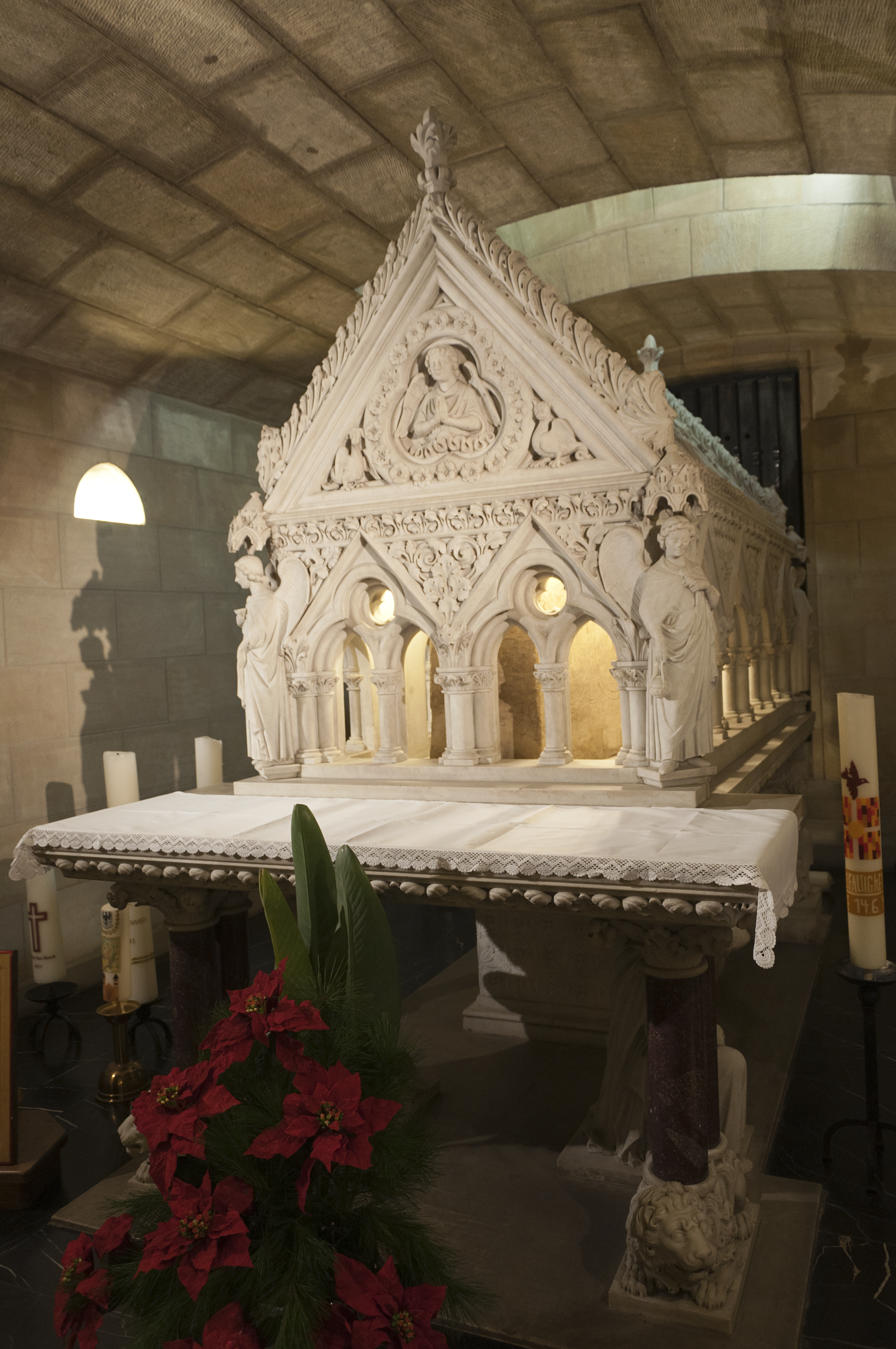
Tomb of Willibrord in the Abbey of Echternach in Luxembourg

Willibrord died on 7 November 739 at the age of 81, and according to his wish, was buried in Echternach. He was quickly canonized as a saint. Willibrord wells, which lay along his missionary routes, were visited by individuals seeking healing from various nervous diseases, particularly in children.

In the Catholic Church, his feast day is celebrated on 7 November outside England, but on 29 November in England, by order of Pope Leo XIII. Willibrord is honoured in the Church of England and in the Episcopal Church (US) on 7 November.

Numerous miracles and relics have been attributed to him. On one occasion, the transport of his relics was celebrated thus: "the five bishops in full pontificals assisted; engaged in the dance were 2 Swiss guards, 16 standard-bearers, 3,045 singers, 136 priests, 426 musicians, 15,085 dancers, and 2,032 players". A dancing procession continues to be held in Echternach every year on Whit Tuesday, and attracts thousands of participants and an equal number of spectators, to honour the memory of a saint who is often called the apostle of the Benelux countries (Belgium, the Netherlands, and Luxembourg).

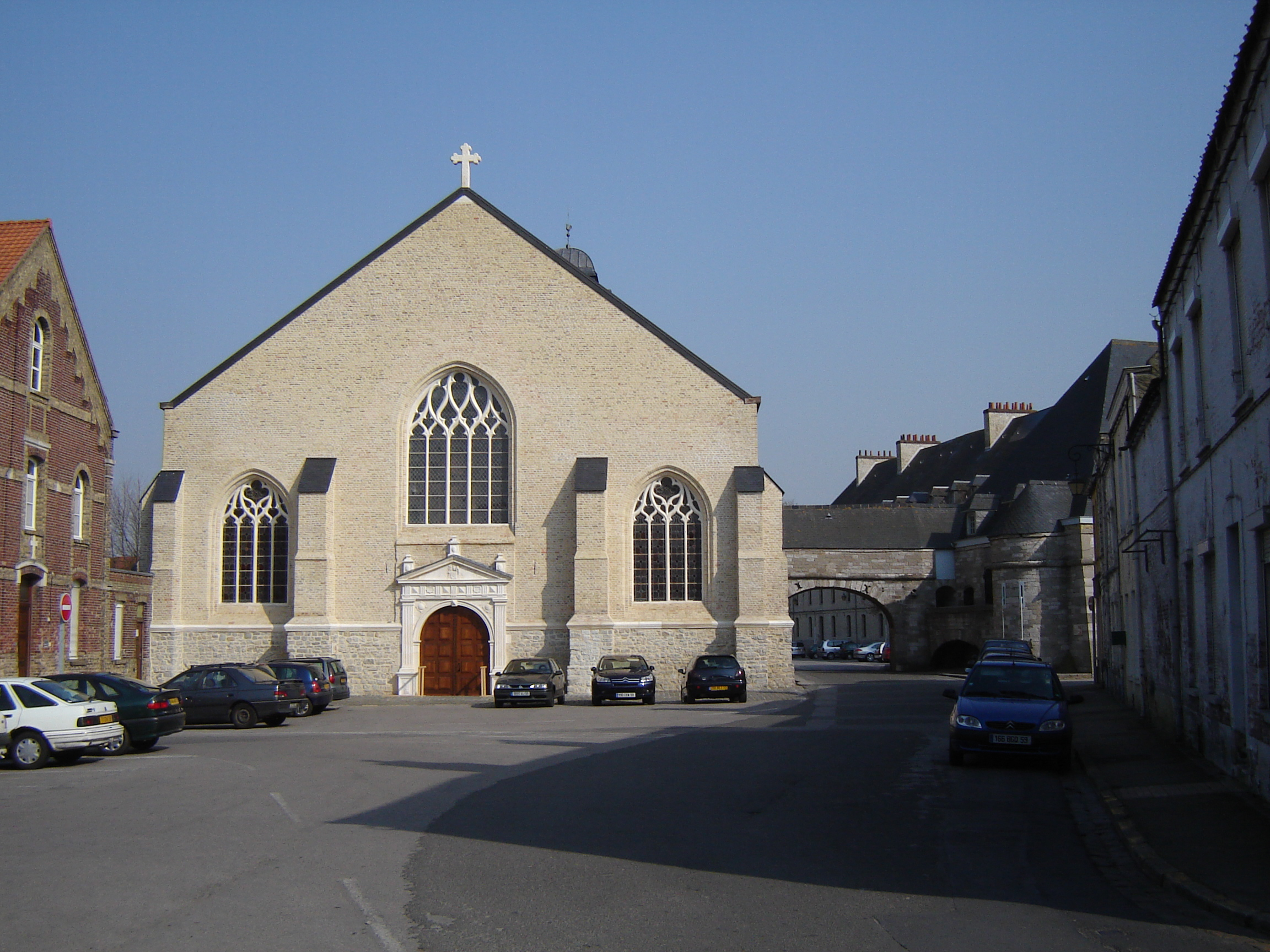
St Willibrord's Church at Gravelines

At Gravelines in northern France, where Willibrord is said to have landed after crossing the Channel on his mission to the Frisians, the church in the old town is dedicated to him. Gravelines developed after c. 800, around the chapel commemorating Willibrord's mission.

There is a 13th-century chapel dedicated to Willibrord at Weissenburg Abbey, Alsace, where Willibrord's benefactress Irmina of Oeren was also venerated.

== Sources ==
A Life was written by Alcuin and dedicated to the Abbot of Echternach. Alcuin likely used an earlier work by a British monk, now lost. Bede also makes mention of Willibrord.

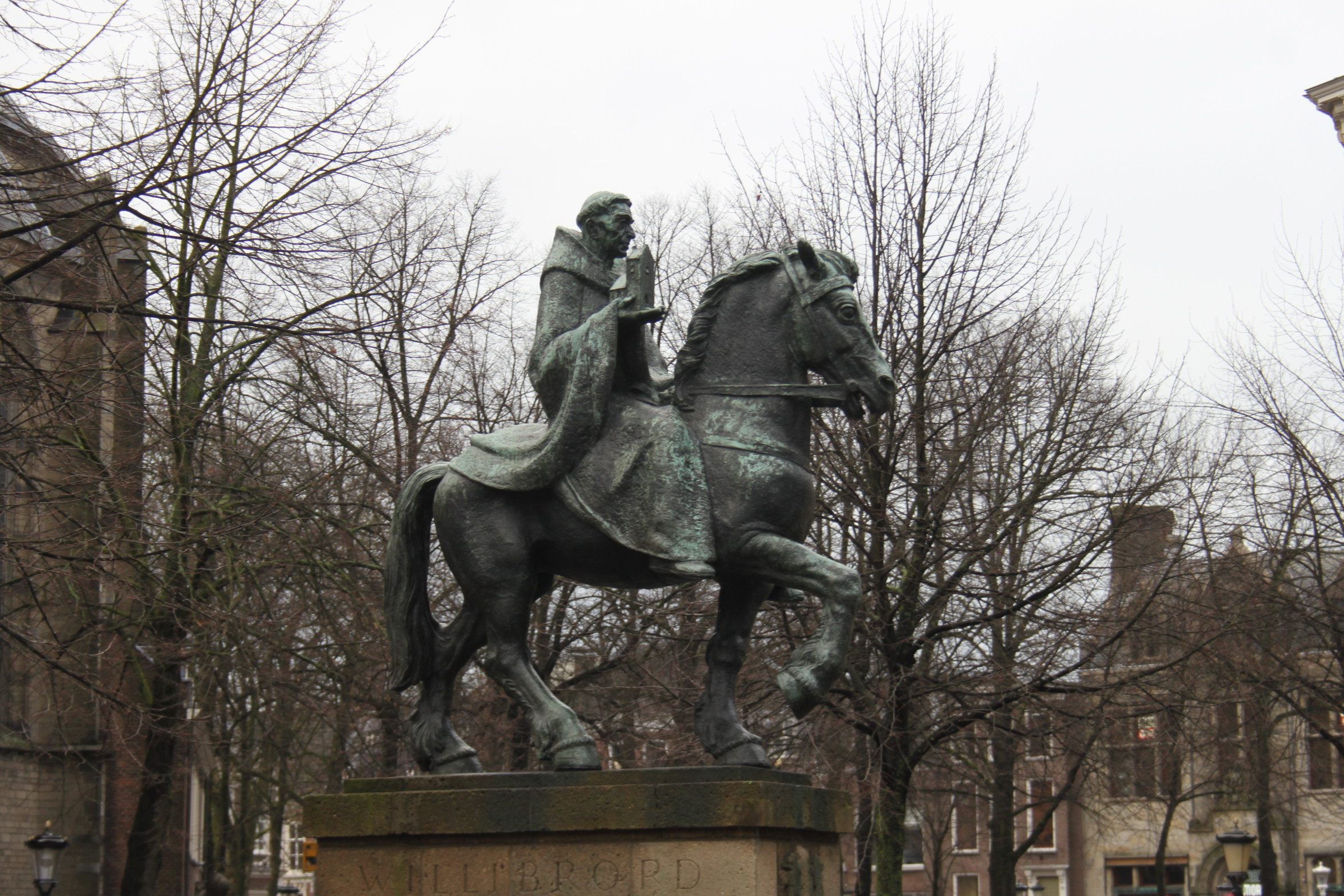
Statue of Saint Willibrord in Utrecht

Nothing written by Willibrord survives, save for a marginal note in the Calendar of Echternach, which provides some chronological data. The Echternach Gospels, a copy of the Gospels (Bibliothèque nationale, Paris, 9389) under the name of Willibrord, is an Irish codex no doubt brought by Willibrord from Ireland.

In 752/753, Boniface wrote a letter to Pope Stephen II, in which he says that Willibrord destroyed the Frisian pagan sanctuaries and temples.

In Alcuin's Life of Willibrord, there are two texts about Willibrord and pagan places of worship. In one, he arrived with his companions in Walcheren in the Netherlands, where he smashed a sculpture of the ancient religion. In the second text passage, Willibord arrived on an island called Fositesland (possibly Heligoland), where a pagan god named Fosite was worshipped. Here he despoiled this god of its sanctity by using the god's sacred well for baptisms and the sacred cattle for food.

== See also ==
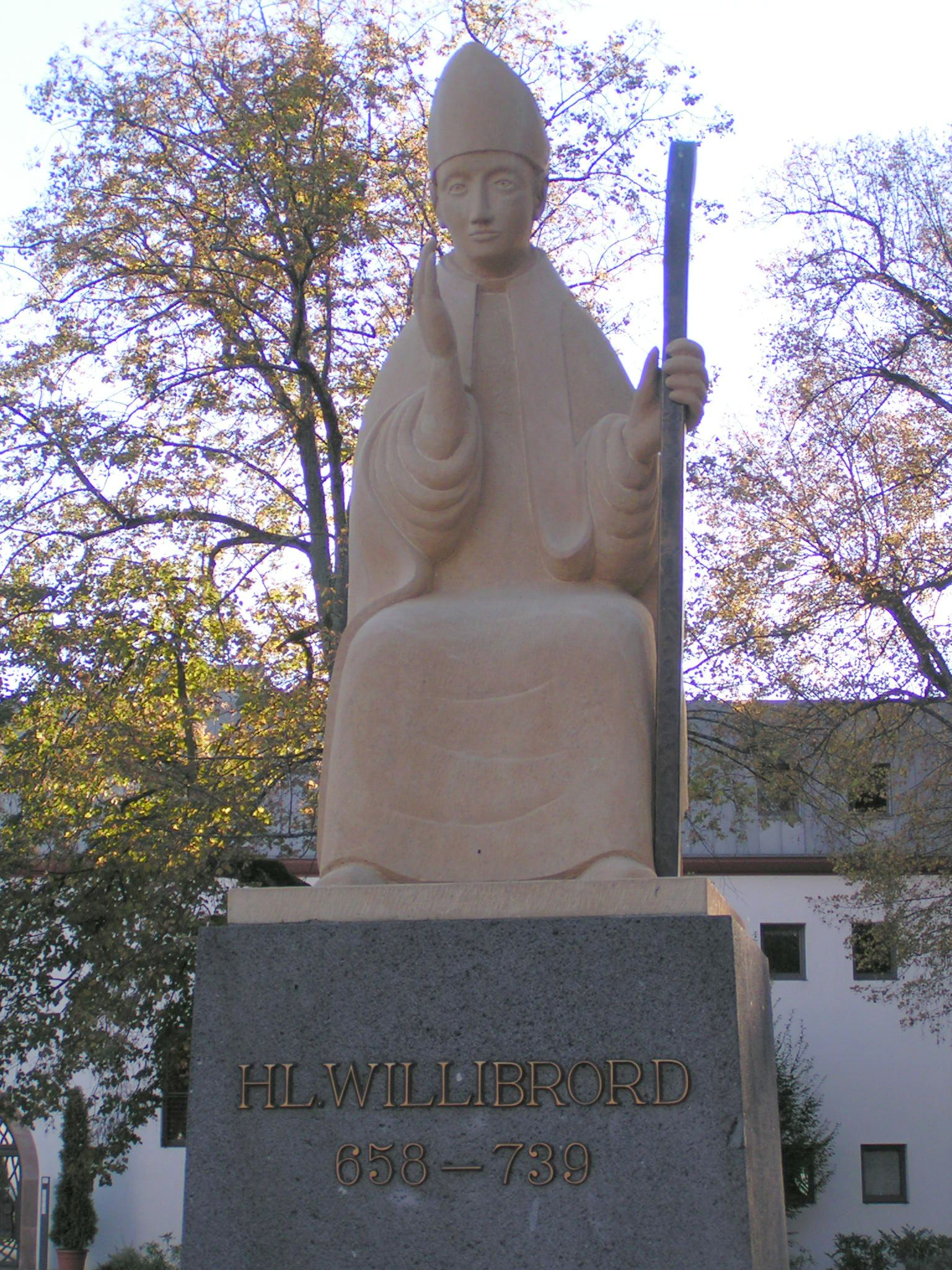
Willibrord Memorial at Trier

- Dancing procession of Echternach
- Echternach Gospels
- Anglo-Saxon mission
- The Willibrord Society promotes cooperation between Anglicans and Old Catholics

== Sources ==
- Alcuin (796). The Life of Willibrord.
- Bede (731). Ecclesiastical History of the English Nation, Book V.
- Broer, C.J.C.; de Bruijn, M.W.J. (1997). "Bonifatius en de Utrechtse kerk". In C. Dekker and E.S.C. Erkelens-Buttinger (ed.). De kerk en de Nederlanden (in Dutch). Verloren. ISBN 90-6550-558-X.
- Cróinín, Dáibhí (1984). "Rath Melsigi, Willibrord and the Earliest Echternach Manuscripts". Peritia. 3. Department of History, NUI Galway: 17–49.
- Paul Dräger (ed.), Alkuin, Vita sancti Willibrordi; Das Leben des heiligen Willibrord (Trier: Kliomedia, 2008)
- Mershman, Francis (1913). "St. Willibrord" . In Herbermann, Charles (ed.). Catholic Encyclopedia. New York: Robert Appleton Company.
- Mostert, M. (1999). 754 : Bonifatius Bij Dokkum Vermoord (in Dutch). Hilversum: Verloren. ISBN 90-6550-448-6.
