= Sainte-Chapelle Gospels =

- Artist: Master of the Registrum Gregorii
- Year: 977-993
- Medium: Illumination on 145 bound parchment folios
- Dimensions: 39 cm × 29 cm (15 in × 11 in)
- Location: Bibliothèque nationale de France; Paris
- Accession: Latin 8851

The Sainte-Chapelle Gospels or the Sainte-Chapelle Gospel Book is an Ottonian illuminated manuscript now housed in the Bibliothèque nationale de France in Paris as Latin 8851. It is made up of 156 parchment folios, in a 38.5 cm by 28 cm format, making it one of the largest manuscripts of its era. It includes miniatures such as the canon tables, Christ in majesty and the Four Evangelists. It is the work of the Master of the Registrum Gregorii, the most famous illuminator of the Ottonian Renaissance.

== Dating and provenance ==
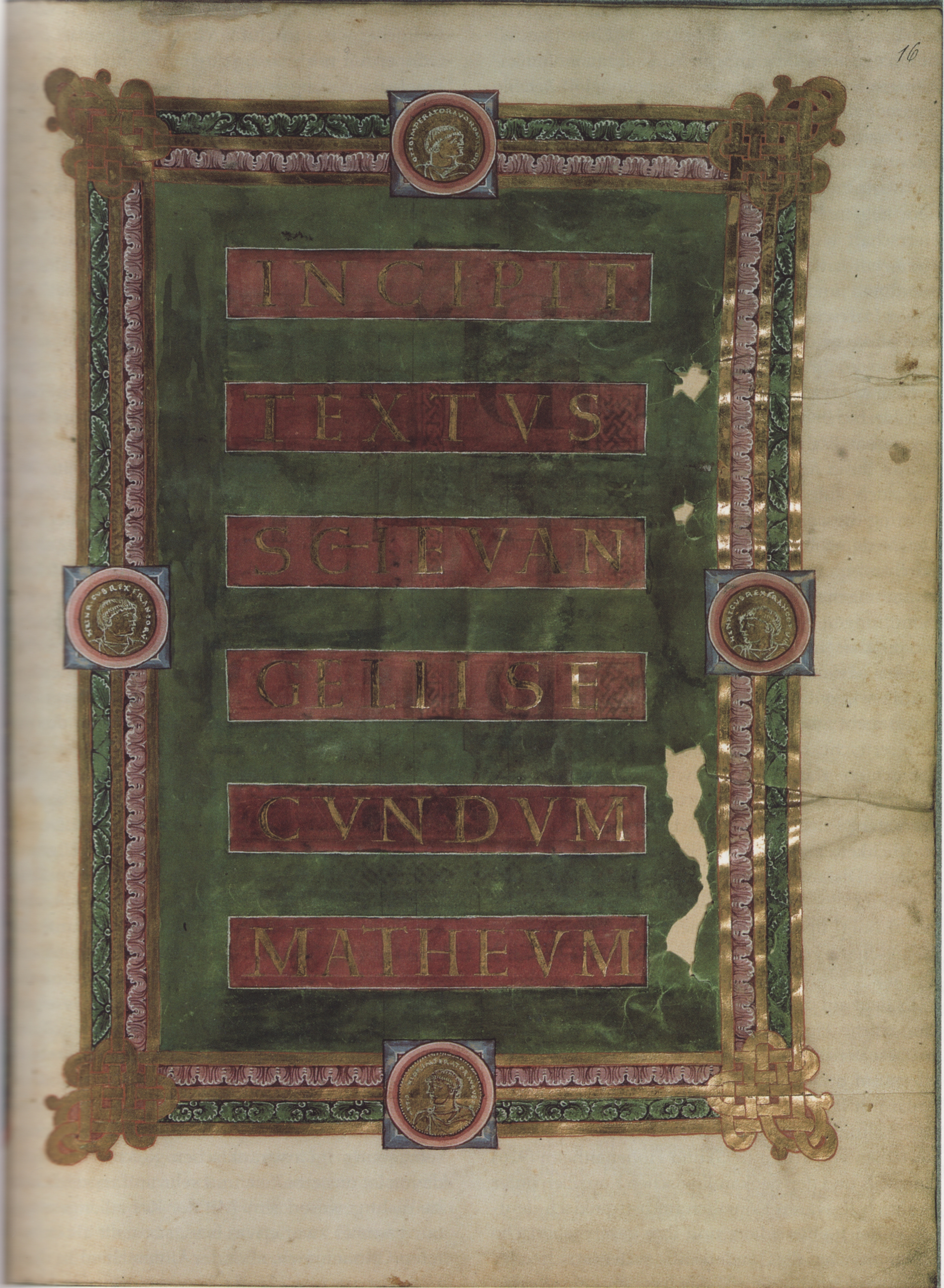
Title page of Saint Matthew's Gospel, recto of folio 16.

It does not contain a miniature showing the man or woman who commissioned it (probably someone of high rank) and it does not have a title page, making its dating uncertain. On its title page for St Matthew's Gospel (folio 16, recto) are four medallions showing inscribed portraits of one of the sovereigns of the era, one in each side of the border:

- Top: OTTO IMPERATOR AVG(ustus) ROMANOR(um) (Otto, Emperor Augustus of the Romans, ie Otto I or Otto II)
- Base: OTTO IUNIOR IMPERATOR AVGVST(u)S (Otto the Younger, Emperor Augustus ie Otto II or Otto III
- Left: HEINRICVS REX FRANCORV(m) (Henry, King of the Franks ie Henry of Germany or Saint Henry)
- Right: HENRICUS REX FRANCORVM (Henry, King of the Franks ie the same as the former, meaning Henry I or Henry II is shown twice)

If Saint Henry is shown, this would date the manuscript to between 1002 and 1014. However, the Master of the Registrum Gregorii worked before the end of the 10th century for Egbert of Trier, who died in 993. If that Master is accepted as the artist, the medallions either both show Henry I, who died 983 and was succeeded by Otto III. Carl Nordenfalk argues that the medallions represent Otto the Great, Otto II, Henry I and Henry II of Bavaria, who tried to seize power after Otto II's death and had support from Egbert of Trier, who voted for him in 984. This would mean the Gospel Book was initially created to offer to Henry II, who was not elected, and then quickly offering instead to empress Theophanu, thus explaining why it is incomplete.

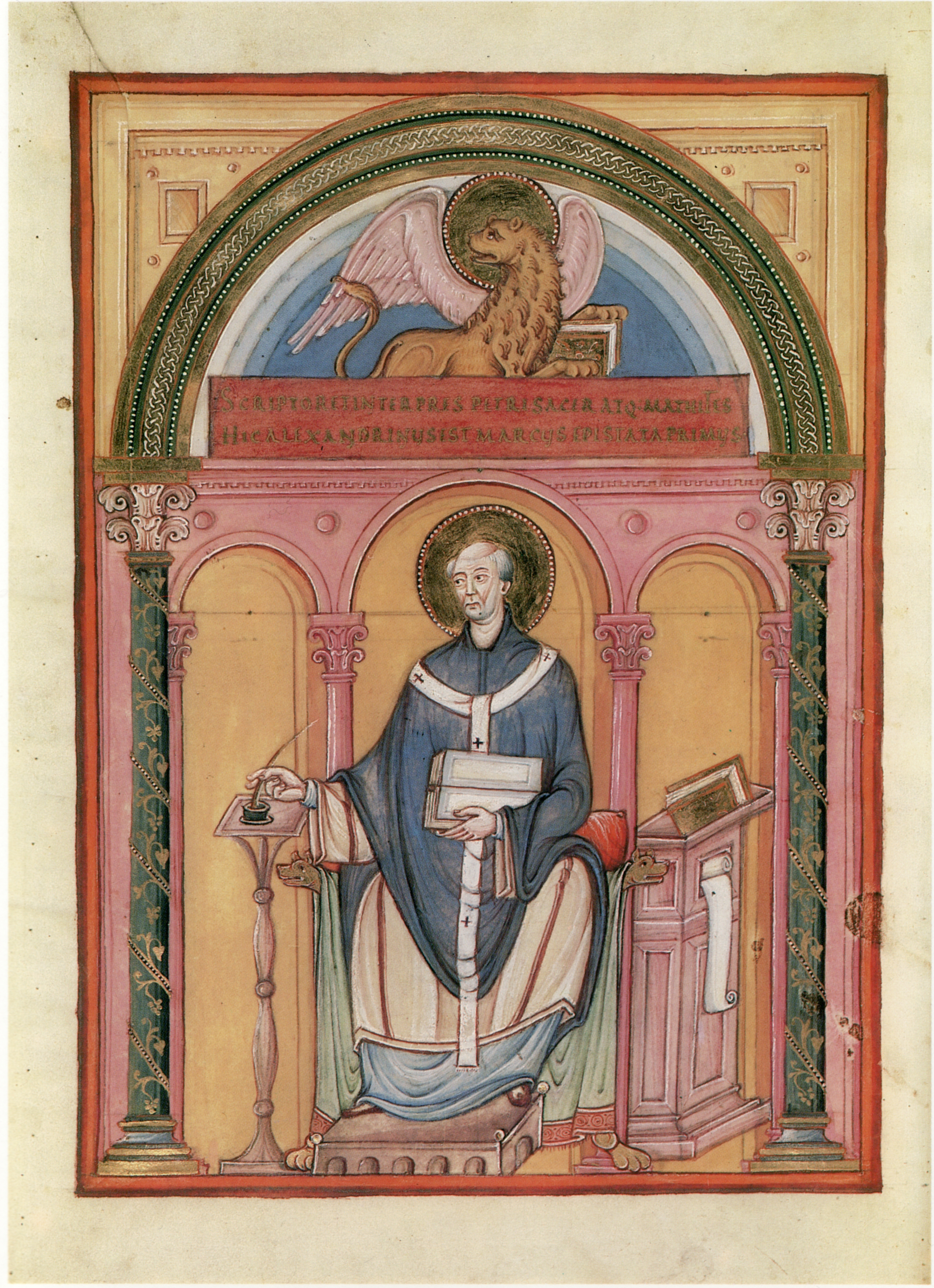
Mark the Evangelist, Folio 52 verso

The Gospel Book is bound in the same style as the Codex Aureus of Echternach, created at Echternach Abbey by goldsmiths from Egbert's studio shortly after 985. Egbert sent the Gospel Book and Codex to the empress, probably in an attempt at appeasement and reconciliation, adding the figure of Christ in Majesty. Finally both manuscripts moved to Echternach Abbey. In 1379 Charles V of France offered the Gospel Book to the treasury of the Sainte-Chapelle in Paris (giving it its present name) and it moved from there to the Bibliothèque nationale de France after the French Revolution.

== Artistic significance ==
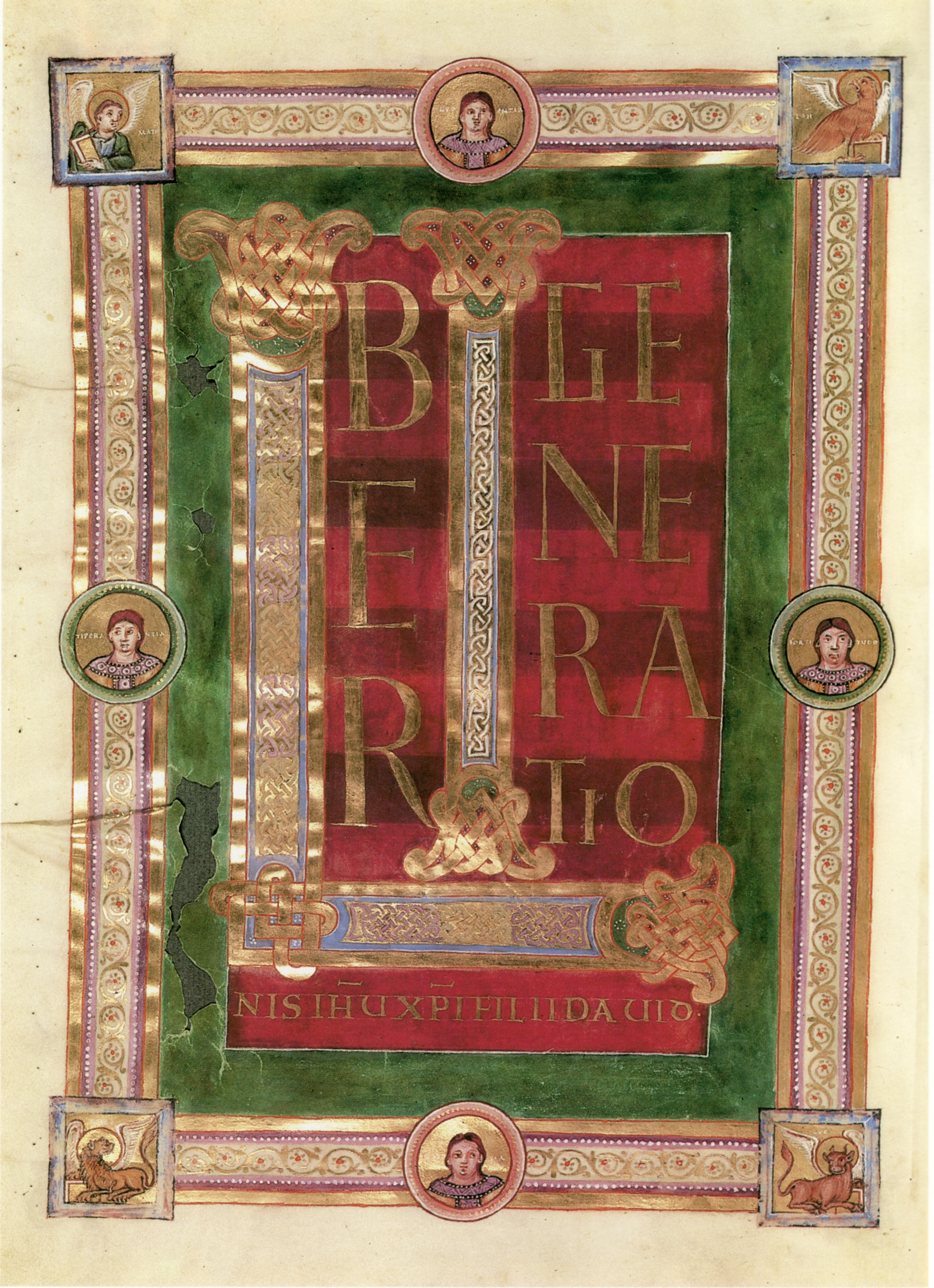
Folio 16 verso

The Gospel Book constitutes a high point in Ottonian illumination, moving from old models and serving as an exemplar for other scriptoriums. The inclusion of a Christ in Majesty and images of the Four Evangleists in its conception follows the example of 9th century manuscripts produced in Touraine. The Christ in Majesty was produced in the scriptorium of Echternach Abbey and is modeled on a Carolinigian bible created in Tours and found in Trier. The Four Evangelists were produced by different schools such as those of Reichenau Abbey and tend towards the style of classical antiquity and of Carolingian Ada Gospel Book, then in St. Maximin's Abbey, Trier. Two miniatures from the Pericopes of Henry II were inspired by them. Hartmut Hoffmann compared the inscription under the arch in the miniature of Luke the Evangelist marking the start of the Gospel of Luke to minuscule calligraphy known to be by the Master of the Registrum Gregorii, allowing him to be identified as its artist.

The Gospel Book belongs to a group of rare Ottonian manuscripts, the most important of which are the 1043-1046 Golden Gospels of Henry III (now in the Biblioteca del Real Monasterio de San Lorenzo de El Escorial, as Cod. Vitr. 17) and the Codex Aureus of Echternach with its Greek style lettering. The Gospel Book's image of Christ in Majesty includes a Greek and majuscule transcription of the Psalm "your kingdom is eternal and your power extends from age to age".

== Bibliography ==
- (in German) Walter Berschin, Drei griechische Majestas-Tituli in der Trier-Echternacher Buchmalerei, in: Wilhelm Nyssen, Begegnung zwischen Rom und Byzanz um das Jahr 1000. Zum tausendsten Todestag der Kaiserin Theophanu, Cologne, 1991, pp.37-52
- (in German) Hartmut Hoffmann, Buchkunst und Königtum im ottonischen und frühsalischen Reich, Stuttgart, 1986
- (in German) Franz J. Ronig, Egbert. Erzbischof von Trier 977-993. Gedenkschrift der Diözese Trier zum 1000. Todestag, édition du Rheinisches Landesmuseum de Trèves, 1993
