= Hartmut Hoffmann =

German medieval historian

Hartmut Hoffmann (4 May 1930, Berlin – 16 April 2016) was a German medieval historian.

== Life ==
He studied philosophy, art history, German studies, history and Latin philology at Frankfurt University, Marburg University and Cologne University. He graduated PhD in 1954 with a thesis on Carolingian history entitled Untersuchungen zur karolingischen Annalistik. He habilitated from Bonn University in 1961 with a thesis entitled Gottesfriede und Treuga Dei and taught as professor of medieval and contemporary history at Göttingen University from 1967.

He published several works on medieval history, especially on religious and cultural life. In 1980 he published a new study on the Chronicles of Monte Cassino in Scriptores, a collection of essays published by Monumenta Germaniæ Historica - this led to several articles on the historiography of southern Italy in the Lombard and Norman eras and on the role of the papacy. He was one of the chief editors of the Monumenta from 1982 and also was appointed to the Göttingen Academy of Sciences in 1982.

His works on Ottonian and Salic monarchy and illumination (he notably wrote on the Sainte-Chapelle Gospel Book and the Master of the Registrum Gregorii) opened the way for the publication of the Richerus Chronicles in 2000.

== Selected works ==
- (in German) Die Würzburger Paulinenkommentare der ottonenzeit, Hanovre, 2009
- (in German) Mönchskönig und "rex idiota". Studien zur Kirchenpolitik Heinrichs II. und Konrads II., Hanovre, 1993
- (in German) Buchkunst und Königtum im ottonischen und frühsalischen Reich, Stuttgart, 1986
- (in German) Gottesfriede und Treuga Dei, 1964
- (in German) Untersuchungen zur karolingischen Annalistik, Bonn, 1958

== Bibliography ==
- Verleihung des Preises des Historischen Kollegs. 1: Erste Verleihung des Preises des Historischen Kollegs: Aufgaben, Stipendiaten, Schriften des Historischen Kollegs. München 1984, S. 60f.
- Rudolf Schieffer: Hartmut Hoffmann (1930–2016). In: Historische Zeitschrift 303 (2016), S. 459–463.
- Eva Schlotheuber: Nachruf Hartmut Hoffmann. In: Deutsches Archiv für Erforschung des Mittelalters. Jg. 72 (2016), S. 207–212.
- https://portal.dnb.de/opac.htm?method=simpleSearch&query=131955691
- http://opac.regesta-imperii.de/lang_de/suche.php?qs=&ts=&ps=Hoffmann%2C+Hartmut&ejahr=&sprache=&objektart=alle&pagesize=20&sortierung=d
