= Master of the Registrum Gregorii =

10th-century scribe and illuminator

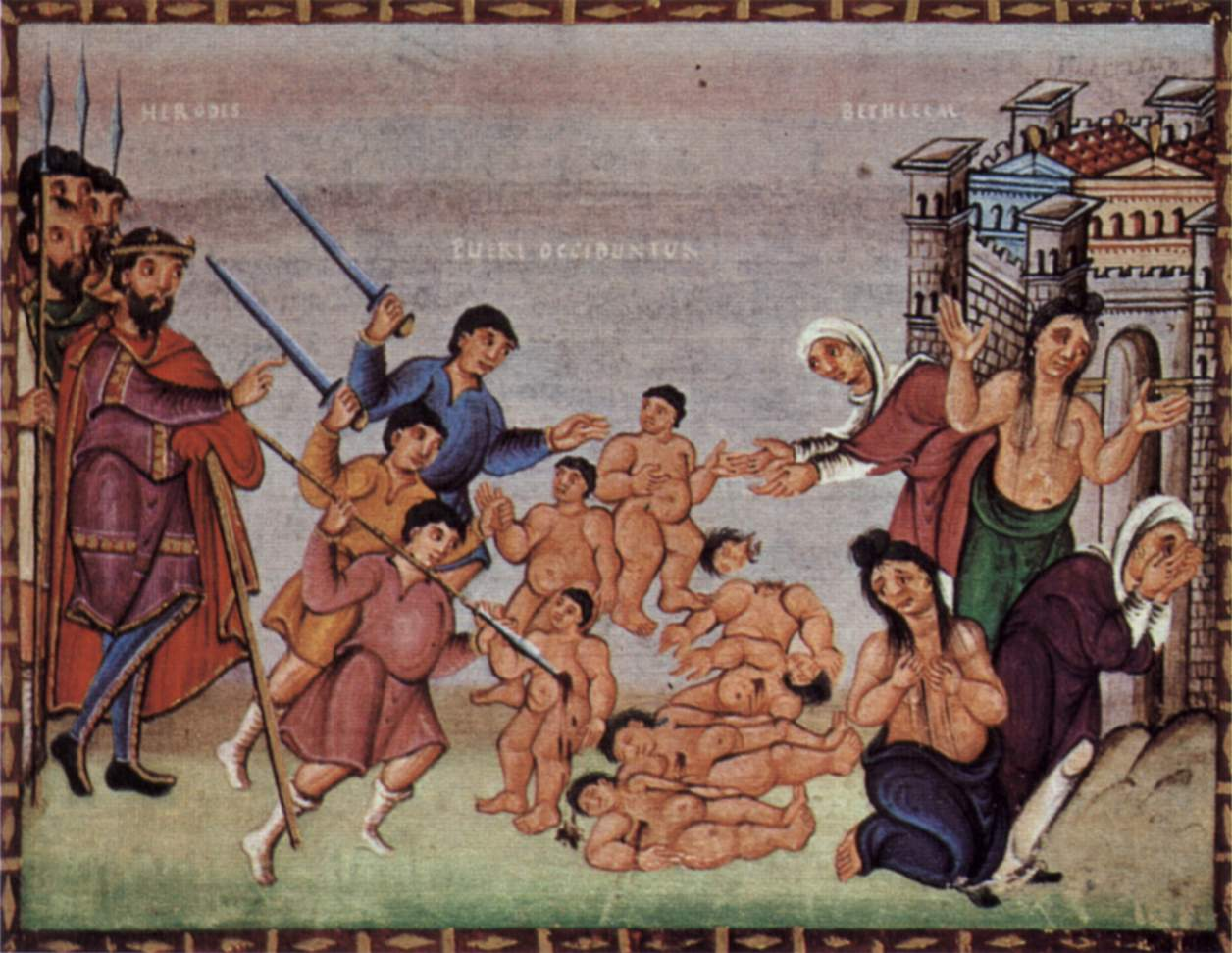
The Massacre of the Innocents by the Master of the Registrum Gregorii, from the Egbert Codex

The Master of the Registrum Gregorii, also known as the Registrum Master or the Gregory Master, was an anonymous 10th-century scribe and illuminator, active in Trier during the episcopate of Egbert of Trier.

His work is generally figural and characterized by large, statuesque figures enveloped in highly stylized drapery that suggest a volumetric body beneath them. Shading is accomplished by lightening with white and darkening with deeper tones of the same color. The heads of the figures tend to be proportionally small, however, the faces are rendered especially well. The attention to individual details suggests portraiture. Backgrounds are sparse or a flat gradient of usually a single color with the lighter shade above and the darker below. Overall, the Master of the Registrum Gregorii's style is iconic and monumental and represents the pinnacle of Ottonian manuscript illumination.

Codices containing work ascribed to him include:

- The Registrum Gregorii (Trier, Stadtbibliothek, Hs. 171/1626)
- Two Trier sacramentaries (Chantilly, Musée Condé, Ms. 40, ex. 1447, and Paris, Bibliothèque Nationale, Lat. 10501)
- The Codex Egberti (seven miniatures)
- The Sainte-Chapelle Gospel Book (Paris, Bibliothèque Nationale, Lat. 8851)
- The small Egbert Psalter (Trier, Stadtbibliothek, Ms. 7/9)
- The Strahov Evangelary (Prague, Library of the Royal Canonry of Premontstratensians at Strahov, DF III 3)

== Bibliography ==
- Henry Mayr-Harting, Ottonian Book Illumination: An Historical Study, part II (London, 1991), pp. 61–63.
- Carl Nordenfalk, "The Chronology of the Registrum Master", in Kunsthistorische Forschungen: Otto Pächt zu seinem 70. Geburtstag, edited by Carlo Bertelli, Artur Rosenauer, Gerold Weber (Salzburg, 1972), pp. 62–76. ISBN 3-7017-0027-3.
