= Codex Aureus of Echternach =

11th-century illuminated Gospel Book

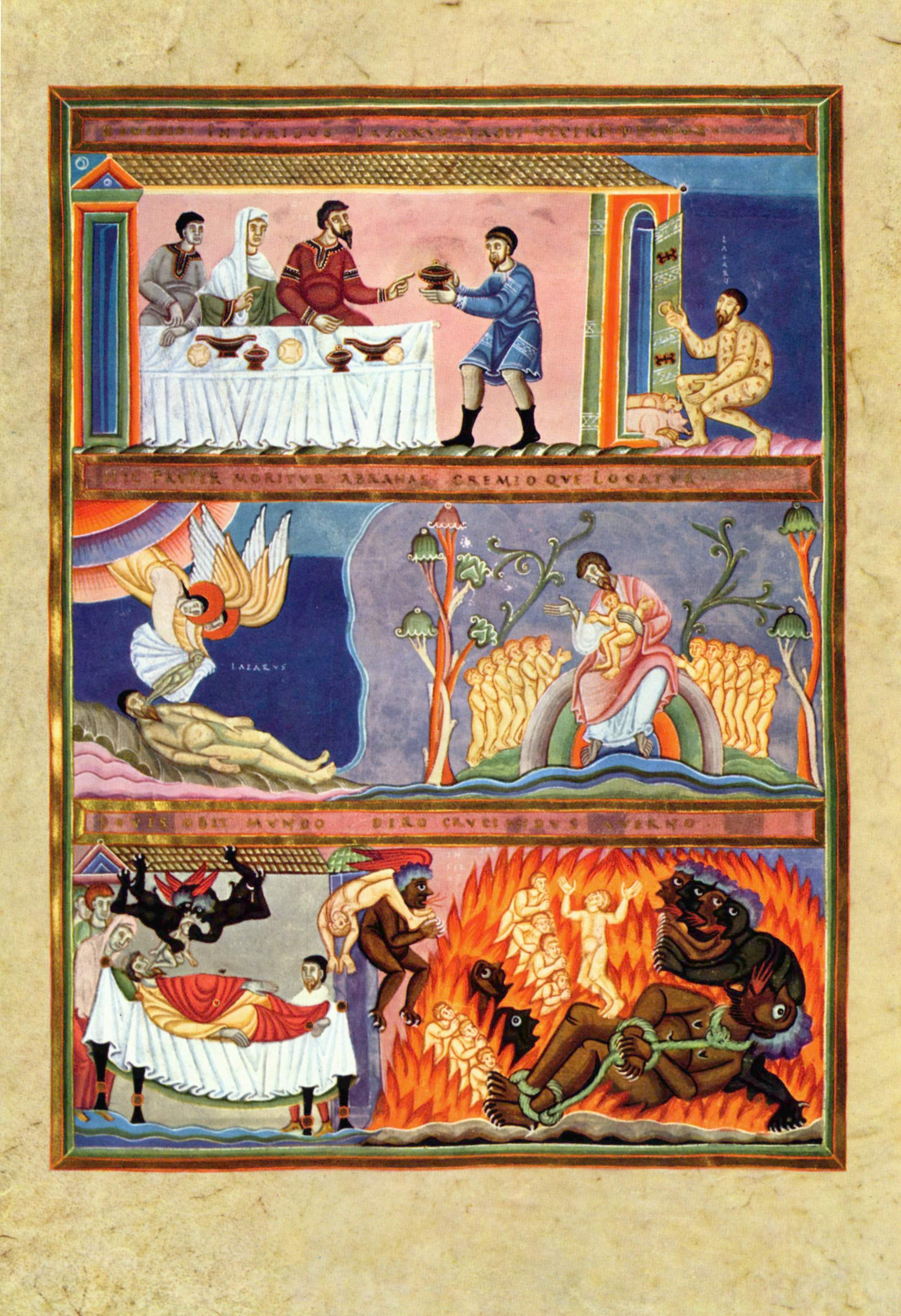
Folio 78 recto from the Codex Aureus of Echternach, Lazarus and Dives

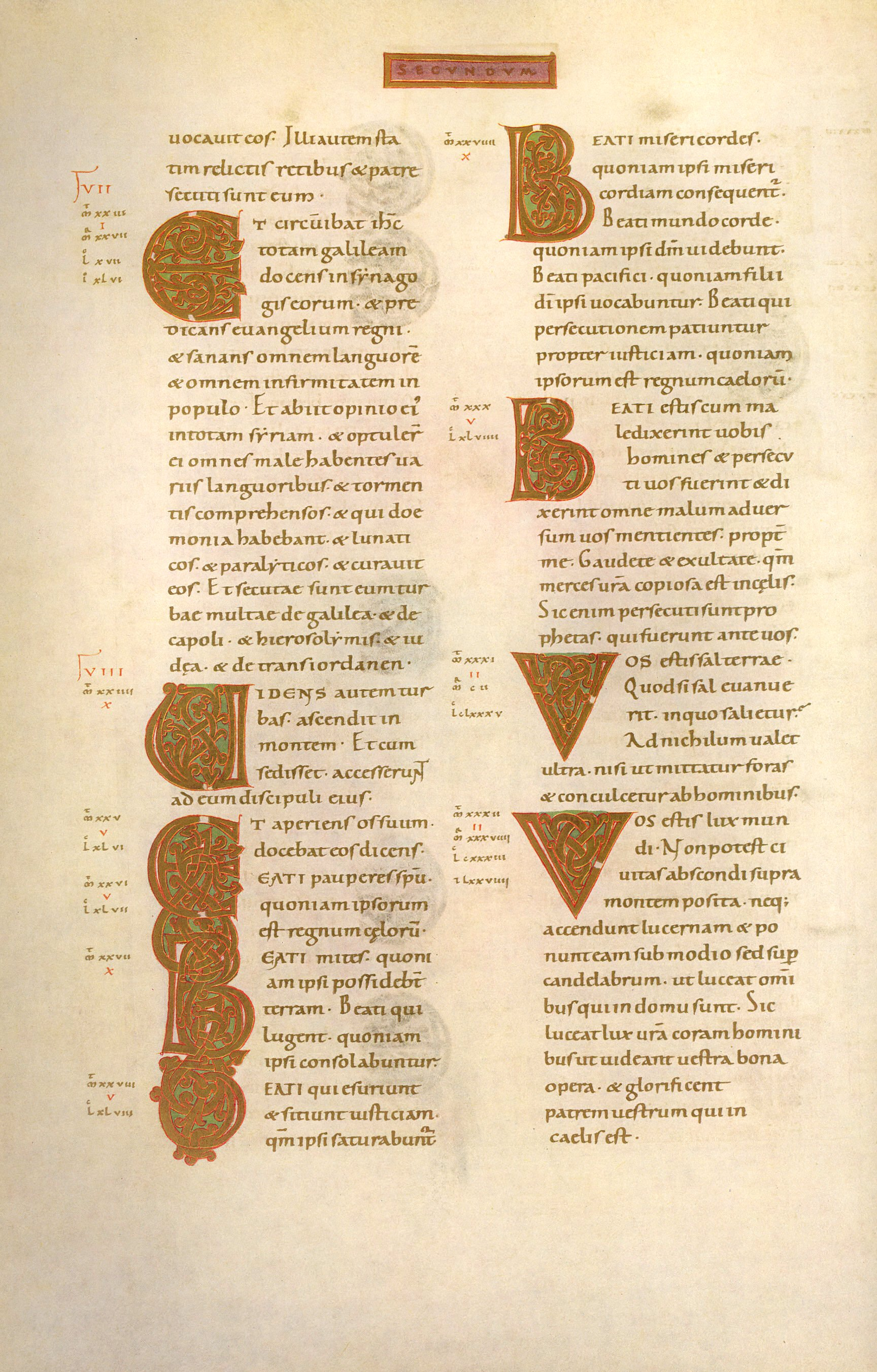
Text page (Mt 4:22–5:16)

The Codex Aureus of Echternach (Codex aureus Epternacensis) is an illuminated Gospel Book, created in the approximate period 1030–1050, with a re-used front cover from around the 980s. It is now in the Germanisches Nationalmuseum in Nuremberg.

The manuscript contains the Vulgate versions of the four gospels plus prefatory matter including the Eusebian canon tables, and is a major example of Ottonian illumination, though the manuscript, as opposed to the cover, probably falls just outside the end of rule by the Ottonian dynasty. It was produced at the Abbey of Echternach under the direction of Abbot Humbert.

The manuscript has 136 folios which measure 446 mm by 310 mm. It is one of the most lavishly illuminated Ottonian manuscripts. It contains over 60 decorative pages including 16 full page miniatures, 9 full page initials, 5 evangelist portraits, 10 decorated pages of canon tables, and 16 half-page initials. In addition there are 503 smaller initials, and pages painted to resemble textiles. The entire text is written in gold ink.

== Text and miniatures ==
Each gospel is preceded by the following: two pages summarizing the gospel, two pages imitating textiles, four pages of narrative scenes laid out in three registers per page, a full-page evangelist portrait, two pages of decorative text, before a full-page initial, which begins the actual text. As one art historian put it, the planner of the book "was in no hurry to bring his reader to the text". The narrative scenes cover the Life of Christ, including many of his miracles, and preceding Luke his parables, which by this date was becoming unusual. There are one, two or sometimes three scenes in each register, giving a total of 48 framed images with 60 scenes, an unusually large number for a medieval cycle. Unlike the comparable scenes in the Augustine Gospels, the scenes are arranged to cover the life and ministry of Jesus without concern for whether a particular scene is covered in the gospel it precedes.

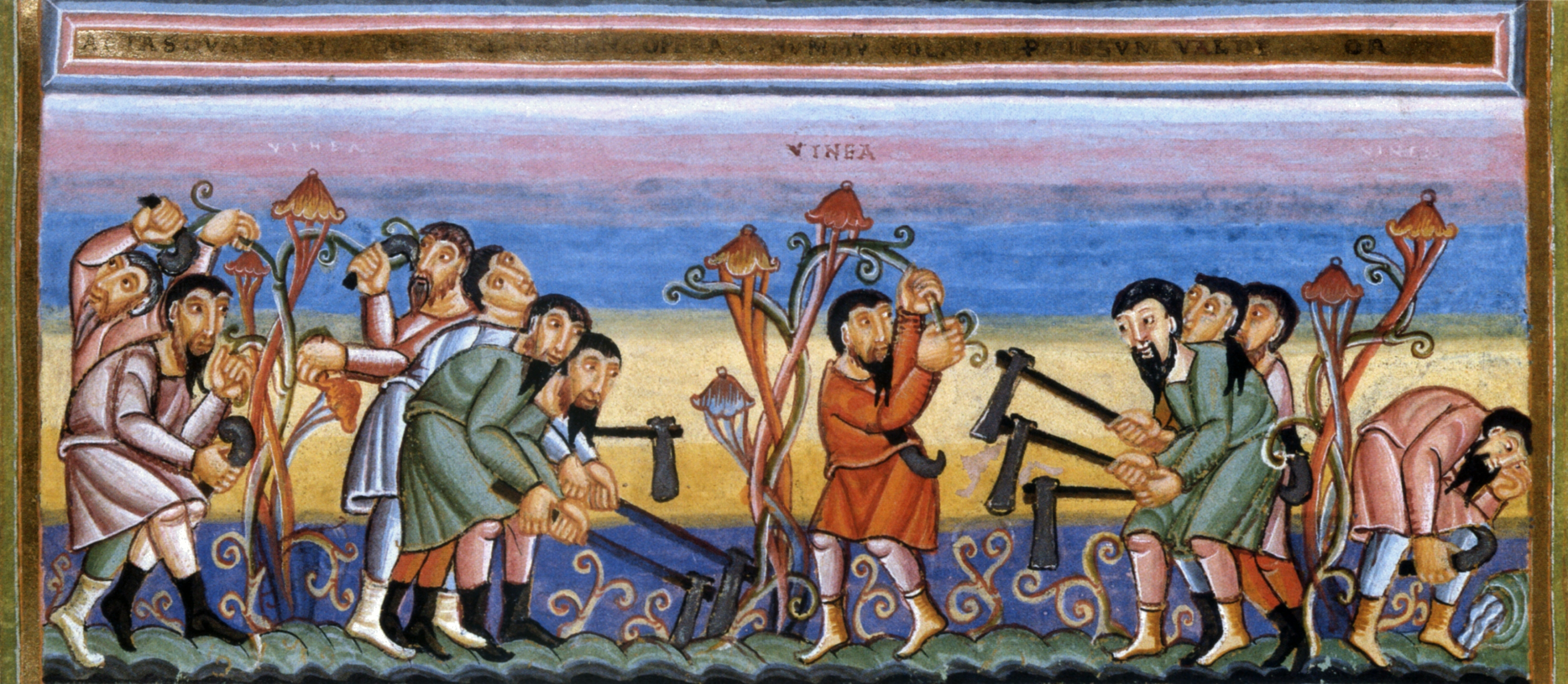
Labourers in the vineyard

The pages before Matthew take the story from the Annunciation to the "Feast in the House of Levi", and those before Mark cover miracles from the Wedding at Cana to the Samaritan thanking Jesus after Cleansing ten lepers (Luke 17:11-19). The scenes before Luke show four of the parables of Jesus, each over a whole page: the Parable of the Workers in the Vineyard, Parable of the Wicked Husbandmen, the Parable of the great banquet and the Rich man and Lazarus. The pages preceding John cover the final period, from the Passion of Jesus to his Ascension and Pentecost.

Most of the miniatures are attributed to two artists, known as the "workshop master" and another presumed to be a pupil. A third, cruder, painter contributed some of the narrative scenes, and perhaps other elements which are harder to attribute. For example, the last three pages of the final narrative scenes preceding John are attributed to the master (so from the Crowning with Thorns onwards), and the first page to the pupil. It is likely that the compositions and underdrawings were all by the master, so the changes of painter are not over-conspicuous. The style has been criticized for excessive interest in decorative effect: it "produced some vigorous and cheerful patterns, as in the St Luke, but it could descend to fussiness, as in the Christ in Majesty, where the strength of the composition has been frittered away by the ornamental vagaries of the Echternach artist. This weakness was even more apparent in the evangelist 'portraits', where the ornamental bands of the Sainte-Chapelle Gospels are degraded into decorative garrulity, and there is so little weight and structure under the draperies that they might be covering mere inanimate cushions."

=== A run of four pages preceding Matthew ===
These come after the two textile pages and the four pages of narrative images.

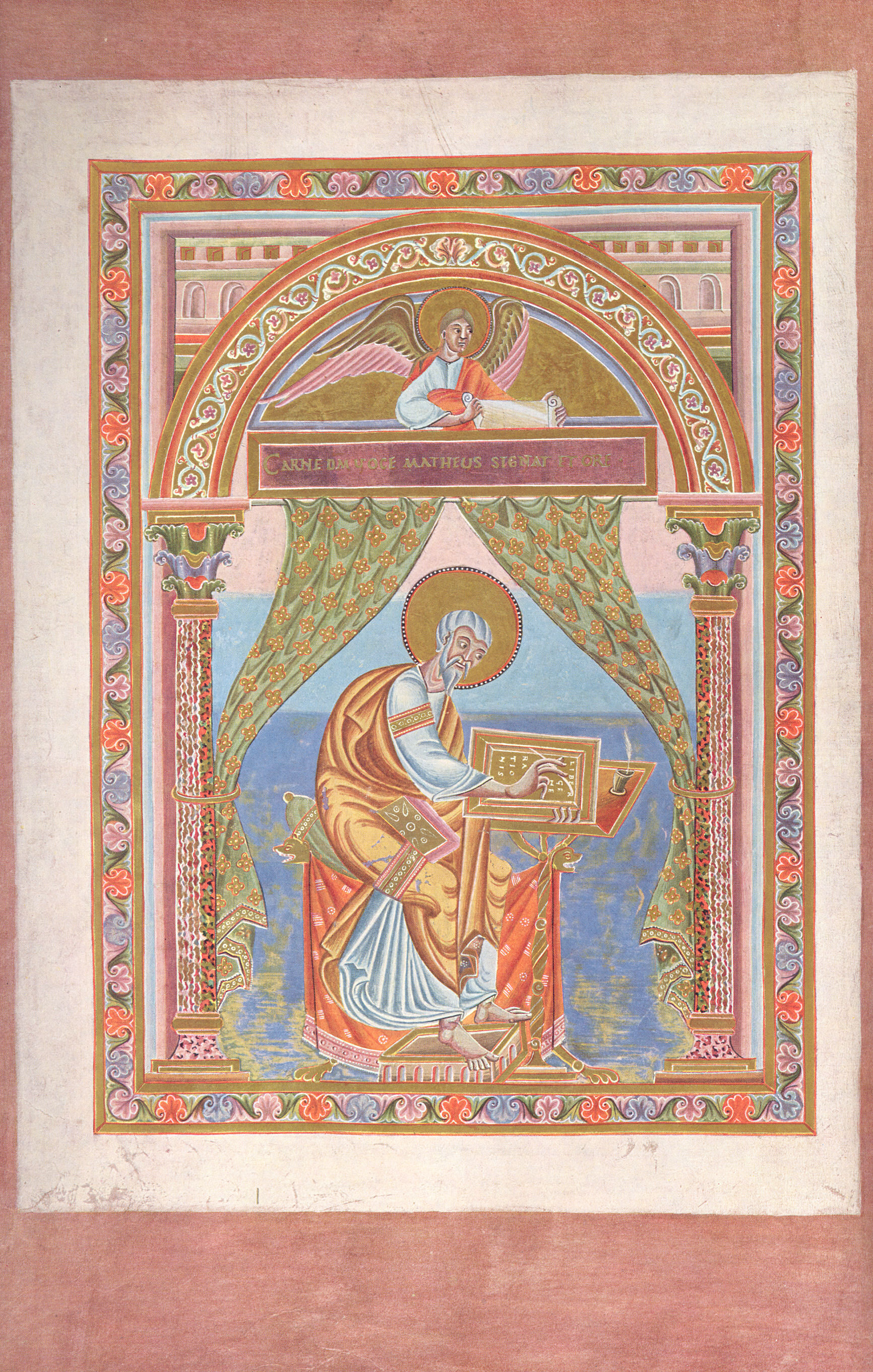
Evangelist portrait (Matthew), folio 20 verso

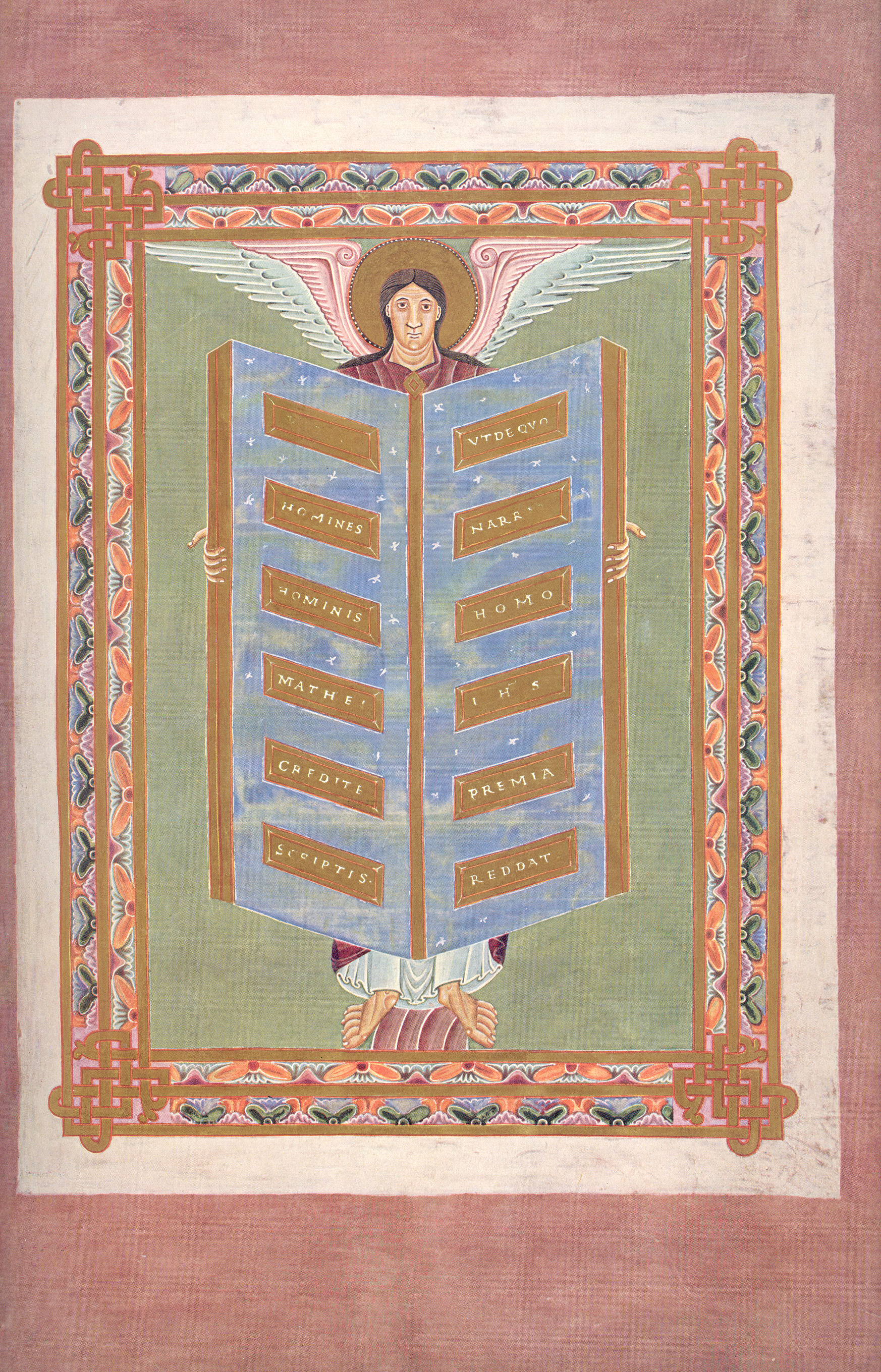
Angel holding "tablet", folio 21 recto, with text "Ye men, believe the word of the man Matthew, so that He of Whom he speaks, the Man Jesus, may reward ye".

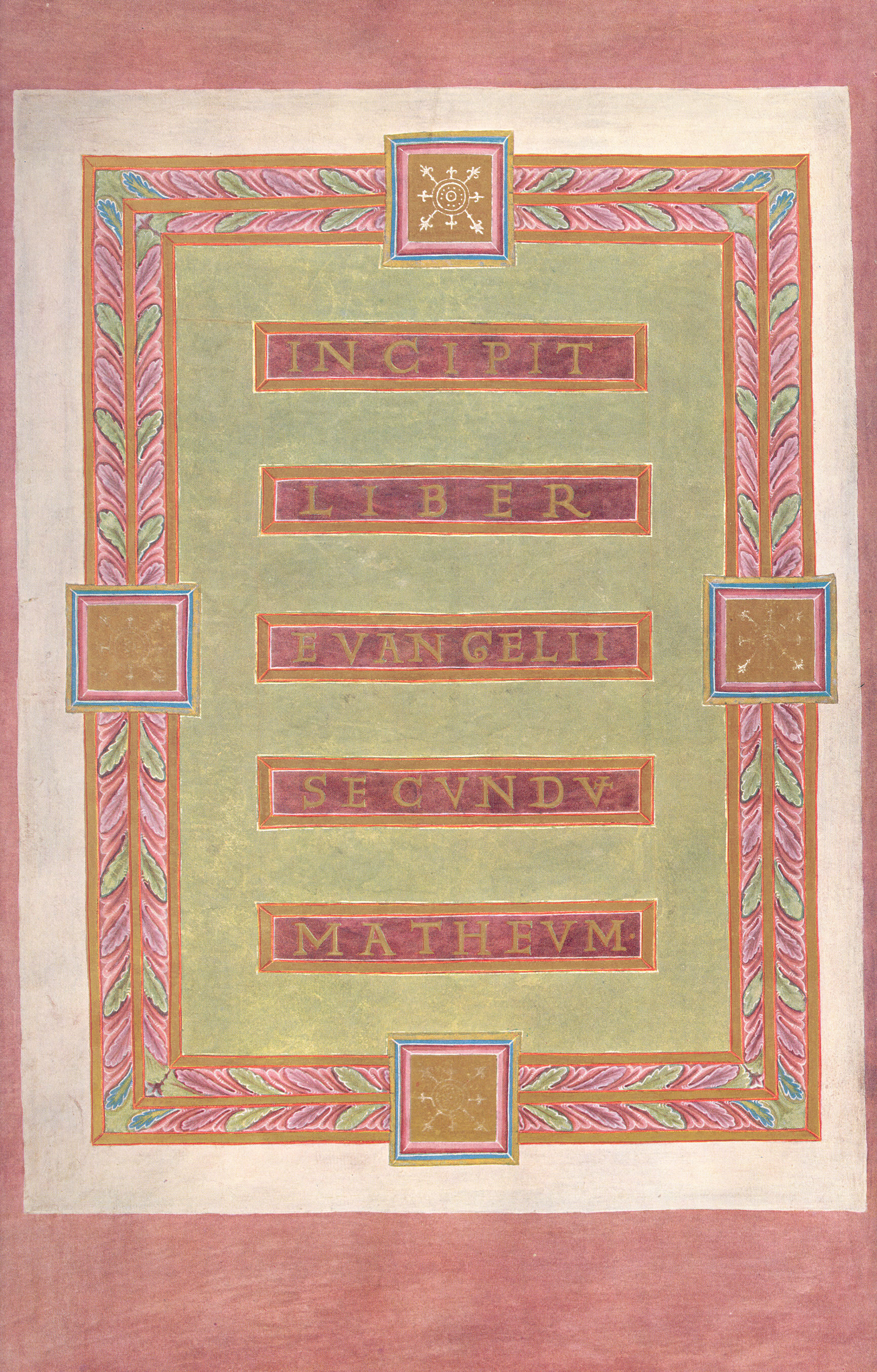
"Incipit" page *"Here begins the Gospel of Matthew", folio 21 verso

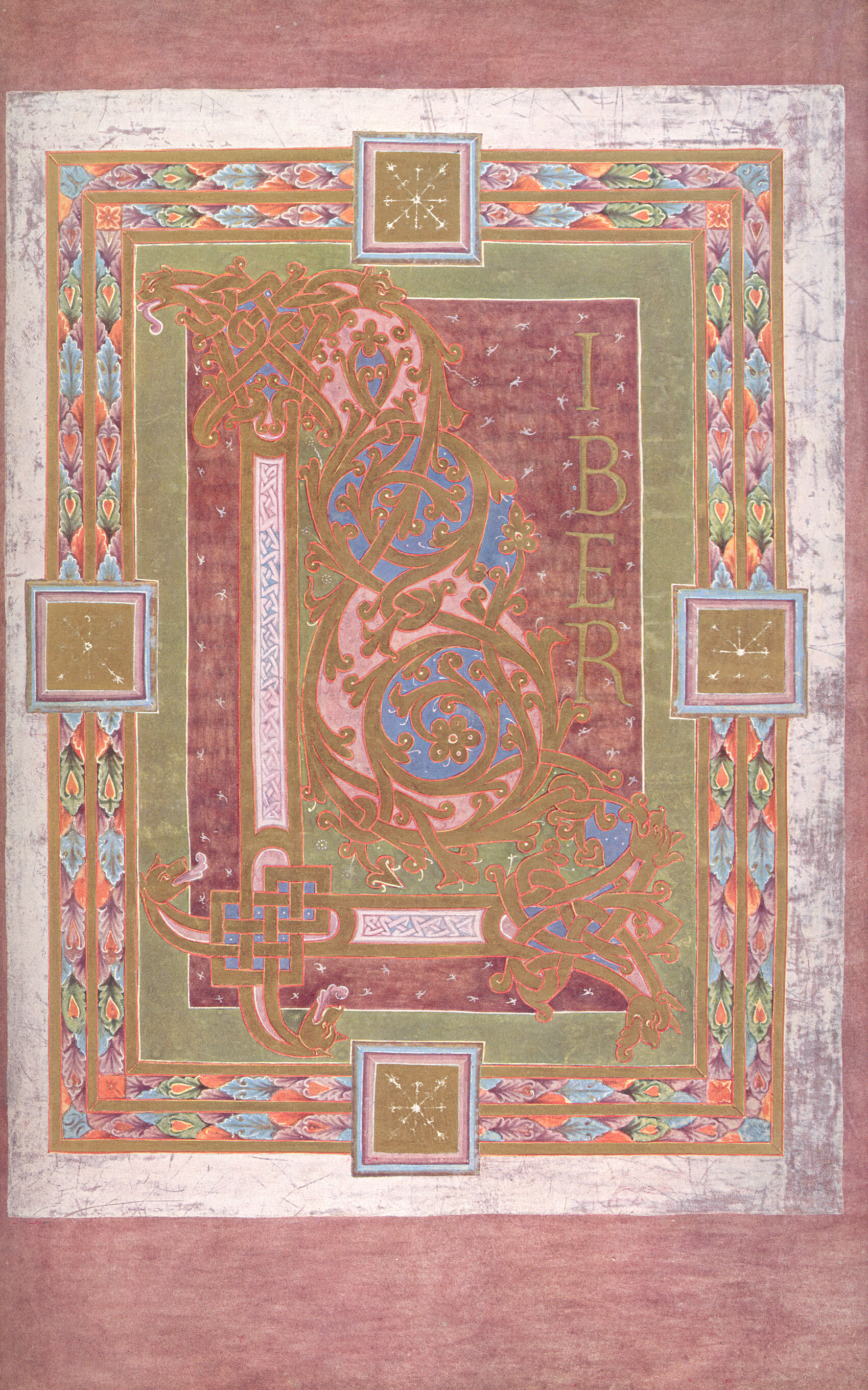
Initial page "Liber", the first word of the Vulgate text

== Cover ==
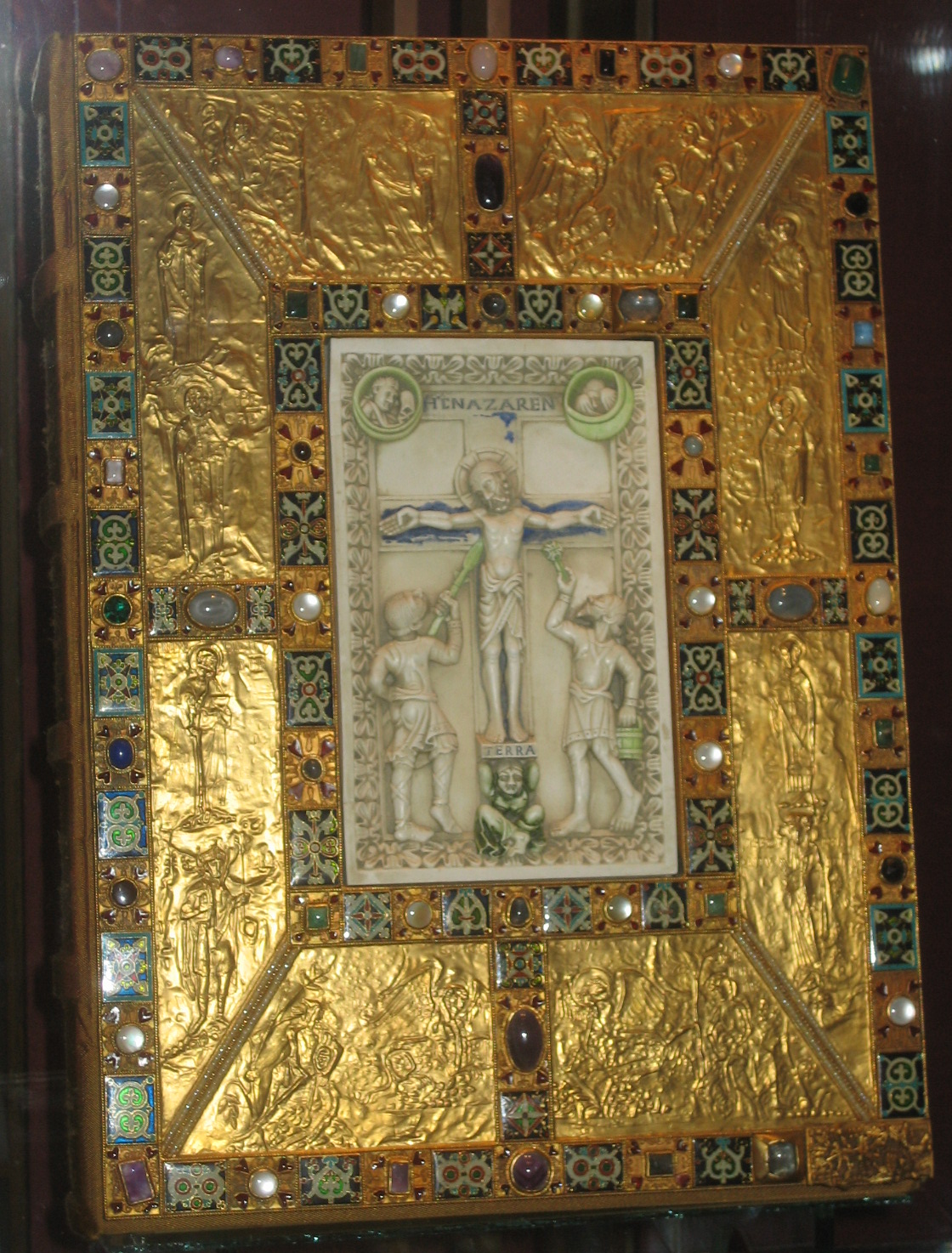
The front cover

The front cover of the manuscript is an Ottonian treasure binding which dates from about 50 years before the manuscript; the metalwork is attributed to the Trier workshop set up by Egbert, Archbishop of Trier. It centres on an ivory plaque showing the Crucifixion of Jesus, which is stylistically different from the other elements, and whose origin has been the subject of much discussion. The plaque has traces of blue paint on the cross and green paint highlighting some parts of the composition.

Surrounding the ivory plaque are panels, now rather battered, with figures in repoussé gold relief, and in a very different style than the plaque. These panels are set in a framework whose larger elements are made up of alternating units of gold filigree set with gems, and cloisonné enamel with stylized plant decorative motifs. Thinner gold bands set with small pearls run along the diagonal axes, further separating the relief images into compartments, and creating an "X" that may stand for "Christ"; an "X" in ash was traced on the floor of a new church in the ritual of its consecration. The general arrangement of the cover may be compared to others of the period – for example, that of the Codex Aureus of St. Emmeram of about 870, which probably forms part of the same tradition descending from the school of Reims in Carolingian art, as shown by the style of the relief figures.

As in other treasure bindings, the gems do not merely create an impression of richness. They offer a foretaste of the bejeweled nature of the Celestial city, and particular types of gem were believed to have actual powerful properties in various "scientific", medical, and magical respects, as set out in the popular lapidary books. Many of the original gems and pearls are now lost, but there are replacements in paste or mother of pearl.

The reliefs show the Four Evangelists with their symbols and background foliage in the compartments at top and bottom, and two figures each in four compartments on the sides. The lowest figures on each side are (left) the young Emperor Otto III with (right) his regent and mother Theophanu (d. 991). At the top of the sides stand the Virgin Mary (left) opposite Saint Peter; these two were the patron saints of Echternach Abbey. The remaining four figures are saints: Echternach's founder Willibrord; Saints Boniface and Ludger, also early missionaries in Germany; and Benedict, founder of the monastery's order. The figures are produced in an elegant, elongated style which contrasts strongly with the forceful and slightly squat figures of the ivory.

It is sometimes thought that the cover was made for the Trier manuscript in Paris known as the Sainte-Chapelle Gospels, illustrated by the Gregory Master, whose style influenced some of the later miniatures in the text now bound with the cover. Despite all the figures shown on the cover having a connection with Echternach, some authors suggest that the original manuscript was not made for that monastery at all; and that Archbishop Egbert presented it to Otto III and Theophanu, perhaps as a peace offering after he initially supported Henry the Quarrelsome as successor to Otto II, rather than his young son Otto III, in 983–984. At a later point the imperial family would then have passed the manuscript on to Echternach. A highly plausible suggestion however has been made by Gunther Wolf, namely that the front cover was commissioned really for Echternach (to Archbishop Egbert, while meeting him at Christmas 988 in Cologne) by Empress Theophanu (and Otto III) out of religious gratitude for her recovering of the illness that struck her at the end of the summer of 988 at Lake Constance; her adoration for Saint Willibrord, as shown by former gifts to Echternach, in that case was an additional motive in the perspective of the 250th anniversary of his death (November 7, 739 AD).

== History ==
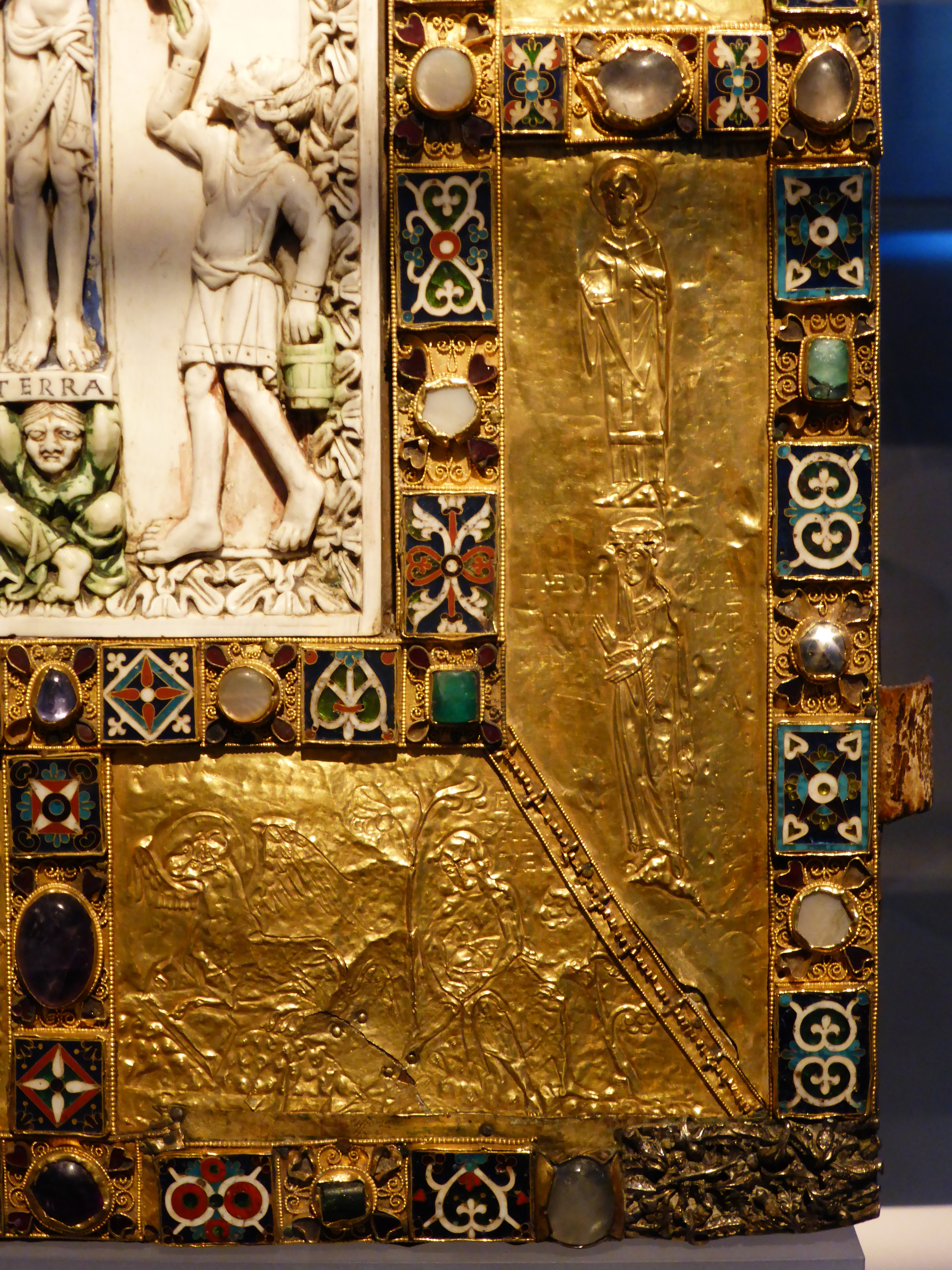
Detail of the cover, with Theophanu in the lower right

It is thought that this is the manuscript shown to Henry III, Holy Roman Emperor when he visited Echternach with his mother Gisela of Swabia (d. 1043), which so impressed him that he commissioned similar works from the abbey, notably the Golden Gospels of Henry III, which he presented in 1046 to Speyer Cathedral, the burial-place of his dynasty.

The manuscript was at the Abbey of Echternach in today's Luxembourg until the French Revolutionary Wars. During the War of the First Coalition, Luxembourg was conquered and annexed by Revolutionary France, becoming part of the département of the Forêts in 1795. The monastery was seized and sold, and most of the monks fled, carrying the manuscript and other portable treasures with them. It was one of a group of three manuscripts and five incunabula sold to Ernest II, Duke of Saxe-Gotha-Altenburg in 1801.

It remained in the collection of the House of Saxe-Coburg and Gotha, which was turned over to a foundation after World War I, until after World War II. It was decided to sell it but the then duke was keen to keep it in Germany, and the German Federal government and the provinces or Länder contributed the funds jointly, with Bavaria in the lead, as its new home was to be the Germanisches Nationalmuseum in Nuremberg, where it remains.
