= Registrum Gregorii =

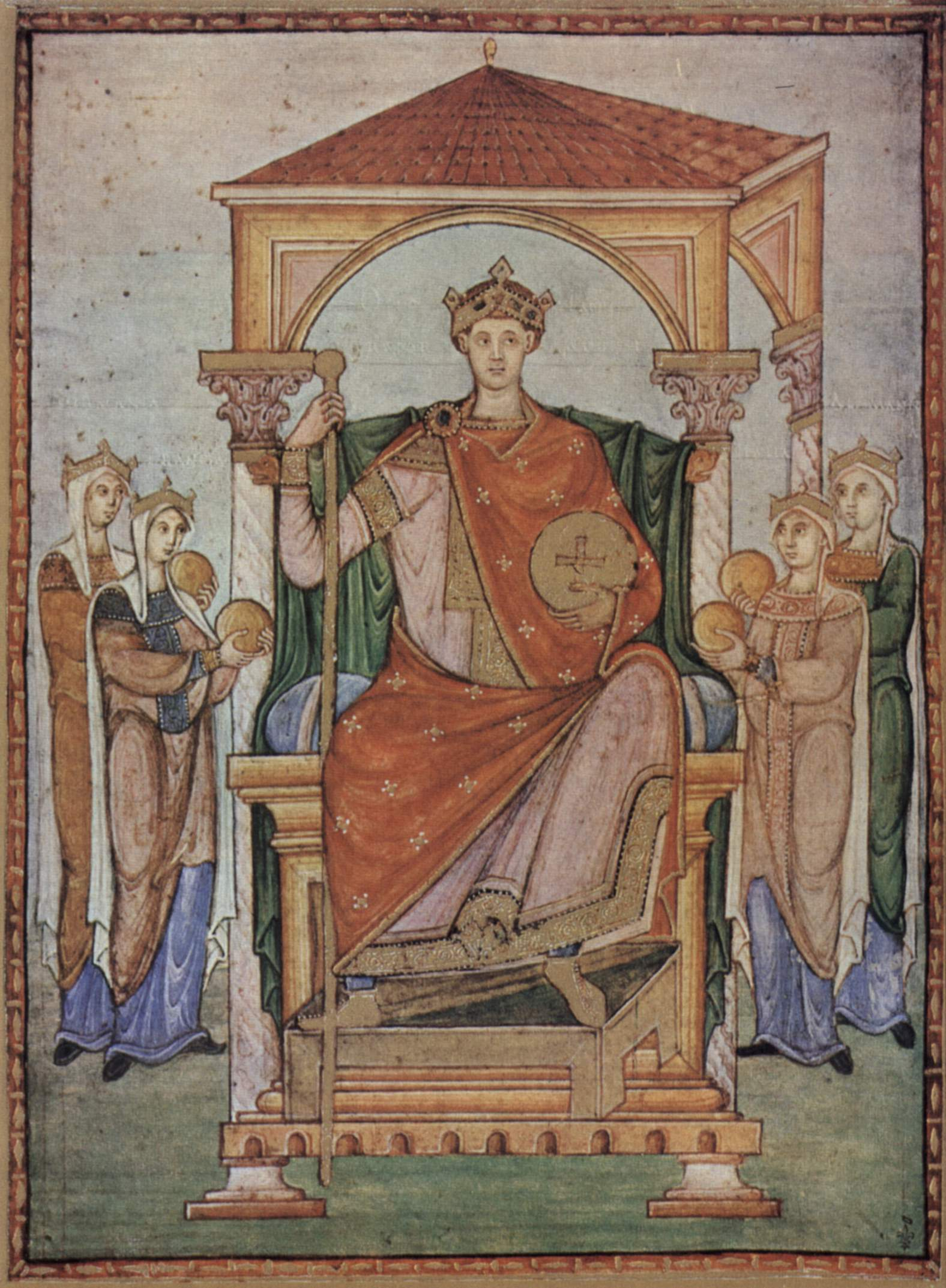
Otto II (Chantilly, Musée Condé, Ms. 14 bis)

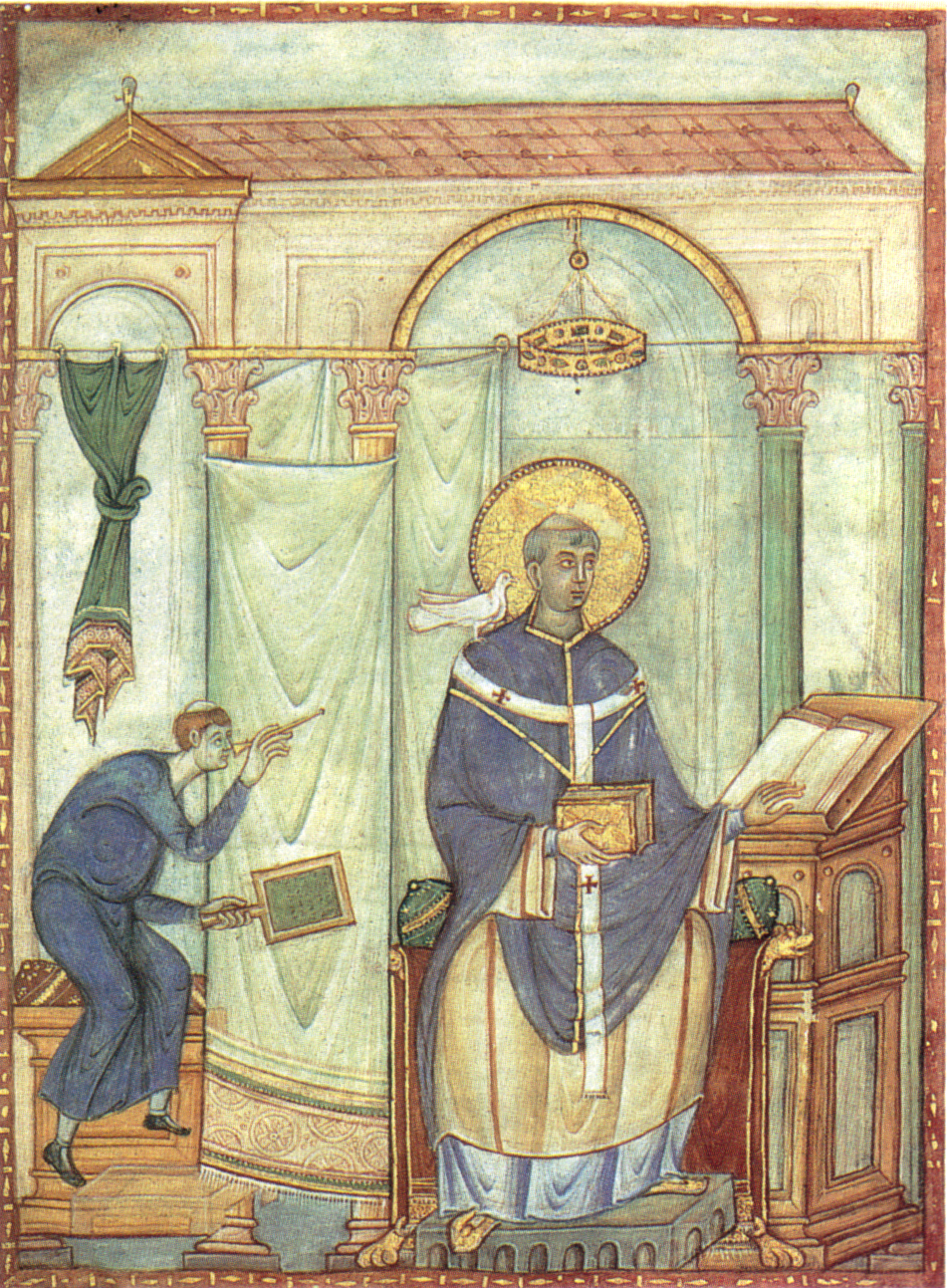
Pope Gregory the Great (Trier, Stadtbibliothek, 171/1626a)

The Registrum Gregorii is a copy of the collection of letters by pope Gregory the Great. It was commissioned by Egbert of Trier from the anonymous Italian artist known as the "master of the Registrum Gregorii" or the "Gregory Master" (fl. c. 980–996), probably after the death of Otto II, Holy Roman Emperor in 983.

== Illuminated miniatures ==
The manuscript was separated: Two pages show one illuminated miniature each - one shows Otto II enthroned and surrounded by the four provinces of his empire (now held at the Musée Condé in Chantilly, France), and the other shows pope Gregory the Great writing whilst receiving inspiration from the Holy Spirit in the form of a dove, which is perched on his shoulder (now held at the Stadtbibliothek at Trier).

== Frontispiece and its inspiration ==
The frontispiece of the Registrum Gregorii, depicting Pope Gregory the Great writing, was inspired by a story of how he was given dictation by the Holy Spirit. The story goes that while Pope Gregory was writing his sermon on Ezekiel, a curtain was drawn between him and his secretary, Deacon Peter. From the other side of the curtain, Pope Gregory started to have long pauses in his speech, and Deacon Peter became nervous, so he poked a hole in the curtain to see what was happening. What the Deacon saw was a dove perched on Pope Gregory’s shoulder with its beak in the Pope's mouth. When the dove took its beak out of the Pope’s mouth, he would begin to speak again, and Peter would continue to write down his words. The bird was supposedly the Holy Ghost in the form of a dove, and when it put its beak into the mouth of St. Gregory, it was putting its own words into Gregory’s mouth. It is from this legend that the dove became the hallmark of St. Peter, and has been since the ninth century.

== Personal style of the artist ==
The Gregory Master was able to show personal expression even with the hieratic forms of Ottonian art, and did so through the characters' idealized faces, the way the clothing forms around their bodies, and through his use of colors and concentrated drawing. The illustration itself provides a visual to the legend of Pope Gregory, it shows Deacon Peter peering through a curtain hanging from two pillars, and the dove inspiring Gregory’s sermon. Peter is on the left, with a tonsure haircut, wearing a blue robe, and jumping in the air from excitement. Peter is also holding his stylus in one hand, which he used to poke a hole in the curtain, and a tablet in the other. Gregory is on the right, wearing a blue robe on top of other garments, and is sitting on a cushioned seat in front of a lectern. In one hand Peter is holding a book, his other hand is resting on the lectern, and the Holy Spirit in the form of a dove is perched on his shoulder. Peter also has a gold halo around his head that encompasses the bird’s head as well. There is a chandelier hanging over Peter’s head that is reminiscent of a crown, and the way his feet are angled illustrates reverse perspective. The illustration also uses hierarchical tactics by making Gregory larger than Peter, but Peter is so big that it makes the ceiling look low, and the room shallow.

== Breakup of the manuscript ==
The main part of the manuscript is also held at the Stadtbibliothek at Trier (Trier, Stadtbibliothek, 171/1626). It is a large fragment (37 folios of an estimated 256 folios originally). Unlike the two leaves with full-page illuminations, the main part of the manuscript has no major decoration. The manuscript was bound in the 18th century and bought by the Trier library in 1814.
