= Codex Egberti =

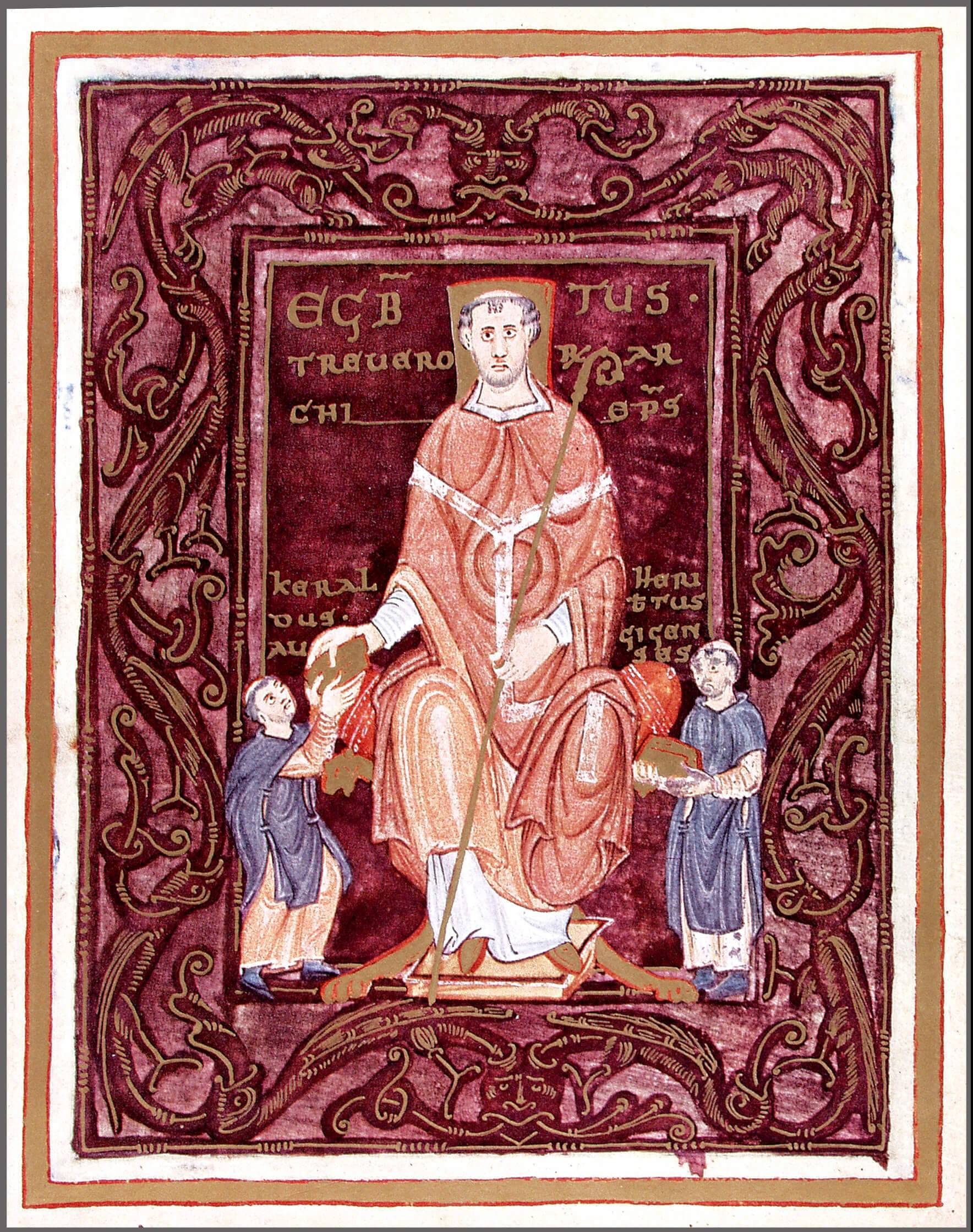
Dedicatory miniature showing Egbert himself

The Codex Egberti is a gospel book illuminated in the scriptorium of the Reichenau Monastery for Egbert, bishop of Trier (980–993). It is now held in the city library of Trier (Cod.24).

== Miniatures ==
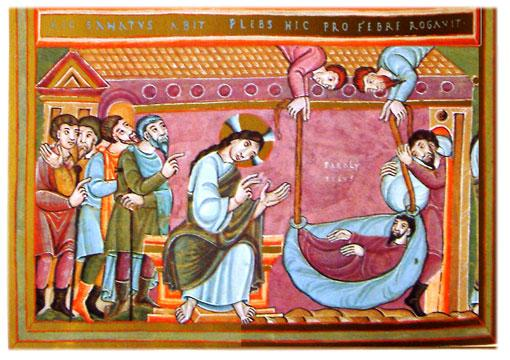
Healing of the Paralytic

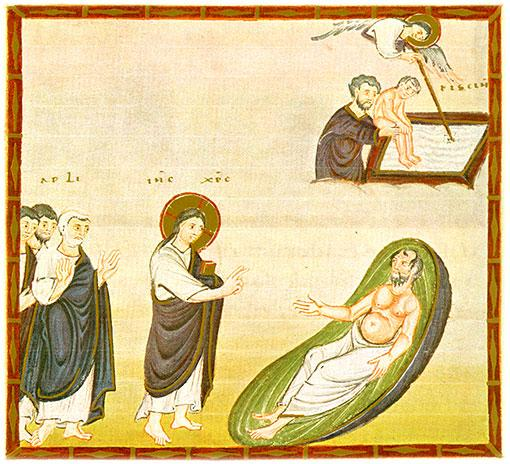
Healing at Bethesda

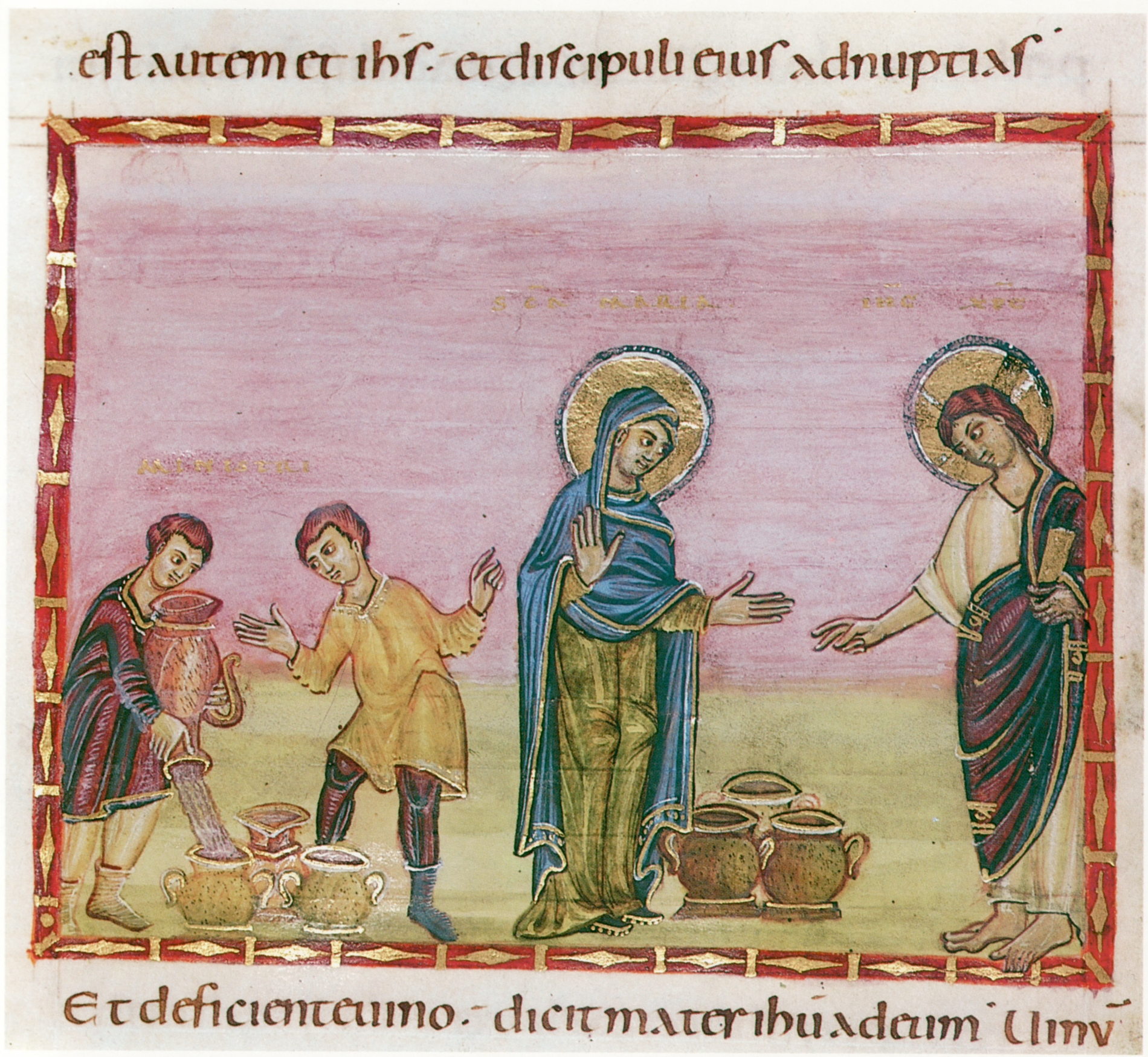
The Miracle at Cana

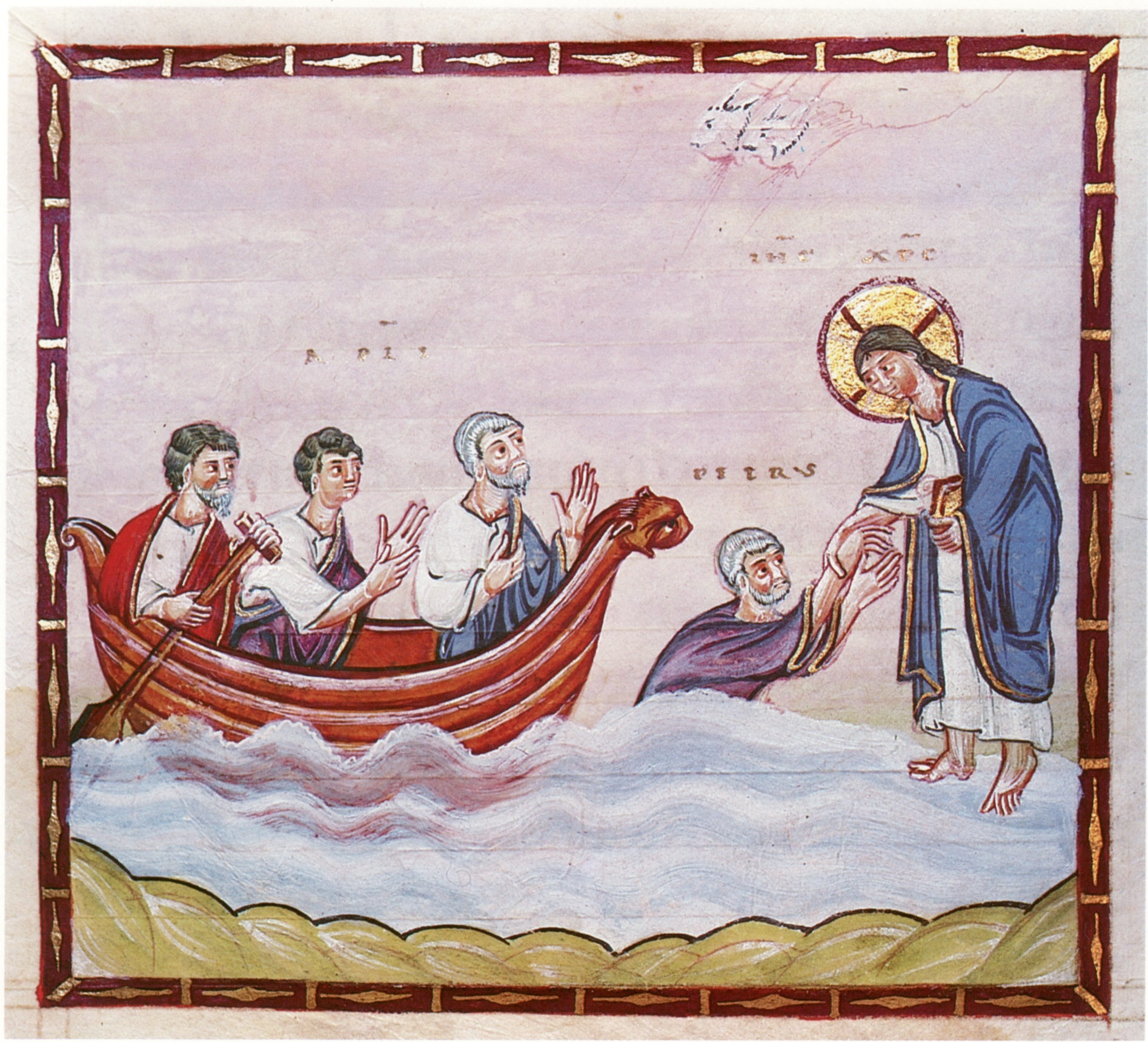
Jesus walking on water

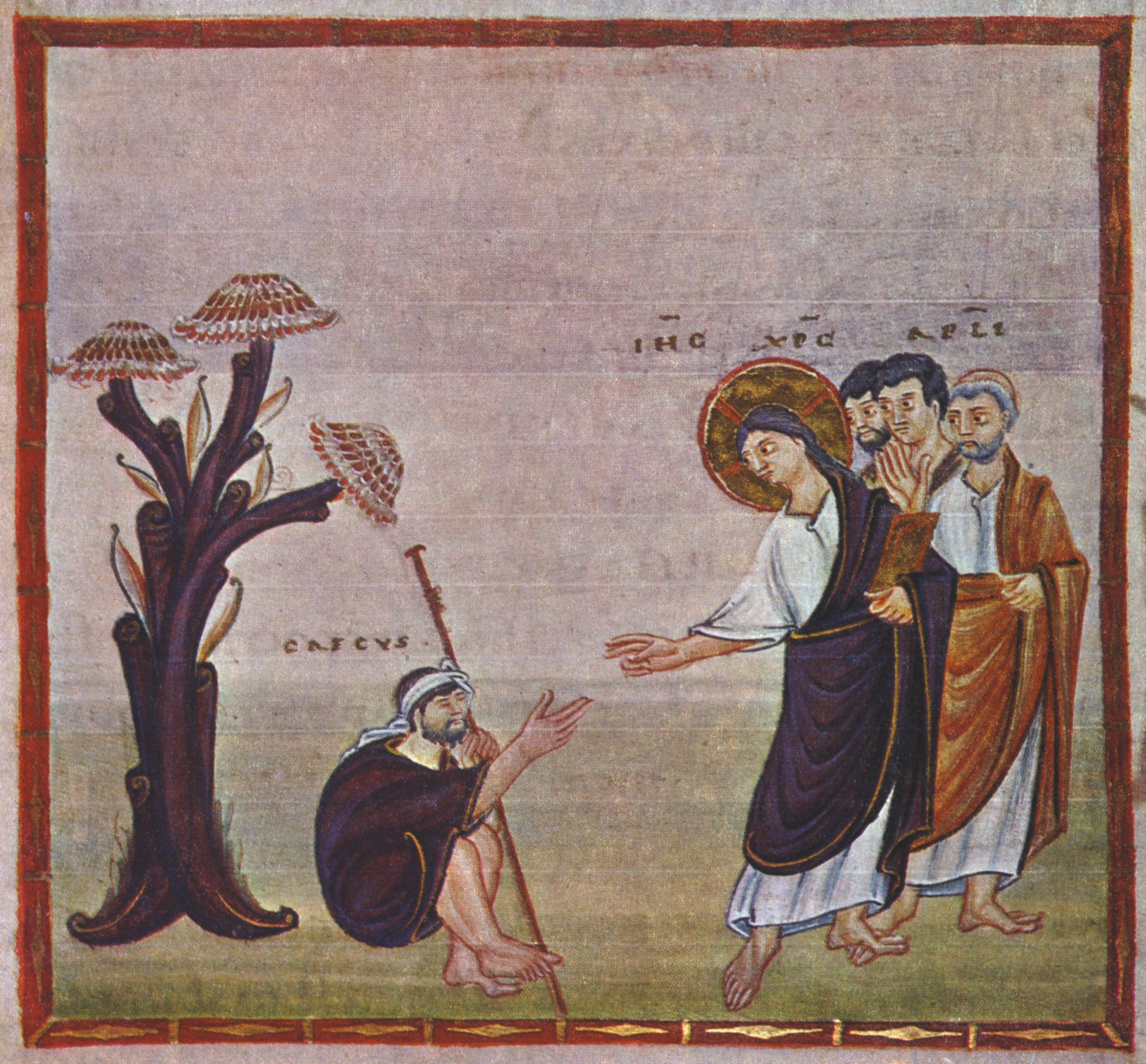
Healing the Blind Man of Jericho

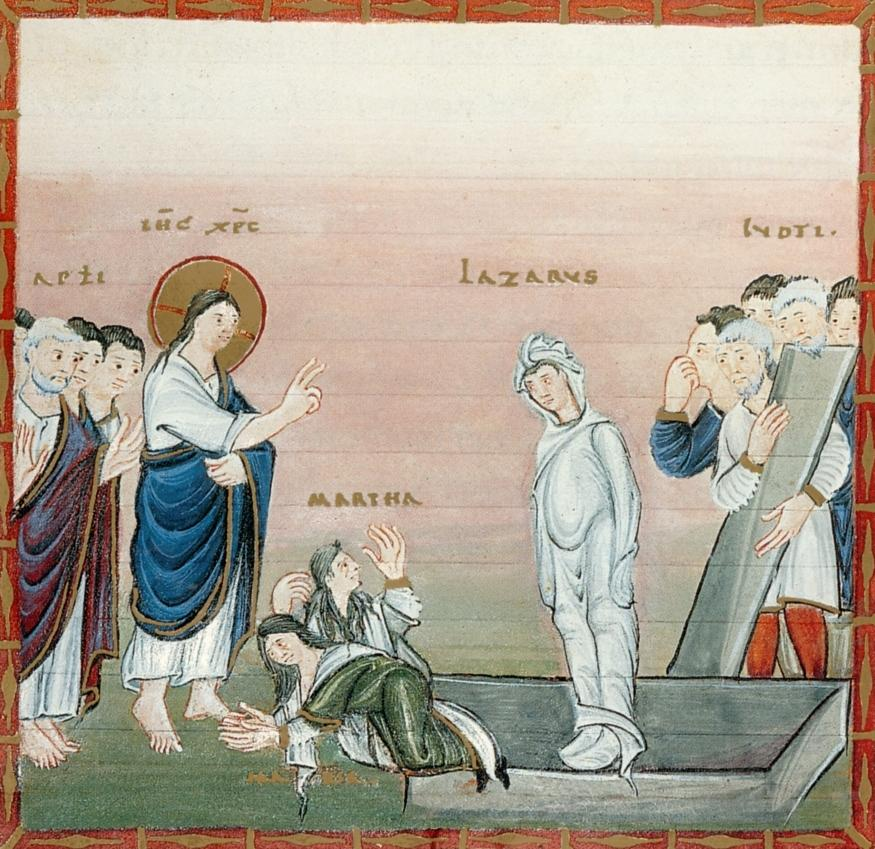
The Resurrection of Lazarus

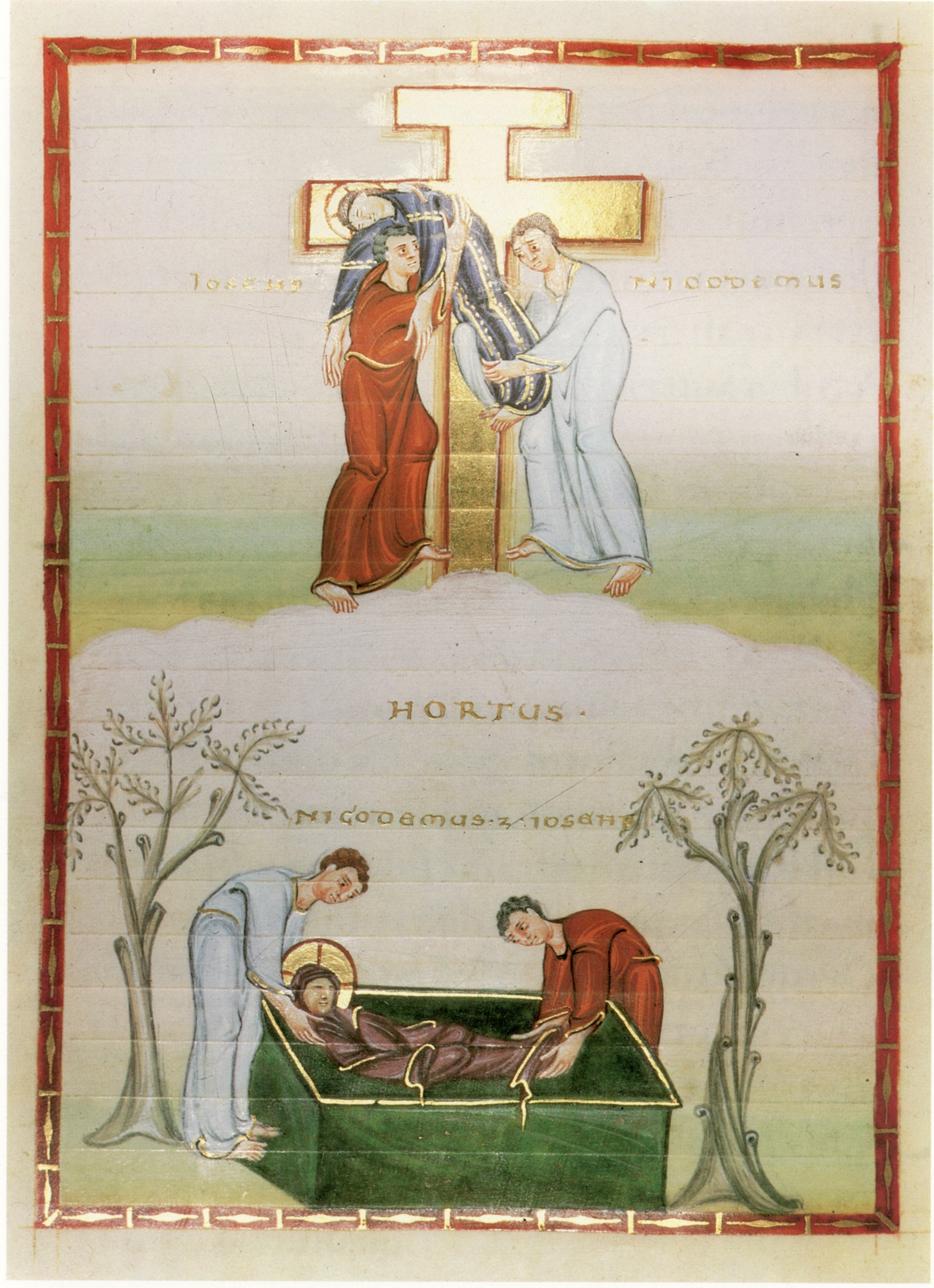
The Deposition and Entombment

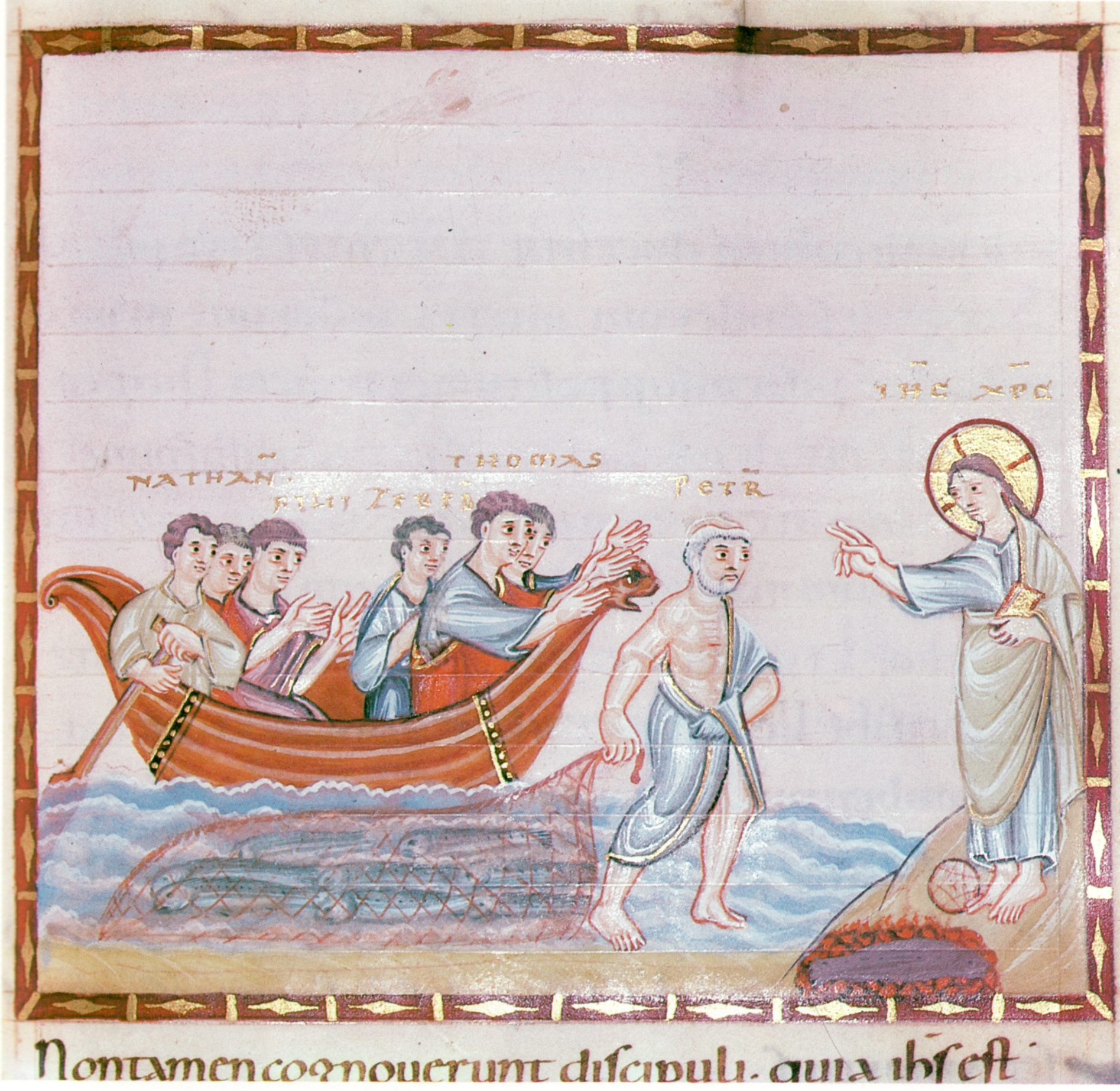
The Miraculous Catch of Fish

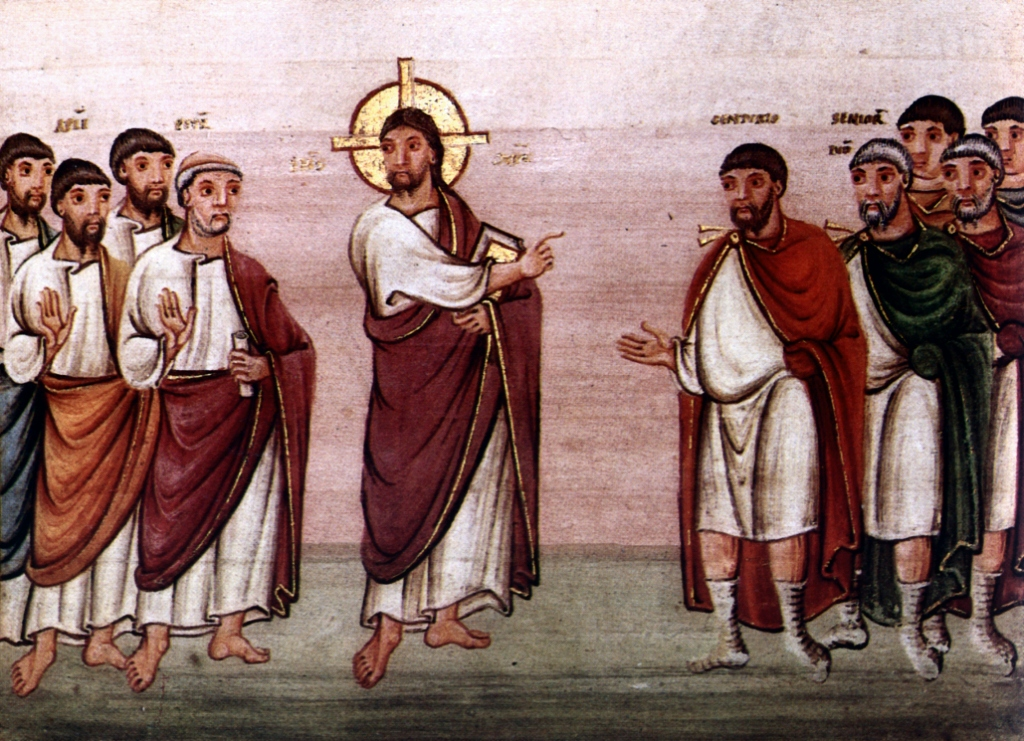
The centurion at Capernaum

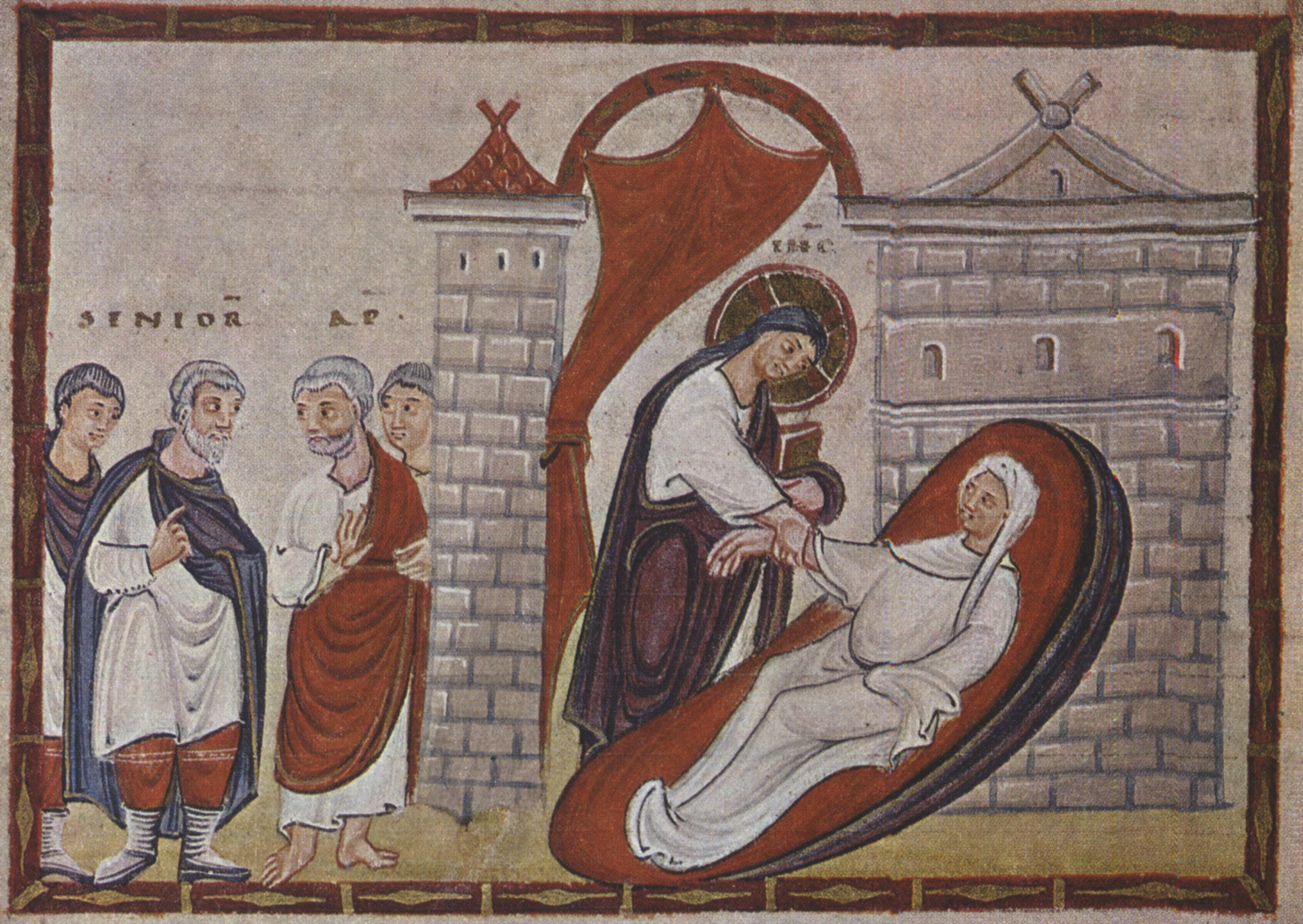
Resurrection of Jairus's Daughter

== Bibliography ==
- (in German) Codex Egberti – Stadtbibliothek Trier, Ms. 24, Luzern Faksimile Verlag, 2005, 330 p.
- (in German) Gunther Franz, « Ein Höhepunkt der Buchmalerei vor tausend Jahren Die Geschichte des Egbert-Codex in Trier », Trierer theologische Zeitschrift, Trier, Paulinus-Druckerei, vol. 118, no 4, 2009, p. 277-286
