= Egbert (archbishop of Trier) =

Archbishop of Trier

- Archbishop of Trier
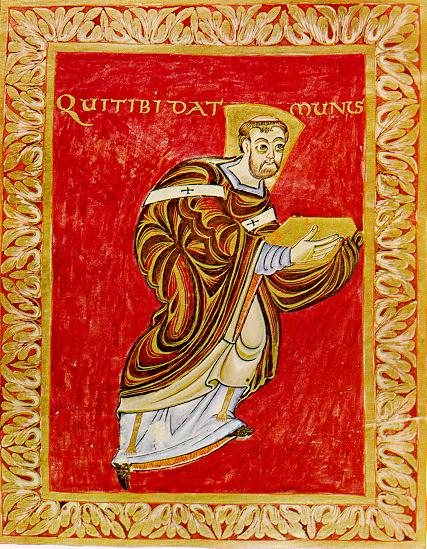
- Egbert, from his psalter. In this presentation miniature he presents the book to Saint Peter (in a facing portrait) in a characteristic statement of the indirect Petrine authority of the See of Trier.
- Church: Catholic Church
- Diocese: Electorate of Trier
- In office: 977–993

Personal details
- Born: c. 950
- Died: 9 December 993

Egbert (c. 950 – 9 December 993) was the Archbishop of Trier from 977 until his death.

Egbert was a son of Dirk II, Count of Holland. After being trained in Egmond Abbey, founded and controlled by his family, and at the court of Bruno I, Archbishop of Cologne, he became the chancellor of Otto II in 976. The following year he was appointed to the archdiocese of Trier, still probably in his twenties. He accompanied Otto II on visits to Italy in 980 and 983, and may have made other trips there. After Otto II's death in 983, he joined the party supporting the succession of Henry the Quarrelsome, Duke of Bavaria, rather than Otto III, but returned to supporting Otto in 985.

Egbert was a significant patron of science and the arts, who established one or more workshops of goldsmiths and enamellers at Trier, which produced works for other Ottonian centres and the Imperial court. Beginning with his tenure, Trier came to rival Mainz and Cologne as the artistic centre of the Ottonian world. These were the three most important episcopal sees in Germany, who at this period disputed the primacy of the emerging German (East Frankish) kingdom between them.

== Efforts to secure the primacy of Germany ==
To be established as the Primate of Germany would bring important political advantages, and increasing the prestige of his see through cultural means was probably an important element in Egbert's presumed role in establishing or encouraging artists and craftsmen to settle there. When Otto II was crowned in Aachen in 961, all three archbishops had performed the ceremony together.

In the traditional account, the battle for the primacy was in fact effectively lost in 975, two years before Egbert acceded to Trier, when Willigis, the new Archbishop of Mainz, Egbert's predecessor as chancellor, where Egbert worked under him, obtained privileges from Pope Benedict VII that amounted to a primacy which later developments would confirm and formalize. There were also earlier privileges from 969 and 973. But as archbishop Egbert seems to have still been fighting a rearguard action, building on developments by his predecessor of the story of the origins of the see, in which a staff given by Saint Peter to Eucharius, the supposed first bishop, played a large role. Trier was also the old Roman northern capital, still with abundant Roman ruins. However the authenticity of the Mainz privileges has recently been questioned, with some scholars now arguing that they were forgeries produced not long after Egbert's lifetime, so the question may have been more open. The appearance, not recorded before Egbert's episcopy, of an actual staff alleged to be that Saint Peter gave to Eucharius, certainly deserves to be treated with great suspicion as a "brazen" fabrication. Though apparently smoothed over, Egbert's initial support for Henry the Quarrelsome as successor to Otto II (who Willigis of Mainz had supported throughout) may have put paid to any chances he had of succeeding in his ambitions for primacy.

== Patron of the arts ==
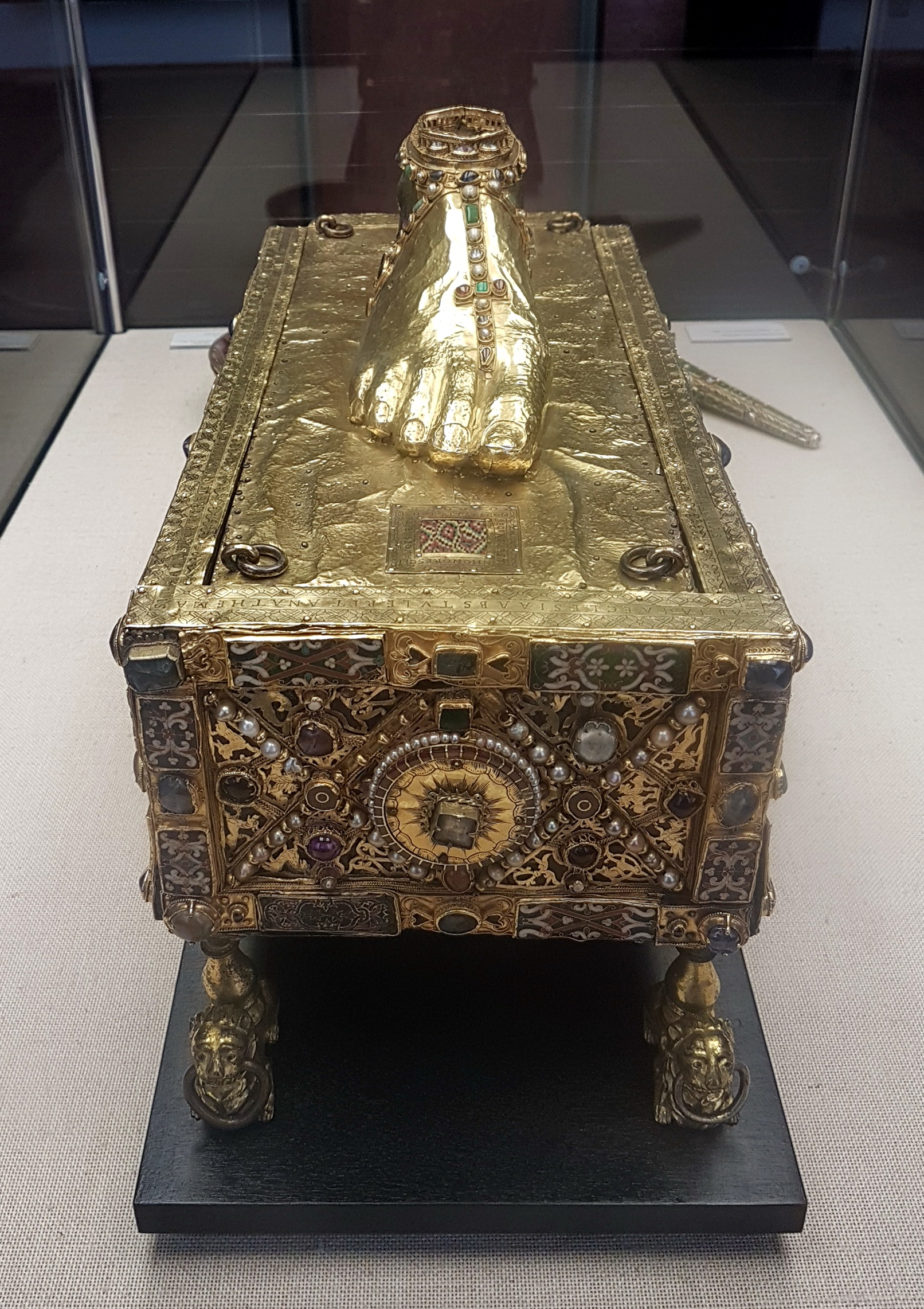
So-called "Egbert shrine" in the Treasury of Trier Cathedral

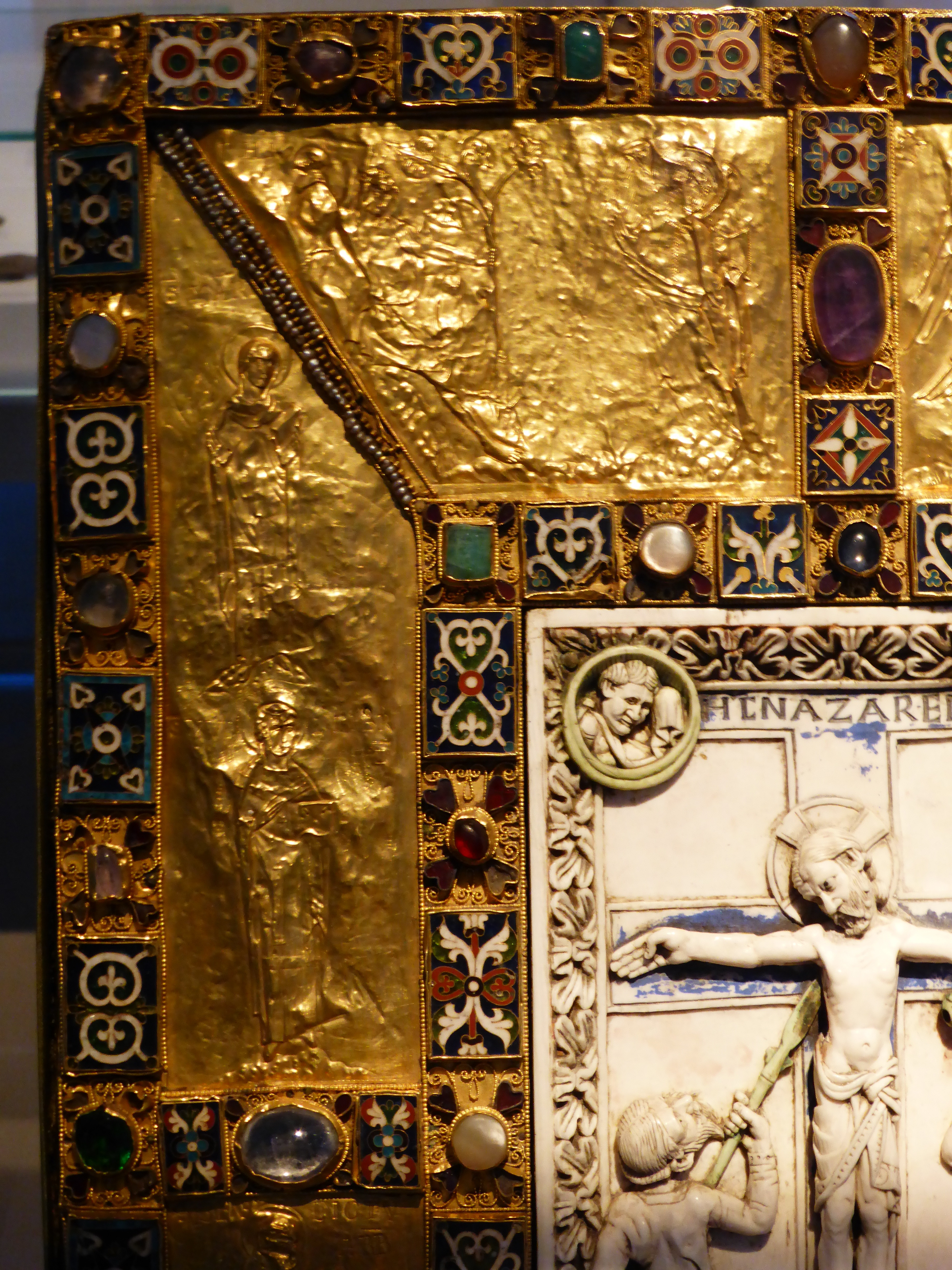
Detail of the Trier enamels and gold reliefs on the treasure binding for the Codex Aureus of Echternach

Egbert was one of the most important Ottonian clerical patrons, and though he also built churches and monasteries, and no doubt commissioned wall-paintings and works in other media, the surviving pieces are in the form of metalwork with enamel and illuminated manuscripts. The manuscripts were both inscribed and illuminated by monks with specialized skills, some of whose names are preserved, but there is no evidence as to the artists who worked in metal, enamel and ivory, who are usually assumed to have been laymen, though there were some monastic goldsmiths in the Early Medieval period, and some lay brothers and lay assistants employed by monasteries. While secular jewellery supplied a steady stream of work for goldsmiths, ivory carving at this period was mainly for the church, and may have been centred in monasteries.

=== Metalwork ===
The workshop Egbert is presumed to have established at Trier is the only Ottonian workshop producing enamels that can be clearly located. There are three main survivals of metalwork pieces certainly commissioned by Egbert, though contemporary literary references make it clear there was originally a large production, and both the three clear survivals and a larger group of objects often related to Trier both show "astonishingly little unity" in style and workmanship, which makes the confident attribution of other pieces such as the Cross of Otto and Mathilde very difficult. The three clear survivals are the so-called "Egbert shrine", a reliquary casket and portable altar for a sandal of Saint Andrew and other relics, still in the Treasury of Trier Cathedral, the staff-reliquary of St Peter, now in Limburg Cathedral Treasury, and the metalwork on the treasure binding reused for the Codex Aureus of Echternach some fifty years later, having been donated by Empress Theophanu. This last had possibly been given to Theophanu and Otto III to mark Egbert's reconciliation with them in 985. Of these three pieces clearly attributable to Trier, Peter Lasko wrote: "Each seems to have been made in a totally different workshop, using different sources, techniques, and principles of composition, and if the evidence for Archbishop Egbert as the donor for all three pieces were not so overwhelming, no one would have dared to attribute them all to one centre." Elements such as enamel plaques were probably produced at Trier for patrons in other centres, as some surviving correspondence as well actual pieces suggest. It has been suggested that, as there is little evidence of the Trier workshop after Egbert's death, Mathilde, Abbess of Essen recruited it for Essen.

The staff-reliquary now in Limburg uses iconography to promote the claims of the see of Trier, with sets of enamel plaques with portraits of the Apostles paired with those of the earliest bishops of Trier, and other sets matching popes with later bishops. There is evidence that "Egbert put the reliquary to frequent use" to relieve droughts and the like, and very likely to also to "brandish" it to increase his authority in synods and other important meetings.

=== Manuscripts ===
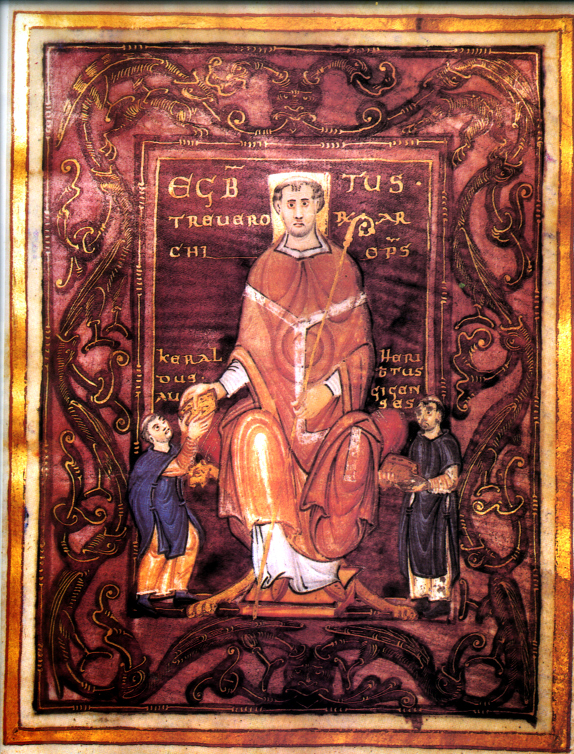
The presentation miniature of the Codex Egberti, with Egbert's portrait

Egbert's major commissions of manuscripts seem to date from about 980 onwards, and it is unclear where they were produced; monastic scribes and illuminators may have been rather mobile between the major centres. Egbert commissioned the compilation of the Registrum Gregorii from the letters of Pope Gregory the Great, and produced a magnificently illuminated copy. The finest painter of this manuscript worked on a number of other books, probably at Trier and later Reichenau, and is known as the Gregory Master, whose work looked back in some respects to Late Antique manuscript painting, and whose miniatures are notable for "their delicate sensibility to tonal grades and harmonies, their fine sense of compositional rhythms, their feelings for the relationship of figures in space, and above all their special touch of reticence and poise". Egbert was also the recipient of the illuminated manuscript Codex Egberti, showing an early form of Romanesque style, which was probably produced at the up-and-coming centre of Reichenau, though the manuscripts associated with Egbert and with Reichenau at this period show something of the same confusing diversity of style as the metalwork.

The Egbert Psalter, which he commissioned for his own use in Trier Cathedral, was used a number of times after his death as a diplomatic gift, travelling as far as Russia and Hungary, and has been in Cividale del Friuli in northern Italy since 1229. A number of other manuscripts survive. The miniatures in Egbert's manuscripts repeat many of the themes promoting the claims of the see of Trier that are found in the metalwork; in the psalter miniatures show the scribe (named as Ruodpreht) presenting the book to Egbert, who in turn presents it to Saint Peter. The square halos (for a living person) given to Egbert in both the portraits illustrated here are one of the elements showing Italian influence on Trier miniatures. A well-known miniature in the Registrum Gregorii of Gregory writing probably represents Egbert also, and the pairing of portraits of popes and bishops of Trier found on the Limburg staff also appears.
